= Bishop Wulstan School =

Coordinates: 52.3668°N 1.2617°W

- Rugby, Warwickshire; England

Bishop Wulstan School was a Catholic high school situated on Oak Street in the town of Rugby, Warwickshire, England.

== History ==
The school was best known for its history as it was once a practising monastery or Novitiate, associated with St.Marie's Church on Dunchurch Road. There is some debate as to the architect of the school. Many believe it was designed by Pugin who designed the St.Marie's church next door, although alternatives such as George Myers and C.F. Hanson have been suggested.

The school is named after Saint Wulfstan or Wulstan. He was the Bishop of Worcester between 1062 and his death in 1095. Following the Norman Conquest in 1066, he was the only bishop to retain his post under William the Conqueror.

The school was mainly closed in August 2007. However the final year group stayed until July 2008 under the care of Ashlawn School.

The premises were bought by Rugby School, refurbished and reopened in September 2013 as 'The Collingwood Centre'.
