= Golden logistics triangle =

Area of the English Midlands

Places included in various definitions of the golden triangle. Red is original location, blue is Office for National Statistics locations, green is locations from other sources

The golden logistics triangle is an area of the English Midlands containing a high number of logistics and warehousing facilities. It originally referred to a small area around Lutterworth, Leicestershire, but various definitions have set areas across the East and West Midlands, as far north as Yorkshire and as far south as Milton Keynes. The Office for National Statistics uses a definition of any area within 4 hours driving distance of 90% of the British population, which gives a non-contiguous area in the West Midlands.

== Description ==
The term originated as a description for a small area around Magna Park in Lutterworth, Leicestershire, and referred to the good connectivity to local motorways enjoyed by logistics businesses located there. It has since expanded to a hazily defined portion of the English Midlands, where logistics industries have increasingly been located in the 21st century. Torsten Bell, writing for The Guardian in 2022, regards it as stretching between Birmingham, Northamptonshire and Yorkshire. Berlin School of Economics and Law professor Richard Vahrenkamp regards it as comprising a stretch of the M1 Motorway between Milton Keynes and Nottingham. Cardiff University professors Yingli Wang and Stephen Pettit consider it to lie between Milton Keynes, Birmingham and Tamworth. A 2010 Department for Transport publication regards it as being between Rugby, Daventry and Northampton, centred on the West Coast Main Line, which carries half of all the UK rail freight.

== ONS definition and assessment of trends ==
The Office for National Statistics (ONS) has adopted the term and defines it as any 1 square kilometre (0.39 sq mi) of the country which lies within four hours' drive of 90% of the British population. This provides a non-contiguous area of 239 square miles (620 km^{2}) in the West Midlands, running broadly between Lichfield, Cannock, Wolverhampton, Solihull, Redditch and Nuneaton, with outlying patches at Bromsgrove and to the south of Coventry.

The ONS also noted that other parts of the country, outside its golden triangle, have seen recent growth in logistics operations, including the East of England and Yorkshire and the Humber regions, which were not previously focuses for the logistics industry. The ONS cited changes in shopping habits, the coronavirus pandemic and post-Brexit adjustments as potential causes of the industry's expansion. Wang and Pettit note that there is a considerable benefit for retail warehouses to be located close to the main parcel distribution hubs, which are traditionally sited in the Midlands. Being closer to a hub allows the retailer to set later ordering times on its website for next day delivery.

According to the ONS, in 2021, the UK had 88% more transport and storage business premises than in 2011 and 21% more than in 2019; the number of road transport freight businesses increased by 114% between 2011 and 2021 and the number of postal and courier businesses by 147%. They also note that it was the East Midlands, rather than the West Midlands, that accounted for the largest regional warehouse construction spending in 2021 (the West Midlands was the fourth-highest spending region behind Yorkshire and the Humber and the East of England). However, the West Midlands recorded the largest increase in heavy goods vehicle traffic between 2011 and 2019, at 15%. Ozlem Bak of Brunel University considers the golden logistics triangle a result of the deindustrialisation of the Midlands away from mining and heavy industry, which required replacement industries with logistics businesses being attracted to the area by incentives to create jobs.
