= Rugby, Warwickshire =

Town in Warwickshire, England

Coordinates: 52.37°N 1.26°W

Rugby
- Town
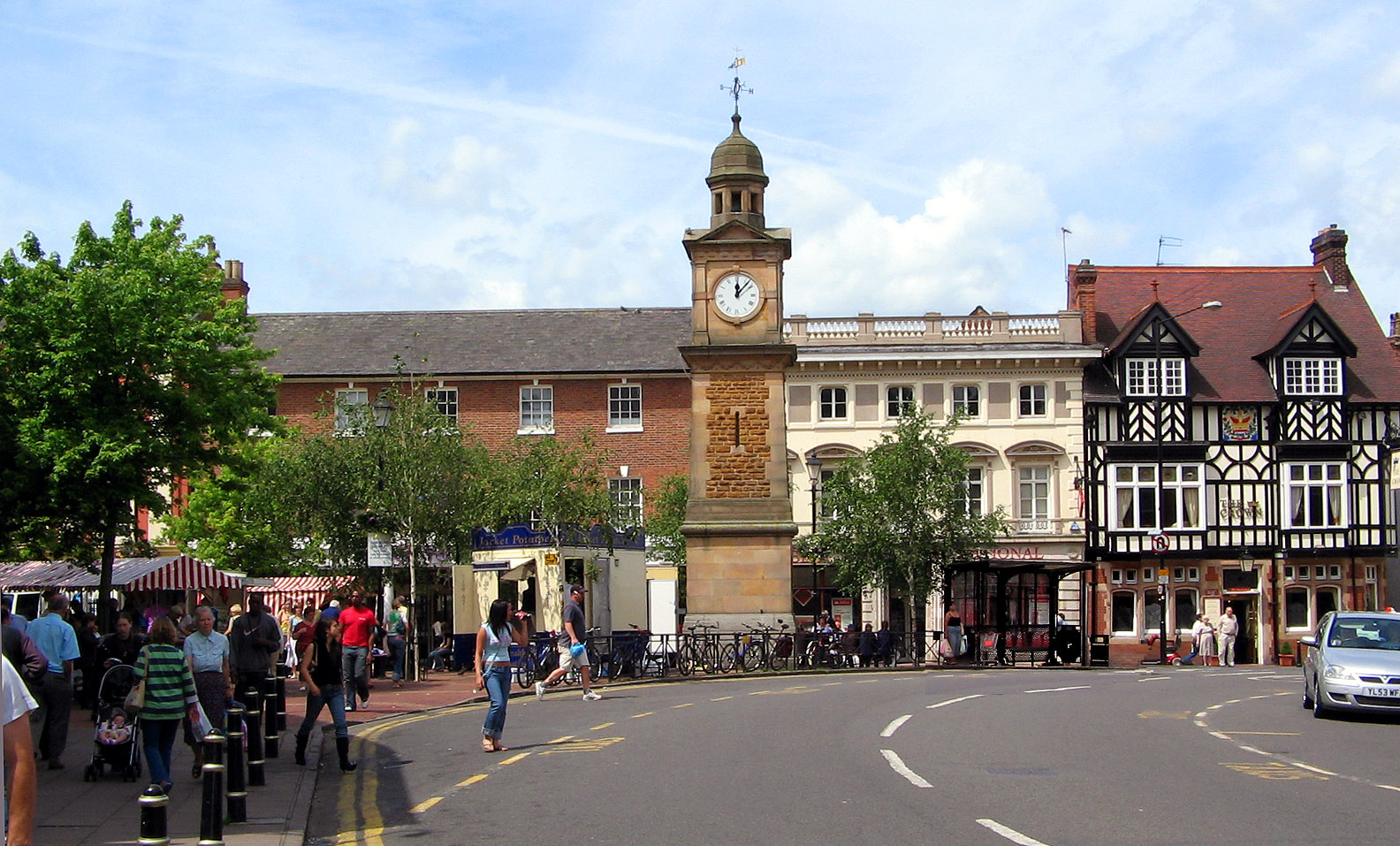
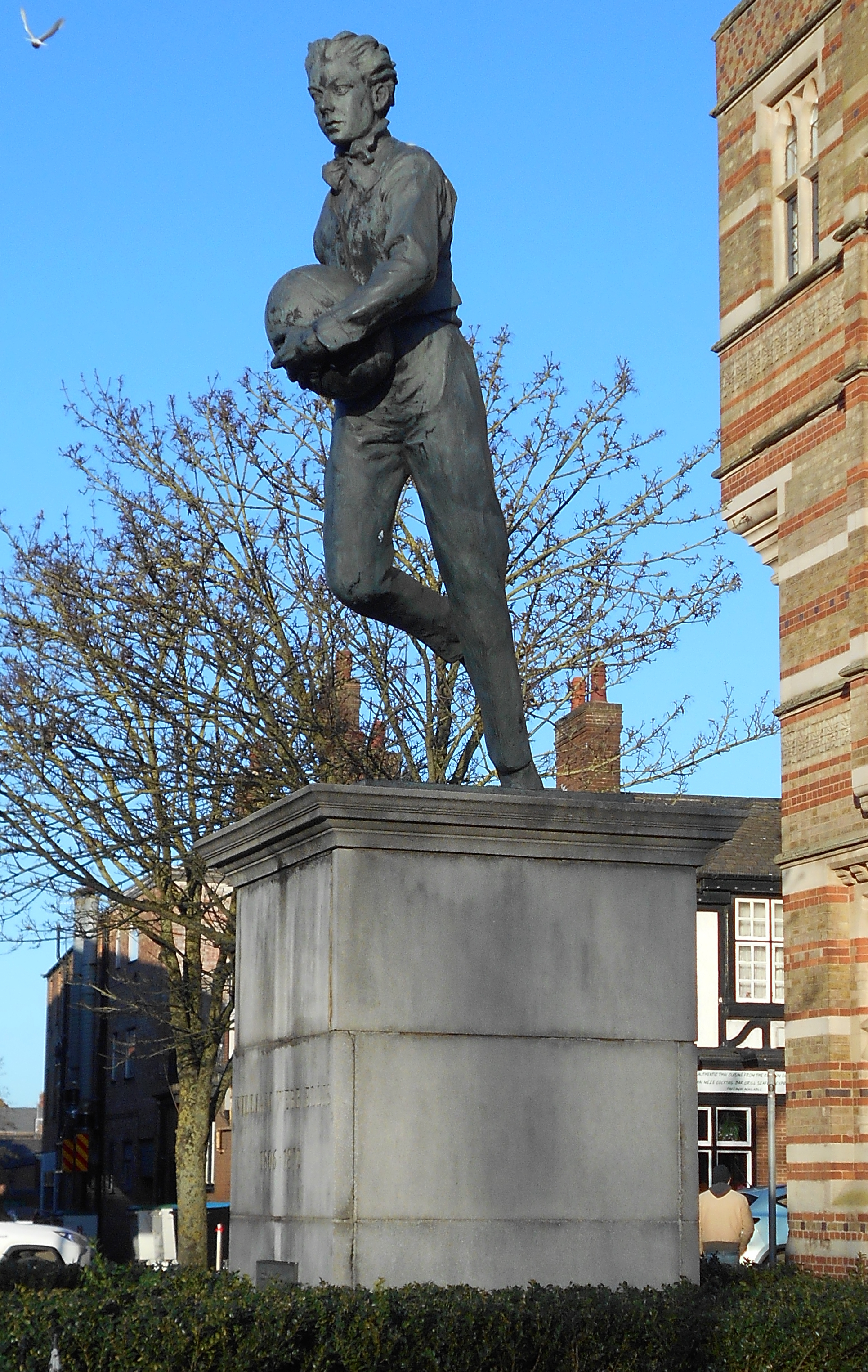
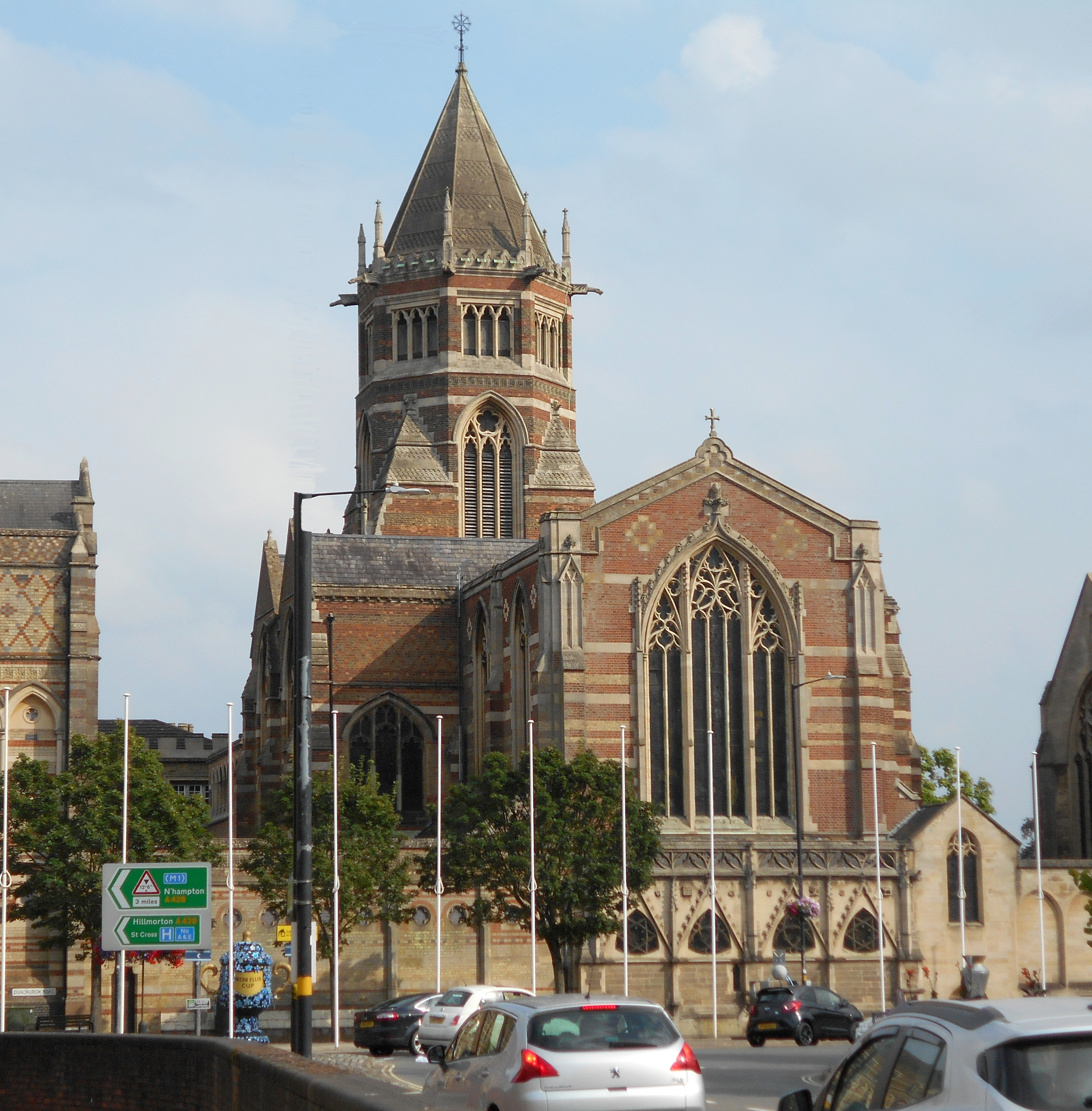
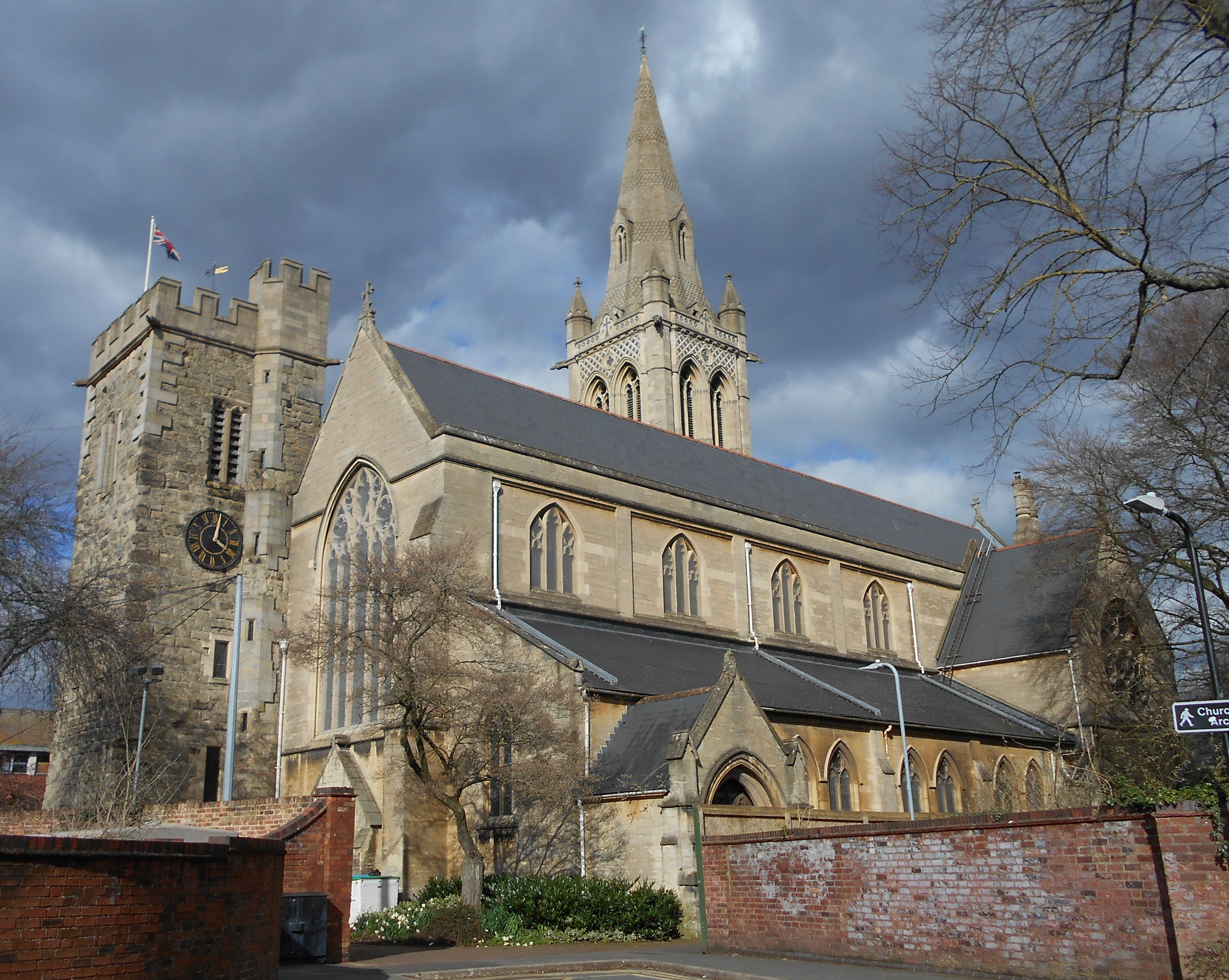
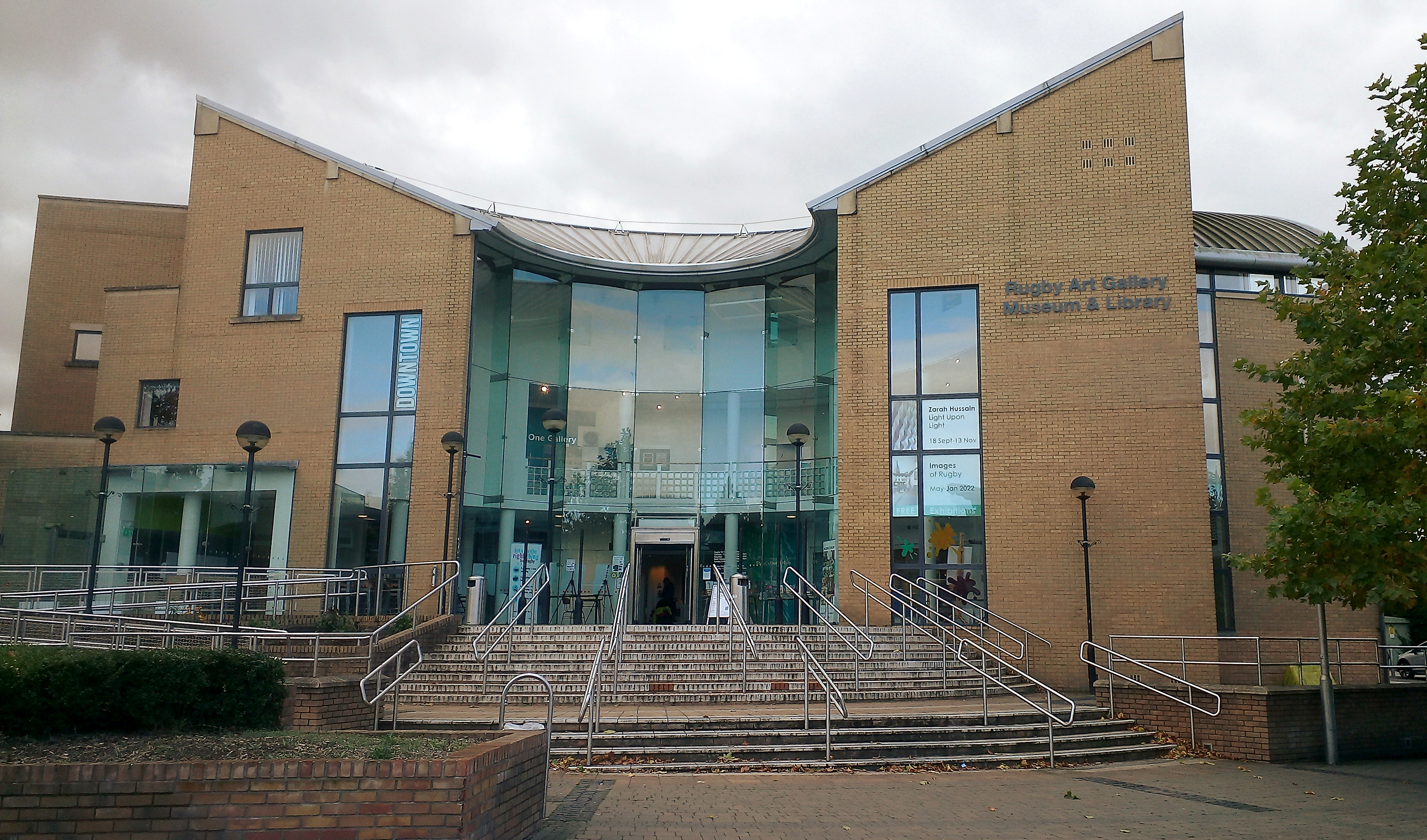
- Market Place and Clock Tower William Webb Ellis statue Rugby School Chapel St Andrew's Church Art Gallery, Museum & Library

- Location within Warwickshire
- Population: 78,117 (2021 census)
- Demonym: Rugbeian
- OS grid reference: SP5075
- District: Rugby
- Shire county: Warwickshire
- Region: West Midlands
- Country: England
- Sovereign state: United Kingdom
- Post town: RUGBY
- Postcode district: CV21, CV22, CV23
- Dialling code: 01788
- Police: Warwickshire
- Fire: Warwickshire
- Ambulance: West Midlands
- UK Parliament: Rugby

Rugby is a market town in eastern Warwickshire, England, close to the River Avon. At the 2021 census, its population was 78,117, making it the second-largest town in Warwickshire. It is the main settlement within the larger Borough of Rugby, which had a population of 114,400 in 2021.

Rugby is situated on the eastern edge of Warwickshire, near to the borders with Leicestershire and Northamptonshire. It is the most easterly town within the West Midlands region, with the nearby county borders also marking the regional boundary with the East Midlands. It is 83 miles (134 km) north of London, 30 miles (48 km) east-south-east of Birmingham, 11.5 miles (18.5 km) east of Coventry, 18 miles (29 km) north-west of Northampton and 19 miles (31 km) south-south-west of Leicester.

Rugby became a market town in 1255. In 1567, Rugby School was founded as free grammar school for local boys but, by the 18th century, it had gained a national reputation and eventually became a fee paying public school. The school is the birthplace of rugby football which, according to legend, was invented in 1823 by a Rugby schoolboy named William Webb Ellis. Rugby remained a small and fairly unimportant town until the mid-19th century, when a major railway junction was established there, which spurred the development of industry and the rapid growth of population.

== History ==
=== Ancient history ===
Early Iron Age settlement existed in the Rugby area: The River Avon formed a natural barrier between the Dobunni and Corieltauvi tribes, and it is likely that defended frontier settlements were set up on each side of the Avon valley. Rugby's position on a hill overlooking the Avon, made it an ideal location for a defended Dobunni watch settlement. During the Roman period the Roman town of Tripontium was established on the Watling Street Roman road around 3.4 miles (5.5 km) north-east of what is now Rugby, this was later abandoned when the Romans left Britain.

=== Medieval ===
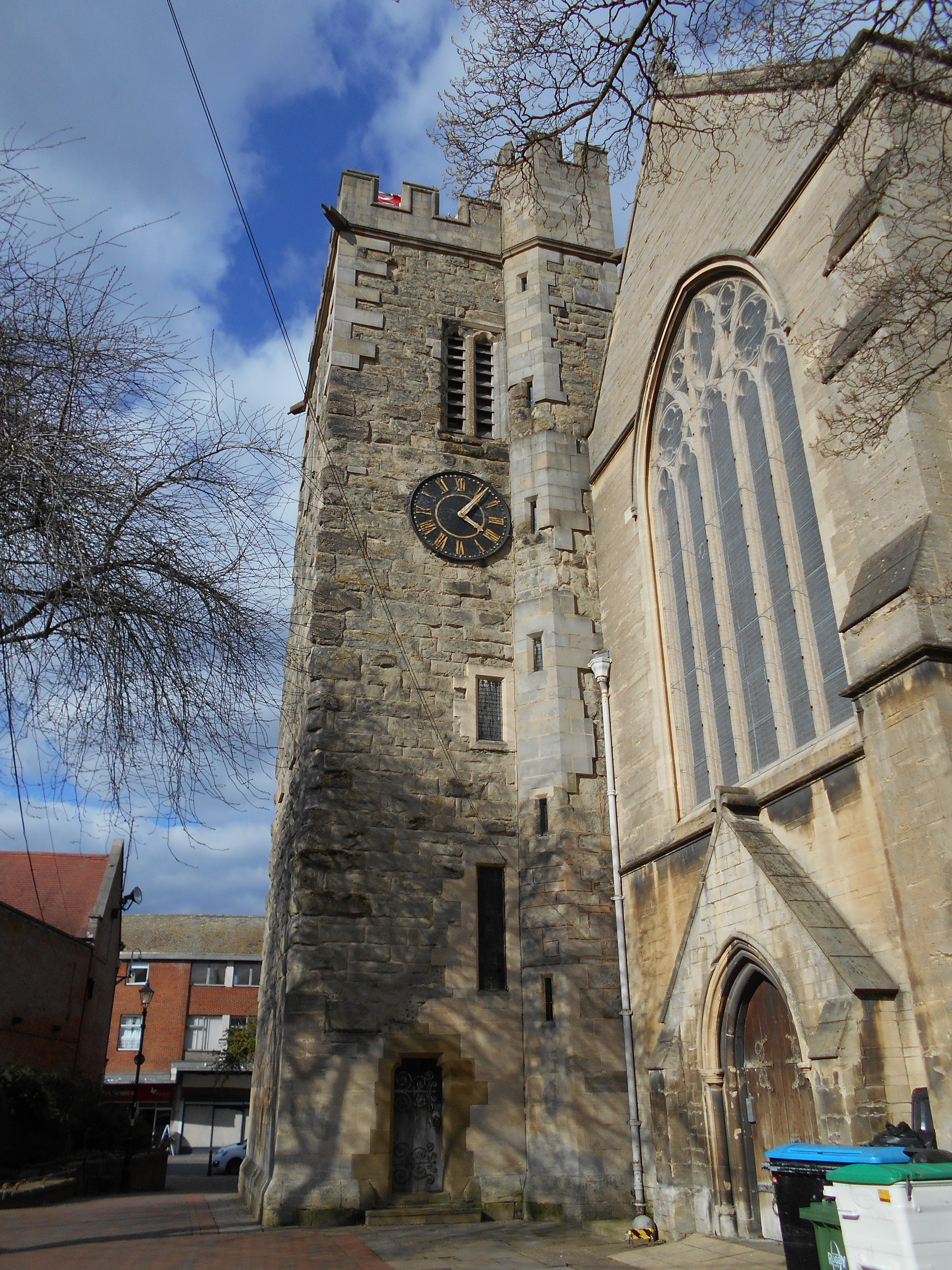
The west tower of St Andrew's Church, dating from the 13th or 14th century

The small settlement at Rugby was taken over by the Anglo-Saxons around 560 AD, and it was mentioned in the Domesday Book of 1086 as Rocheberie; there are several theories about the origin of the name; one is that it is derived from an old Celtic name droche-brig meaning 'wild hilltop'. Another theory is that Rocheberie was a phonetic translation of the Old English name Hrocaberg meaning 'Hroca's hill fortification'; Hroca being an Anglo-Saxon man's name pronounced with a silent 'H', and berg being a name for a hill fortification, with the 'g' being pronounced as an 'ee' sound. The first part of the name may also be Old English hrōc (> "rook"). By the 13th century the name of the town was commonly spelt as Rokeby (or Rookby) before gradually evolving into the modern form by the 18th century.

In 1140, the first recorded mention was made of St Andrew's Church, which was originally a chapel of ease to the mother church at Clifton-upon-Dunsmore, until Rugby was established as a parish in its own right in 1221, at which point it was elevated to the status of parish church. In 1255, the lord of the manor Henry de Rokeby obtained a charter to hold a weekly market in Rugby, which soon developed into a small country market town.

In the 12th century, Rugby was mentioned as having a castle at the location of what is now Regent Place. However, the nature of the 'castle' is unknown, and it was possibly little more than a fortified manor house. In any event, the 'castle' may have been short lived: It has been speculated that it was constructed early in the reign of King Stephen (1135–1154) during the period of civil war known as The Anarchy, and then, as a so-called adulterine castle, built without Royal approval, demolished in around 1157 on the orders of King Henry II. The earthworks for the castle were still clearly visible as late as the 19th century, but have since been built over. According to one theory, the stones from the castle were later used to construct the west tower of St Andrew's Church, which bears strong resemblance to a castle, and was probably intended for use in a defensive as well as a religious role.

=== 17th century ===
The Rugby area has associations with the Gunpowder Plot of 1605: On the eve of the plot, the plotters stayed at the 'Lion Inn' (now a private residence called 'Guy Fawkes House') in nearby Dunchurch, convened by Sir Everard Digby, awaiting news of Guy Fawkes's attempt to blow up the Houses of Parliament. If he had been successful they planned to kidnap the King's daughter Princess Elizabeth from Coombe Abbey in the countryside between Rugby and Coventry.

During the English Civil War, one of the earliest armed confrontations of the conflict took place at the nearby village of Kilsby in August 1642. That same year, King Charles I passed through Rugby on his way to Nottingham, and 120 Cavalier Horse Troops reportedly stayed at the town, however the townsfolk were sympathetic to the Parliamentarian cause, and they were disarmed by the Cavalier soldiers. Later, in 1645, Rugby was strongly Parliamentarian, and Oliver Cromwell and two regiments of Roundhead soldiers stayed at Rugby in April that year, two months before the decisive Battle of Naseby, some 12 miles (19 km) to the east, in nearby Northamptonshire.

=== Influence of Rugby School ===
Rugby School was founded in 1567 with money left in the will of Lawrence Sheriff, a locally born man, who had moved to London and made his fortune as the grocer to Queen Elizabeth I. Sheriff had intended Rugby School to be a free grammar school for local boys, but by the 18th century it had acquired a national reputation and gradually became a mostly fee-paying private school, with most of its pupils coming from outside Rugby. The Lawrence Sheriff School was eventually founded in 1878 to continue Sheriff's original intentions.

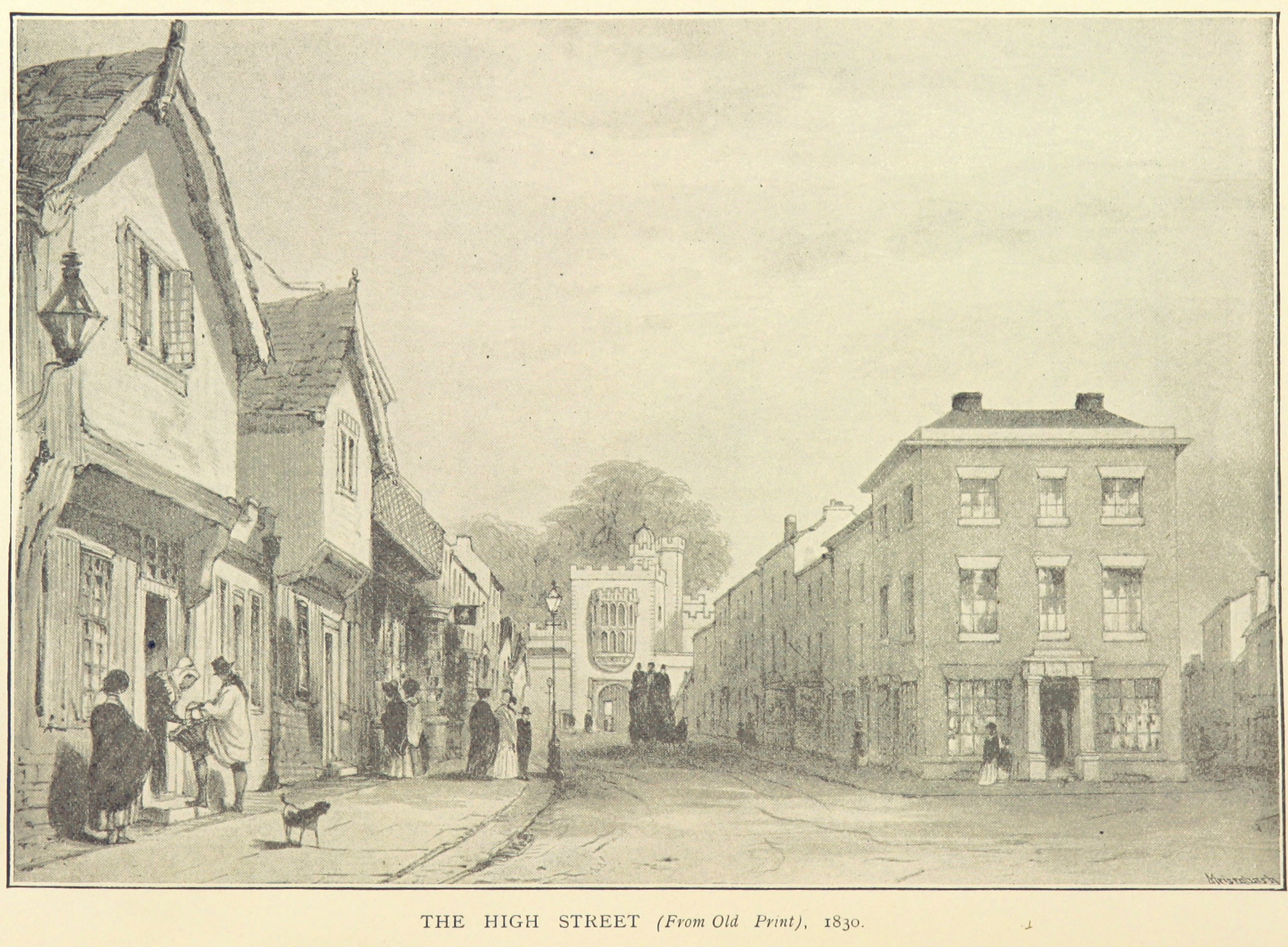
Rugby High Street in 1830

Until the 19th century, Rugby was a small and relatively unimportant settlement, with only its school giving it any notability. Its growth was slow, due in part to the nearby markets at Dunchurch and Hillmorton which were better positioned in terms of road traffic. In 1663 Rugby was recorded as containing 160 houses with a population of around 650. By 1730 this had increased to 183 houses, with a population of around 900. Rugby's importance and population increased more rapidly during the late 18th and early 19th century due to the growing national reputation of Rugby School, which had moved from its original location at a (now long vanished) schoolhouse north of St Andrew's Church, to its present location south of the town centre by 1750. By the time of the first national census in 1801, Rugby had a population of 1,487 with 278 houses. By 1831 this had increased further to 2,501 in 415 houses. This growth was driven by parents who wished to send their boys to Rugby School, but were unable to afford the boarding fees and so took up residence in Rugby, this in turn attracted domestic staff and tradesmen to the town to service the needs of the newcomers.

=== Railway town ===
At the dawn of the railway age in the early-19th century, Rugby found itself ideally positioned as a meeting place for various railway lines, consequently a major railway junction grew up here, and Rugby became a nationally important railway centre: The first railway arrived in 1838 when one of the earliest inter-city main lines, the London and Birmingham Railway (L&BR) was constructed around the town. In 1840 the Midland Counties Railway made a junction with the L&BR at Rugby, which was followed by a junction with the Trent Valley Railway in 1847. A line to Peterborough opened in 1850, followed by a line to Leamington in 1851, by which time there were more than sixty trains a day passing through Rugby railway station via the five converging lines. A line to Northampton opened in 1881, and finally the Great Central Main Line opened in 1899.

Rugby was transformed into a railway town, and the influx of railway workers and their families rapidly expanded the population. Rugby's population grew to nearly 8,000 by 1861. reaching nearly 17,000 by 1901. By which time around 1 in 5 Rugbeians were employed by the railways.

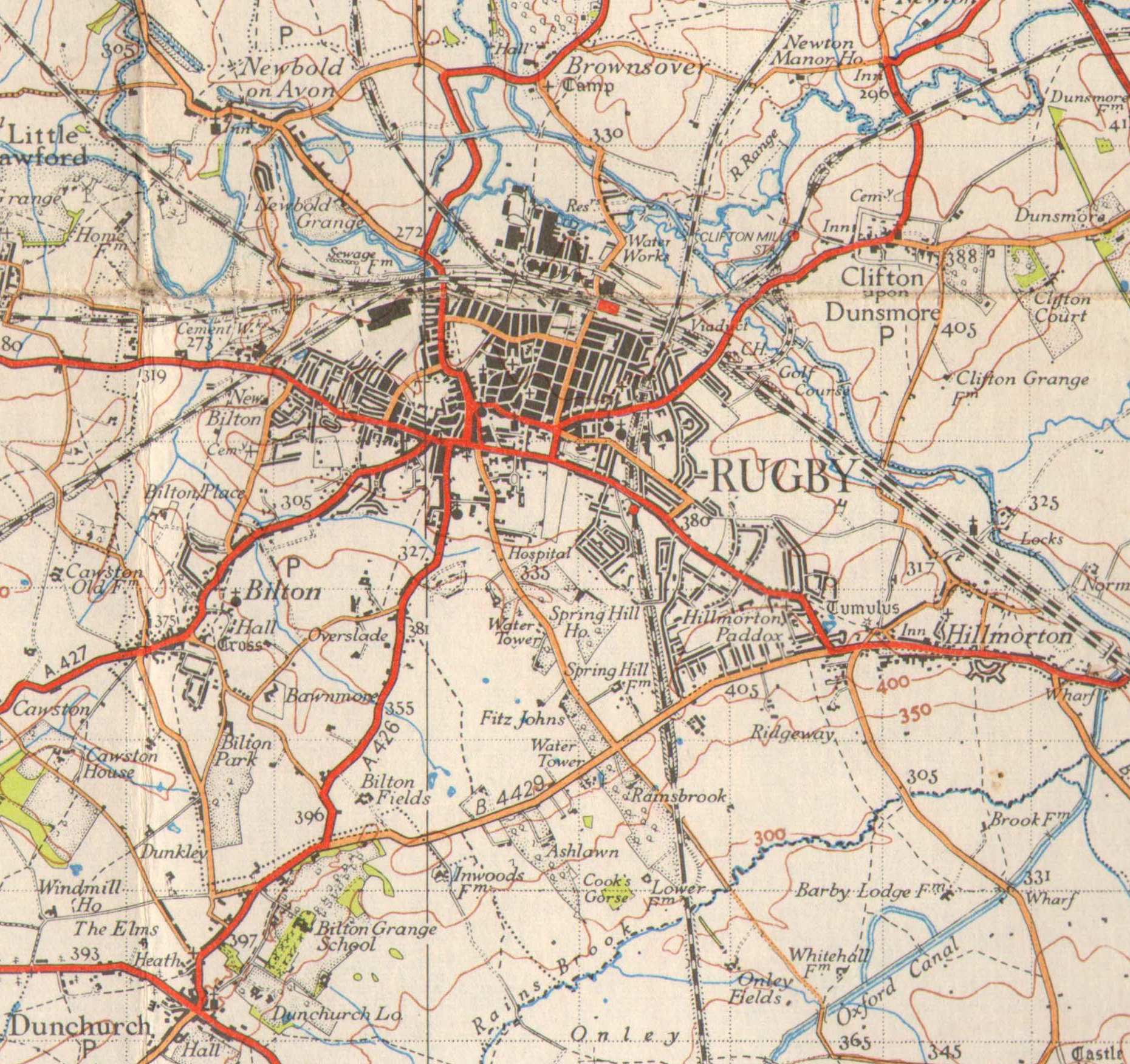
Map of Rugby from 1946

=== Growth of industry ===
The arrival of the railways had the effect of transforming Rugby from a rural backwater, into a substantial industrial town. In the later half of the 19th century, local industries began to develop: Large-scale cement production began in the town in 1862 when the Rugby Lias Lime & Cement Company Ltd was founded to take advantage of the locally available deposits of Blue Lias limestone. A factory producing corsets was opened in 1882, employing local women, this survived until 1992, by which time it was making swimwear.

In the 1890s and 1900s heavy engineering and electrical industries began to set up in Rugby, attracted by its central location and good transport links, causing the town to rapidly grow into a major industrial centre: Willans and Robinson were the first engineering firm to arrive in 1897, building steam engines to drive electrical generators, they were followed by British Thomson-Houston (BTH) in 1902, who manufactured electrical motors and generators. Within a short time, their product range expanded, and a wide array of electrical equipment came to be produced by BTH at Rugby. Both firms started producing turbines in 1904, and were in competition until both were united as part of GEC in 1969. Another name associated with Rugby was Lodge Plugs, manufacturer of spark plugs, who set up a factory in the town in 1916.

For most of the 20th century, the various engineering works dominated employment in Rugby; at their height in the 1960s, BTH alone employed around 22,000 people. Rugby expanded rapidly in the early decades of the 20th century as workers moved in. By the 1940s, the population of Rugby had grown to over 40,000, and then to over 50,000 by the 1960s.

=== Civic history ===
The parish of Rugby was made a local board district in 1849, which was the town's first modern form of local government; previously it had been governed by its vestry and manorial court. The local board's main responsibilities were to provide the town with infrastructure such as paved roads, street lighting, clean drinking water and sewerage. Such districts were converted into urban districts in 1894. Rugby's status was upgraded to that of a municipal borough in 1932, and its boundaries were expanded to incorporate the formerly separate villages of Bilton (including New Bilton), Hillmorton, Brownsover and Newbold-on-Avon which have become suburbs of the town. In 1974 the municipal borough was merged with the Rugby Rural District to form the present Borough of Rugby.

The Borough of Rugby will be abolished in 2028 as part of the 2027–28 local government reforms, and replaced by a new unitary authority of North Warwickshire, which will combine the area of the borough with the northern Warwickshire districts of Nuneaton and Bedworth and North Warwickshire.

=== Modern history ===
In the postwar years, Rugby became a major junction of the motorway network, with the M1 and M6, and M45 merging close to the town. The railways went into decline during the same period, with several of the railway lines into Rugby closed. Since the 1980s, the engineering industries have gone into steady decline, with many former industrial sites redeveloped for housing and retail. Due to its proximity to the motorway network, Rugby has become a major centre for logistics, becoming, in some definitions, part of the area known as the golden logistics triangle.

In the 21st century, Rugby's urban area has undergone further expansion with large new developments at Cawston and the large new development of Houlton on the site of the former Rugby Radio Station to the east of the town.

=== Fame ===
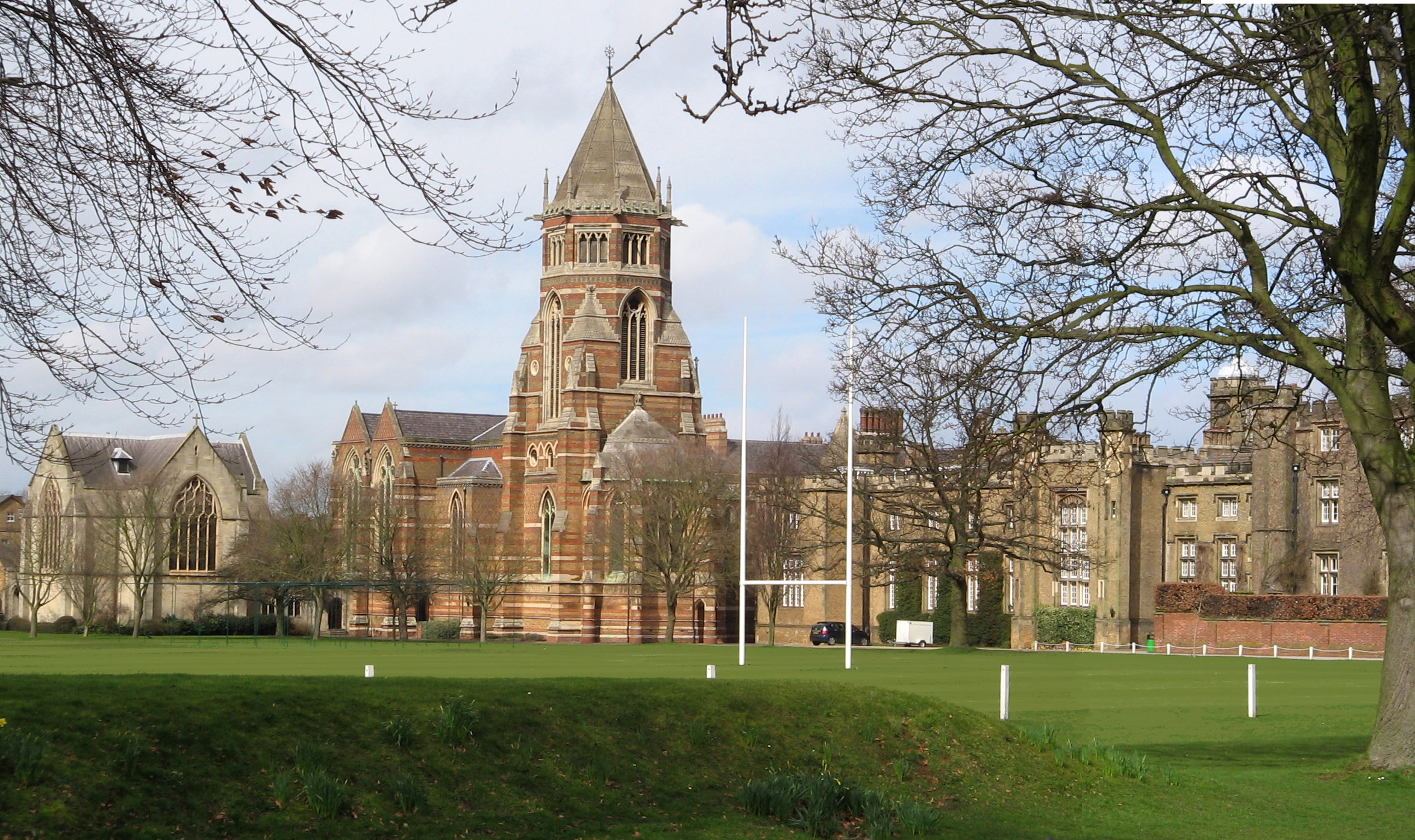
Rugby School.

Rugby is most famous for the invention of rugby football, which is played throughout the world. The invention of the game is credited to William Webb Ellis, a Rugby School pupil who, according to legend, broke the existing rules of football by picking up the ball and running with it at a match played in 1823. Although there is little evidence to support this story, the school is credited with codifying and popularising the sport. In 1845, three Rugby School pupils produced the first written rules of the "Rugby style of game".

Rugby School is one of England's oldest and most prestigious public schools, and was the setting of Thomas Hughes's semi-autobiographical masterpiece Tom Brown's Schooldays, published in 1857. Hughes later set up a colony in America for the younger sons of the English gentry, who could not inherit under the laws of primogeniture, naming the town Rugby. The settlement of Rugby, Tennessee still exists.

Pierre de Coubertin, a French educator and father of the modern Olympic Games, visited Rugby School several times in the late 19th century. He cited the school as one of his major inspirations behind his decision to revive the Olympic Games.

Rugby is a birthplace of the jet engine. In April 1937 Frank Whittle built and tested the world's first prototype jet engine at the British Thomson-Houston (BTH) works in Rugby, and during 1936–41 based himself at Brownsover Hall on the outskirts, where he designed and developed early prototype engines. Much of his work was carried out at nearby Lutterworth. Whittle is commemorated in Rugby by a modern sculpture near the town hall dating from 2005, made by Stephen Broadbent.

Holography was invented in Rugby in 1947, by the Hungarian born inventor Dennis Gabor, also while working at BTH. For this he later received the Nobel Prize in Physics in 1971.

In the 19th century, Rugby became famous for its once important railway junction which was the setting for Charles Dickens's story Mugby Junction.

== Rugby today ==
The modern town of Rugby is an amalgamation of the original town with the former settlements of Bilton, Hillmorton, Brownsover and Newbold-on-Avon which were incorporated into Rugby in 1932 when the town became a borough, all except Brownsover still have their former village centres. Rugby also includes the areas of New Bilton, Overslade, Hillmorton Paddox, Hillside and the partially constructed Houlton housing development. The spread of Rugby has nearly reached the villages of Clifton-upon-Dunsmore, Cawston, Dunchurch and Long Lawford.

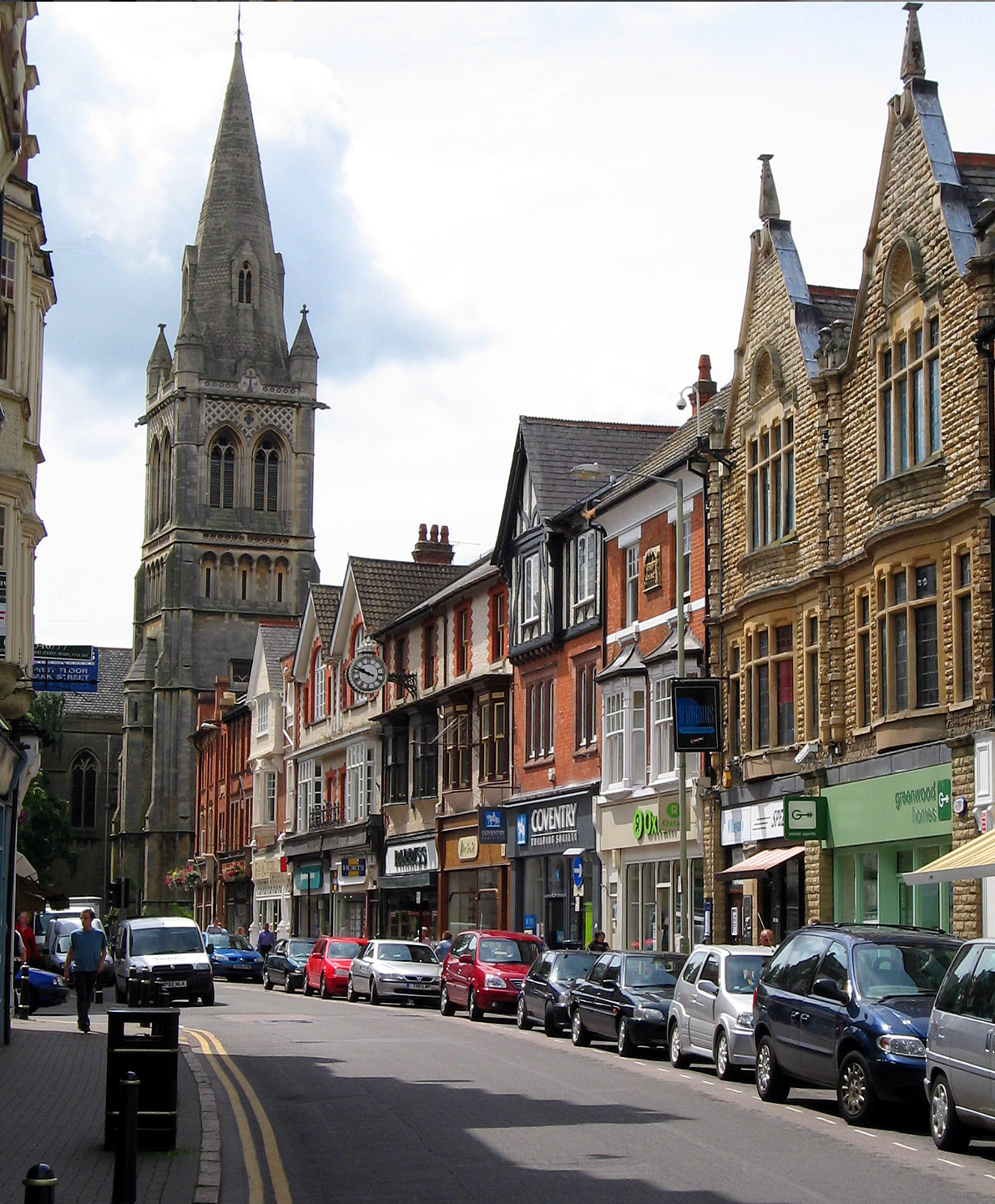
Regent Street and the tower of St Andrew's Church

=== Town centre ===
The town centre is mostly Victorian and early 20th century, however a few much older buildings survive, along with some more modern developments. Rugby was described by Nikolaus Pevsner as 'Butterfieldtown' due to the number of buildings designed by William Butterfield in the 19th century, including much of Rugby School and the extension of St Andrew's Church.

The main shopping area in Rugby has traditionally been in the streets around the Clock Tower, two of which – High Street and Sheep Street – were pedestrianised in the 1980s. Until the 19th century, Rugby's urban area consisted of only Market Place, High Street, Sheep Street, Church Street, North Street and what is now Lawrence Sheriff Street. These centred on what is now the Clock Tower, which was built in 1887 on the site of an ancient cross. These streets still form the core of the town centre. In the Victorian and Edwardian eras several more shopping streets were added to cater for the growing town, including Albert Street and Regent Street, the latter of which was built in 1905, and was intended to be Rugby's main shopping street, although it never achieved this goal. The town centre has an indoor shopping centre called Rugby Central Shopping Centre which opened in 1979 (previously named The Clock Tower shopping centre). A street market is held in the town centre several days a week. In recent years several out-of-town retail centres have opened and expanded to the north of the town, including: Elliott's Field Retail Park, Junction 1 Retail Park and Technology Drive.

== Geography ==
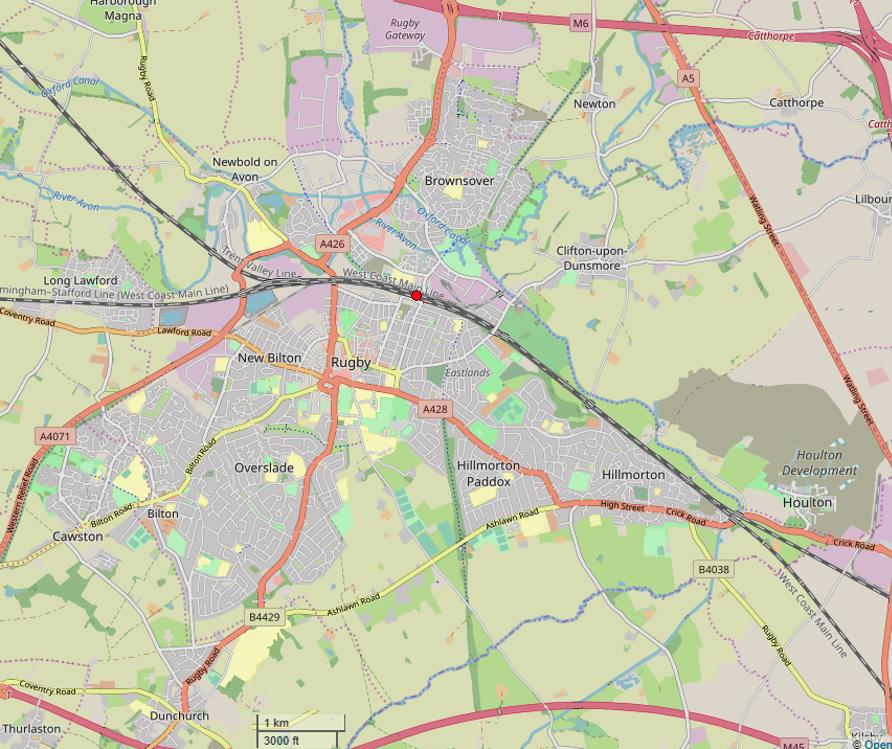
Map of Rugby

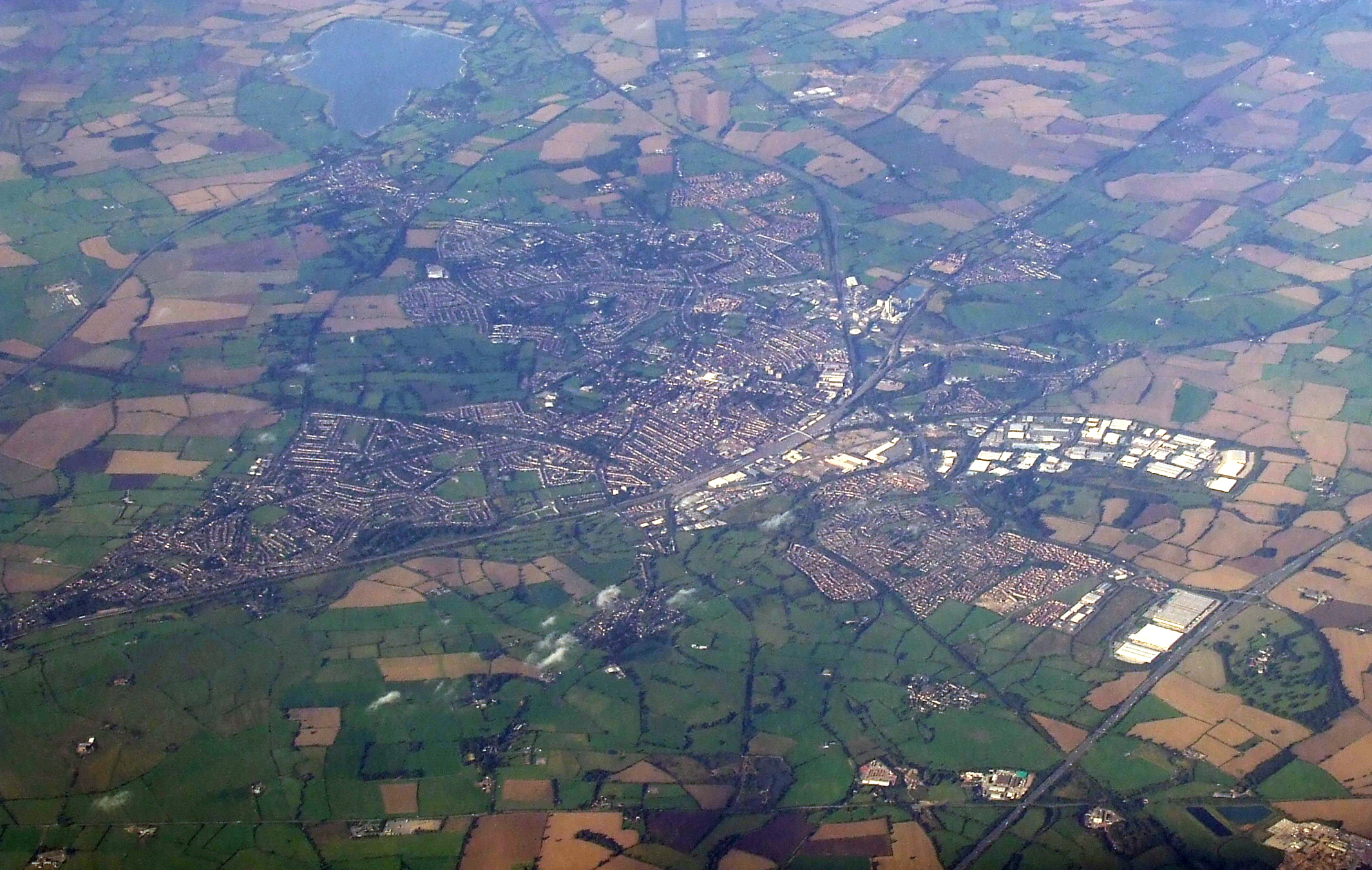
Aerial photograph of Rugby from the north-east.

Most of Rugby sits around 400 feet (120 m) above sea level on an irregular shaped plateau which is situated between the valleys of the River Avon and Swift to the north, and the Rains Brook and River Leam to the south. During its modern growth, Rugby spread north across the Avon valley and enveloped the villages of Brownsover and Newbold, which are to the north of the Avon valley.

The county boundary between Warwickshire, Northamptonshire and Leicestershire to the east of Rugby is defined by the A5 road (the former Watling Street) around 3 miles (4.8 km) east of Rugby town centre. The three counties meet at Dow Bridge; the point where the A5 road crosses the River Avon, forming a tripoint. To the south-east of Rugby the county boundary with Northamptonshire is defined by the Rains Brook. Rugby is the easternmost town within Warwickshire (and the entire West Midlands region)

Suburbs and districts

Suburbs and districts of Rugby include:

- Bilton
- Brownsover
- Hillmorton
- Hillside
- New Bilton
- Newbold-on-Avon
- Overslade
- Rokeby

Adjacent settlements

Places adjoining or adjacent to Rugby, but not part of the town itself:

- Cawston
- Clifton-upon-Dunsmore
- Dunchurch
- Houlton
- Long Lawford
- Newton

Nearby places

- Nearby cities: Birmingham, Coventry and Leicester
- Nearby towns: Bedworth, Daventry, Hinckley, Kenilworth, Leamington Spa, Lutterworth, Northampton, Nuneaton, Southam and Warwick.
- Nearby villages: Barby, Braunston, Brinklow, Catthorpe, Harborough Magna, Kilsby, Lilbourne, Monks Kirby, Newton and Pailton.

== Climate ==
Rugby has an oceanic climate typical of the English interior. Temperatures are mild for the latitude and winter nights average above freezing. Summers are highly variable depending on wind patterns, with an all-time record of 38.7 °C (101.7 °F) in spite of the mild averages. Annual rainfall is moderate, but frequent drizzle results in about 125 precipitation days per year.

Climate data for Church Lawford, 3 miles (4.8 km) from Rugby (1991–2020 normals), sunshine from Coventry, extremes 1983–present
Month	Jan	Feb	Mar	Apr	May	Jun	Jul	Aug	Sep	Oct	Nov	Dec	Year
Record high °C (°F)	14.7 (58.5)	17.7 (63.9)	22.4 (72.3)	25.5 (77.9)	27.5 (81.5)	31.3 (88.3)	38.7 (101.7)	34.6 (94.3)	30.6 (87.1)	27.6 (81.7)	18.4 (65.1)	15.3 (59.5)	38.7 (101.7)
Mean maximum °C (°F)	12.3 (54.1)	12.9 (55.2)	16.1 (61.0)	20.1 (68.2)	24.1 (75.4)	27.0 (80.6)	29.4 (84.9)	28.7 (83.7)	24.4 (75.9)	19.3 (66.7)	15.1 (59.2)	12.9 (55.2)	30.6 (87.1)
Mean daily maximum °C (°F)	7.1 (44.8)	7.8 (46.0)	10.4 (50.7)	13.6 (56.5)	16.7 (62.1)	19.8 (67.6)	22.3 (72.1)	21.8 (71.2)	18.7 (65.7)	14.3 (57.7)	10.0 (50.0)	7.4 (45.3)	14.2 (57.5)
Daily mean °C (°F)	4.3 (39.7)	4.7 (40.5)	6.6 (43.9)	9.0 (48.2)	11.9 (53.4)	14.9 (58.8)	17.1 (62.8)	16.9 (62.4)	14.4 (57.9)	10.9 (51.6)	7.1 (44.8)	4.6 (40.3)	10.2 (50.4)
Mean daily minimum °C (°F)	1.5 (34.7)	1.5 (34.7)	2.7 (36.9)	4.3 (39.7)	7.1 (44.8)	10.0 (50.0)	11.9 (53.4)	12.0 (53.6)	10.0 (50.0)	7.4 (45.3)	4.1 (39.4)	1.8 (35.2)	6.2 (43.1)
Mean minimum °C (°F)	−4.7 (23.5)	−4.3 (24.3)	−3.3 (26.1)	−1.7 (28.9)	0.3 (32.5)	4.6 (40.3)	6.9 (44.4)	6.6 (43.9)	4.0 (39.2)	0.9 (33.6)	−2.4 (27.7)	−4.7 (23.5)	−7.1 (19.2)
Record low °C (°F)	−14.5 (5.9)	−12.2 (10.0)	−8.5 (16.7)	−4.9 (23.2)	−2.2 (28.0)	−0.2 (31.6)	3.4 (38.1)	3.7 (38.7)	−0.1 (31.8)	−3.8 (25.2)	−8.2 (17.2)	−12.5 (9.5)	−14.5 (5.9)
Average precipitation mm (inches)	58.0 (2.28)	44.2 (1.74)	43.0 (1.69)	46.5 (1.83)	55.0 (2.17)	55.1 (2.17)	60.0 (2.36)	67.0 (2.64)	57.8 (2.28)	67.4 (2.65)	63.6 (2.50)	59.6 (2.35)	677.2 (26.66)
Average precipitation days (≥ 1.0 mm)	12.0	10.1	10.2	9.9	9.9	9.2	9.0	9.7	9.6	10.7	12.2	12.0	124.5
Mean monthly sunshine hours	55	75	115	147	192	185	198	180	137	101	63	61	1,509
Source 1: Met Office
Source 2: Infoclimat

== Demographics ==
At the 2021 census, there were 78,125 residents in Rugby, up from 70,628 on the 2011 census, and 62,580 at the 2001 census.

In terms of ethnicity in 2021:

- 84.3% of Rugby residents were White
- 8.3% were Asian
- 3.1% were Black
- 3.0% were Mixed.
- 1.1% were from another ethnic group.

In terms of religion, 52.9% of Rugby residents identified as Christian, 38.6% said they had no religion, 4.0% were Hindu, 2.3% were Muslim, 1.2% were Sikh, 0.4% were Buddhists, and 0.6% were from another religion.

== Politics and governance ==
=== National representation ===
From 1885 until 1983 Rugby was a constituency in itself, a status it regained in 2010. Rugby was historically one of the Midlands' most marginal seats. From 1885 until 1924 Rugby was a marginal seat which changed hands between the Conservative and Liberal parties. From 1924 until 1942, the prominent Conservative David Margesson was Rugby's MP, his resignation triggered the 1942 Rugby by-election which was won by an independent trade unionist William Brown, who retained the seat until losing it to James Johnson of the Labour Party in 1950. From 1950 until 1983 Rugby was a Labour-Conservative marginal, with the Labour Party holding it for the majority of that period.

In 1983 Rugby was joined with Kenilworth to become part of the parliamentary constituency of Rugby and Kenilworth. Between 1983 and 1997 Jim Pawsey was the Conservative Member of Parliament, losing in 1997 to Labour's Andy King. At the 2005 general election Jeremy Wright regained the seat for the Conservatives.

Following the recommendations of the Boundary Commission for England, Warwickshire was allocated a sixth parliamentary seat. In the 2010 general election, the existing Rugby and Kenilworth constituency was abolished and split in two. A new Rugby constituency was created, and a new constituency of Kenilworth and Southam formed to the south of Rugby, and as a result the town regained its pre-1983 status of returning its own member of parliament, albeit with the addition of the Bulkington Ward from Nuneaton. Jeremy Wright chose to stand for Kenilworth and Southam in the 2010 general election and was successful. Mark Pawsey, son of former Rugby MP Jim Pawsey, was elected for Rugby in 2010. In the 2024 general election the Labour Party's John Slinger won the seat from the Conservatives.

=== Local government ===
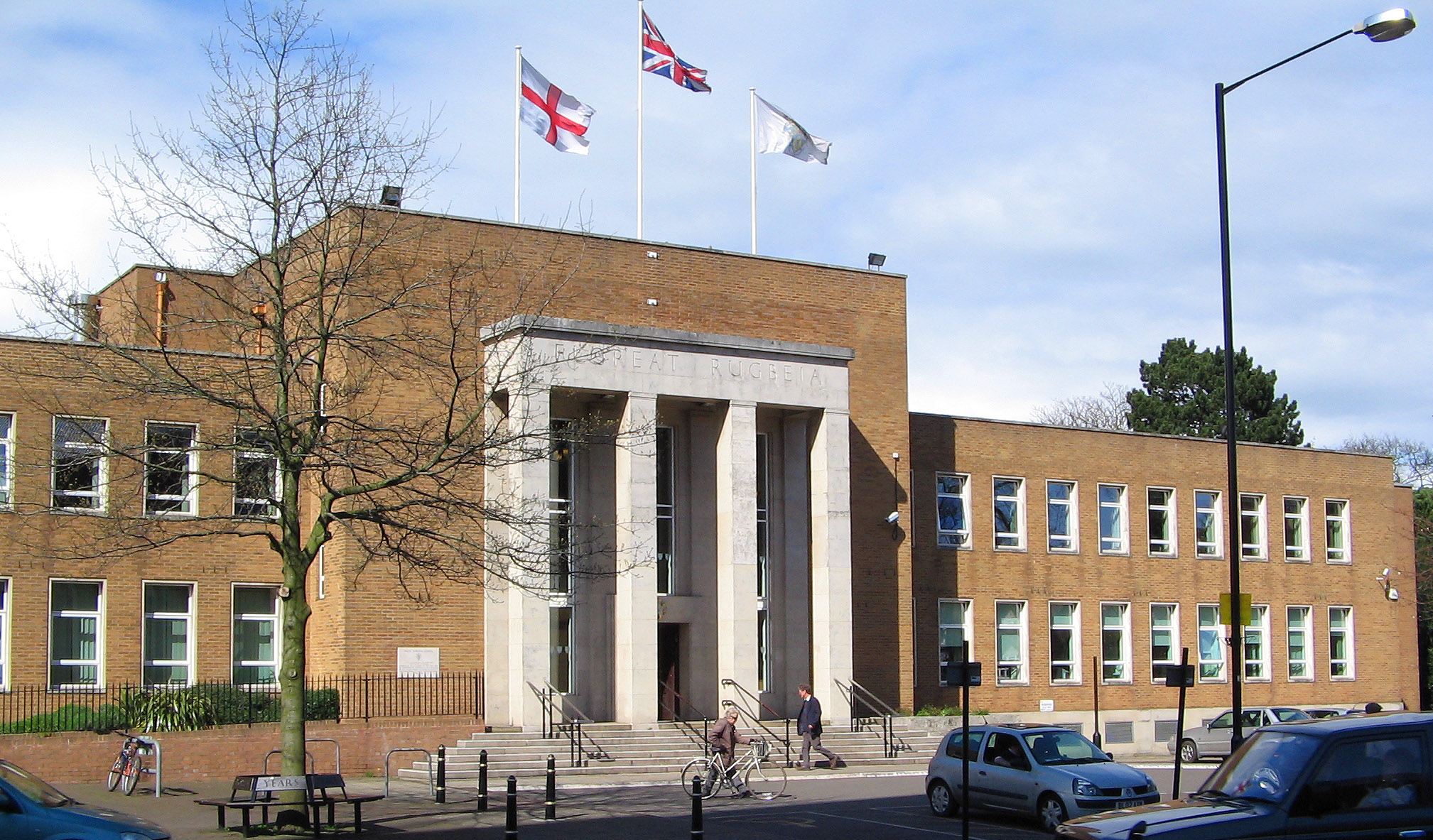
Rugby Town Hall (1961) – The headquarters of Rugby Borough Council

Rugby is administered by two local authorities: Rugby Borough Council which covers Rugby and its surrounding countryside, and Warwickshire County Council. The two authorities are responsible for different aspects of local government. Rugby is an unparished area and so does not have its own town council.

The Borough of Rugby was created in its current form in 1974, with the first elections held in 1973, since then, Rugby Borough Council has spent the majority of its time under no overall control, alternating with periods of Conservative control. (see Rugby Borough Council elections) since 2023 it has been under no overall control.

The Borough of Rugby will be abolished in 2028 as part of the 2027–28 local government reforms, and replaced by a new unitary authority of North Warwickshire, which will combine the area of the borough with the northern Warwickshire districts of Nuneaton and Bedworth and North Warwickshire. Concurrent with these changes, in 2026, a consultation is underway for the creation of a civil parish and town council for Rugby.

=== Public services ===
Rugby is covered by Warwickshire Police and Warwickshire Fire and Rescue Service. Ambulance services are covered by the West Midlands Ambulance Service.

The local hospital in Rugby is the Hospital of St. Cross which is part of the University Hospitals Coventry and Warwickshire NHS Trust. A more extensive range of health services are provided at the University Hospital Coventry, some ten miles away.

== Culture and recreation ==
The largest general purpose venue in Rugby is the Benn Hall which opened in 1961 as part of the town hall complex, Rugby has two theatres, a professional theatre, the Macready Theatre, and the amateur Rugby Theatre, both in the town centre. A nine-screen cinema run by Cineworld is located at a retail park north of the town centre.

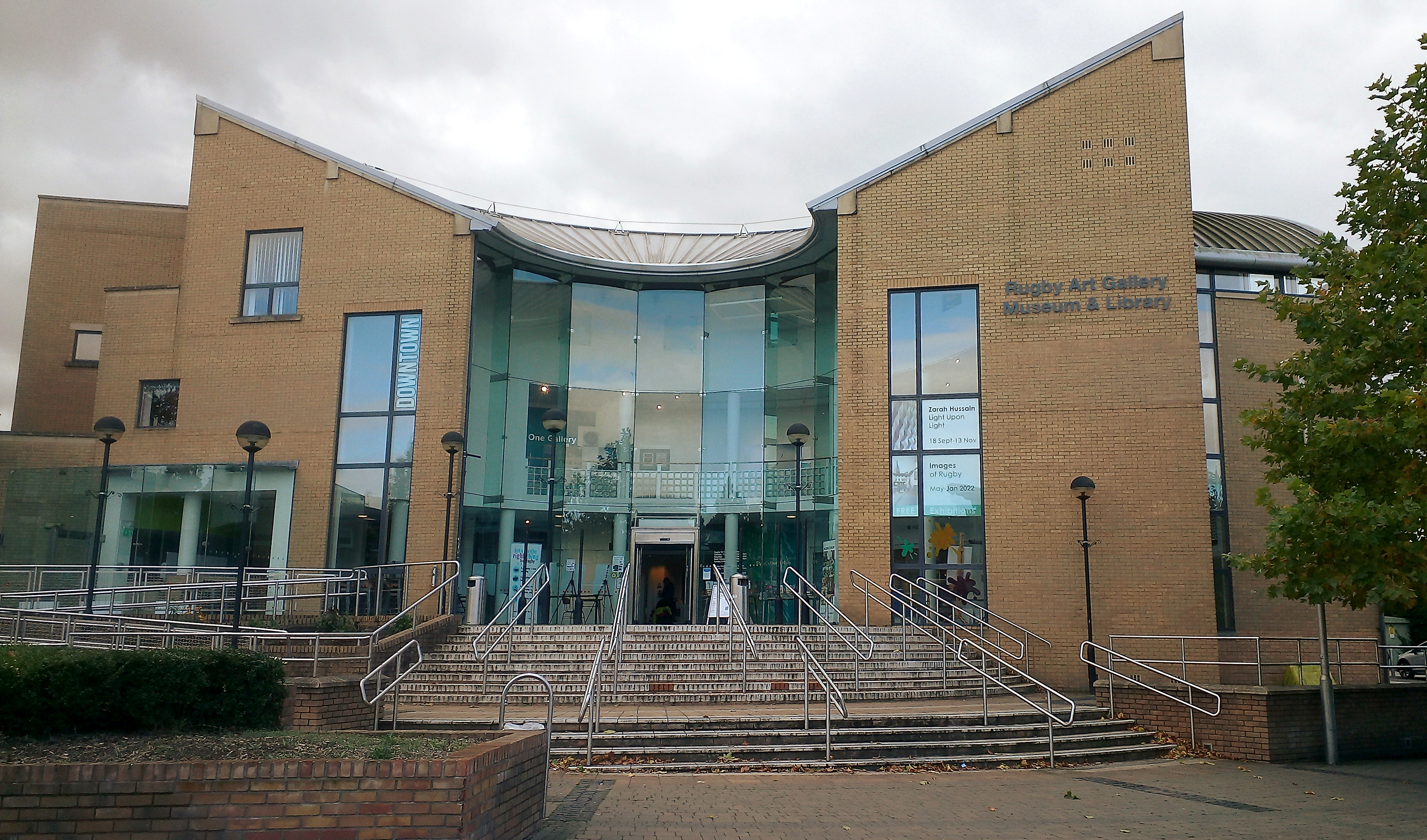
The Rugby Art Gallery, Museum and Library

The Rugby Art Gallery, Museum and Library which opened in 2000, hosts various temporary art exhibitions. The main collection, which is not on permanent display, is the nationally renowned Rugby Collection of 20th Century and Contemporary British Art, which comprises 170 artworks by artists including L. S. Lowry, Stanley Spencer, Paula Rego and Graham Sutherland. The museum displays Roman artefacts excavated from the nearby Romano-British town of Tripontium, as well as an exhibition of the social history of Rugby. The building also houses the town's library.

The Webb Ellis Rugby Football Museum, also in the town centre, hosts rugby memorabilia.

The poet Rupert Brooke was born and grew up in Rugby, and is commemorated in the town by a statue in Regent Place.

In the 1960s, Clifton Hall at Rugby was owned by the music manager Reginald Calvert and became a centre of the Midlands rock music scene, with a number of Midlands bands such as The Fortunes, and the local band Pinkerton's Assorted Colours starting their careers there. In the 1980s the influential rock band Spacemen 3 was formed in Rugby by the local musicians Jason Pierce and Pete Kember. Following its demise in 1991, both musicians went on to form successful subsequent projects; Pierce formed the critically acclaimed band Spiritualized and Kember continued performing under the names Sonic Boom/Spectrum. Other notable musical acts to emerge from Rugby include the 1970s pop band Jigsaw which was formed by musicians from Rugby and Coventry, the 2000s singer-songwriter James Morrison, and more recently Emily Burns.

There are two large urban parks in the town centre, one is Caldecott Park alongside the town hall, and on the edge of the town centre is the Whitehall Recreation Ground.

Rugby has an indoor leisure centre, the Queen's Diamond Jubilee Centre which opened in 2013, replacing the older Ken Marriott Leisure Centre, it is run by GLL a charitable social enterprise on behalf of the local council.

=== Sport ===
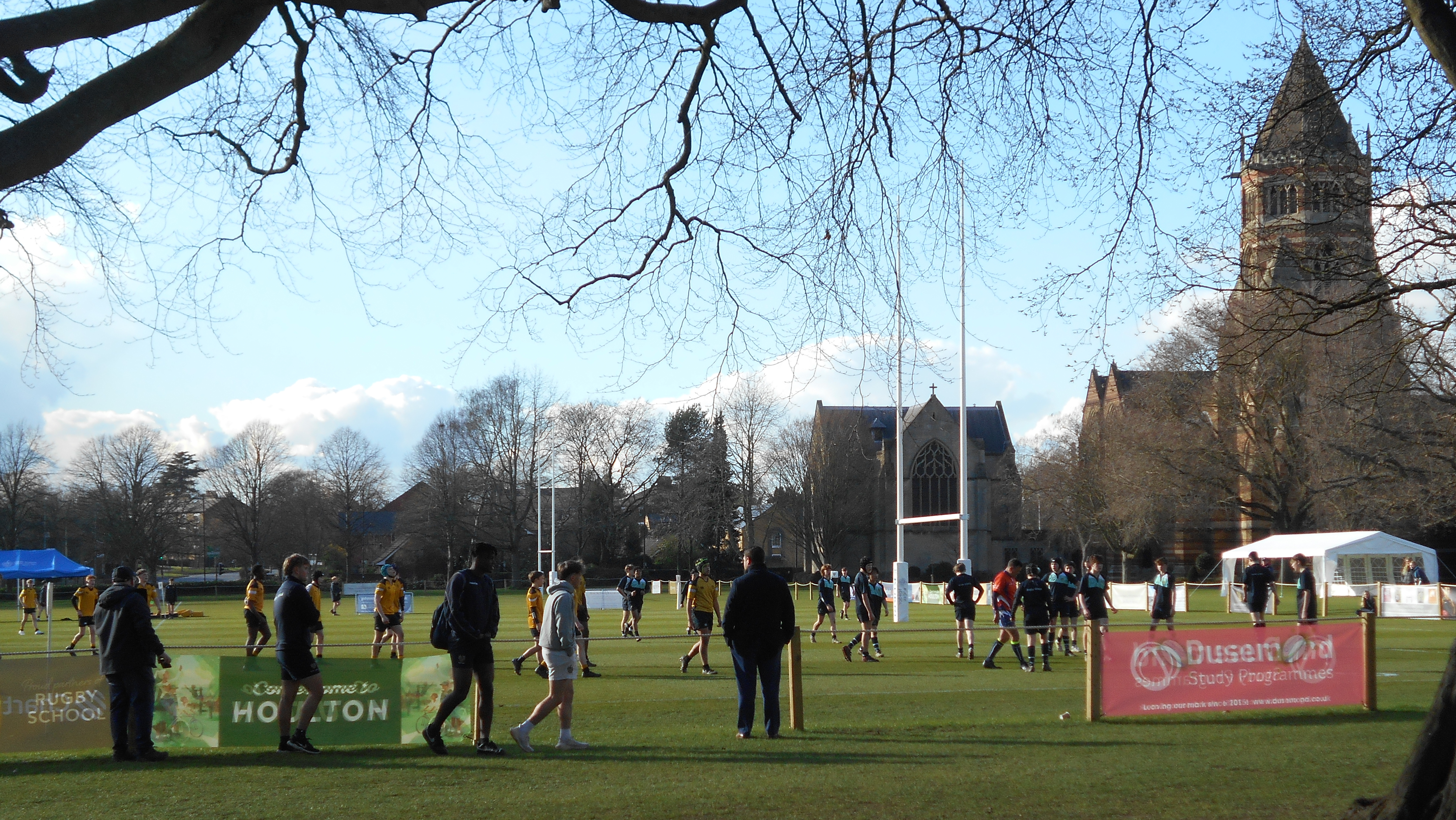
Game of Rugby being played on 'The Close' at Rugby School, where the game was invented.

- Rugby has a number of rugby union teams including; the Rugby Lions, Rugby Welsh, Rugby St. Andrews RFC, Newbold-on-Avon RFC, AEI (Rugby) Rugby Football Club and Old Laurentian RFC.
- Rugby has two non-league football clubs, Rugby Town F.C., who play in the United Counties League Premier Division, and Rugby Borough F.C., formed in 2017, who were Leicestershire Senior League Division One Champions in 2017–18. Rugby also has an established Sunday League setup, featuring 24 teams and promoting positive grassroots football in the area. The Rugby & District Sunday League has three divisions and numerous cup competitions, with cup finals held at Rugby Town F.C. Many teams such as Rugby Rovers & AFC Rugby support local charity OurJay Foundation featuring their logo on team kits.
- There are two golf courses near the town: Rugby Golf Club to the East, and Whitefields Golf Club to the South West.
- The Rugby Lawn Tennis Club, is one of the oldest in the world, having been established in 1876.
- Rugby's artistic swimming Club is competitive on a regional and national level.

== Economy ==
For most of the 20th Century manufacturing was the largest employer in Rugby. Manufacturing employment peaked in the 1950s, and has gone into steady decline since, and service industries are now the largest source of employment.

In 2017 the average annual workplace wage in the Rugby borough was £29,059; above the Warwickshire (£28,513) and UK (£28,296) averages.

=== Engineering and manufacturing ===
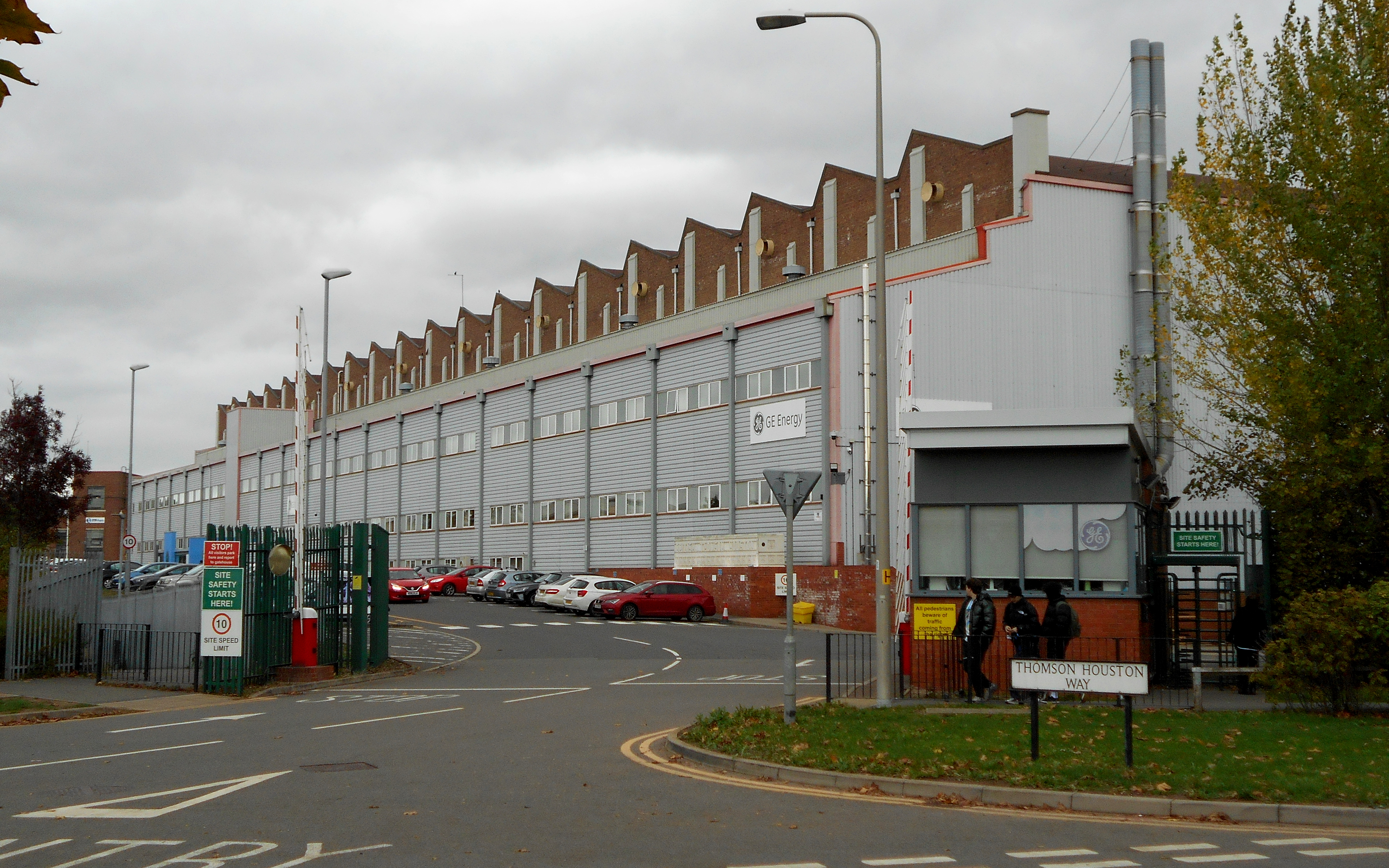
The GE Power engineering facility in Rugby.

Rugby remains an engineering centre and has a long history of producing gas and steam turbines and electrical equipment. Engineering in Rugby has taken place under a myriad of different companies; it was established in the 1900s by British Thomson-Houston (BTH) and Willans & Robinson, which later became parts of Associated Electrical Industries (AEI) and English Electric respectively, until both were united as part of the General Electric Company (GEC) in the late-1960s, which itself merged with Alstom in 1989. Most of the engineering works in Rugby were based in the Avon valley area north of the railway station, since the 1980s much of the engineering works have closed with their land sold off for housing and commercial development, however engineering still continues in Rugby on a smaller scale under the auspices of GE Vernova (formerly GE Power Conversion), which produces large electric motors, and services and manufactures steam turbines. In 2019 the Rugby site was threatened with closure, but was saved following an order for motors from the Ministry of Defence, after the House of Commons Defence Select Committee, decided that closing the site would lead to a 'loss of sovereign capability and security'.

Further afield, within the Rugby borough is the Rolls-Royce engineering works near Ansty. This is nearer to Coventry than Rugby.

Rugby is also a centre of laser manufacturing: This was started by the local firm JK Lasers, which was founded in 1972. In 1982 JK Lasers merged with Lumonics of Canada and was for a time one of the largest industrial laser companies in the world. Following takeovers and mergers, the JK Lasers brand name disappeared in 2015, and it is now part of SPI Lasers, a subsidiary of the Trumpf company. In 2018, SPI Lasers announced that their manufacturing site at Rugby was to be doubled in size. A second laser manufacturing firm in Rugby is Litron Lasers, which was established in 1997.

=== Cement ===
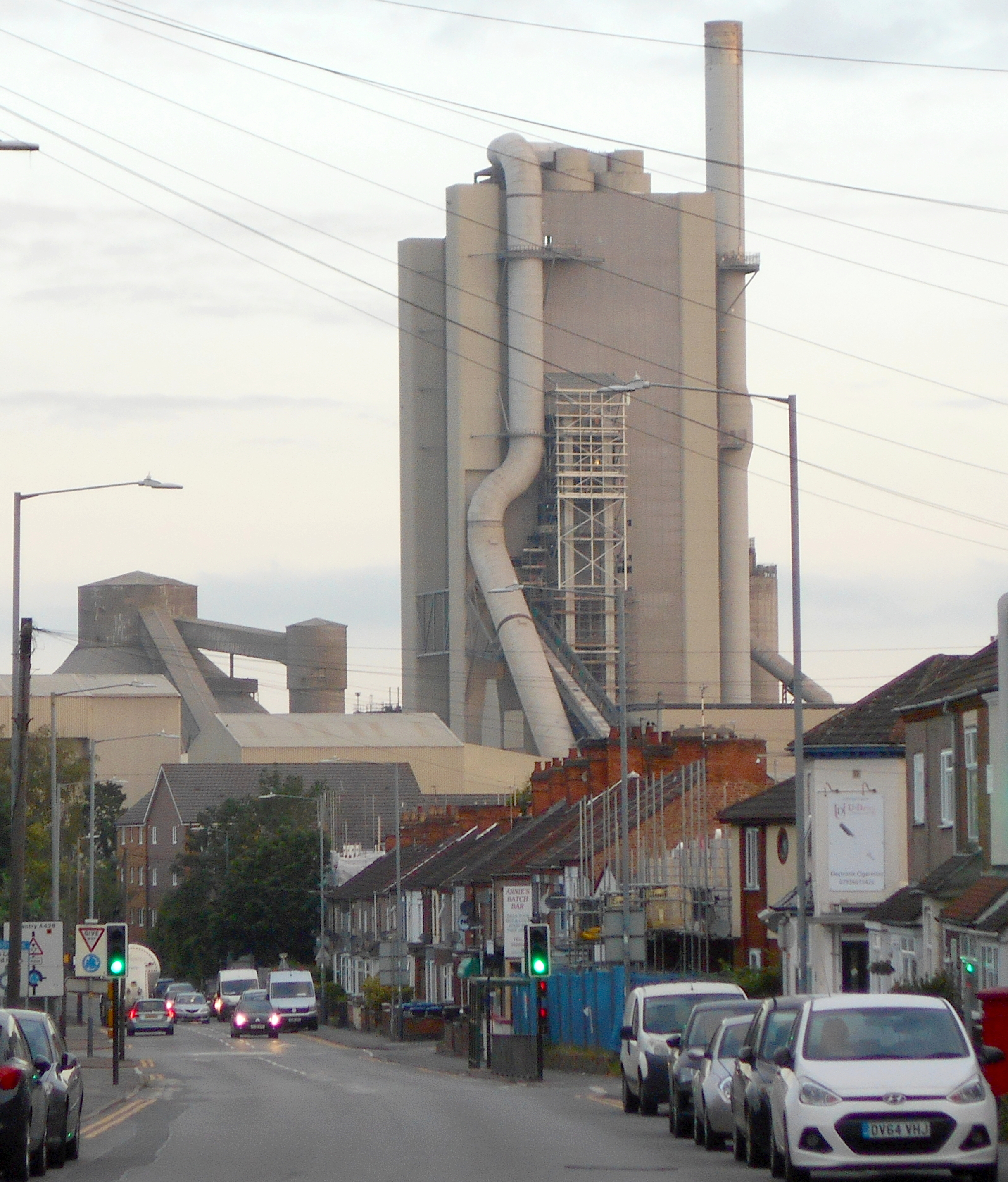
Rugby cement works at New Bilton

Another major industry in Rugby is cement making; This industry started on a small scale locally in the early 19th century, but began on a large scale in the 1860s when the Rugby Cement company was founded, making cement from the local Jurassic Blue Lias limestone at New Bilton. The current cement works at Rugby has the largest cement kiln in the UK, capable of producing 1.8 million tonnes of cement a year. The current plant was opened in 2000, having been rebuilt and substantially enlarged in the late-1990s, upon its opening other Rugby Cement plants at Southam and Rochester were closed, with all production moved to the enlarged Rugby plant. Rugby Cement was taken over in 2000 and is now owned by the Mexican firm Cemex, who moved their UK headquarters to Rugby in 2018.

=== Logistics ===
Rugby is often described as being part of the area known as the golden logistics triangle due to its central location and good transport links. In 2021 Rugby had the highest percentage of business units used for transport and storage in the UK, at 17%. Since the 1980s several large industrial estates have been built to the north, and warehousing, distribution and light industry have become major employers. This is due to the town's close proximity to the M6 motorway (Junction 1) and M1 (Junction 19), at the heart of the UK's motorway network. In 2017 nearly half of Warwickshire's businesses in the 'Transport and storage' sector were in Rugby. In 2017 Hermes opened its 'Midlands Super Hub' parcel delivery depot at the Rugby Gateway development to the north of the town, which is the largest of its type in the UK. To the east of Rugby is the large Daventry International Rail Freight Terminal (DIRFT), which opened in the 1990s; although this is across the county border in Northamptonshire, it is closest to Rugby.

=== Organisations based in Rugby ===
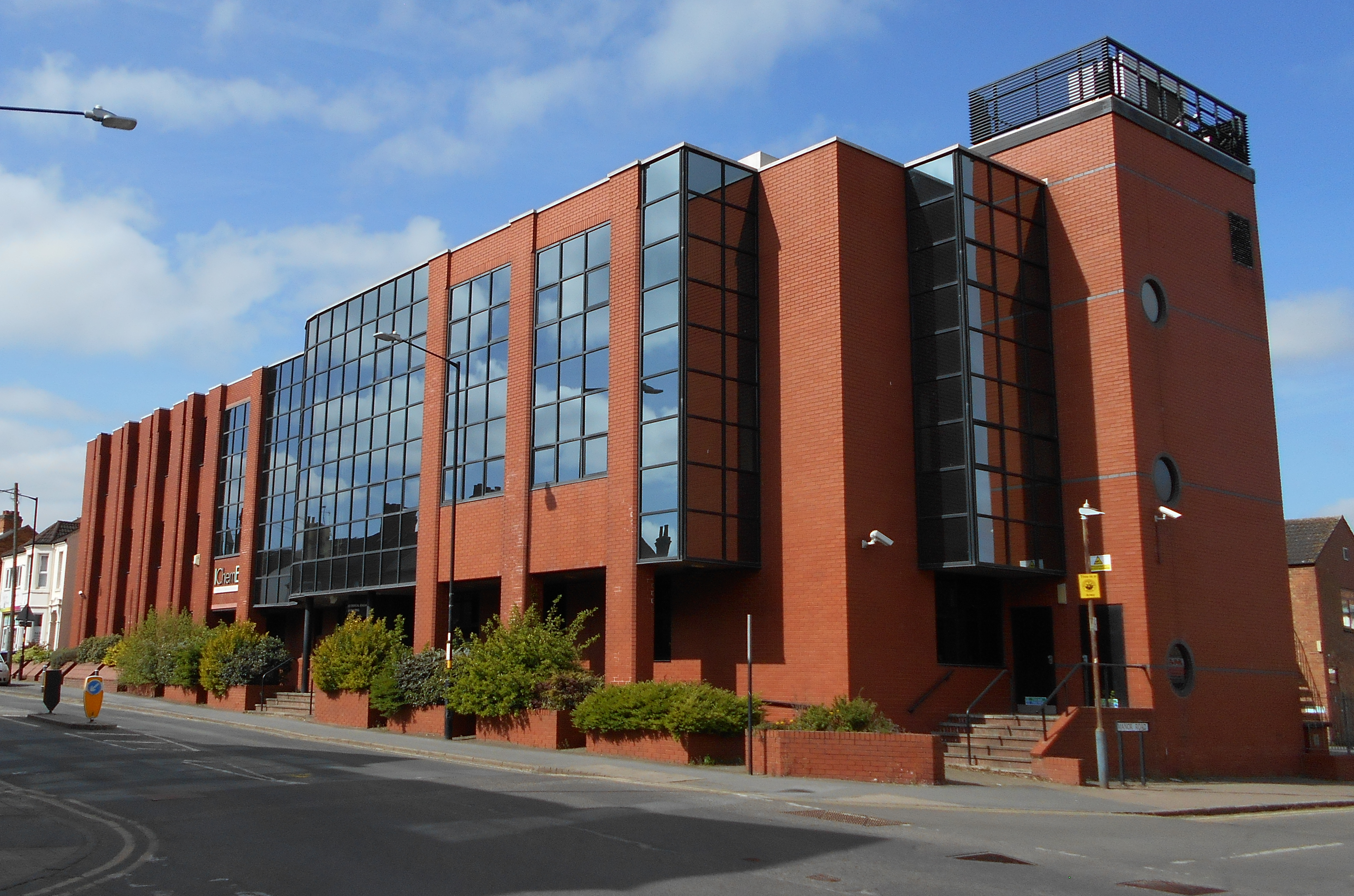
Headquarters of the Institution of Chemical Engineers (IChemE) in Rugby.

The American fashion retailer Gap Inc. has had its UK headquarters and distribution centre in Rugby since 2002, as does the construction firm Morgan Sindall, and the historic legal firm Brethertons. In addition a number of trade, professional and charitable organisations have headquarters in Rugby, including the Institution of Chemical Engineers, the Institution of Lighting Professionals, the Master Locksmiths Association, the Auto-Cycle Union, the Oral Health Foundation, and the development charity Practical Action.

=== Tourism and other ===
Tourism is also important to the town's economy, especially related to Rugby football.

One of the last links to Rugby's rural past was the cattle market held near the railway station, and earlier in the "Market Place" in the old centre of Rugby since medieval times. The market near the railway station was closed in late 2008 and the site has been redeveloped into housing, a hotel and a Tesco store as part of a wider scheme of work in the station area.

== Notable buildings and landmarks ==
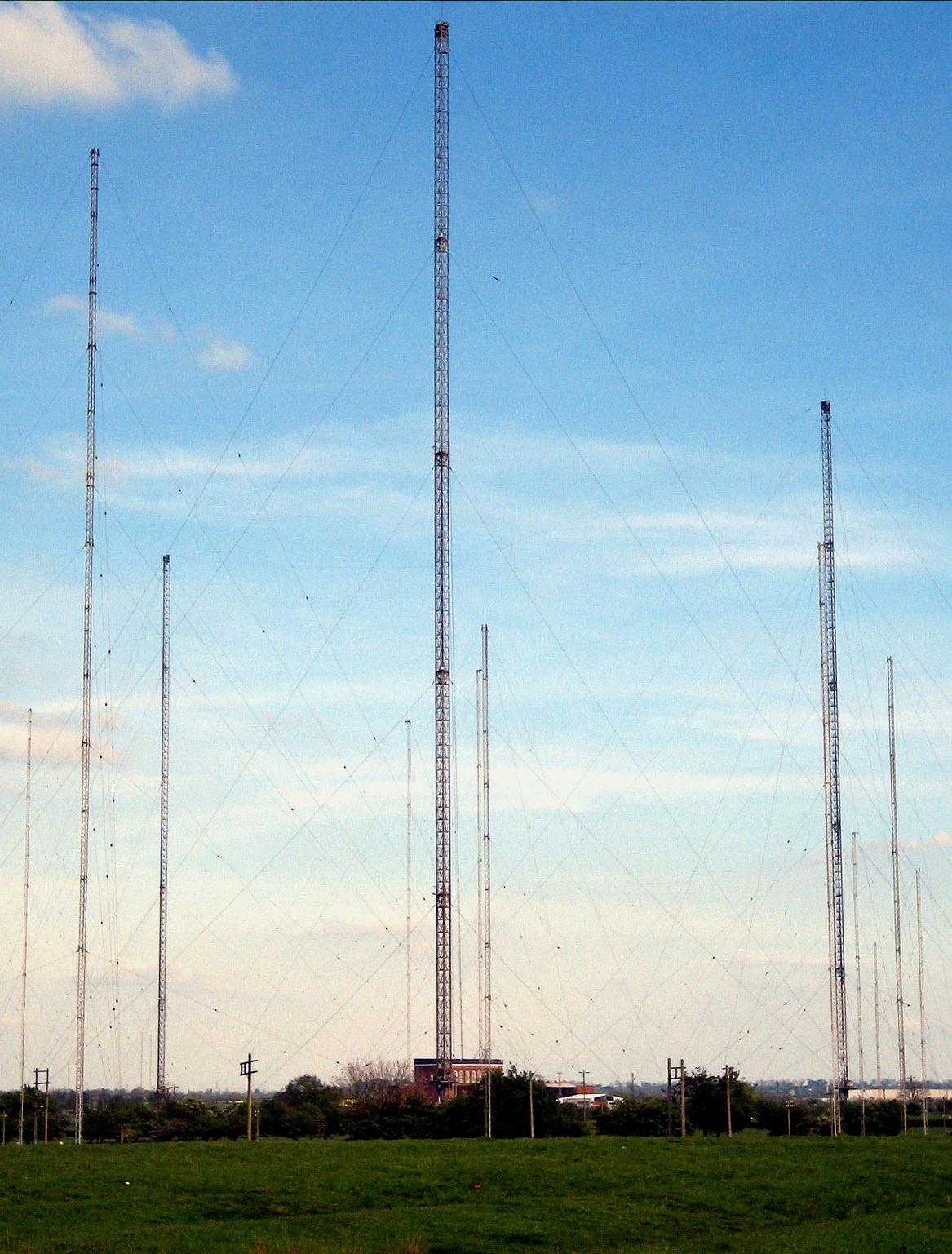
Rugby Radio Station (now demolished)

One of the most notable landmarks around Rugby was, until August 2007, the Rugby Radio Station, a large radio transmitting station just to the east of the town. The station was opened in 1926, at its height in the 1950s it was the largest radio transmitting station in the world, with a total of 57 radio transmitters, covering an area of 1600 acres. Traffic slowly dwindled from the 1980s onwards, and the site was closed between 2003 and 2007. Several of the masts were decommissioned and demolished by explosives in 2004, although a few, including four of the biggest masts remained until 2007. (Firing the explosive charges was delayed by rabbits gnawing the wires). The remaining four 'tall' masts were demolished on the afternoon of 2 August 2007 with no prior publicity. The site is now being developed as a new housing development known as Houlton

Rugby Cement works, is to the west of the town. The main tower of the cement works stands at 400 feet (120 m) tall, and can be seen from as far away as the Cotswolds and the Malvern Hills in Worcestershire. The landmark is controversial; in 2005 it came in the top ten of a poll of buildings people would like to see demolished on the Channel 4 television series Demolition. In October 2006, the owners of the Rugby Cement works, Cemex, were fined £400,000 for excessive pollution after a court case brought by the Environment Agency.

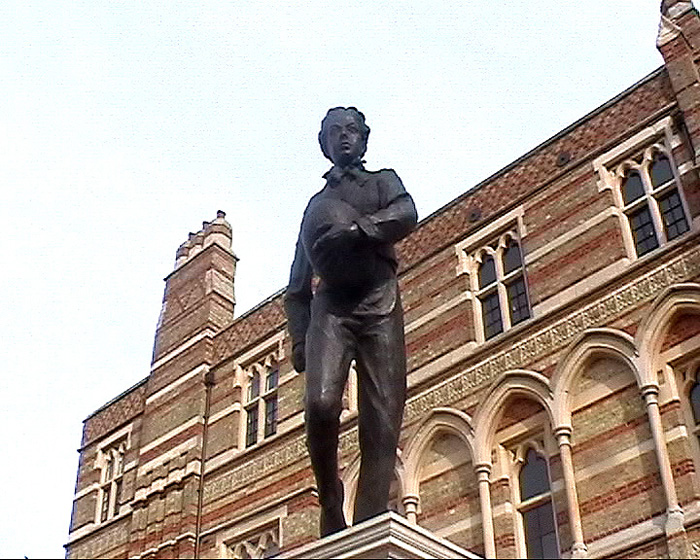
William Webb Ellis' statue

The town has statues of three famous locals: Rupert Brooke, Thomas Hughes and William Webb Ellis. The Rupert Brooke statue is situated at the forked junction of Regent Street on the green and commemorates his contribution to poetry. Thomas Hughes' statue stands in the gardens of the Temple Reading Rooms (the central library of Rugby school) on Barby Road. Since England won the Rugby World Cup in 2003, the William Webb Ellis statue outside Rugby School is one of the most visited parts of the town.

As the main growth of Rugby occurred in the 19th century. The central area of Rugby, is known for its many fine examples of Victorian architecture, these include:

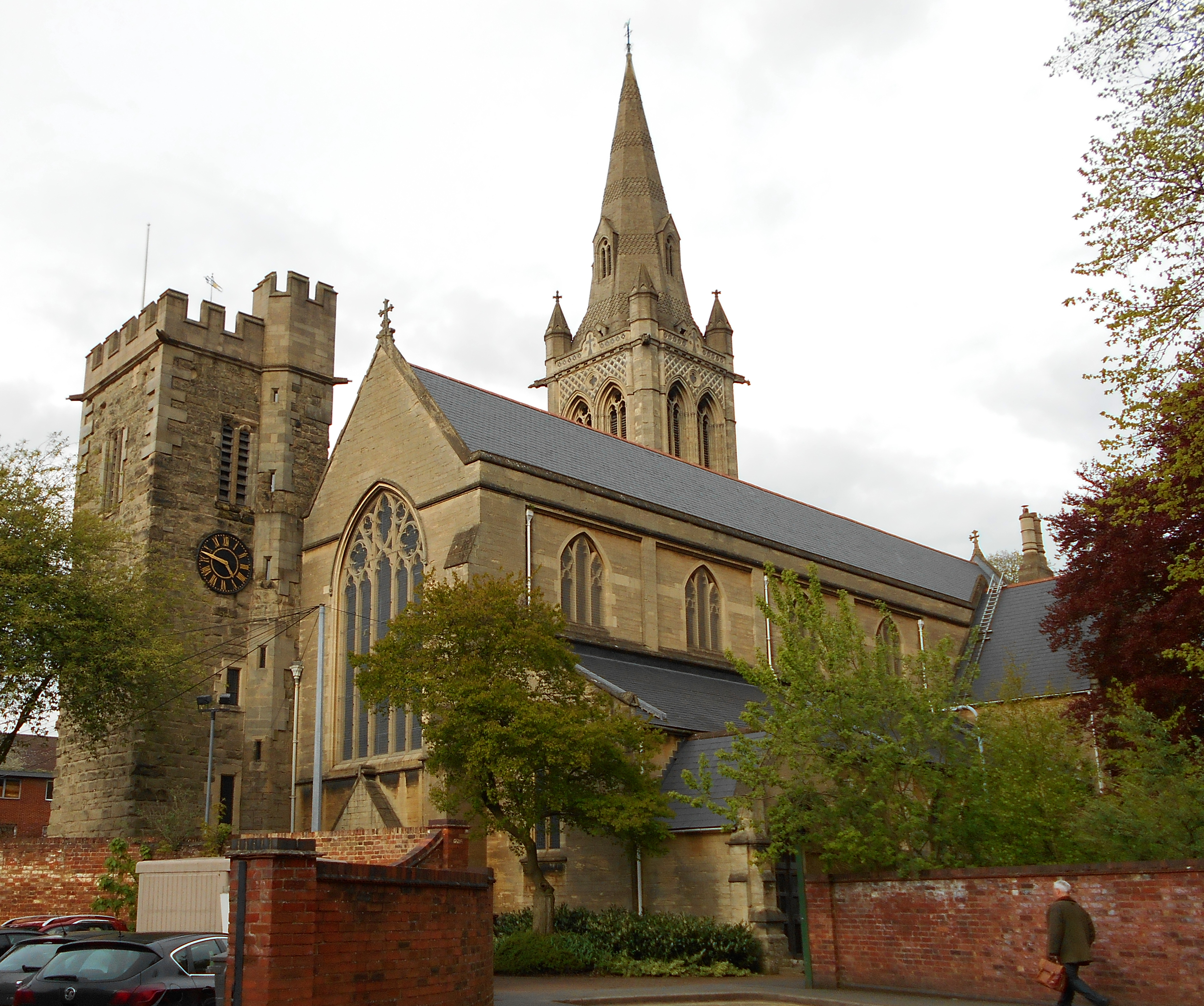
St Andrew's Church

St Andrew's Church, in the town centre, is Rugby's original Church of England parish church. A church has stood on the site since 1140. The oldest surviving part of the church is the 22 metre high west tower which bears strong resemblance to a castle turret, the west tower was possibly built during the reign of Henry III (1216–1272) to serve a defensive as well as religious role, and is Rugby's oldest building. The church has other artefacts of medieval Rugby including the 13th-century parish chest, and a medieval font. The church was extensively re-built and expanded in the 19th century, designed by William Butterfield. The expanded church included a new east tower, added in 1895 which has a spire 182 feet (55 m) high. The church is grade II* listed. Very unusually, both of the church towers have ringable bells, the main peal of bells (all cast in 1896 by Mears & Stainbank, London) being located in the eastern tower, and the old peal (all cast in 1711 by Joseph Smith of Edgbaston) located in the western tower.

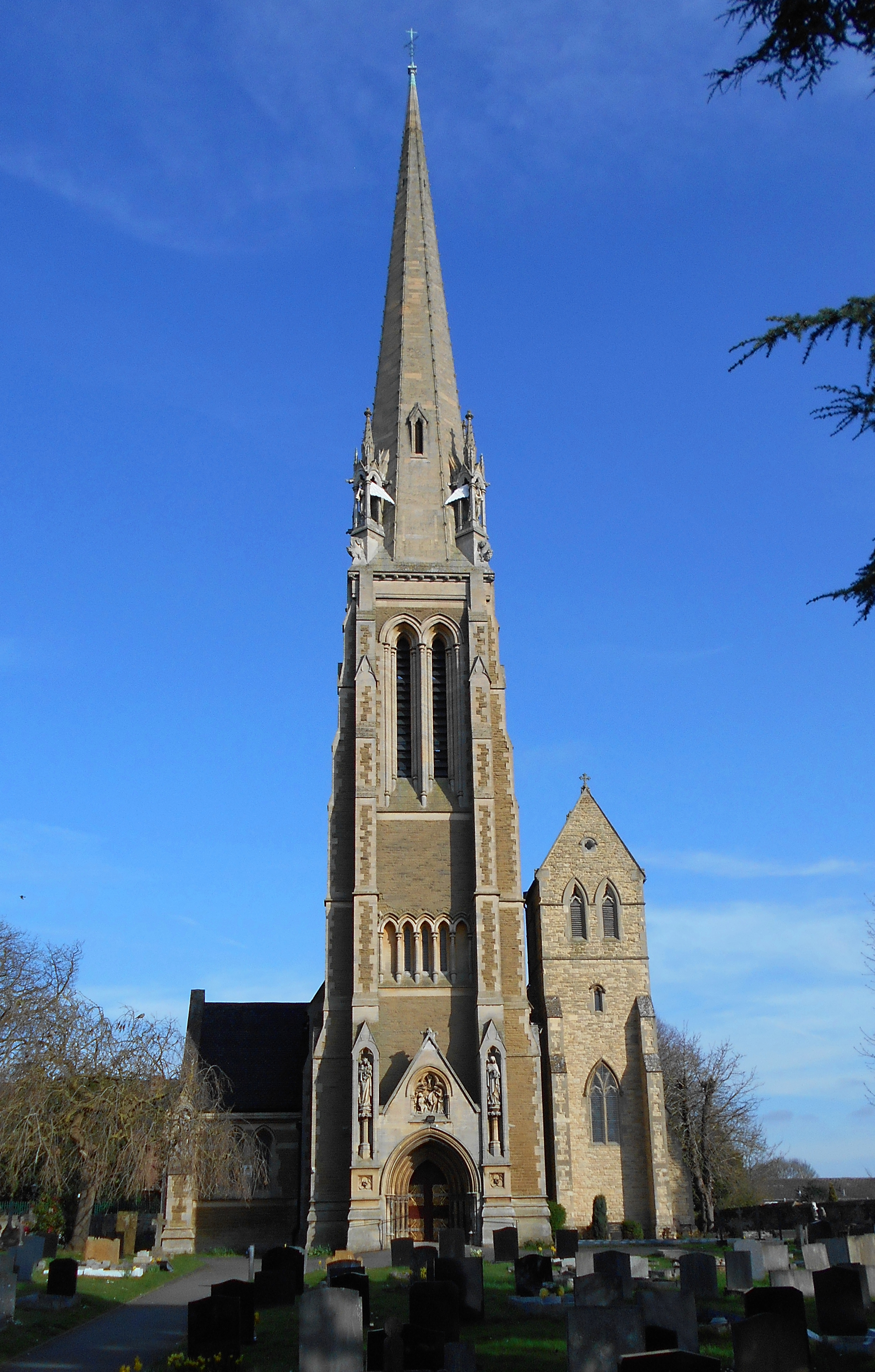
St Marie's Church

St Marie's Church on Dunchurch Road, is Rugby's main Roman Catholic church. It is one of the town's most well-known landmarks as it is quite dominant on the skyline. The church was first opened in 1847, designed by Pugin in the Gothic revival style, it was enlarged in 1864, and in 1872 the current tall and slender spire was added, which is nearly 200 feet (61 metres) tall. The church is also grade II* listed.

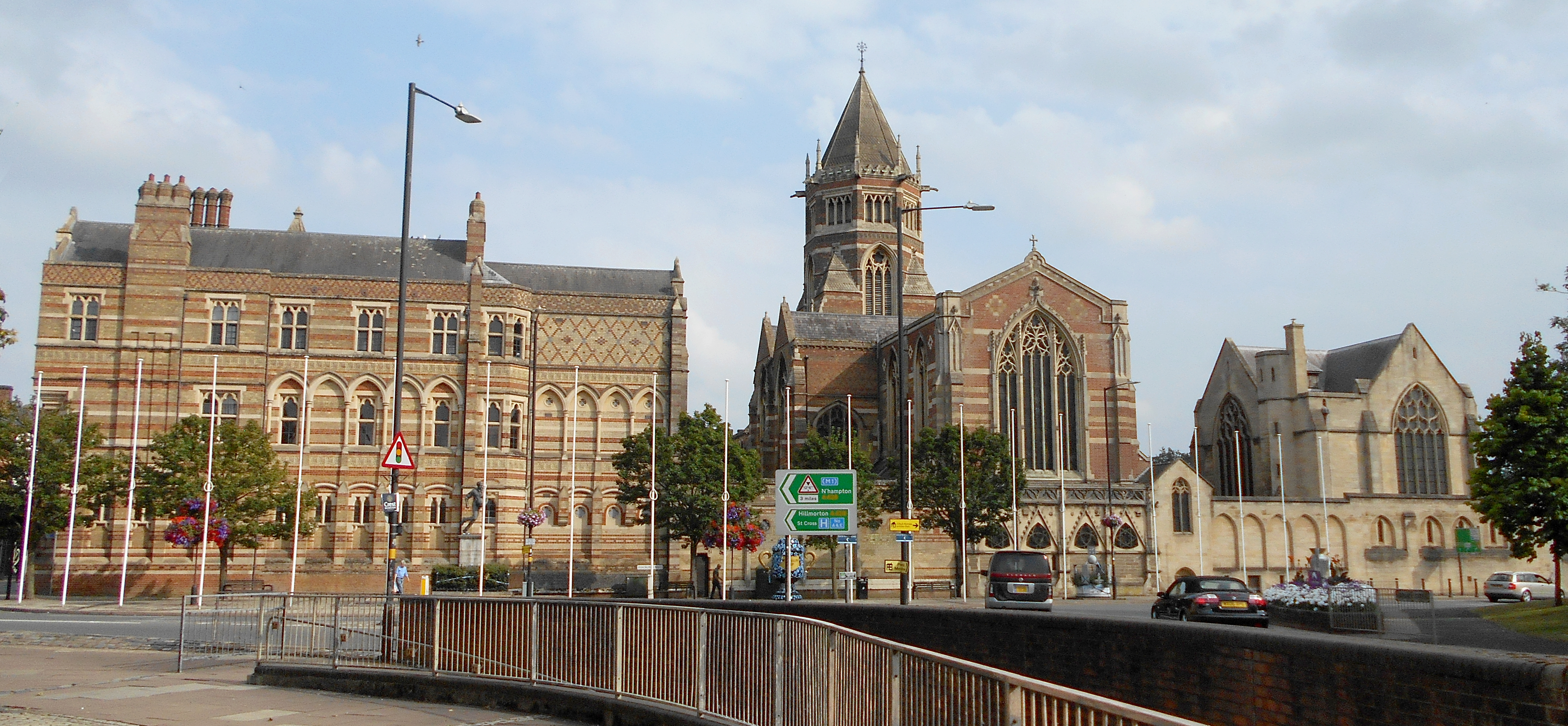
Rugby School, (from left to right) New Quad Buildings, Chapel and War Memorial Chapel.

The buildings of Rugby School are major landmarks mostly dating from the 18th and 19th century with some early 20th Century additions. The oldest buildings are the Old Quad Buildings and the School House the oldest parts of which date from 1748, but were mostly built between 1809 and 1813 by Henry Hakewill, these are grade II* listed. Most of the current landmark buildings date from the Victorian era and were designed by William Butterfield: The most notable of these is the chapel, dating from 1872, which is topped by an octagonal tower 138 feet (42 m) tall, and is grade I listed. Butterfield's New Quad buildings are grade II* listed and date from 1867 to 1885. The War Memorial chapel designed by Charles Nicholson is a later addition dating from 1922.

There are two further grade I listed buildings in Rugby, although these are not in the town centre, one of these is St Botolph's Church in Newbold-on-Avon, the second is Bilton Hall in Bilton.

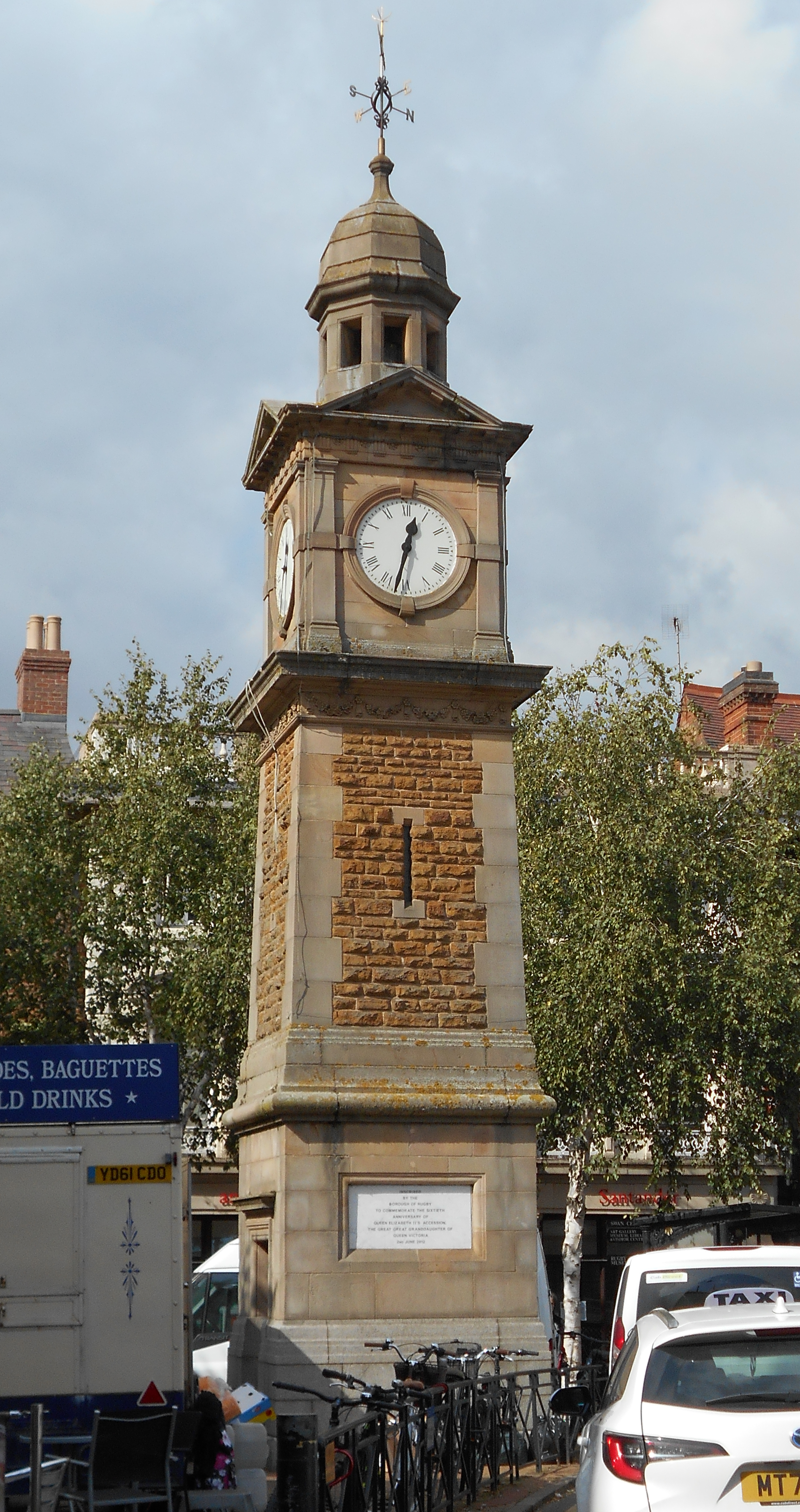
Jubilee Clock Tower

Rugby's Jubilee Clock Tower in Market Place is one of the town's best known landmarks, which traditionally marks the centre of Rugby. The clock tower dates from 1887, and was built to celebrate Queen Victoria's jubilee. It is 43 feet (13 m) tall, built of Derby Dale stone, and was designed by Goodacres of Leicester. The clocks were donated by Evans and Sons of Birmingham. It is grade II listed.

=== Places of interest ===
Places of interest in the town include:

- The Rugby School Museum, which has audio-visual displays about the history of Rugby School and of the town.
- The combined Rugby Art Gallery and Museum. The art gallery contains a nationally recognised collection of contemporary art. The museum contains, amongst other things, Roman artefacts dug up from the nearby Roman settlement of Tripontium.
- The Webb Ellis Rugby Football Museum, where traditional rugby balls are handmade. It contains much rugby football memorabilia.
- The Benn Hall, a conference, seminar, exhibition and party venue.
- Newbold Quarry Park, nature reserve
- Swift Valley Nature Reserve
- Rainsbrook Valley Railway, miniature railway

Places of interest around Rugby include:

- Brandon Marsh
- Brinklow Castle
- Coombe Abbey
- Dunchurch – Historic village
- Draycote Water – Reservoir and nature reserve
- Garden Organic
- Oxford Canal
- Stanford Hall

== Transport ==
=== Railways ===
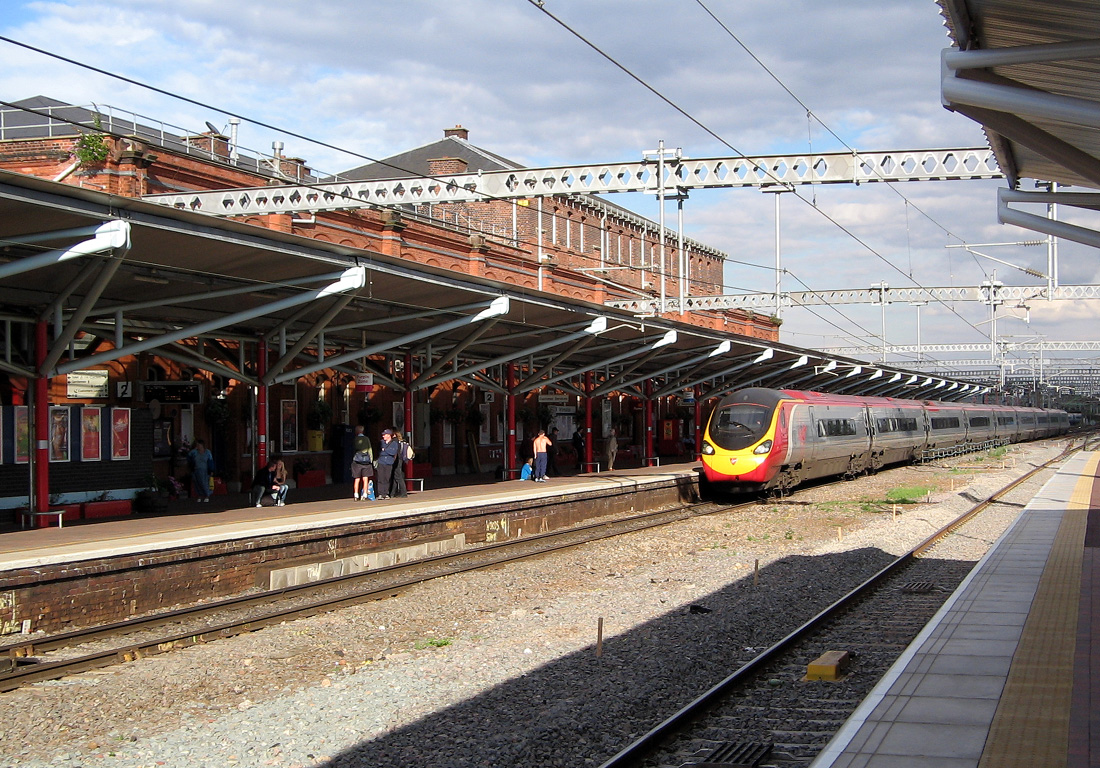
Rugby railway station

Rugby railway station is a principal stop on the West Coast Main Line, with frequent regular services to London Euston, Birmingham New Street, Stafford, Crewe and Northampton. There are also some infrequent services to Glasgow Central, the North West of England, Shrewsbury, Chester and Holyhead. Routes are operated by West Midlands Trains and Avanti West Coast.

Rugby has had a railway station since 1838, when the London and Birmingham Railway was opened, though the present station dates from 1885. It was once served by lines which have now been closed, including to Leicester, Leamington Spa and Peterborough; these were closed in the 1960s as part of the Beeching cuts.

Between 1899 and 1969, Rugby had a second station; Rugby Central station was a stop on the former Great Central Main Line, which hosted services to London Marylebone to the south and Leicester, Nottingham and Sheffield to the north. The station and line were closed in the 1960s as part of the Beeching cuts.

British Railways' locomotive testing centre was located in Rugby.

Warwickshire County Council have proposed a new station in the area; Rugby Parkway station is to be sited on the Northampton Loop Line, south-east of the existing station; it will serve the Hillmorton area of the town and the new development at Houlton. The station is to be built in between the current edge of town and DIRFT to accommodate for the future expansion of the town where 6,200 homes are planned to be built over a 15 to 20-year period. No date, however, has been given for the opening of this station.

=== Roads ===
Rugby is situated near to several major trunk routes including the M1, M6 and M45 motorways, and the A5, A14 and A45 roads. Other main roads in the town include the A426 road, the A428 road and the Rugby Western Relief Road, which links the A45 with the Leicester Road, that connects with junction 1 of the M6.

In 2010, a short local bypass was opened; it was the first part of the Rugby Western Relief Road. It runs from the A428 (Lawford Road), along the edge of the built-up area to the A4071 (road from Rugby through Bilton and Cawston), a little west of Cawston; it takes through heavy traffic off suburban housing roads such as Addison Road. On 10 September 2010, the final part of Rugby's Western Relief Road was opened. The road runs from Potsford Dam near Cawston, through the Lawford Road and ending at Newbold Road, near the Avon Valley School. The initial estimated cost was projected at £36.6 million, while the final figure was in excess of £60 million.

=== Buses ===
Stagecoach in Warwickshire is the town's primary operator, with routes to Coventry, Southam, Leamington Spa, Daventry, Leicester and Northampton; it also serves the major estates of the town.

=== Air ===
There are direct railway links to Birmingham Airport, via Birmingham International railway station; smaller nearby Coventry Airport closed in 2026.

=== Canal ===
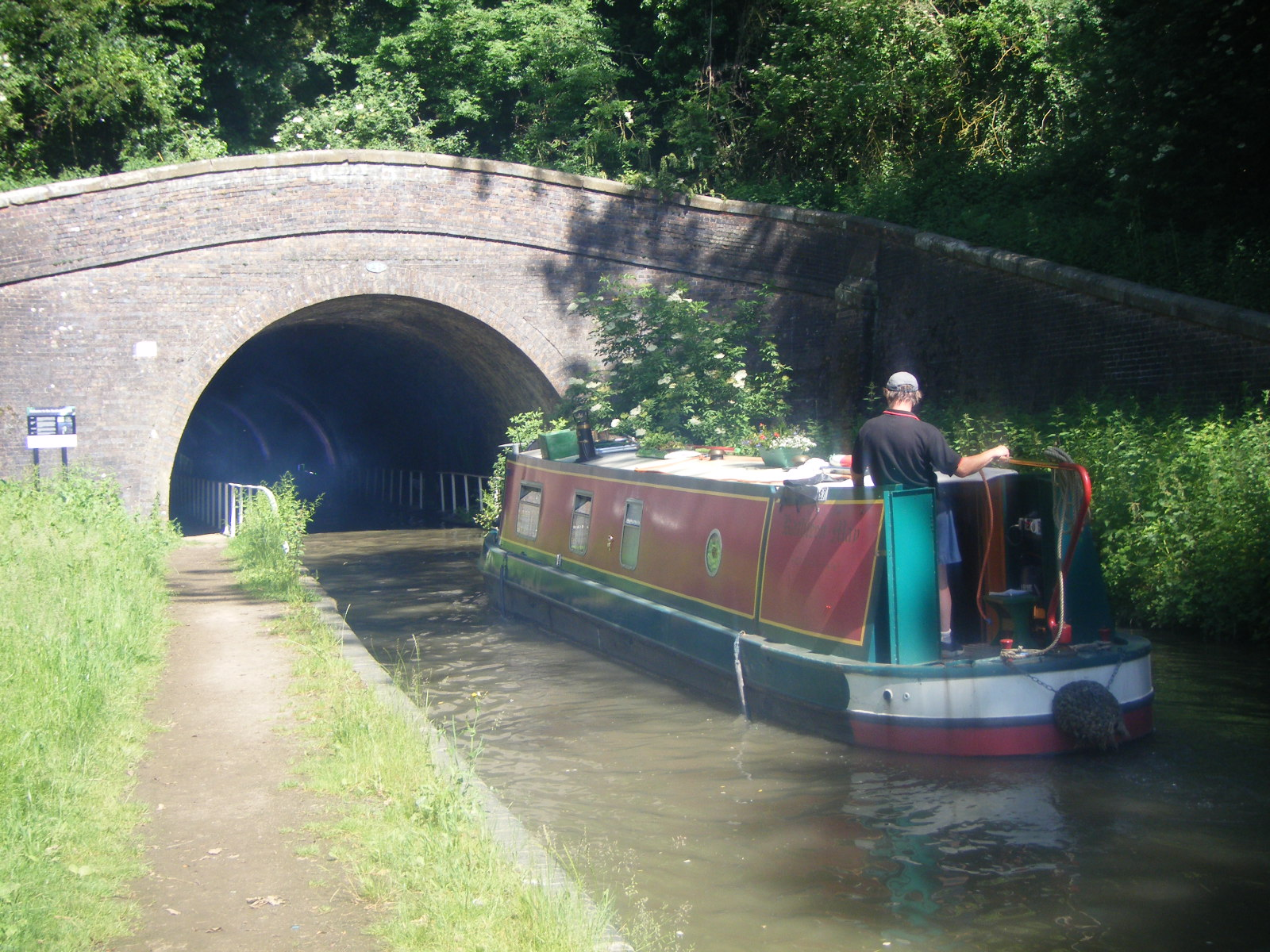
Newbold canal tunnel on the Oxford Canal at Rugby

The Oxford Canal, which runs from near Coventry to Oxford, passes around Rugby and through the areas of Newbold, Brownsover and Hillmorton. The canal was opened in 1790, as a winding contour canal, but was straightened out in the 1830s. Notable features of the canal locally are the 250 yd (230 m) long tunnel at Newbold and the flight of locks at Hillmorton, which are the busiest flight of locks on the national canal network.

=== Cycling ===
There are a number of cycling routes in Rugby, including roadside cycle lanes; others are off-road and traffic free, some of which reuse old railway infrastructure.

== Notable residents ==
=== Born in Rugby ===
- Chris Adams (1955–2001), wrestler
- Neil Adams (born 1958), judoka
- Junade Ali (born 1996), computer scientist, youngest ever fellow of a professional engineering institution on record and inventor of Compromised Credential Checking amongst other technologies
- Melanie Astles, (born 1982) French aerobatic champion
- David Barby (1943–2012), antiques expert
- Ian Bell (born 1982), cricketer
- Laura Bettinson (born 1987), singer-songwriter
- Andrew Bloxam (1801–1878), clergyman and naturalist
- Matthew Bloxam (1805–1888), antiquarian and archaeologist
- Arthur Bostrom (born 1955), actor, best known for his role as Officer Crabtree in the BBC TV sitcom 'Allo 'Allo!
- Rupert Brooke (1887–1915), poet
- Karl Burke (born 1963), racehorse trainer
- Richard Cockerill (born 1970), rugby union coach and former player
- Ben "Yahtzee" Croshaw (born 1983), comedic writer
- Jim Dewes (born 1957), cricketer
- Maud Russell England (1863–1956), New Zealand teacher, feminist, educationalist and art dealer
- Walter Gilbert (1871–1946), sculptor
- Herbert Haddock (1861–1946), ship captain, the first person to captain Titanic
- Michael John Harrison (born 1945), writer
- Ali James (born 1979), rugby player
- Peter Kember (born 1965), musician (Spacemen 3, Spectrum)
- Jeremy R. Knowles (1935–2007), organic chemist and enzymologist at Oxford and Harvard
- Richard Lindon (1816–1887), leatherworker, inventor
- Norman Lockyer (1836–1920), scientist, discovered the gas helium
- Rose Macaulay (1881–1958), writer
- Ray Mawby (1922–1990) – Conservative politician and Member of Parliament – later revealed to have been a spy for Communist Czechoslovakia.
- Katharine Merry (born 1974), former sprinter
- James Morrison (born 1984), singer-songwriter
- James Petiver (1665–1718), botanist
- Jason Pierce (born 1965), musician (Spiritualized, Spacemen 3)
- Tim Pigott-Smith (1946–2017), actor
- Marjorie Pollard (1899–1982), field hockey and cricket player, film maker and writer, and the first woman to commentate on sport for the BBC
- Carole Quinton (born 1936) former track and field athlete
- Peter Rogers (1947–2020), businessman
- Sam Ruddock (born 1990), track and field athlete
- Lawrence Sheriff (c. 1510–1567), grocer, philanthropist
- Barbara Stocking (born 1951), public servant
- Vikki Stone, (born 1985), comedienne
- Lauren Taylor (born 1994), golfer
- Chris Wakelin (born 1992), snooker player
- Peter Whalley (1722–1791), clergyman, academic and schoolmaster
- Mona Wilson (1872–1954), civil servant and author
- Arnold Wolfendale (1927–2020), Astronomer Royal
- Kimberley Woods (born 1995), Canoeist
- Albert Wratislaw (1822–1892), clergyman and scholar
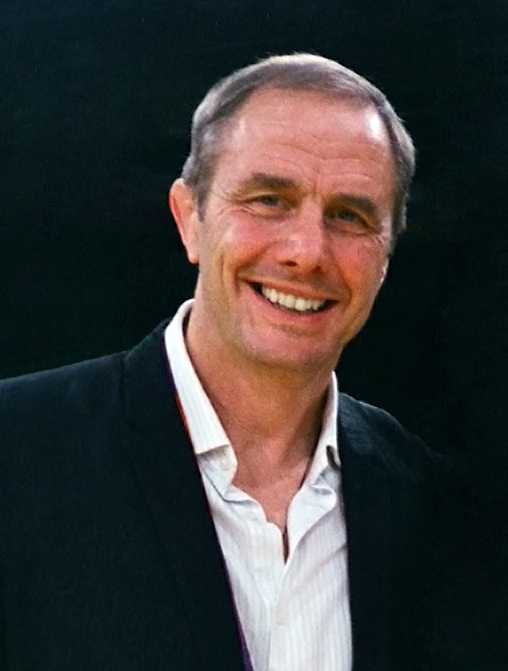
Neil Adams, Judoka, multiple Olympic medal winner

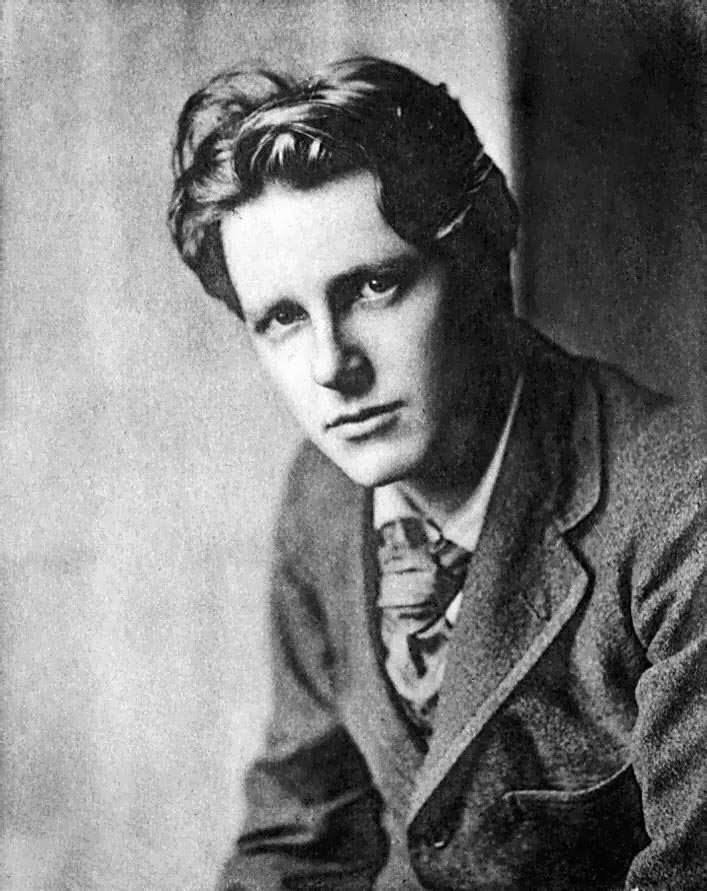
Rupert Brooke, poet

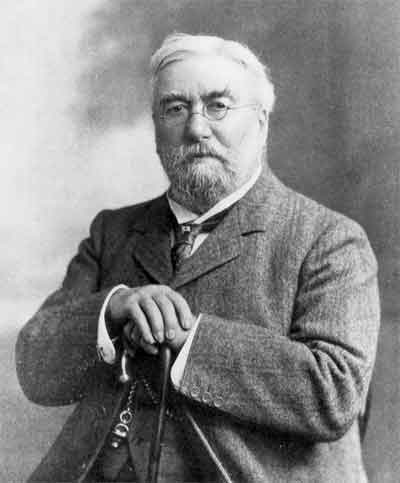
Norman Lockyer, scientist, discovered helium

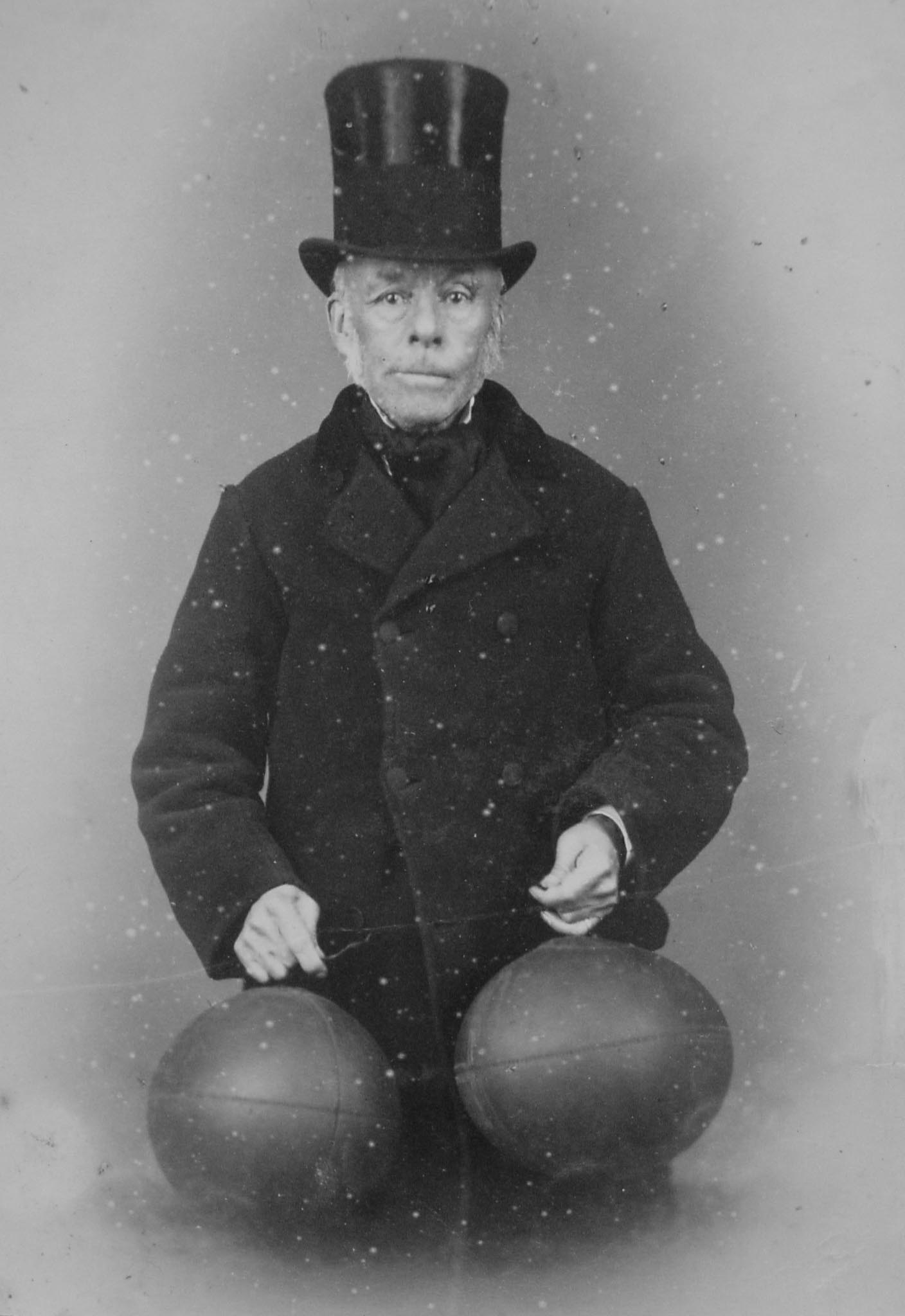
Richard Lindon, leatherworker, inventor of rugby ball

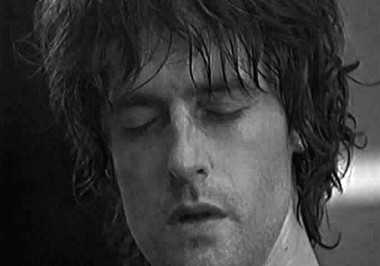
Jason Pierce, musician, (Spacemen 3, Spiritualized)

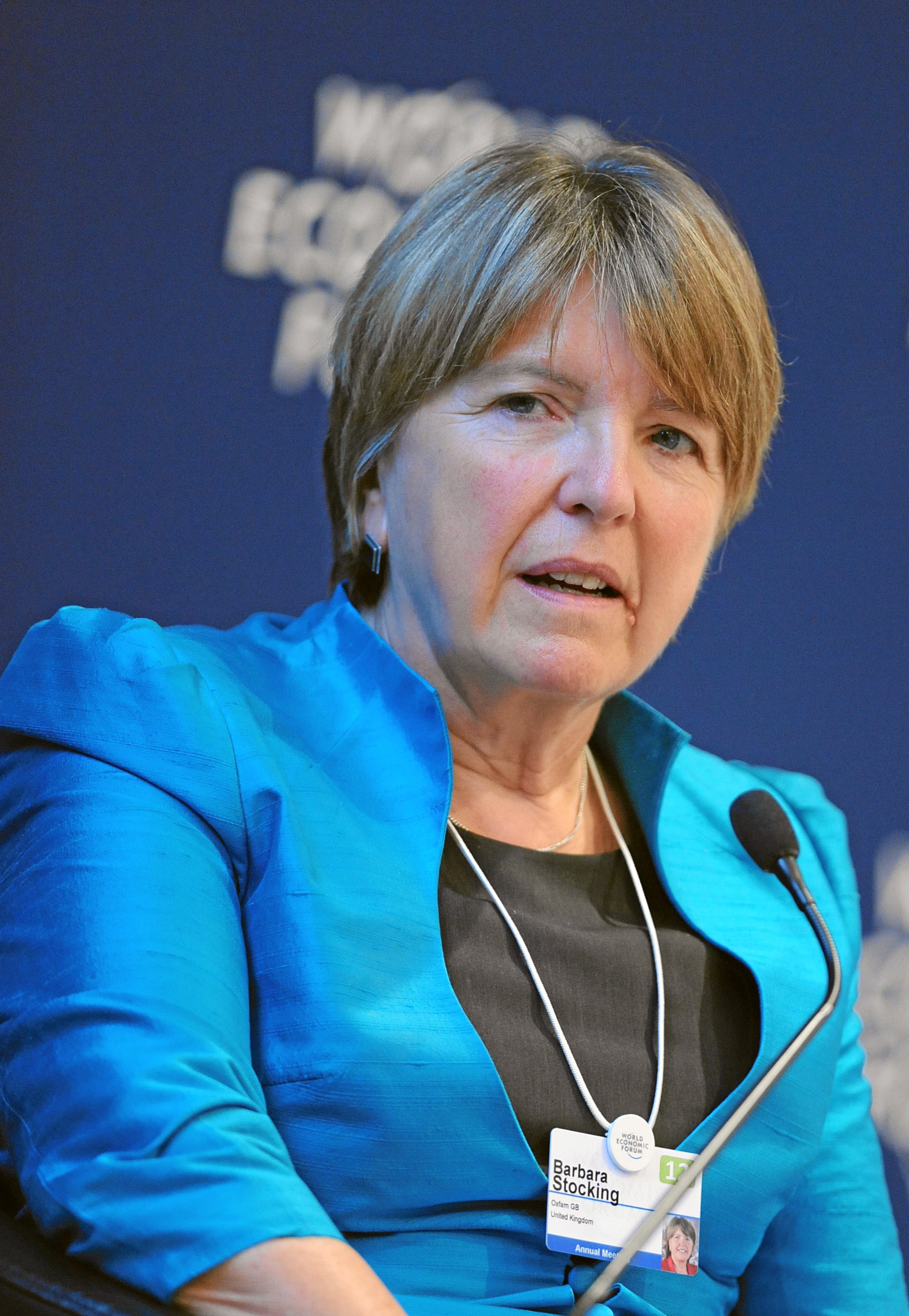
Barbara Stocking, former head of Oxfam GB

=== Lived or lives in Rugby ===
- Joseph Addison (1672–1719), writer and politician
- Matthew Arnold (1822–1888), poet
- Thomas Arnold (1795–1842), educator
- Emily Burns (born 1994), singer-songwriter
- Lewis Carroll (1832–1898), writer
- Will Carruthers (born 1967), musician
- Neville Chamberlain (1869–1940), politician
- Paul Dirac (1902–1984), physicist
- William Webb Ellis (1806–1872), clergyman, claimed inventor of rugby football
- Reginald Foort (1893–1980), organist
- Dennis Gabor (1900–1979), physicist
- William Gilbert (1799–1877) established Gilbert company sports equipment manufacturer.
- Thomas Hughes (1822–1896), writer
- Billy J. Kramer (born 1943), singer
- Unity Mitford (1914–1948), socialite
- John Moultrie (1799–1874), clergyman and poet
- Kevin Painter (born 1967), darts player
- Louise Porton (born 1996), double murderer who killed her own two children in Rugby in January 2018
- Peter Purves (born 1939), television presenter
- Yvonne Ruddock (1965–1981), victim of the New Cross house fire in London.
- Salman Rushdie (born 1947), novelist
- Judy Simpson (born 1960), athlete
- Lesley Souter (1917–1981) first female electrical engineering student at the University of Glasgow
- Franco Wanyama (1968–2019), boxer
- Frank Whittle (1907–1996), inventor
- Clem Wilson (1875–1944), cricketer
- Johnny Williams (1926–2007), boxer, one time both the British and Empire heavyweight champion
- Richard Henry Wood (1820–1908), antiquary and philanthropist

== Education ==
=== Primary ===
State schools

- Abbots Farm Junior School
- Abbots Farm Infant School
- Bawnmore Infant School
- Bilton Infant School
- Bilton CE Junior School
- Boughton Leigh Infant
- Boughton Leigh Junior
- Brownsover Community Infant School
- Cawston Grange Primary School
- Clifton-upon-Dunsmore Primary School
- Eastlands Primary School
- English Martyrs Catholic Primary School
- Henry Hinde Infant School
- Henry Hinde Junior School
- Hillmorton Primary School
- Long Lawford Primary School
- Northlands Primary School
- Oakfield Primary Academy
- Paddox Primary School
- Riverside Academy
- Rokeby Infant School
- Rokeby Junior School
- Rugby Free Primary School
- St Andrew's Benn CE Primary School
- St Gabriels's CofE Academy
- St Maries RC Infant School
- St Maries RC Junior School
- St Matthews Bloxham CE Primary School

Independent

- Crescent School

=== Secondary ===
Comprehensive Schools

- Avon Valley School
- Bilton School
- Harris Church of England Academy
- Houlton School
- Rugby Free Secondary School

Partially selective schools

- Ashlawn School

Grammar schools

- Lawrence Sheriff School
- Rugby High School for Girls

Independent schools

- Rugby School
- Bilton Grange

=== Further education ===
- Rugby College – which is a part of the Warwickshire College Group.
- Percival Guildhouse – Independent adult education charity.

=== Former schools and colleges ===
- Bishop Wulstan School
- Hillbrow School
- William Temple College (1954–71): an Anglican theological college.

== Local media ==
Local radio stations include BBC CWR, Hits Radio Coventry & Warwickshire (formerly known as Free Radio Coventry and Warwickshire) and Capital Mid-Counties.

The main local newspapers are the Rugby Advertiser, Rugby Observer, and Warwickshire Telegraph which is a localised sub-edition of the Coventry Telegraph.

The Rugby area is covered on regional TV News by BBC Midlands Today and ITV News Central.

== Twin towns ==
Rugby is twinned with:

- Évreux, France (since 1959)
- Rüsselsheim, Germany (since 1977)

== See also ==
- Rugby, North Dakota
- Rugby, Tennessee
- Rugby, New South Wales, Australia
