= Ali James =

English rugby union player

- Born: Ali James; 11 October 1979 (age 47) Rugby, Warwickshire, England
- Height: 5 ft 11 in (1.80 m)
- Weight: 13 st 8 lb (86 kg)
- University: University of Oxford

Rugby union career
- Position: Centre
- Current team: Wasps RFC
Youth career
- Gloucester Academy
Senior career
Years	Team	Apps	(Points)
- Newbury
2007 -	Gloucester Rugby	1	(0)
2007 -	Moseley (loan)		

Ali James (born 11 October 1979 in Rugby, Warwickshire) is a sports physiotherapist and former English rugby union footballer.

== Background ==
James was the son of a professional boxer, and began playing rugby at age 13. A product of the Gloucester Rugby Academy, he moved to Newbury before rejoining Gloucester Rugby in the summer of 2007. He played as a centre. During the 2007/08 season he played for Moseley as a loan player.

James played professionally while at university for physiotherapy, first studying at the University of the West of England, and later completing a master's degree at Oxford University. While at Oxford, he played centre for the university squad.

In 2012 he joined Wasps as a physiotherapist. Later, he became head of Medical services for the team. During the COVID-19 pandemic, James was credited with using temperature sensing to monitor player's health.
