= Edward Boughton =

Edward Boughton may refer to:

- Edward Boughton (MP), in 1584, MP for Coventry (UK Parliament constituency)
- Sir Edward Boughton, 2nd Baronet (1628–1680) of the Boughton Baronets
- Sir Edward Boughton, 5th Baronet (1689–1722) of the Boughton Baronets
- Sir Edward Boughton, 6th Baronet (1719–1772) of the Boughton Baronets
- Sir Edward Boughton, 8th Baronet (1742–1794) of the Boughton Baronets
- Sir Edward Hotham Rouse Boughton, 5th and 13th Baronet (1893–1963) of the Boughton Baronets

== See also ==
- Boughton (surname)
