= William Boughton (disambiguation) =

William Boughton is an English conductor.

William Boughton may also refer to:

- William Boughton (cricketer) (1854–1936), English cricketer
- William Boughton (MP) for Worcester
- Sir William Boughton, 1st Baronet (1600–1656) of the Boughton baronets
- Sir William Boughton, 3rd Baronet (1632–1683) of the Boughton baronets
- Sir William Boughton, 4th Baronet (1663–1716) of the Boughton baronets
- Sir William Edward Rouse Boughton 2nd and 10th Baronet (1788–1856) of the Boughton baronets
- Sir William St Andrew Rouse Boughton, 4th and 12th Baronet (1853–1937) of the Boughton baronets

== See also ==
- William Rouse-Boughton (1788–1856), British politician
- Boughton (disambiguation)
