= St Botolph's Church, Newbold-on-Avon =

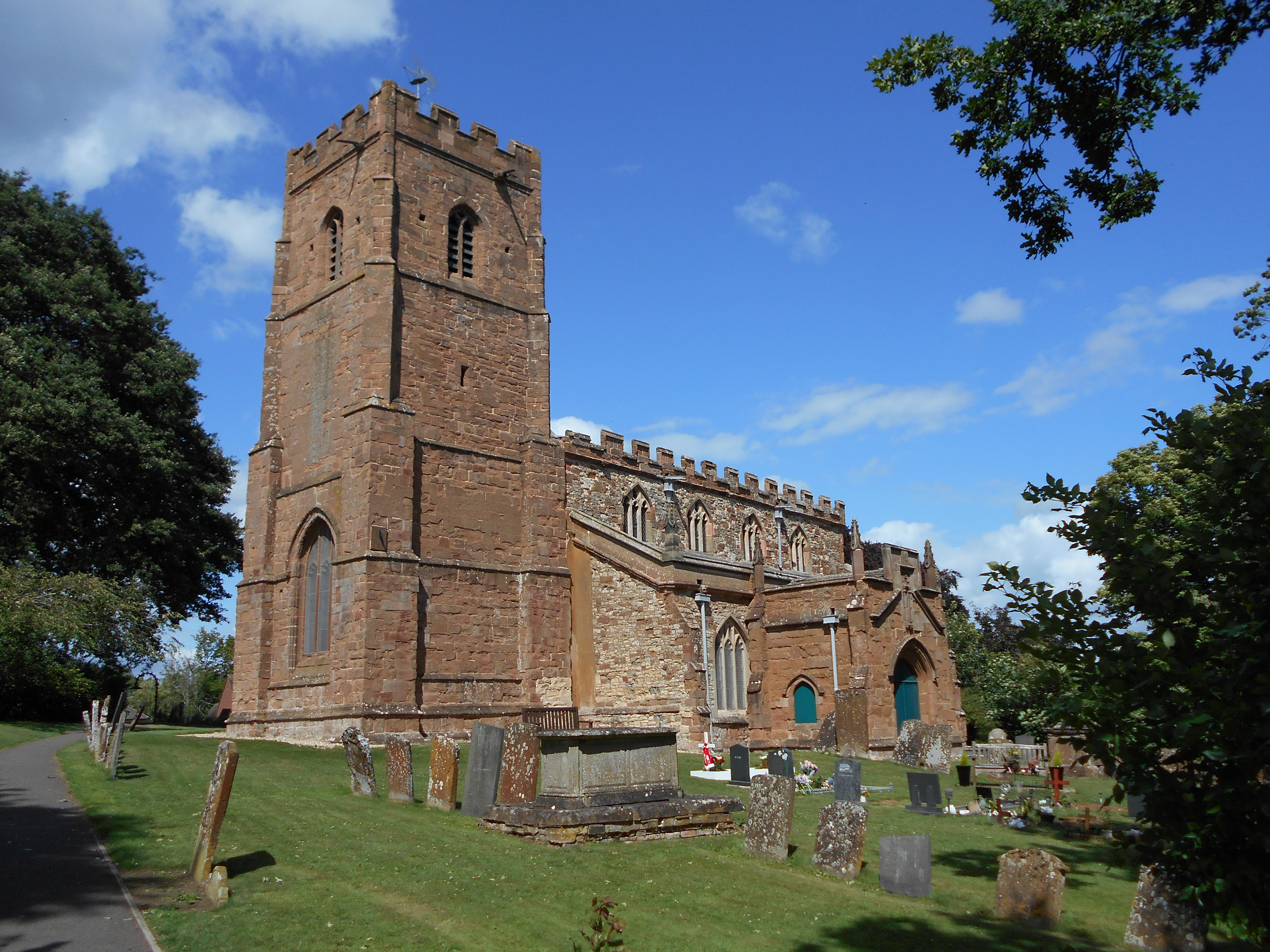
- St Botolph's Church, Newbold-on-Avon
- 52.389841°N 1.286200°W
- OS grid reference: SP 48674 77111
- Location: Main Street, Newbold-on-Avon, Rugby, Warwickshire
- Country: England
- Denomination: Church of England
- Website: www.stbotolphstjohn.org.uk

History
- Status: Active

Architecture
- Functional status: Parish church
- Years built: Mostly 15th century

Administration
- Province: Canterbury
- Diocese: Coventry
- Parish: Newbold-on-Avon with Long Lawford

Listed Building – Grade I
- Official name: Church of St Botolph
- Designated: 11 October 1949
- Reference no.: 1183970

The Church of St Botolph is a grade I listed 15th century parish church in Newbold-on-Avon, Rugby, Warwickshire, England. The church is located on an elevated position overlooking the River Avon.

== History and architecture ==
A church was recorded at the site in the 12th century, however the current church is built on the site of this, and mostly dates from the 15th century, with portions of the older church incorporated into the building. These include the lower portion of the tower, and a section of 14th century tiled floor. The church is predominantly made from pink sandstone. The chancel was rebuilt in the 19th century.

The interior of the church is known for its elaborate array of funerary monuments, mostly of members the Boughton family, who for centuries resided at nearby Lawford Hall, in Little Lawford, the earliest of the monuments dating from 1454.

== Today ==
The church still serves as the parish church for the parish of Newbold-on-Avon with Long Lawford.
