= Sir Theodosius Boughton, 7th Baronet =

British aristocrat (1760-1780)

Sir Theodosius Edward Allesley Boughton (August 1760 – 29 August 1780) was a British aristocrat who was the 7th Boughton baronet of Lawford. Boughton was poisoned by his brother-in-law in what became a famous murder case in the United Kingdom.

== Life ==
Boughton attended Rugby School from the age of seven, which was four miles from his home. In 1772 when he was 12, his father Edward Boughton died suddenly at the age of 53, meaning Theodosius would inherit his estate when he reached the age of 21 (which he never did). In 1775, at age 15 he was sent away to Eton College in Berkshire, where by 1777 he had contracted venereal disease (likely syphilis) which left him in a poor state of health, soon afterwards he was brought home by his mother.

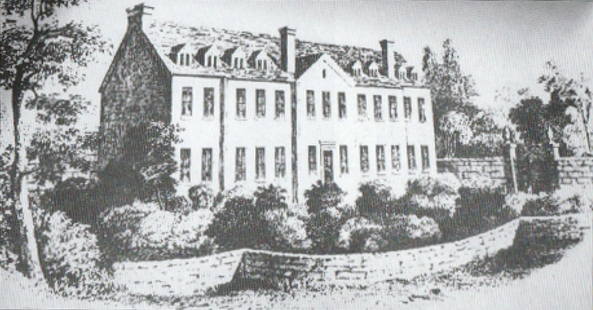
Engraving of the former Lawford Hall, demolished c 1790

In 1780, Boughton was living at his ancestral family home of Lawford Hall, Little Lawford, near Rugby with his mother Lady Anne Maria Boughton, older sister Theodosia, and brother-in-law, Captain John Donellan. Donellan (born 1737) was known as "Diamond" Donellan because of a large diamond he had brought back to England from India.

== Death ==
Boughton was under the care of Mr Powell, a local apothecary based in Rugby, for his poor health. Powell, had made up a purgative draught for Boughton, which consisted of fifteen grains each of jalap and rhubarb, and twenty drops of lavender water, mixed with two drams each of syrup and nutmeg water, and an ounce and a half of plain water. The draught was delivered to Lawford Hall by a servant on 29 August 1780, and the servant insisted that it had been delivered to Theodosius directly.

Later that night, while he had just turned 20, his mother stood by his bed and insisted that he drink the draught that the apothecary had prepared; he said it tasted bad, but drank it anyway with a piece of cheese. Within minutes of drinking it Boughton started heaving and groaning, and frothing at the mouth, and died soon afterwards.

Following his funeral, his remains were buried at St Botolph's Church at nearby Newbold-on-Avon.

=== Aftermath ===
After Boughton's funeral, suspicions arose as to the cause of his death, and suspicion soon fell on Donellan who would stand to gain if Theodosius died before 21, as the estate would go to his sister. The body was exhumed and examined. A Coroner's inquest ruled that Boughton's cause of death was poisoning and returned a verdict of murder against Donellan. Despite the preponderance of circumstantial evidence, and Donellan's claims of innocence, he was convicted, condemned and executed on 2 April 1781.

Boughton's widowed sister subsequently married Sir Egerton Leigh Bt, 2nd Baronet (1762-1818).

The title was inherited by a half cousin, (grandson of the 4th Baronet by his second wife Catherine), Sir Edward Boughton, 8th Baronet, who sold Lawford Hall (later demolished) and the Warwickshire estate in 1793.

Baronetage of England
Preceded by Edward Boughton	Baronet (of Lawford); 1772–1780	Succeeded by Edward Boughton
