= Long Lawford =

Village in Warwickshire, England

Coordinates: 52.379465°N 1.302760°W

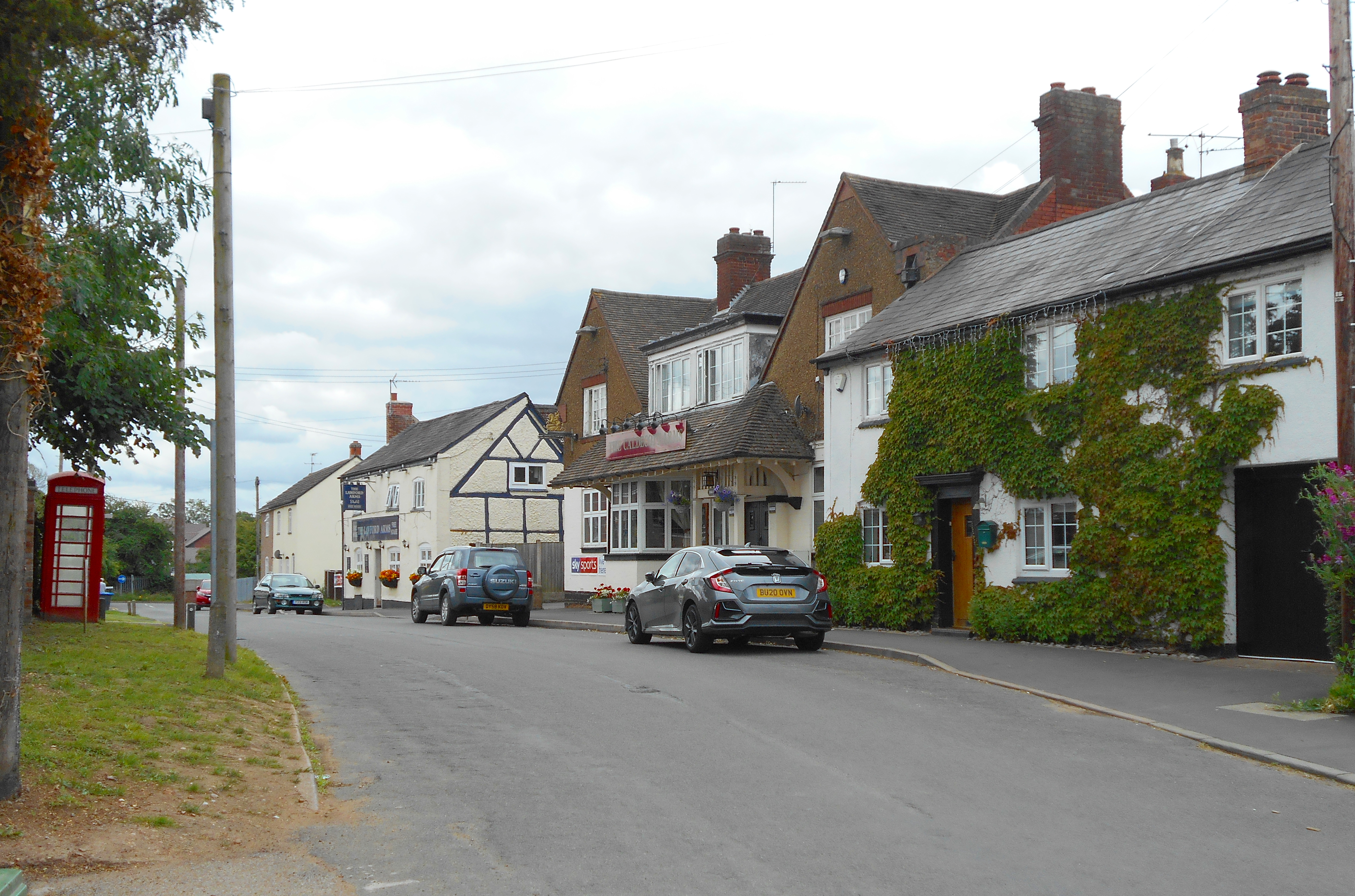
- Main Street, Long Lawford

- Location within Warwickshire
- Population: 4,545 (2021 census)
- OS grid reference: SP 472 755
- Civil parish: Long Lawford
- District: Rugby
- Shire county: Warwickshire
- Region: West Midlands
- Country: England
- Sovereign state: United Kingdom
- Post town: RUGBY
- Postcode district: CV23
- Dialling code: 01788
- Police: Warwickshire
- Fire: Warwickshire
- Ambulance: West Midlands
- UK Parliament: Rugby

Long Lawford is a village and civil parish in the Rugby borough of Warwickshire, England, located just west of Rugby, around 1.75 miles (2.82 km) west of Rugby town centre. In the 2021 census, the population of the parish was 4,545, a significant increase from 3,180 at the 2011 census, and 2,863 in 2001.

== Geography ==
The village is situated on a ridge overlooking the valley of the River Avon to the north. It is one of four Lawfords in the locality, and is named long because, historically, the village ran along the road between Rugby and Coventry. The other three Lawfords are Church Lawford, to the west, Little Lawford to the north, and Lawford Heath to the south (which is within the parish).

The village sits just north of the A428 road between Rugby and Coventry. The Rugby to Coventry railway line runs through the village, but it has never had its own station. Immediately to the east of the village is the large Cemex (former Rugby Cement) works and its associated quarry.

== History ==
Recent archaeological excavations have found evidence that Long Lawford has been used as a settlement for 2000 years. Excavations of a Celtic Iron Age Village uncovered an Iron Age sword.

The village was mentioned in the Domesday Book referred to as Lelleford (the ford by the elders). By 1332 the name was recorded as Longa Lalleford. Long Lawford and Little Lawford were anciently within the parish of Newbold-on-Avon, but both became separate civil parishes in the 19th century.

The monks of Pipewell Abbey were the lords of the manor for over 400 years from 1160, until the monasteries were dissolved, and then their lands here were granted to Edward Boughton in 1542. The Rouse-Boughton family established themselves at nearby Lawford Hall, and dominated the life of the village, until Sir Theodosius Boughton, the last male heir of the Boughtons was allegedly murdered there by his brother-in-law in 1780, after which Lawford Hall was demolished.

Their lands were then sold to the Caldecott family in 1793, who built a new manor house at Holbrook Grange closer to Long Lawford on the opposite side of the Avon in 1803. Although the house has now changed hands, the influences of the Caldecotts remain, with one of the two village public houses being "The Caldecott Arms".

The village underwent considerable expansion in the 1960s with the construction of a large housing estate to the east of the old village, which turned the village into an effective suburb of Rugby. The village was further expanded with another housing development called Avon Pastures in the 2000s, just off the A428 road. The primary road in this development, 'Tee Tong Road', was named by a Malaysian bidder, who made the highest bid in a Children in Need auction in 2005.

== Amenities ==
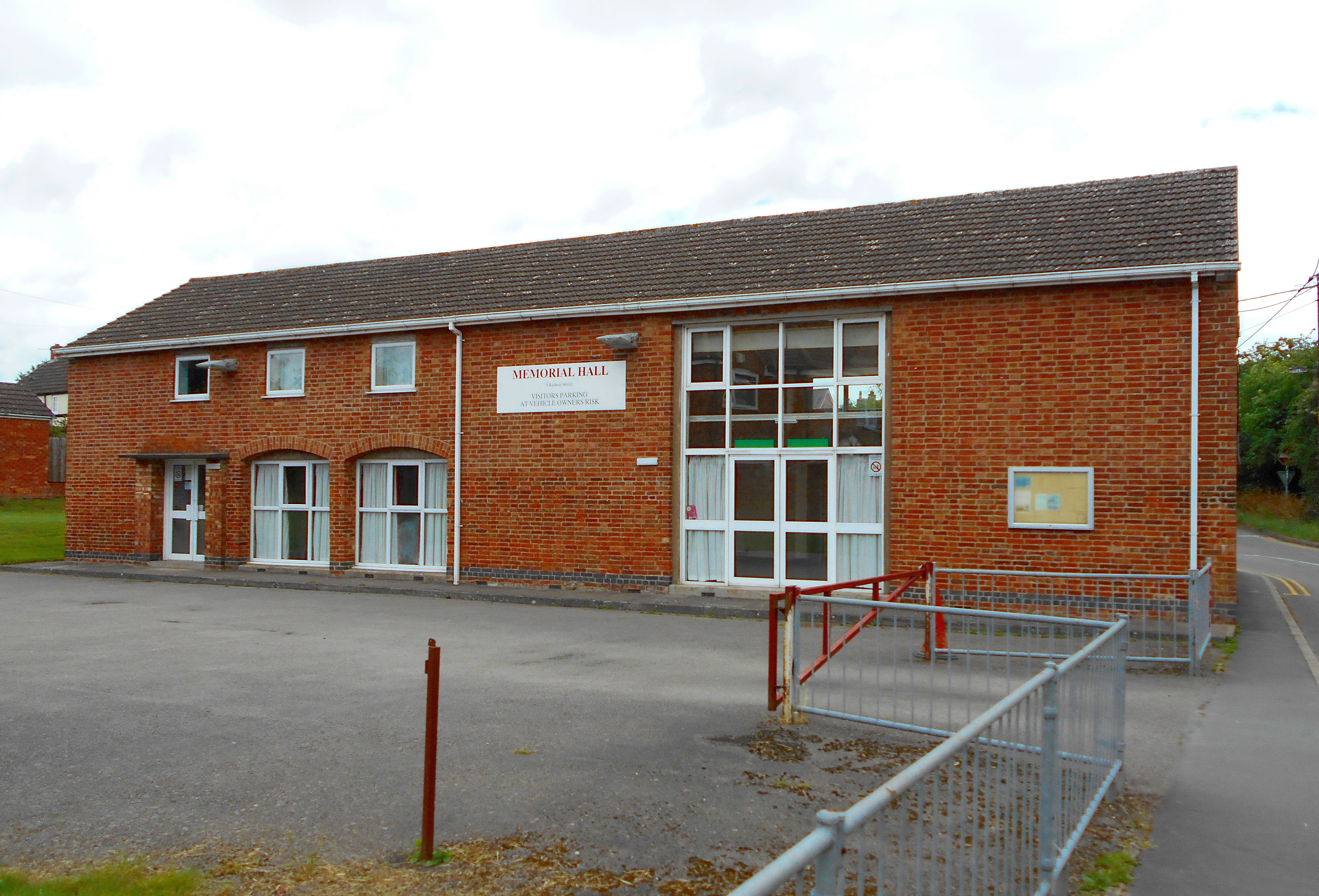
Long Lawford Memorial Hall

Long Lawford has a primary school, and a playing field called King George's Field with a skate park which opened in 2013. It also has a Co-Op Food store situated on Townsend Lane. The two village pubs are the "Lawford Arms" and the "Caldecott Arms" both on Main Street. The village hall and main community centre is the Memorial Hall on Railway Street, which was converted from a former barn in 1959, and was named in honour of the fallen servicemen of Long Lawford.

In November 2022, Cornerstone Community Church was established within the village. the church meets at the Memorial Hall each Sunday morning. There are also two other Churches in the village, Long Lawford Lighthouse and St John.

== Parish Council ==
Long Lawford is governed by Long Lawford Parish Council, which consists of currently four councillors. They meet monthly at the Memorial Hall on Railway Street, on the second Tuesday of every month at 7.30pm. The public and press are allowed to attend these monthly meeting to ask question or watch discussions and proceedings of the Long Lawford Parish Council. All the agendas and minutes are published digitally on their website for all members of the public.

== Notable buildings ==
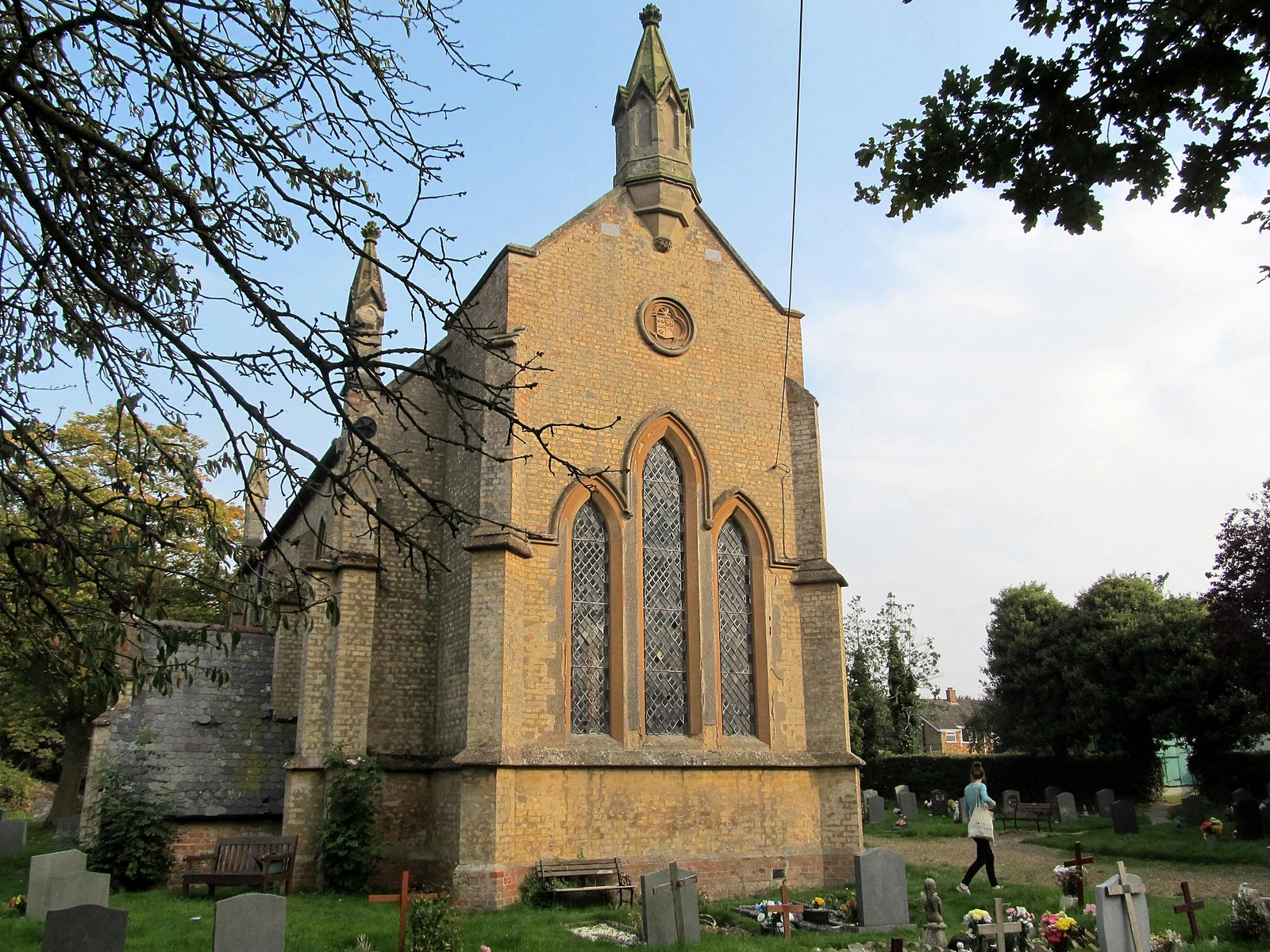
St John's Church of 1839, disused since 1995.

Holbrook Grange, a Georgian era manor house, located just north of the village next to the Avon, is grade II listed.

The village church of St John, was built in 1839 as a chapel of ease for the main church at nearby Newbold-on-Avon. It was built mainly for the use of servants at nearby Holbrook Grange. The church has been disused since 1995, having been declared unsafe due to structural faults. It is however grade II listed and still standing. Instead the church services now take place at the church hall of 1939 next door. There is also a Methodist church on School Street, called the Lawford Light House

== Notable residents ==
- Ray Mawby (1922-1990) - Conservative politician and Member of Parliament - later revealed to have been a spy for Communist Czechoslovakia.

== Folklore ==
The village and surrounding area is reputedly haunted by a one-armed spectre, known as One-handed Boughton.,
