= History of rugby =

History of rugby may refer to:

- History of rugby league
- History of rugby union
- History of Rugby, Warwickshire
