= Pipewell Abbey =

English Cistercian abbey

Coordinates: 52°27′42″N 0°45′52″W

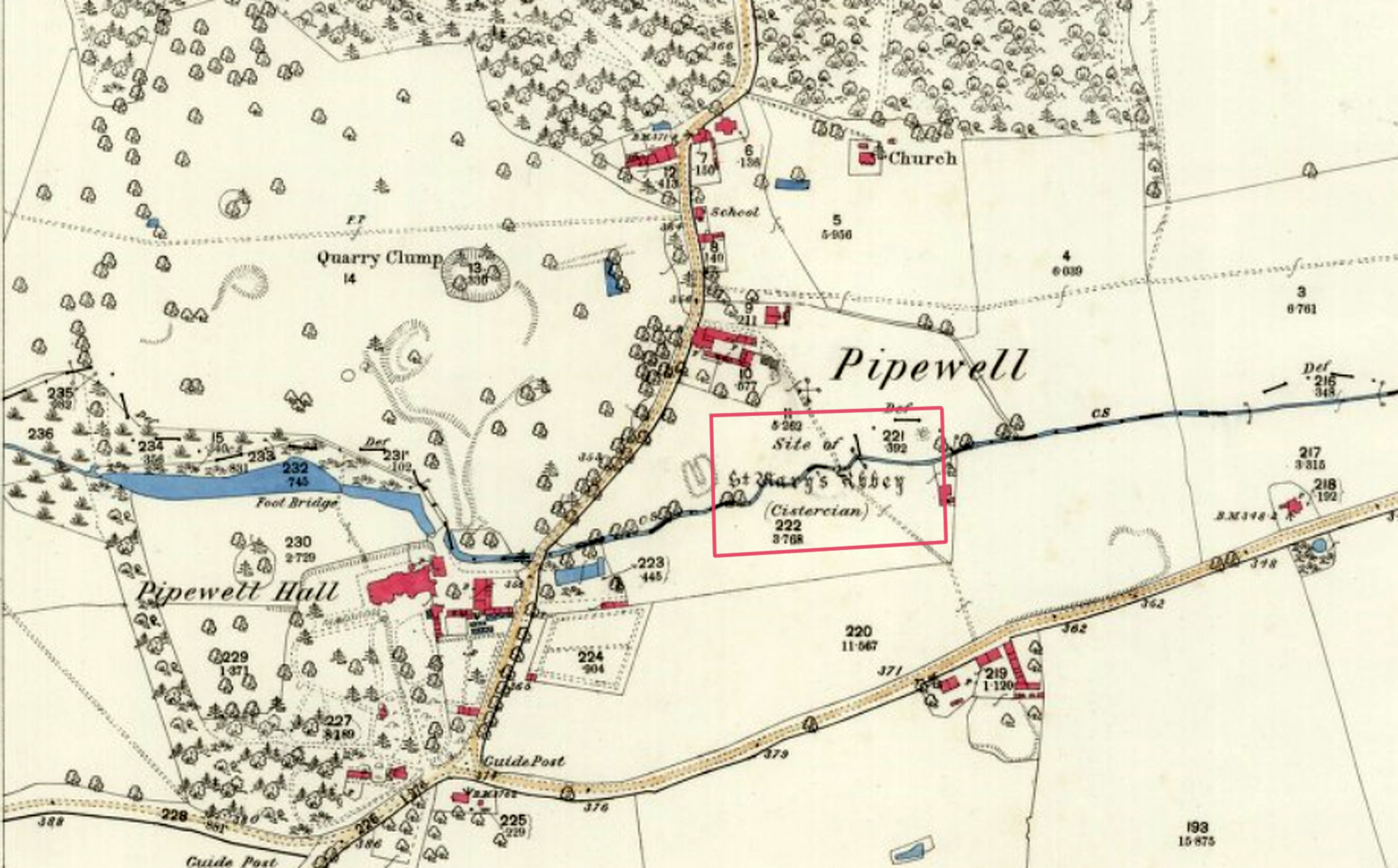
1886 map of Pipewell, showing the location of the former Abbey

Pipewell Abbey was an English Cistercian abbey, in the Northamptonshire hamlet of Pipewell in the old Rockingham Forest. It was established in 1143 by William Butevilain as a daughter house of Newminster Abbey in Northumberland.

The Abbey also held properties in the neighbouring county of Warwickshire, in the area of Rugby, which was then a small village, the monks had several granges at the villages of Cawston, Thurlaston, Little Lawford and Long Lawford and Rugby, with other properties at Bilton, Newbold-on-Avon, Toft, and possibly Church Lawford. The Cawston Grange was the largest and most valuable of their Warwickshire properties, and became the base of their operations there.

During the dissolution of the monasteries in 1538 the Abbey and its properties were seized by the Crown and sold off; the Abbey at Pipewell was sold to Sir William Parr, and in 1675, Pipewell Hall was built nearby from the stones of the Abbey. The Boughton family purchased many of the Warwickshire properties, including Cawston, Bilton, Little and Long Lawford, and Newbold.
