= Sir Egerton Leigh, 2nd Baronet =

Anglo-American aristocrat (1762-1818)

The Revd Sir Egerton Leigh, 2nd Baronet (25 March 1762 – 27 April 1818), an Anglo-American aristocrat, was founding minister of Rugby Baptist Church, Warwickshire.

== Background ==
Born in 1762, the eldest surviving son of Egerton Leigh, a prominent South Carolina colonial official and loyalist (created a baronet in 1773) and Martha Brymer (died 1801), daughter of Captain Francis Brymer, muster-master of the American Revolutionary Army by his wife Martha Laurens, he was a great-nephew (matrilineally) of Continental Congress president Henry Laurens, and (patrilineally) of Archdeacon Dr Egerton Leigh, seated at West Hall, High Legh, Cheshire.

Aged nineteen, upon the death of his father in 1781, Sir Egerton succeeded to the family baronetcy.

== Life ==
Educated at Westminster School, Leigh was commissioned into the 22nd Regiment of Foot serving with the British Army in the American Revolutionary War until 1781. Déclassé, in 1788, Sir Egerton married Theodosia Anna Maria Beauchamp Boughton, daughter of Sir Edward Boughton, 6th Baronet, and became seated in London and Warwickshire.

Establishing himself as the Preaching Baronet throughout the 1790s, Leigh founded Rugby Baptist Church in 1803, serving as Pastor until 1811.

In October 1812 Leigh arrived at New York City but being judged as an enemy alien was granted parole at Lexington, Virginia, in 1813 and was returned to England without seeing his youngest brother, Thomas Egerton Leigh (born 1776), a plantation owner of Georgetown County, South Carolina, later of Tyrrell County, North Carolina.

The Revd Sir Egerton Leigh died without surviving male issue on 27 April 1818 at Bath, Somerset and was succeeded in the baronetcy by his nephew, Sir Samuel Egerton Leigh, 3rd Baronet, only child of his younger brother the author, Samuel Egerton Leigh, KJ (1771–1796), who in 1795 married Cecilia Greig.

== Family ==
In 1788 Sir Egerton married Theodosia Anna Maria Beauchamp Boughton, daughter of Sir Edward Boughton, 6th Baronet, and widow of Captain John Donellan, RN (hanged 1781).

Sir Egerton and Lady Leigh had issue:

- Theodosia de Malsburg Leigh, born 1792, married 1811 John Lucas-Ward later Ward-Boughton-Leigh, JP, DL, of Brownsover Hall, Warwickshire, and of Great Addington Hall, Northamptonshire, High Sheriff of Northamptonshire and of Warwickshire (born 1790; died 18 June 1868), fourth son of William Zouch Lucas-Ward, JP, DL, of Guilsborough, Northamptonshire (see BLG 1868 WARD of Guilsborough), who assumed by Royal Licence 1831 the additional names and arms of Boughton and Leigh, and died 11 December 1869, leaving issue (see BLG 1972 WARD-BOUGHTON-LEIGH of Brownsover Hall);
- Egerton Leigh, born 1795; died 1804.

Lady Leigh married thirdly 10 February 1823, as his second wife, Surgeon-Captain Barry Edward O’Meara, RN (who died 3 June 1836), and died 13 January 1830.

== See also ==
- Leigh baronets
