= Avon Valley School =

The Avon Valley School and Performing Arts College
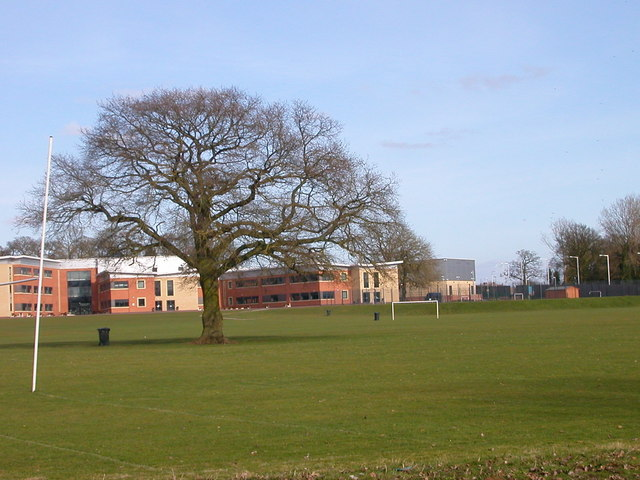

Location
- Newbold Road; Rugby, Warwickshire, CV21 1EH; England
- Coordinates: 52°23′05″N 1°16′25″W

Information
- Type: Foundation school
- Local authority: Warwickshire
- Specialist: Arts (performing arts)
- Department for Education URN: 125764 Tables
- Ofsted: Reports
- Headteacher: Blake Francis
- Gender: Mixed
- Age: 11 to 16
- Enrolment: 1,096
- Website: https://www.avonvalleyschool.org/

The Avon Valley School and Performing Arts College is a mixed secondary school in the Newbold area of Rugby, Warwickshire, England. The school is non-selective, catering for students aged 11–16.

The school opened on its current site on Newbold Road in 1956 as Newbold Grange High School. Until the early 1990s, under the headship of Mr Turbayne, the school was subject to much criticism, with a relatively bad reputation.

In September 1992, Mark Braine took over as headteacher, at which point the school was renamed The Avon Valley School. Since then, the school roll has grown in number. On 28 June 2004, the school was reduced to rubble by fire. From the following September, it moved into temporary class rooms.

In October 2004, Mark Braine took leave of absence, left the school's employment in April 2005, and on 27 September 2006, a disciplinary order was made against him by the General Teaching Council, taking effect on 11 October 2006. Mark Braine was also found guilty of unacceptable professional conduct, including bullying and manipulating colleagues, making unwanted advances to seven women staff members, and giving his wife and daughter jobs at the school.

In 2006, Don O'Neill, who had been deputy headteacher under Mark Braine and acting headteacher from October 2004, was appointed headteacher. In September 2007, the school reopened in brick buildings for the first time since the fire, this time, as The Avon Valley School and Performing Arts College.

In 2014 Alison Davies was appointed Headteacher of the school. Currently David Pearson and Darren Walden are Deputy Headteachers and Lee Hawkins, Laura Bindley and Nancy Carnell are Assistant Headteachers at the school.

== Refurbishments ==
After two severe cases of arson attack, Avon Valley was newly built and refurbished in 2007. This meant that new resources were supplied, including drama rooms, an assembly hall and a gym. Also supplying students with new art materials.
