= Ernst von der Malsburg =

German statesman, poet, and translator

Ernst Friedrich Georg Otto, Freiherr von der Malsburg (June 23, 1786 – September 20, 1824) was a German statesman, poet, and translator.

Born at Hanau, Ernst Friedrich was the younger son of Baron Friedrich Wilhelm von der Malsburg by his wife Elizabeth Leigh, daughter of Sir Egerton Leigh, 1st Baronet. His father, a Lieutenant-Colonel commanded the Infanterie-Regiment von der Malsburg as allies of George III during the American War of Independence; he was also brother-in-law to David Garrick's nephew, Nathan Garrick (died 1780), the first husband of Martha Leigh.

Appointed Envoy of the Electorate of Hesse to the Kingdom of Saxony in 1817, he wrote Romantic poetry, a collection of which was published as Poetischer Nachlaß in Kassel in 1825. He is probably best known however for his translations of the works of Spanish playwrights Pedro Calderón de la Barca and Félix Lope de Vega y Carpio into German. He translated a large number of Calderón's works, published in Leipzig in six volumes from 1818 to 1825, as well as three of Lope de Vega's plays, published as Stern, Zepter und Blume in Dresden in 1824.

Baron von der Malsburg died in 1824 at his estate, Schloss Escheberg, near Kassel, and was survived by his mother, who died in 1855.
