= Charles Rouse-Boughton =

British politician (1747–1821)

Sir Charles Rouse Boughton
- Born: 11 December 1747
- Died: 26 February 1821 (aged 73)
- Spouse: Catherine Pearce
- Parent(s): Shuckburgh Boughton; Mary Greville

Sir Charles William Rouse Boughton (11 December 1747 – 26 February 1821) was an administrator in India with the East India Company and subsequently a member of the British House of Commons representing first Evesham and then Bramber.

== Biography ==
=== Early life ===
The younger son of Shuckburgh Boughton of Poston Court, Herefordshire, and Mary Greville (20 December 1713 – 1 March 1786), daughter of the Hon. Algernon Greville, and the Hon. Mary Somerset, daughter of Lord Arthur Somerset (1671–1743), son of Henry Somerset, 1st Duke of Beaufort, Boughton travelled to India as a writer in 1765 and held several judicial and administrative offices in the service of the East India Company. He was at various times a Persian interpreter, senior merchant and a judge. During his time in India, he inherited an estate at Rous Lench, Worcestershire by the will of Thomas Phillips Rouse.

He left the East India Company and after returning to England in 1778, stood for Parliament at Evesham in 1780, where he was elected as one of the members after a hard-fought battle. His main interest in politics was India, and the speeches which he made between 1780 and 1790 all dealt with Indian affairs. In 1784 he was appointed Secretary to the Board of Control for India and held the post until 1791. He opposed the impeachment of Warren Hastings.

=== Later life ===
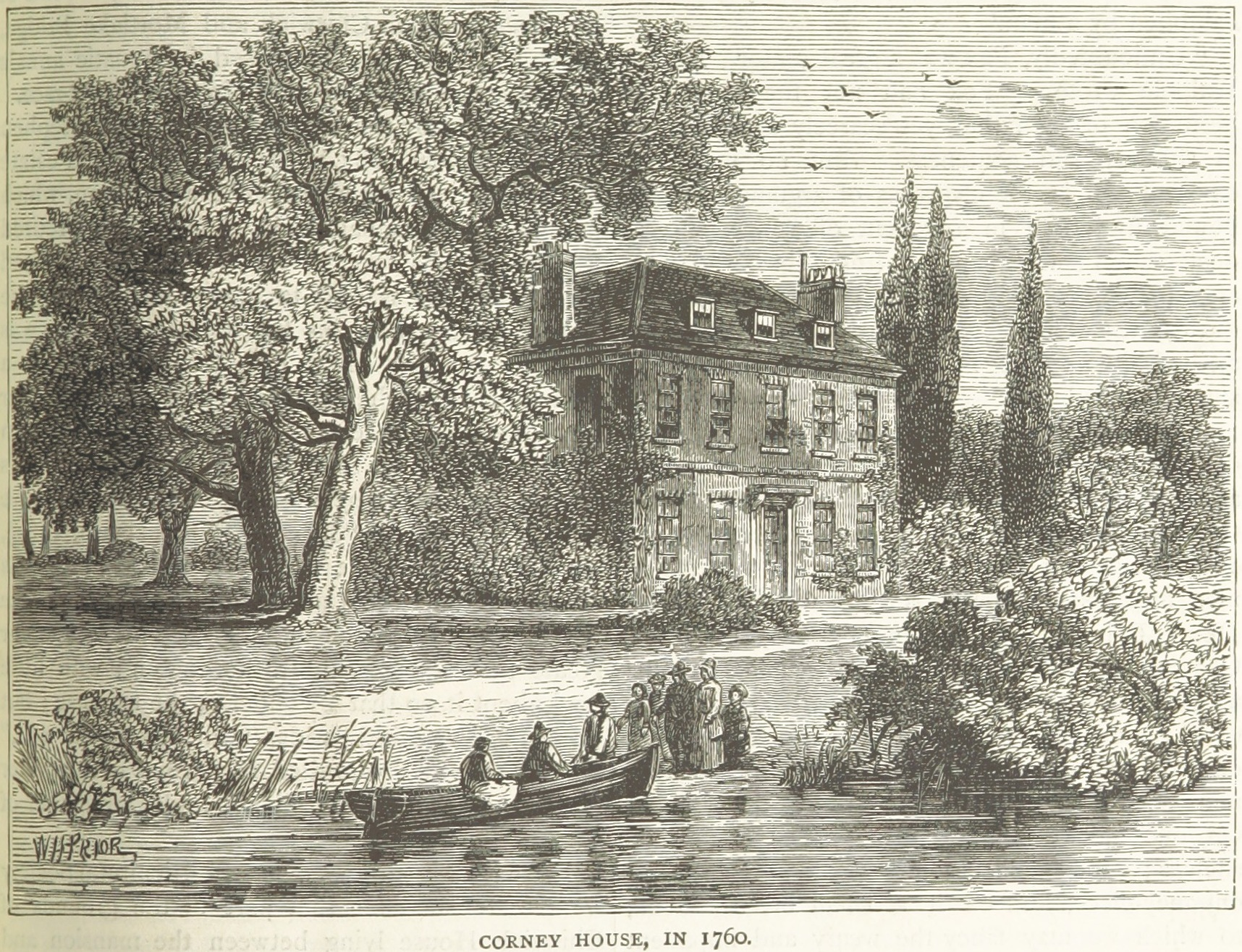
Corney House, Chiswick in 1760

Boughton did not contest the 1790 election and stood down from Parliament. He assumed the additional surname of Rouse by Royal Licence in 1791 and was created a baronet as Boughton Rouse. In 1794 he also inherited the title 9th Baronet of Lawford and adopted the surname of Rouse Boughton.

At the general election in 1796 Sir Charles was returned unopposed at Bramber, a notorious Rotten borough, where an agreement had operated since 1774, by which the two owners of the `miserable thatched cottages' who had the right to vote at Bramber returned a member each. In the new Parliament, he spoke several times on Indian affairs. He vacated his seat in 1800 when he was appointed an Audit Commissioner, a post he held until his death in 1821.

== Family ==
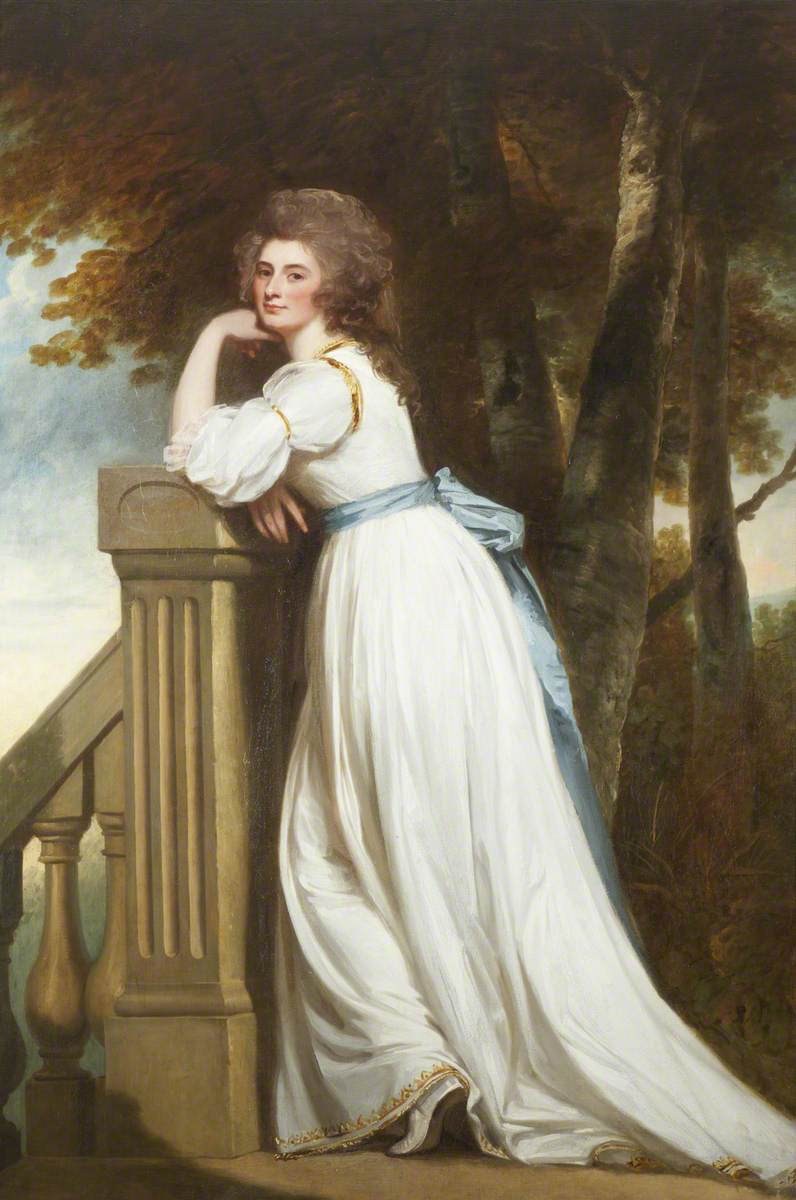
Lady Rouse Boughton, painted by George Romney, 1785-1787.

He married Catherine Pearce, the daughter of William Pearce and his wife Catherine Comyn, in 1781. Catherine was the heiress of the Downton estates near Ludlow, including Downton Hall. This was fortunate for Sir Charles since his elder brother Sir Edward had bequeathed the Boughton estates to Elisabeth Davis, his natural daughter by a serving maid, who later married Sir George Braithwaite, 2nd Baronet. Lady Rouse Boughton enhanced the estate at Downton, planting High Grove, or Catherine's Grove, and her portrait was painted by Romney in 1785. Sir Charles was interested in agriculture and was renowned for his remarkable pig. In London, he lived at Corney House, Chiswick.

Sir Charles' son William inherited the family baronetcies and his daughter Louise (1785 – 9 July 1860) married firstly St Andrew St John, 14th Baron St John of Bletso and secondly Sir John Vaughan.

In the programme Who Do You Think You Are? (transmitted on BBC2 on 23 August 2010), comedian Alexander Armstrong discovered that his mother is a descendant through Louise's first marriage to Lord St John of Bletso.

== See also ==
- Rouse-Boughton baronets

Parliament of Great Britain
| Preceded by Henry Seymour; John Rushout | Member of Parliament for Evesham; 1780–1790; With: John Rushout | Succeeded by Thomas Thompson; John Rushout |
| Preceded by Thomas Coxhead; Sir Henry Gough | Member of Parliament for Bramber; 1796–1800; With: James Adams | Succeeded by John Henry Newbolt; James Adams |
Baronetage of England
| Preceded by Edward Boughton | Baronet (of Lawford); 1794–1821 | Succeeded by William Edward Rouse Boughton |
Baronetage of Great Britain
| New creation | Baronet (of Rouse Lench); 1791–1821 | Succeeded by William Edward Rouse Boughton |
