= Bilton School =

Location
- Lawford Lane; Rugby, Warwickshire, CV22 7JT; England; 52°21′47″N 1°17′49″W

Information
- Type: Secondary academy
- Motto: Be the best you can be
- Established: 1977
- Local authority: Warwickshire
- Department for Education URN: 145575 Tables
- Ofsted: Reports
- Executive headteacher: R. S. Samra
- Gender: Co-educational
- Age: 11 to 18
- Enrolment: 1,020 (2016)
- Colours: Navy blue – KS3 and KS4 Boys and Girls █
- Website: www.biltonschool.co.uk

Bilton School is a secondary school with academy status for pupils aged 11–18 in the Bilton area of Rugby, Warwickshire. There were 1,020 students on roll in the 2015–2016 school year, with 69 staff and 17 teaching assistants.

== History ==
The school can trace its origins to The St Matthew's Schools in Rugby, which were founded in 1852, and originally comprised Boys', Girls' and Infants' schools: In 1919 the Boys' School was reorganised to only take boys aged eleven and upwards, and became known as the Central School. In 1945 it became known as the Senior Boys' School, and later St Matthew's Secondary Modern School. It became St Matthew's High School for Boys in 1960, and moved to Bilton in 1963, where it was renamed the Herbert Kay High School. In 1977 it amalgamated with the Westland High School for Girls to become Bilton High School.

St Matthew's Girls' School, Rugby, had become Westland County Secondary School for Girls in 1947, and later Westland High School for Girls. It moved to Bilton in the late 1960s, in a new building alongside Herbert Kay High School, until the two schools were amalgamated in 1977 to create a mixed-sex comprehensive school.

=== 2025 Culture Day ===
In July 2025, the school organised a culture day intended to celebrate the school's diverse population. A student came wearing a Union Jack dress together with a Culture Day themed speech but was forbidden from taking part in the event by a school administrator. The student said that teachers told her the dress was inappropriate and that only other, non-British, cultures can be celebrated in this event. The school has apologized to the girls' family. The incident provoked a statement by the British PM Keir Starmer that “being British is something to be celebrated”. The school closed on Friday 18 July 2025, the last day of term, citing “extremist abuse” and “personal threats to staff”.

== Academic performance and inspections ==
Ofsted inspection in 2016 found the school to be "Inadequate" in all categories except its sixth form which was rated as "Good", and the school was placed in special measures. The inspectors highlighted issues of poor leadership, poor behaviour, bullying and teaching which was handicapped by a large turnover of staff and middle leaders. GCSE results had declined from 62% of students gaining 5 good GCSEs (including English and mathematics) in 2013, to 36% in 2015. This followed a Section 8 inspection in April 2015 which found that "Leaders and managers have not taken effective action to maintain the high standards of behaviour and attitudes identified at the academy's previous inspection".

As of 2025, the school's most recent inspection was in 2021, with an overall judgement of Good.

=== Results (% 5+ A*-C grades) ===
- 2011: 58%
- 2012: 62%
- 2013: 62%
- 2014: 51%
- 2015: 36%
- 2016: 57%
