= Sir Egerton Leigh, 1st Baronet =

British jurist

Sir Sir Egerton Leigh Bt

Attorney-General of South Carolina
- In office 1765–1774
- Monarch: George III
- Preceded by: James Michie
- Succeeded by: James Simpson

Personal details
- Born: 11 October 1733 High Legh, Cheshire, England
- Died: 15 September 1781 (aged 47) Charleston, South Carolina
- Spouse: Martha Bremar
- Children: 13, including Sir Egerton Leigh & Sir Samuel Leigh
- Parent(s): Peter Leigh (1711–1759); Elizabeth Latus (d.1775)
- Education: Westminster School
- Occupation: Jurist, Attorney-General of South Carolina
- Known for: Loyalist during the American Revolutionary War

Sir Egerton Leigh, 1st Baronet (11 October 1733 – 15 September 1781), was a British colonial jurist, who served as HM Attorney-General of South Carolina. A Loyalist, Sir Egerton fled South Carolina for England in 1774, returning in 1780.

== Biography ==
A scion of the ancient Leighs of West Hall, High Legh, Cheshire, he was the eldest son of Peter Leigh, High Bailiff of Westminster, and Elizabeth née Latus. Educated at Westminster School in London, he emigrated to America when his father became Chief Justice of South Carolina.

Leigh qualified as a barrister and served as a Member of Council and a Judge of the Vice-Admiralty Court, before becoming Surveyor-General of South Carolina. He was appointed Attorney-General of South Carolina by King George III in 1765 and, on 15 May 1773, was created a Baronet, styled "of South Carolina, America".

In addition to his judicial appointments, Leigh bought tobacco plantations and was a Freemason of the Modern Lodges. Provincial Grand Master of South Carolina from 1772, he hosted a rather large celebration in Charleston for his election. Following an adultery scandal and pledging his continued loyalty to the Crown, his credibility was ruined so no masonic meetings were held, but by default Leigh remained Provincial Grand Master for nine years until he was finally succeeded by John Deas in 1781.

In 1756 he married Martha Bremar (died 1801) and they had 13 children, including: Martha Leigh who married Nathan Garrick, nephew of David Garrick; Elizabeth Leigh who married Brigadier Count Friedrich Wilhelm von der Malsburg; Harriet Leigh who married Captain James Burnett, RM, younger brother of Sir Thomas Burnett of Leys, 6th Baronet; the Revd Sir Egerton Leigh, 2nd Baronet (1762–1818); Sir Samuel Leigh, KJ (1770–1796), author of "Munster Abbey, a Romance: Interspersed with Reflections on Virtue and Morality" and father of Sir Samuel Egerton Leigh, 3rd Baronet (1796–c.1830); and, Thomas Leigh a plantation owner in Georgetown County, where he remained settled after the American Revolutionary War.

== See also ==
- Leigh baronets
- North Charleston, South Carolina

Baronetage of Great Britain
New creation	Baronet (of South Carolina); 1773–1781	Succeeded by Revd Sir Egerton Leigh
