= Poston Camp =

Hillfort in Herefordshire, England

Coordinates: 52.033515°N 2.934512°W

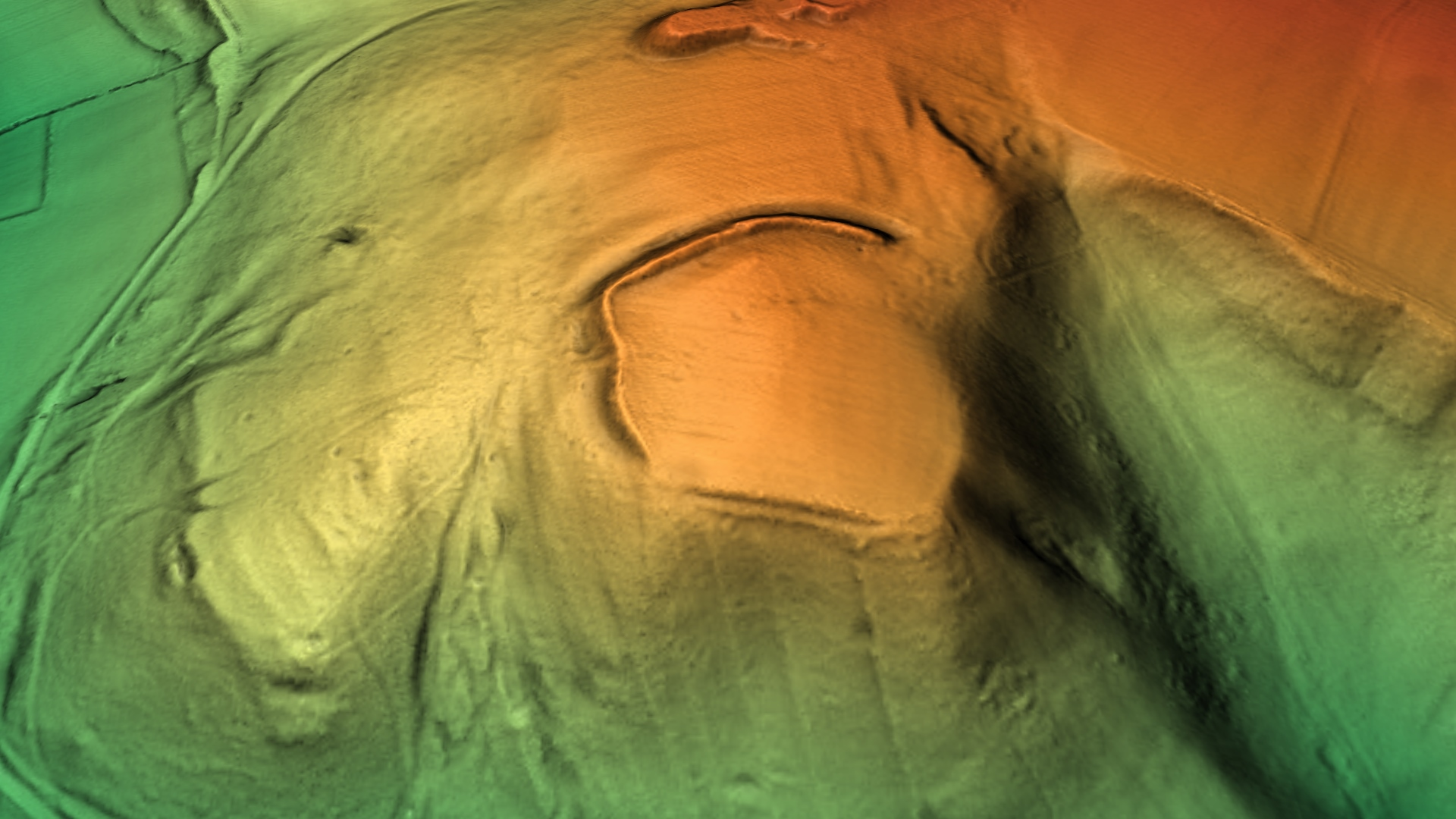
3D view of the digital terrain model

Poston Camp is an Iron Age hill fort located just south of Vowchurch, Herefordshire.
