= Downton Hall =

House in Stanton Lacy, Shropshire, England

Coordinates: 52.4094°N 2.6952°W

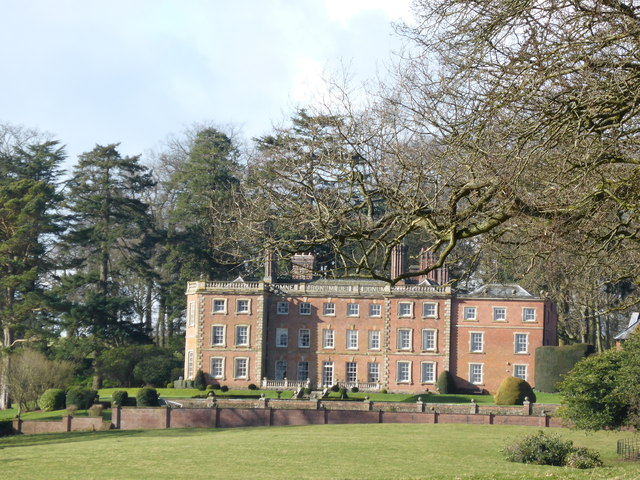
Downton Hall, Shropshire

Downton Hall is a privately owned 18th-century Grade II*-listed country house at Stanton Lacy, near Ludlow in Shropshire.

== History ==
The house was built circa 1733 by Wredenhall Pearce, who had inherited the estate from his mother, Anne née Wredenhall, in 1731. The new house, designed by William Smith Jr. of Warwick, of three storeys and with a twelve-bay frontage carrying a balustraded parapet, boasts an unusual circular entrance hall with Ionic columns and a honeysuckle frieze.

In 1781 Catherine, only daughter and heiress of William Pearce, married Sir Charles Rouse-Boughton Bt MP (see Boughton Baronets). His son, Sir William Rouse-Boughton Bt FRS MP, made improvements to Downton Hall in 1824 including a new entrance front, designed by architect Edward Haycock, with a Doric-style portico.

Sir Charles Rouse-Boughton Bt JP DL (1825–1906), High Sheriff of Salop (for 1860/61), was seated at Downton in 1881 with his family and nine domestic staff. Sir Charles married, in 1852, Mary Severne, having two sons and a daughter. The elder son, Sir William Rouse-Boughton Bt JP, High Sheriff of Salop (for 1914/15), married Eleanor Hotham, and had an only child, Major Sir Edward Rouse-Boughton, the 13th and last Baronet.

Sir Edward married firstly Daisy née Ismay (1895–1975), whose father White Star shipowner James Ismay was husband of Lady Margaret Seymour. They had an only child and sole heiress, Mary Rouse-Boughton (1917–1991). Having served during WWI with the 15th Hussars (promoted Captain), then with the Royal Navy Motor Boat Reserve (RNMBR) during WWII (promoted Major), in 1948 Sir Edward divorced and married secondly, Elizabeth née Hunter (1909–2002), living at Anchor Gate House, Seagrove on the Isle of Wight until his death in 1963, when the family's baronetcies became extinct.

His daughter, Miss Mary Rouse-Boughton who remained at Downton Hall serving as Joint Master (with her mother, Lady Rouse-Boughton) of the Ludlow Hunt from 1952 until 1973, died unmarried in 1991. She bequeathed the Downton Hall estate to her great-nephew, Michael Wiggin, Chairman of Ludlow Racecourse. Michael Wiggin, Among his grandparents are Brigadier-General Edgar Wiggin and Winifred Livingstone-Learmonth née Ismay (1871–1942), Lady Rouse-Boughton's elder sister.

== See also ==
- Rouse-Boughton baronets
- Listed buildings in Stanton Lacy
- Grade II* listed buildings in Shropshire
