= Newbold-on-Avon =

Suburb of Rugby, Warwickshire, England

Coordinates: 52.3879°N 1.2774°W

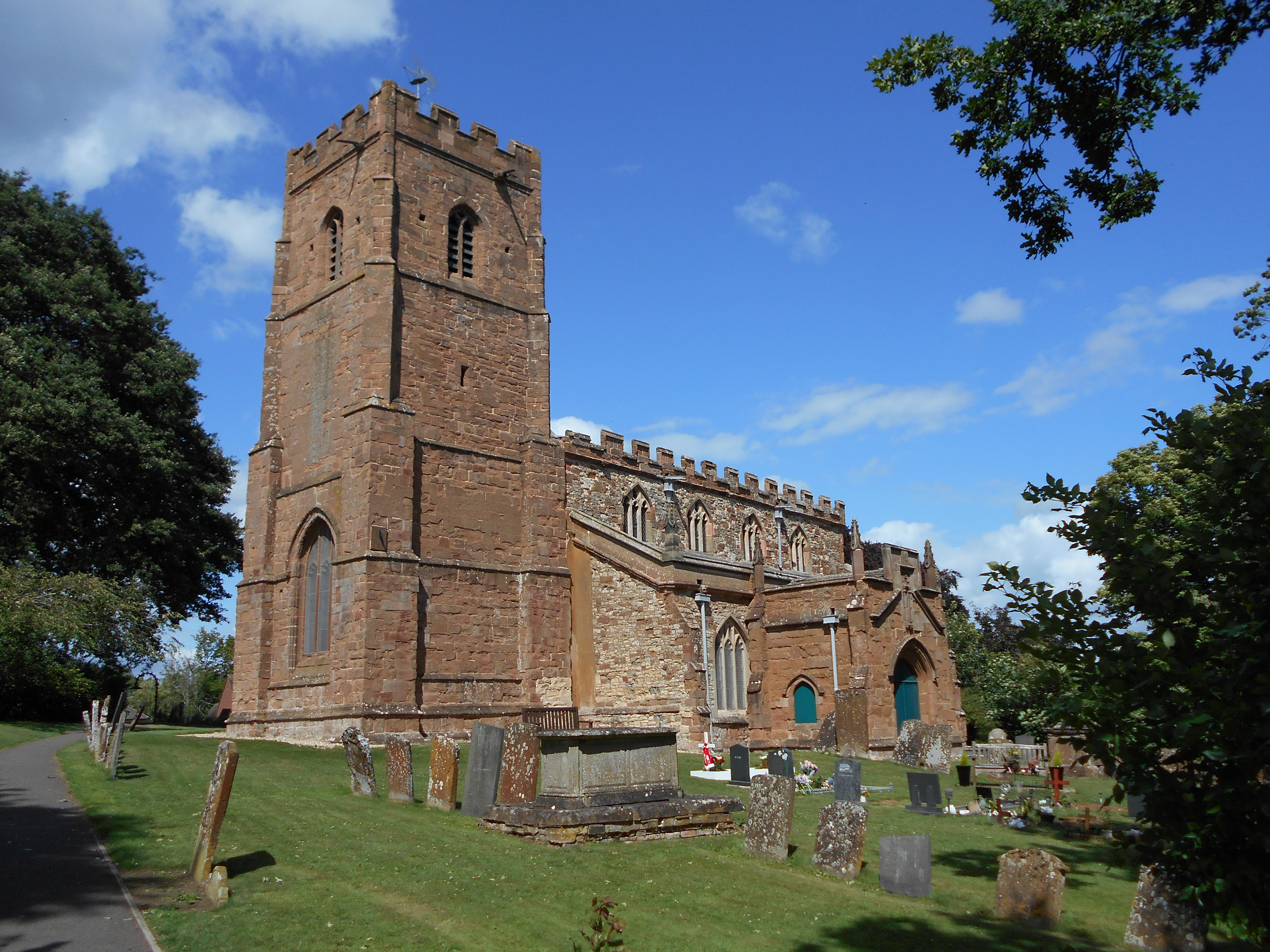
- St Botolph's Church

- Location within Warwickshire
- Population: 1,548 (2001)
- District: Rugby
- Shire county: Warwickshire
- Region: West Midlands
- Country: England
- Sovereign state: United Kingdom
- Post town: RUGBY
- Postcode district: CV21
- Dialling code: 01788
- Police: Warwickshire
- Fire: Warwickshire
- Ambulance: West Midlands
- UK Parliament: Rugby

Newbold-on-Avon (usually shortened to just Newbold) is a suburban village of Rugby in Warwickshire, England, located around 1½ miles north-west of the town centre, it is adjacent to the River Avon from which the suffix is derived. Newbold was historically a village in its own right, but was incorporated into Rugby in 1932. The name is derived from the Saxon Niowebold ('New house').

The ancient parish of Newbold-on-Avon contained the nearby settlements of Harborough Parva, Cosford, Long Lawford and Little Lawford. The latter three became separate civil parishes in the 19th century, while Harborough Parva was transferred to Harborough Magna parish in 1931. In 1931 the parish had a population of 696. On 1 April 1932 the parish was abolished and merged with Rugby and Harborough Magna.

The older part of the village of Newbold sits on a hill north of the River Avon on the B4112 road, and contains some old buildings, including some red brick 18th-century houses and some timber-framed buildings from the 17th century. The church of St Botolph in the old village dates from the 15th century, and is grade I listed and stands on the site of an earlier church. Newbold grew considerably during the 20th century, with a number of modern housing and industrial estates having been built to the east of the old village at the foot of the hill, around the Avon valley.

The Oxford Canal runs immediately to the north of Newbold, here it runs through the 250-metre-long Newbold Tunnel. This tunnel was built in 1829 as part of a scheme to straighten out the winding canal, and it replaced an older tunnel which dated from 1777 on the original route, which ran at a right-angle to the newer tunnel. The southern portal of the abandoned tunnel can be seen next to the churchyard, it is now bricked up but with two holes to allow for bats to enter. There is a canalside pub at Newbold, the Barley Mow (a second one The Boat having now closed). There is also another pub called the Newbold Crown closer to the centre of the village.

There are some former limestone quarries in the Newbold area. One of them has been converted into a nature reserve, known as Newbold Quarry Park. Another park named Newbold Centenary Park opened in 2016 off Parkfield Road: built on the site of former allotments, it was so named to mark the centenary of the First World War.

The main secondary school in Newbold is the Avon Valley School, which was formerly known as Newbold Grange High School until the early-1990s. Newbold is home to Newbold-on-Avon RFC.

== Gallery ==
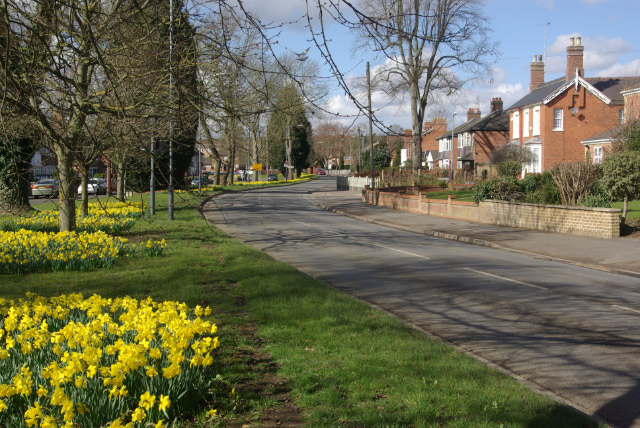
Newbold Road

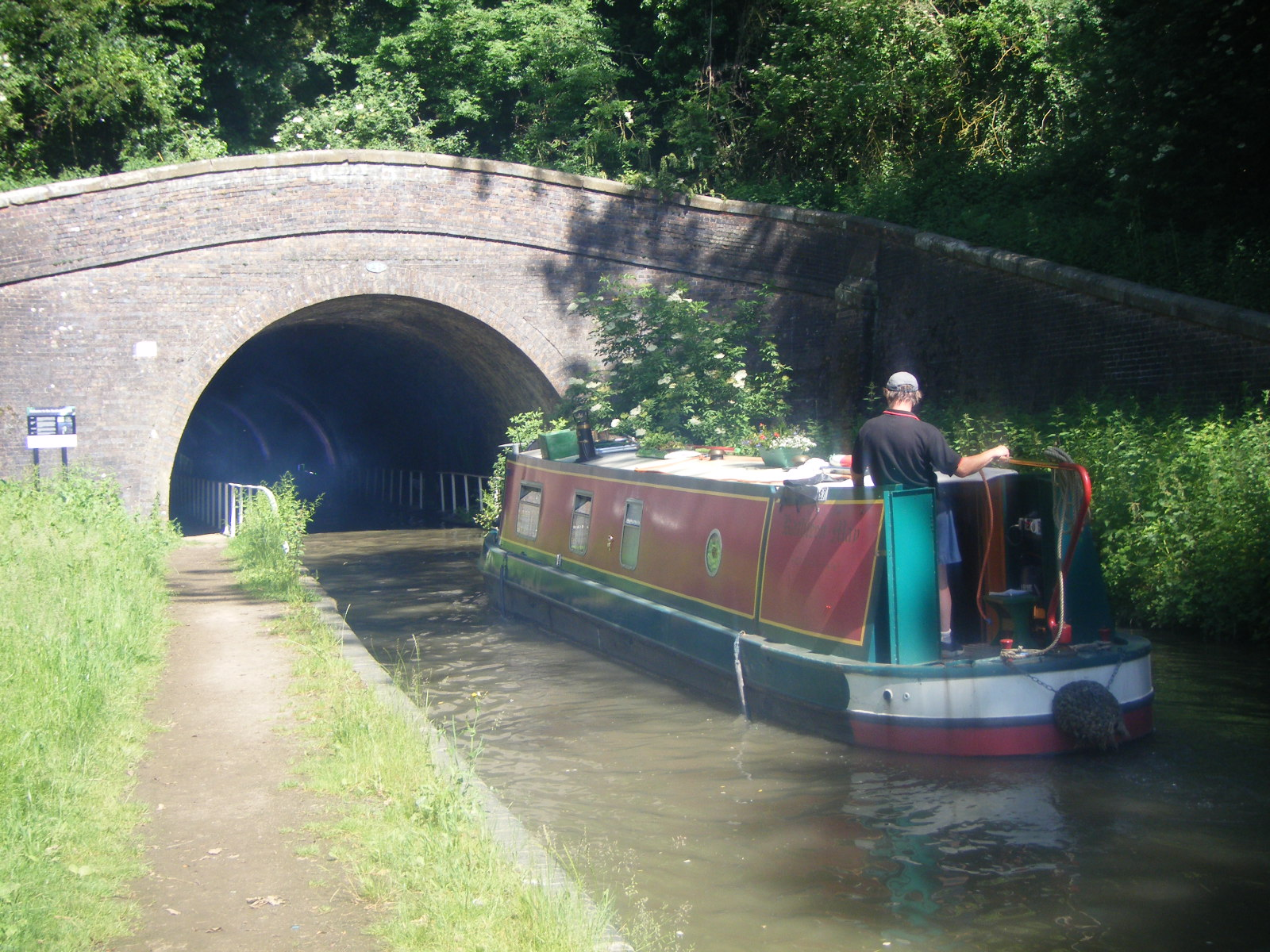
Newbold canal tunnel

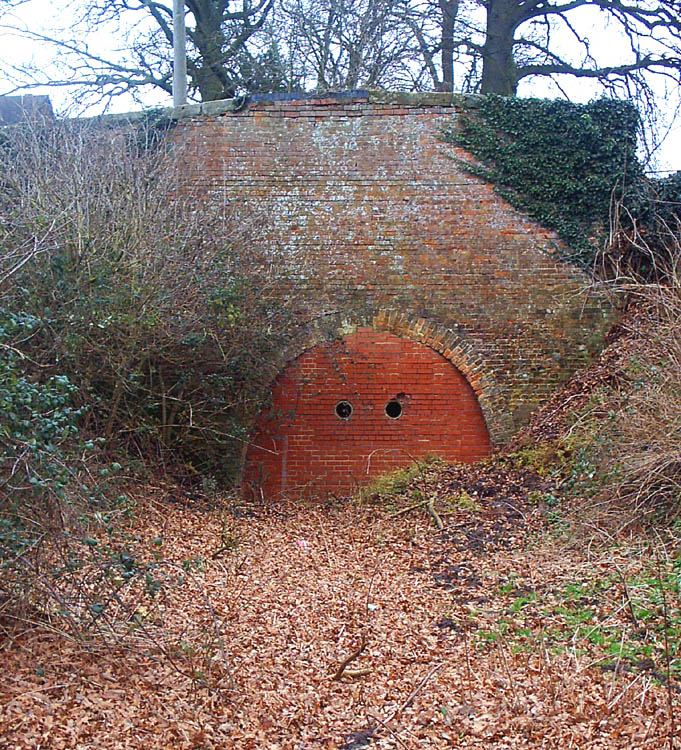
The abandoned tunnel on the old route of the canal

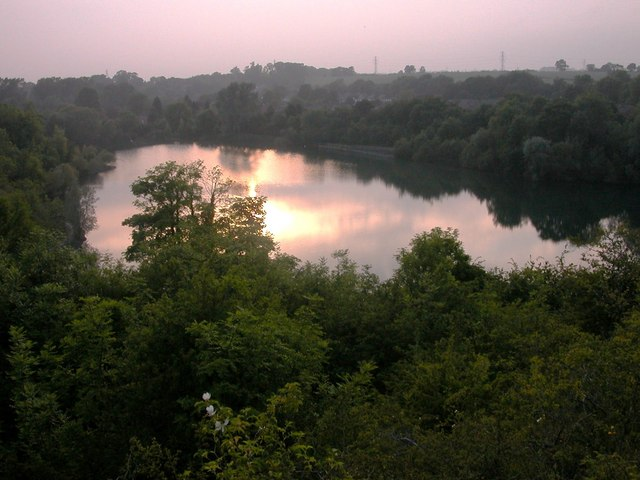
Newbold Quarry Park
