= Bilton, Warwickshire =

Suburb of Rugby in Warwickshire, England

Coordinates: 52.359442°N 1.290039°W

Bilton
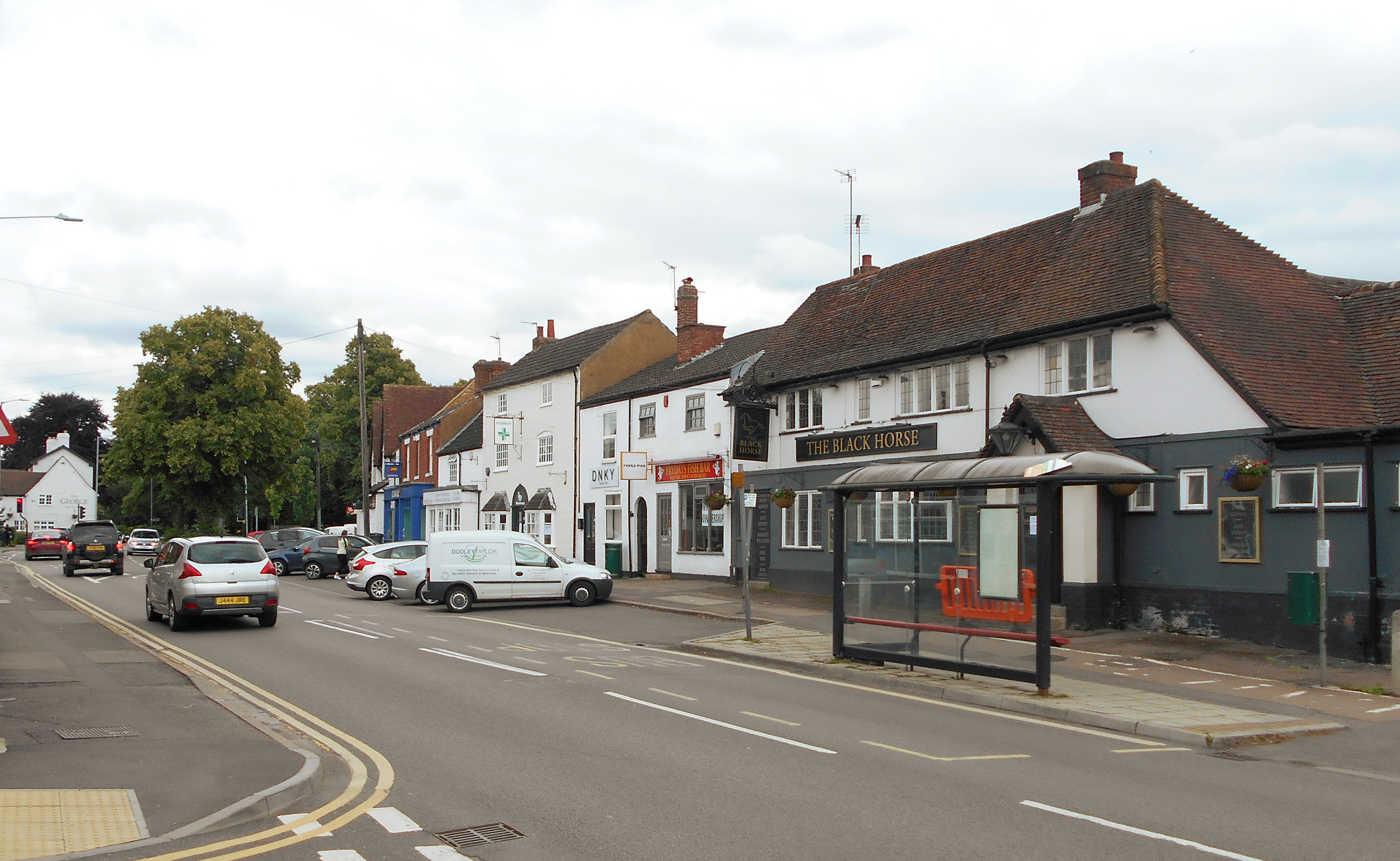
- Main Street, Bilton

- Location within Warwickshire
- Population: 6,544 (Ward 2021)
- OS grid reference: SP484736
- District: Rugby
- Shire county: Warwickshire
- Region: West Midlands
- Country: England
- Sovereign state: United Kingdom
- Post town: RUGBY
- Postcode district: CV22
- Dialling code: 01788
- Police: Warwickshire
- Fire: Warwickshire
- Ambulance: West Midlands
- UK Parliament: Rugby

Bilton is a suburb of Rugby in Warwickshire, England, located about 1.5 miles (2.4 km) south-west of Rugby town centre. It is also a ward of the Borough of Rugby, which at the 2021 Census had a population of 6,544. It comprises much of the western half of the town. Historically a village in its own right, Bilton was incorporated into Rugby in 1932.

== History ==
Historically a village in its own right (many residents continue to refer to the area as a village), Bilton's name is derived from the Anglo-Saxon Beolatun (Beola's town), and it was mentioned in the Domesday Book as both Beltone and Bentone. The parish Church of St. Mark in Bilton dates from the mid-14th century, but was expanded and restored in 1873. It is now grade II* listed.

In the early 20th century, Bilton was enveloped by the suburban expansion of Rugby. In 1932, when Rugby became a municipal borough, the civil parish of Bilton was abolished, and most of its territory incorporated into the new borough, with the remainder going to Dunchurch. In 1931 the parish had a population of 5966.

In the 1960s, two large housing estates were built at Bilton; the Admirals Estate and the Woodlands Estate, to the north and the south of the old village centre respectively: The Admirals Estate had its streets named after Admirals of the Royal Navy, whilst the streets in the Woodlands Estate, were given names with Shakespearean connections, as the estate was laid out in 1964, the quarter centenary of William Shakespeare's birth.

The old village centre of Bilton still survives. The village green of Bilton contains the remains of an ancient stone cross. Bilton Hall in the old village is a grade I listed building, the earliest parts of which date from 1623.

To the north of Bilton is the area known as New Bilton. To the east is the area of Overslade, to the south is the village of Dunchurch, and to the west is the suburban village of Cawston.

== Amenities ==
Most of the local amenities in Bilton are clustered around Main Street and The Green, including a number of shops and businesses, a post office, and two public houses; The Black Horse and The George.

== Education ==
Primary schools in Bilton include: Bawnmore Infant School, Bilton C. of E. Junior School, Bilton Infant School, Henry Hinde Infant and Junior Schools and Crescent School.

Secondary schools include: Bilton School and Rugby High School for Girls.

== Notable residents ==
- The writer and politician Joseph Addison (1672-1719) lived at Bilton Hall.
- The television presenter and actor Peter Purves lived in Bilton between 1987 and 1992.
- The 1960s pop singer Billy J. Kramer married a local woman, Ann Ginn, at St Mark's Church in Bilton in 1968, and lived locally for a number of years.

== Gallery ==
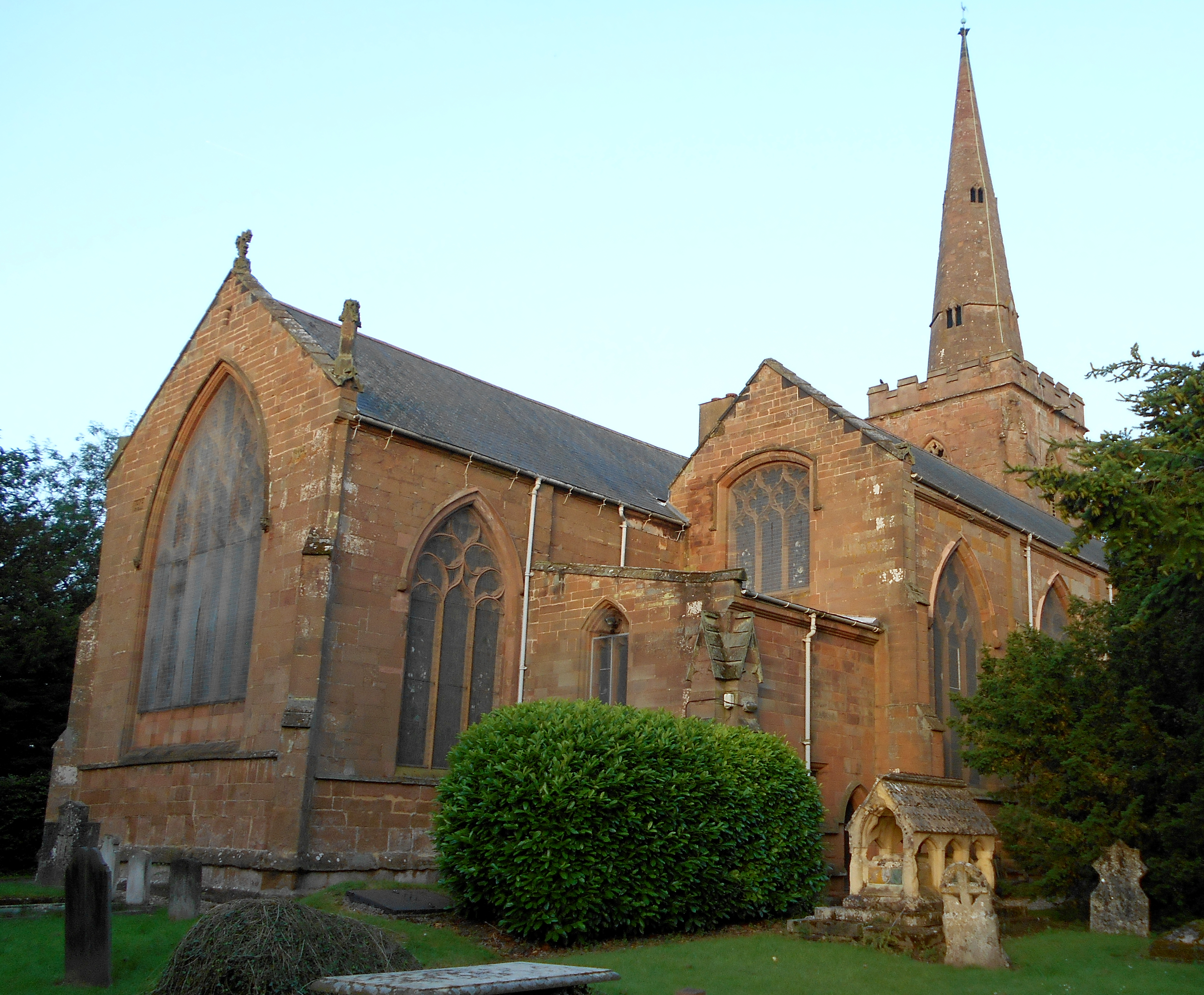
St Mark's Church

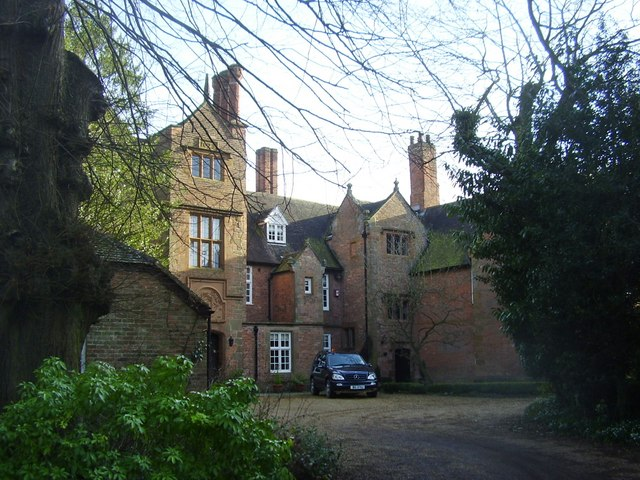
Bilton Hall

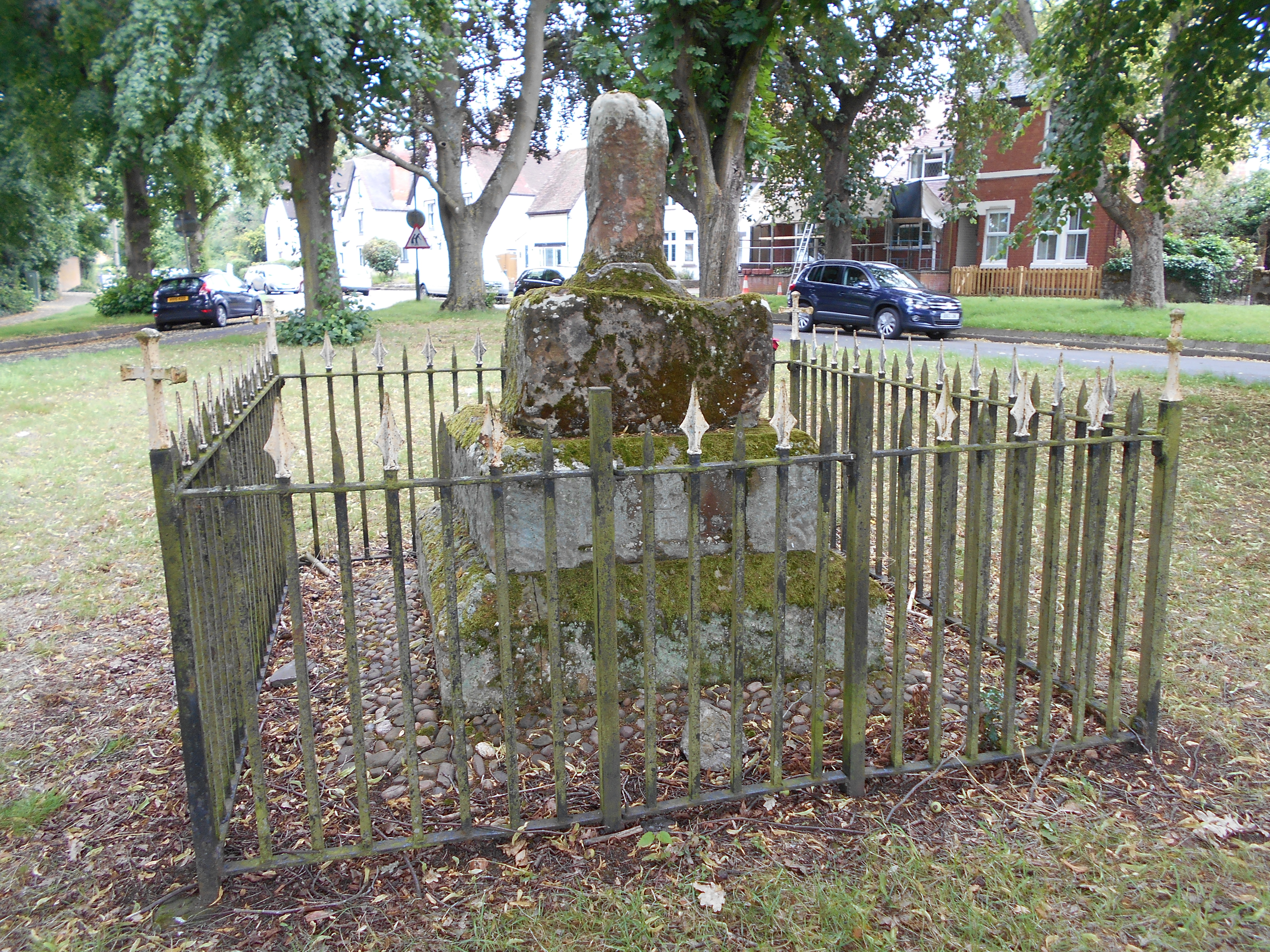
Old stone cross remains

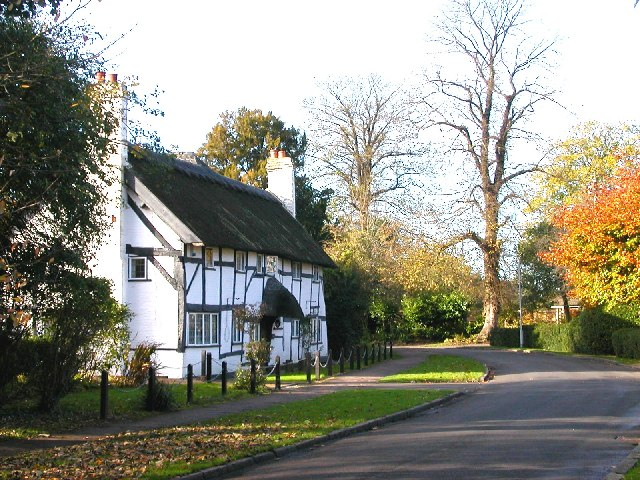
Church Walk
