= Boughton baronets of Lawford (1641) =

Extinct baronetcy in the Baronetage of England

Arms of Boughton of Lawford

The Boughton baronetcy, of Lawford in the County of Warwick, was created in the Baronetage of England on 4 August 1641 for William Boughton of Lawford Hall, at Little Lawford near Rugby, Warwickshire, as a reward for services to the Royalist cause.

Members of the family served as High Sheriff of Warwickshire. The 2nd and 4th Baronets both sat as Knight of the Shire for Warwickshire.

== 7th Baronet ==
The baronetcy descended in direct male line until Sir Theodosius, the 7th Baronet, still a minor, died in 1780. He was confined to his bed by severe illness at Lawford Hall, where his mother and sister, Mrs Donellan, wife of Captain Donellan, were living. He died immediately after taking a draught from the hands of Lady Boughton, and after his body was exhumed on a suspicion of poisoning, a Coroner's inquest returned a verdict of murder against Captain Donellan. Captain Donellan was tried and executed for the crime; the evidence against him was solely circumstantial and he died protesting his innocence. His widow subsequently married the Rev. Sir Egerton Leigh, 2nd Baronet.

== 8th Baronet ==
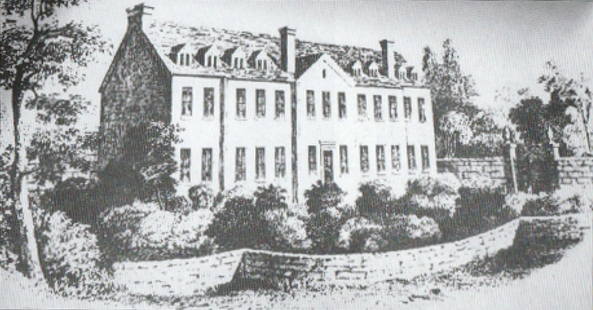
Lawford Hall, Little Lawford, Warwickshire, the Boughton family seat until 1780

The title was inherited by a grandson of the 4th Baronet by his second wife Catherine), Sir Edward Boughton, 8th Baronet, who sold Lawford Hall (later demolished) and the Warwickshire estate in 1793. On his death, the 8th Baronet left his estate to Eliza Davies, his illegitimate daughter. She later married Sir George Charles Braithwaite, 2nd Baronet (1762–1809).

== 9th Baronet ==
Edward's brother Charles, who followed as 9th Baronet in 1794, had on 28 July 1791 been created a Baronet, of Rouse Lench in the County of Worcester, in the Baronetage of Great Britain. He married the heiress of an estate in Downton, Shropshire and thereafter the family seat was at Downton Hall near Ludlow.

== Boughton baronets, of Lawford (1642) ==
- Sir William Boughton, 1st Baronet (1600–1656)
- Sir Edward Boughton, 2nd Baronet (1628–1681)
- Sir William Boughton, 3rd Baronet (1632–1683)
- Sir William Boughton, 4th Baronet (1663–1716)
- Sir Edward Boughton, 5th Baronet (1689–1722)
- Sir Edward Boughton, 6th Baronet (1719–1772)
- Sir Theodosius Boughton, 7th Baronet (1760–1780)
- Sir Edward Boughton, 8th Baronet (1742–1794)
- Sir Charles William Rouse-Boughton, 9th Baronet (already created a baronet in 1791.

See Rouse-Boughton baronets for later succession.
