= Rouse-Boughton baronets of Rouse Lench (1791) =

Escutcheon of the Rouse-Boughton baronets

Boughton-Rouse baronetcy, shortly thereafter Rouse-Boughton baronetcy, of Rouse Lench in the County of Worcester, was created on 28 July 1791 in the Baronetage of Great Britain for Charles William Boughton-Rouse, an East India Company employee who became Secretary of the India Board in 1784. He was Member of Parliament for Evesham from 1780 to 1790, and for Bramber from 1796 to 1800.

Originally Charles William Boughton, he had inherited in 1768 from Thomas Philips Rouse, and added Rouse to his surname. He married in 1782 the heiress Catherine Hall, daughter of William Pearce Hall of Downton Hall. In 1794 his brother Sir Edward Boughton, 8th Baronet, of the Boughton baronets of Lawford, died and Rouse-Boughton from that point held the united baronetcies.

The 3rd, 4th and 5th baronets all served as High Sheriff of Shropshire.< The baronetcies remained united, and became extinct in 1963.

== Rouse-Boughton baronets, of Rouse Lench (1791) ==
- Sir Charles William Rouse-Boughton, 1st and 9th Baronet (1747–1821)
- Sir William Edward Rouse-Boughton, 2nd and 10th Baronet (1788–1856)
- Sir Charles Henry Rouse-Boughton, 3rd and 11th Baronet (1825–1906)
- Sir William St Andrew Rouse-Boughton, 4th and 12th Baronet (1853–1937)
- Sir Edward Hotham Rouse-Boughton, 5th and 13th Baronet (1893–1963), left no male heir.

== Notes ==
Baronetage of Great Britain
Preceded by Martin baronets	Boughton-Rouse baronets of Rouse Lench; 28 July 1791	Succeeded by Hawkins baronets
