= Little Lawford =

Hamlet in Warwickshire, England

Coordinates: 52.391°N 1.312°W

Little Lawford is a hamlet and civil parish around 0.6 miles (0.97 km) to the north of the much larger village of Long Lawford and west of Rugby in Warwickshire, England. In the 2021 census the parish had a population of 45.

It is located just to the north of the River Avon, which is crossed by a ford on the lane linking it with Long Lawford. It is also linked to Long Lawford by a bridleway which crosses the Avon on a bridge.

== Lawford Hall ==
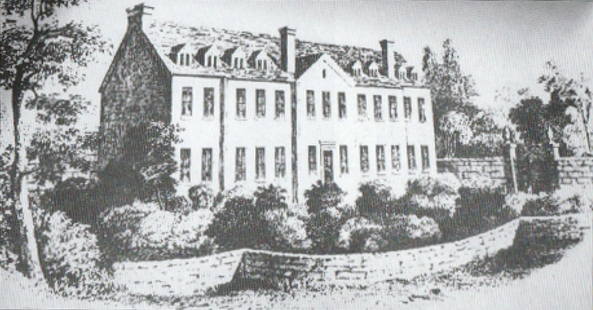
Engraving of the former Lawford Hall, demolished c 1790

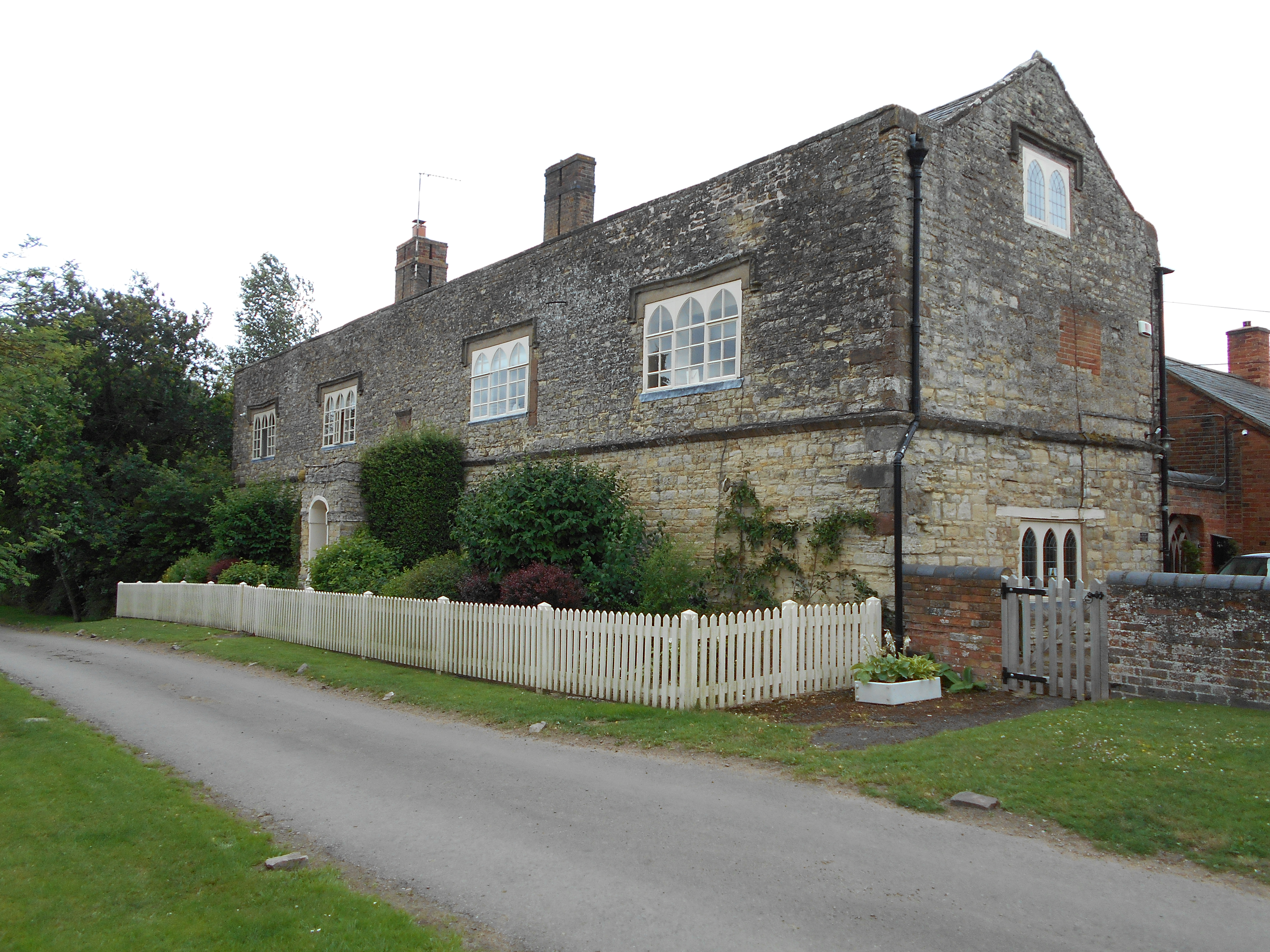
The current Little Lawford Hall, originally the stables of the former hall

In the hamlet is Little Lawford Hall. The original Lawford Hall was built during the reign of Henry VII, possibly on the site of an earlier monastic grange which belonged to the monks of Pipewell Abbey, which was dissolved during the dissolution of the monasteries. It became the ancestral home of the Rouse-Boughton family. According to folklore, one of the Boughtons lost his arm during the reign of Elizabeth I and his ghost which is known as 'One-handed Boughton' continues to haunt the area.

In 1780 the hall was the scene of a notorious murder case, when the heir to the family fortune Theodosius Boughton, died under mysterious circumstances while still a minor. It was soon determined that the cause of his death was poisoning, and suspicion soon fell on his brother-in-law, Captain John Donellan, husband of his sister, who would stand to gain the family inheritance if Theodosius died before the age of 21. Despite protesting his innocence, Donellan was tried and convicted of Boughton's murder, and hanged at Warwick the following year. Following these tragic events the family decided to demolish the hall in around 1790, sell the estate, and move elsewhere. Nothing now remains of it except foundations.

The current house known as Little Lawford Hall was originally the stables to the previous hall which were converted for human habitation in around 1800. The date inset above the front porch is 1604, which may have been when it was first built.

== Little Lawford Mill ==
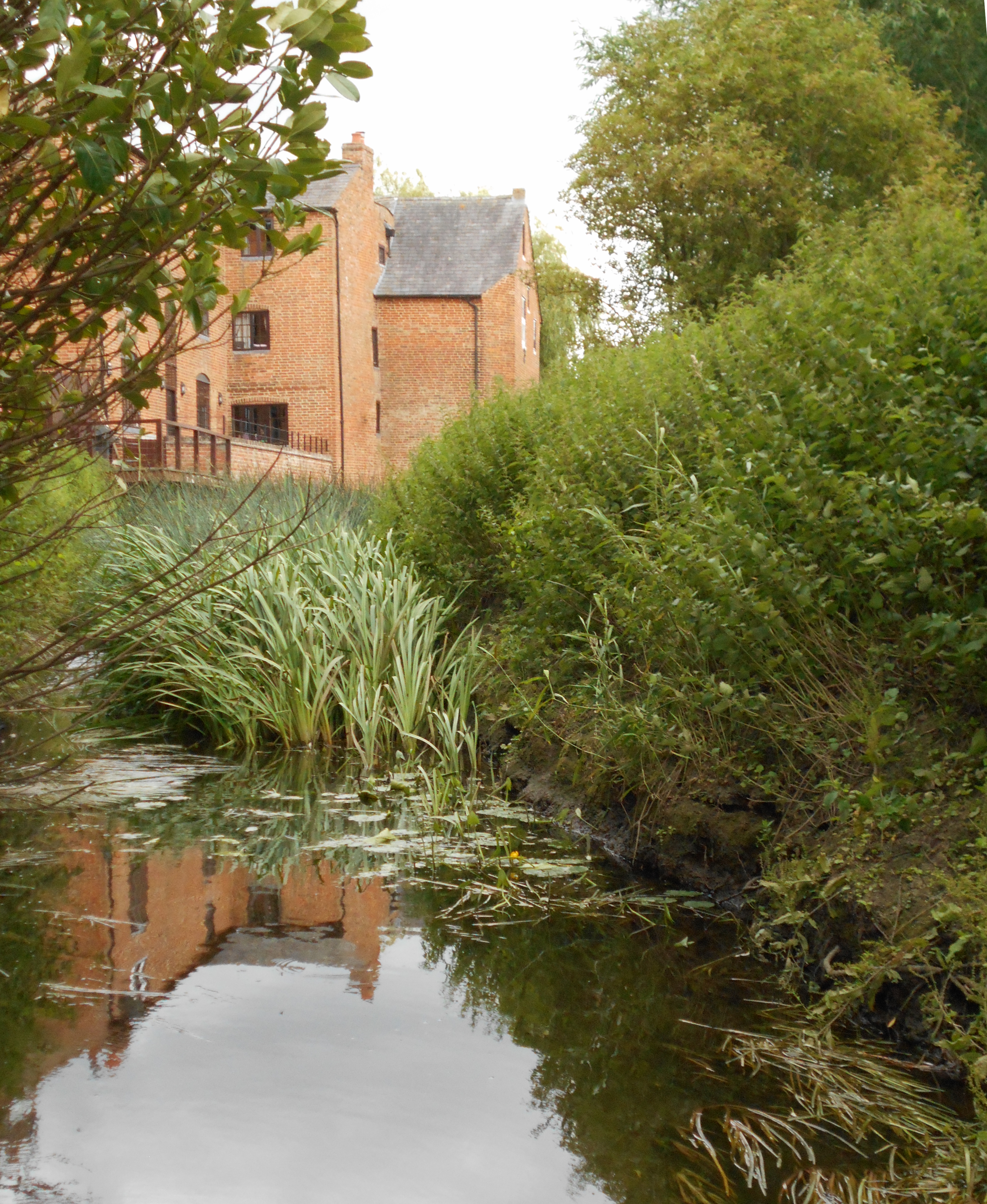
Little Lawford Mill

Also at Little Lawford is the former watermill on the river Avon. A mill was recorded here in the Domesday Book, and milling was a continuous activity here until as late as the 1920s. The former mill now without a waterwheel is now a private house.
