= Lilbourne =

Village in Northamptonshire, England

Coordinates: 52.3857°N 1.1745°W

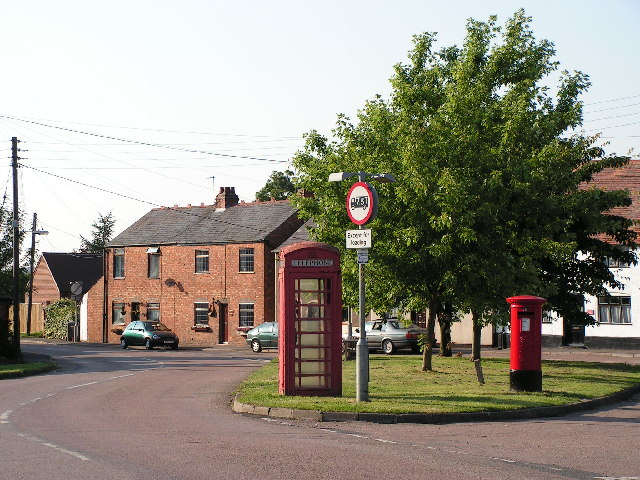
- Lilbourne village green

- Location within Northamptonshire
- Population: 320 (2022 mid-year estimate)
- OS grid reference: SP5676
- Unitary authority: West Northamptonshire
- Ceremonial county: Northamptonshire
- Region: East Midlands
- Country: England
- Sovereign state: United Kingdom
- Post town: Rugby
- Postcode district: CV23
- Dialling code: 01788
- Police: Northamptonshire
- Fire: Northamptonshire
- Ambulance: East Midlands
- UK Parliament: Daventry

Lilbourne is a village and civil parish in West Northamptonshire in England. It is close to the M1 motorway which runs east of the village, and the A5 road, west of the village which marks the boundary with Warwickshire, slightly to the north is the River Avon which marks the boundary with Leicestershire (the three counties meeting at Dow Bridge). As of mid-2022, the parish's population was around 320. The village was likely settled by the Saxons in around 500 AD and is first mentioned in the Domesday Book.

== History ==
The villages name means 'Lilla's stream'. Alternatively, the first element might be a stream-name, Lille.

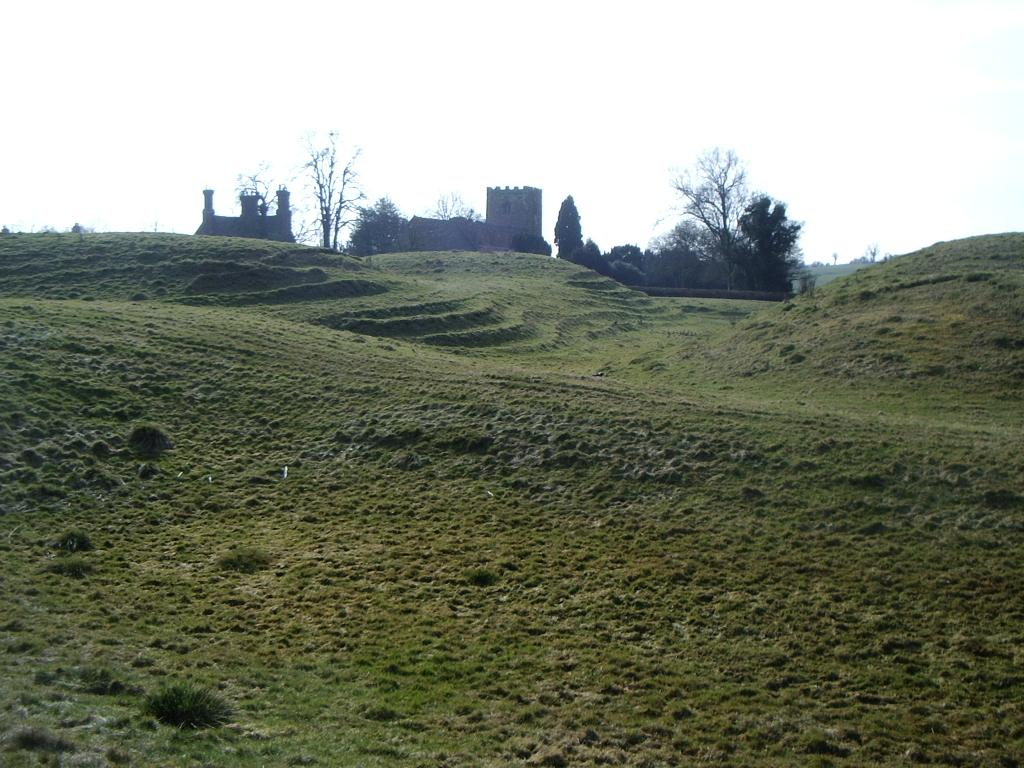
Lilbourne Castle

Just outside Lilbourne is the River Avon and the remains of a Norman motte-and-bailey castle. To the west of the castle is the local church, All Saints, which is Grade I listed building dating from the 12th century. A smaller motte-and-bailey castle lies 0.9 km to the north west of the village, at Lilbourne Gorse.

No. 73 Squadron RAF was stationed at nearby RAF Lilbourne during World War I. Lilbourne once had a railway station on the former London and North Western Railway line from Rugby to Market Harborough which closed in 1966 – one of hundreds of rural stations and lines which were closed by the Beeching Axe. The station was situated away from the main part of the village, in fact across the River Avon county border, just within the parish of Catthorpe, Leicestershire.

== Governance ==
The village is represented by Lilbourne Parish Council and is part of the Daventry Parliamentary Constituency.

The village is currently governed by West Northamptonshire council, where Lilbourne is part of the Braunston and Crick ward. The ward has two seats, both of which are held by the Liberal Democrats as of 1 May 2025.

Before local government changes, the local district council was Daventry District Council, and Lilbourne fell within the Northamptonshire County Council area.

== Geography ==
The village is located 75 mi (120 km) north-north-west of London, 15 mi (25 km) north-north-west of Northampton, 9 mi (14 km) north of Daventry, and 4 mi (6.5 km) south-west of Rugby.

Other nearby places include Catthorpe, Swinford, Shawell, Stanford-on-Avon, Clay Coton, Yelvertoft, Crick, Houlton and Clifton-upon-Dunsmore.

Lilbourne lies at approximately 106 m above sea level. The surrounding land is generally flat to gently rolling, characteristic of the Northamptonshire and Warwickshire border region. The village is situated near the River Avon, which flows to the south-west towards Rugby and eventually joins the River Severn. There are no major rivers running directly through Lilbourne itself, but several small streams and drainage channels run nearby, contributing to local farmland irrigation.

The village is also close to the Grand Union Canal, which runs to the east and south, serving as a significant historic waterway connecting the Midlands with London. The nearby landscape consists primarily of agricultural fields, with patches of woodland and small water bodies such as ponds and farm reservoirs.

The Charmouth Mudstone Formation forms the bedrock of Lilbourne; superficially, Oadby Till and River Terrace deposits are present.

Lilbourne hosts a local weather station operated by residents using a Davis Vantage Pro2. The station has been active since 2016 and provides up-to-date and historical weather data for the village. The station’s data is shared with national networks such as the Met Office WOW and Weather Underground.

== Demographics ==
The 2022 mid-year estimate produced by ONS put the population of Lilbourne at 320.

At the time of the 2001 census, the parish's population was 254 people, increasing to 273 at the 2011 census. The population data collected in the 2021 census has not yet been released at the parish or village level.

The 2021 census parish profile data reports that Lilbourne's ethnic composition is as follows, recording a total of 447 responses.

Number of responses
Asian, Asian British or Asian Welsh	16
Black, Black British, Black Welsh, Caribbean or African	1
Mixed or Multiple ethnic groups	5
White	423
Other ethnic group	2

The economic activity of Lilbourne's population is as follows. This data is taken from the parish profiles produced using data from the 2021 census.

Lilbourne
Total	363
Economically active	253
Economically active: In employment (including full-time students)	247
Economically active: Unemployed (including full-time students)	6
Economically inactive	110

== Amenities ==
Greenhaven Woodland Burial Ground, the first privately owned natural burial ground in the UK, is in Lilbourne.

Lilbourne has a large village hall that is used for fetes, jumble sales and general meetings as well as private hire events.

Lilbourne has a number of green spaces. There is a pocket park to the south of the village, a historic open space known as 'The Green' in the centre, and a children's play park next to the village hall.

== Future plans ==
Lilbourne Meadows is a nature reserve covering 193 acres which is currently being developed by The Wildlife Trust. It was first proposed as part of original plans for DIRFT III, and is scheduled to open fully to the public in 2025.
