= Clifton-upon-Dunsmore =

Village in Warwickshire, England

Coordinates: 52.383°N 1.221°W

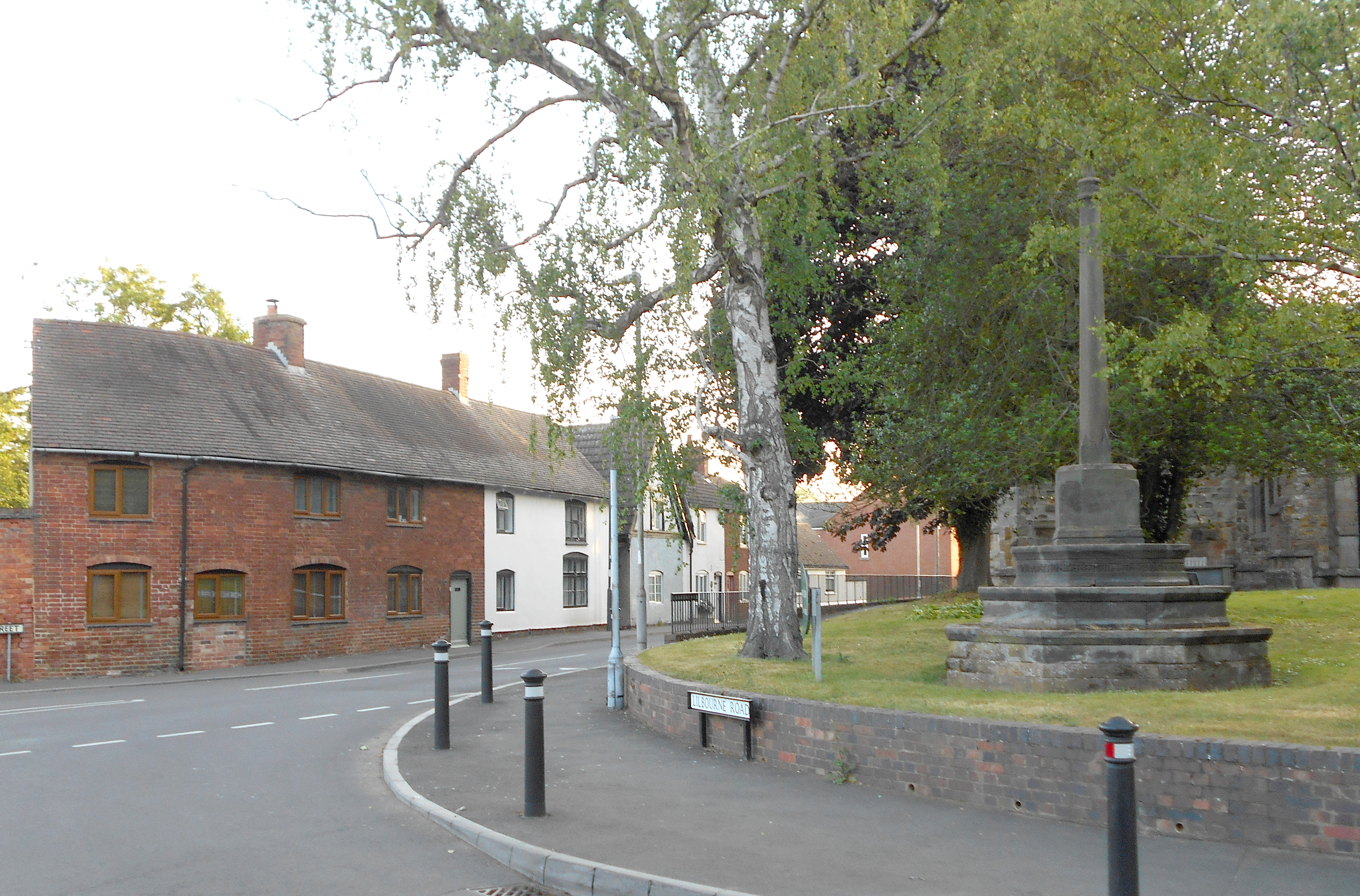
- Looking towards Church Street from Lilbourne Road.

- Location within Warwickshire
- Population: 2,991 (2021)
- OS grid reference: SP529764
- Civil parish: Clifton upon Dunsmore
- District: Rugby
- Shire county: Warwickshire
- Region: West Midlands
- Country: England
- Sovereign state: United Kingdom
- Post town: RUGBY
- Postcode district: CV23
- Dialling code: 01788
- Police: Warwickshire
- Fire: Warwickshire
- Ambulance: West Midlands
- UK Parliament: Rugby

Clifton-upon-Dunsmore is a village and civil parish in the Rugby borough of Warwickshire in England on the north-eastern outskirts of Rugby, approximately 2 miles (3.2 km) from Rugby town centre. The population of the parish taken at the 2011 census was 1,304, increasing to 2,991 at the 2021 census. Clifton is counted as being part of the Rugby built-up area, but is considered separate from the town. The parish also includes the new development of Houlton to the south of the old village, which may account for the large population increase since 2011.

== Location ==
Clifton bears the distinction of being the most easterly village in Warwickshire (and of the entire West Midlands region). The village is located on a fairly steep hill, which at its highest point elevates to 400 feet (120 m) above sea level. The Oxford Canal runs past at the foot of the hill to the south-west. To the north of the village is the River Avon. Around 1.2 miles (1.9 km) north-east of Clifton is Dow Bridge, where the A5 road (Watling Street) crosses the River Avon, and the counties of Warwickshire, Northamptonshire and Leicestershire meet, forming a tripoint.

== History ==
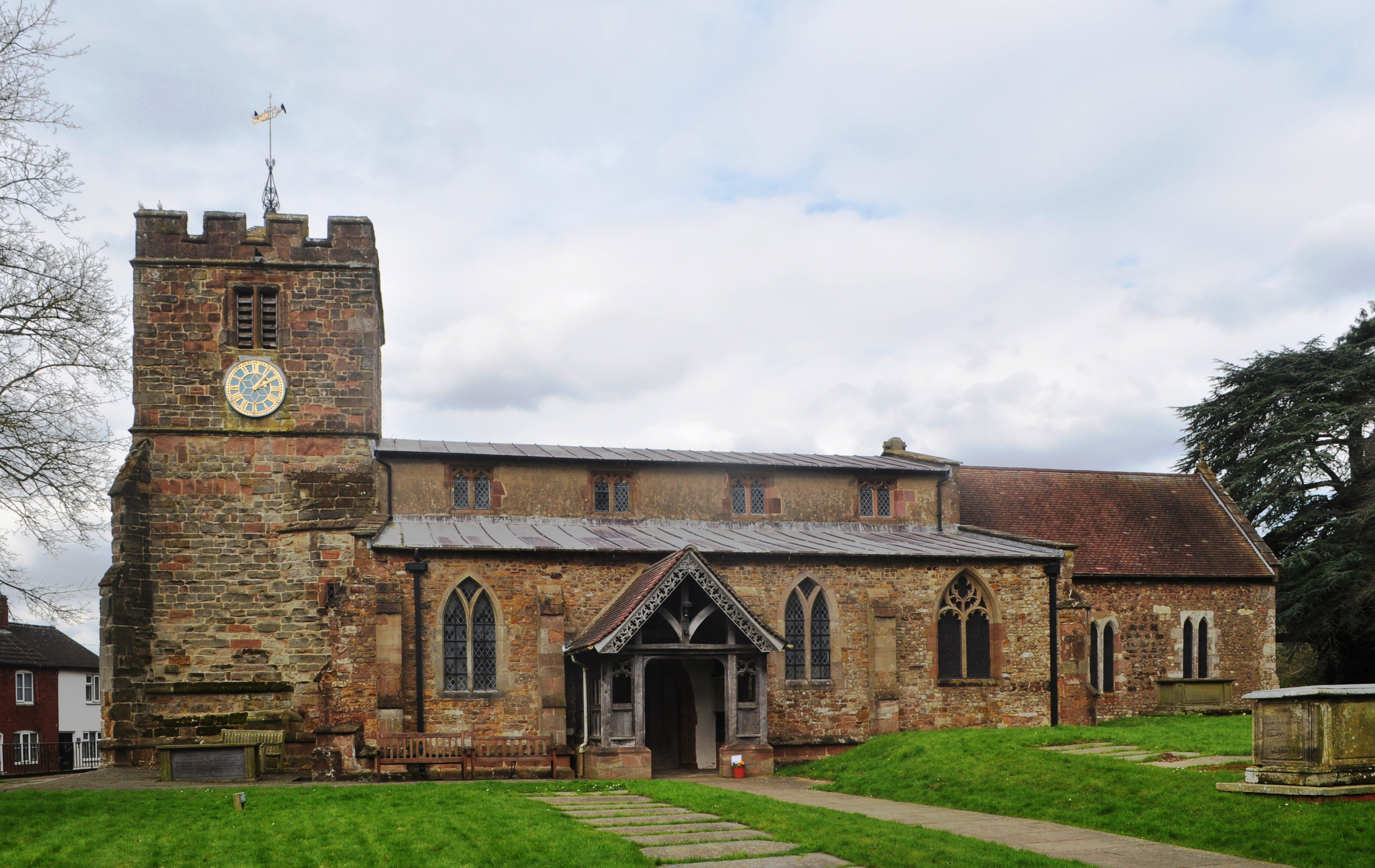
St Mary's Church

The area around Clifton was settled during Roman times; around one and a half miles north of Clifton is the former Roman town of Tripontium. The area around Clifton has been suggested as a possible location of the Defeat of Boudica. The name of the village likely derives from 'Cliffe' in Old English signifying rocky ground, and 'Dunsmore' on top of a hill.

During the time of Edward the Confessor Clifton was in the hands of Alwyn, the Sheriff of Warwick who gave his land at Clifton to Coventry Priory; monks from which were likely responsible for building a church here dedicated to St. Mary, which at the time of the Domesday Book was the mother church to the then smaller settlement of Rugby. That church no longer exists, though the present one (of the same name) dates back to the 13th century, with later additions, including the current tower which was added in the 16th century replacing a spire which had collapsed in a storm. The church is now grade II* listed.

The ancient parish of Clifton included the nearby settlements of Brownsover and Newton; the former is now part of Rugby, and the latter is now a separate civil parish. To the south-east of the village and within the parish was the former Rugby Radio Station, which operated between 1926 and 2007, and is now a large housing development called Houlton.

The village was once served by Clifton Mill railway station on the former Rugby and Stamford Railway. The station opened in 1864, and was closed in 1953, and the line in 1966.

At the village was once Rugby Racecourse, which was used for horse racing from 1862 until 1936. The National Hunt Chase Challenge Cup, now part of the Cheltenham Festival, was held here in 1862.

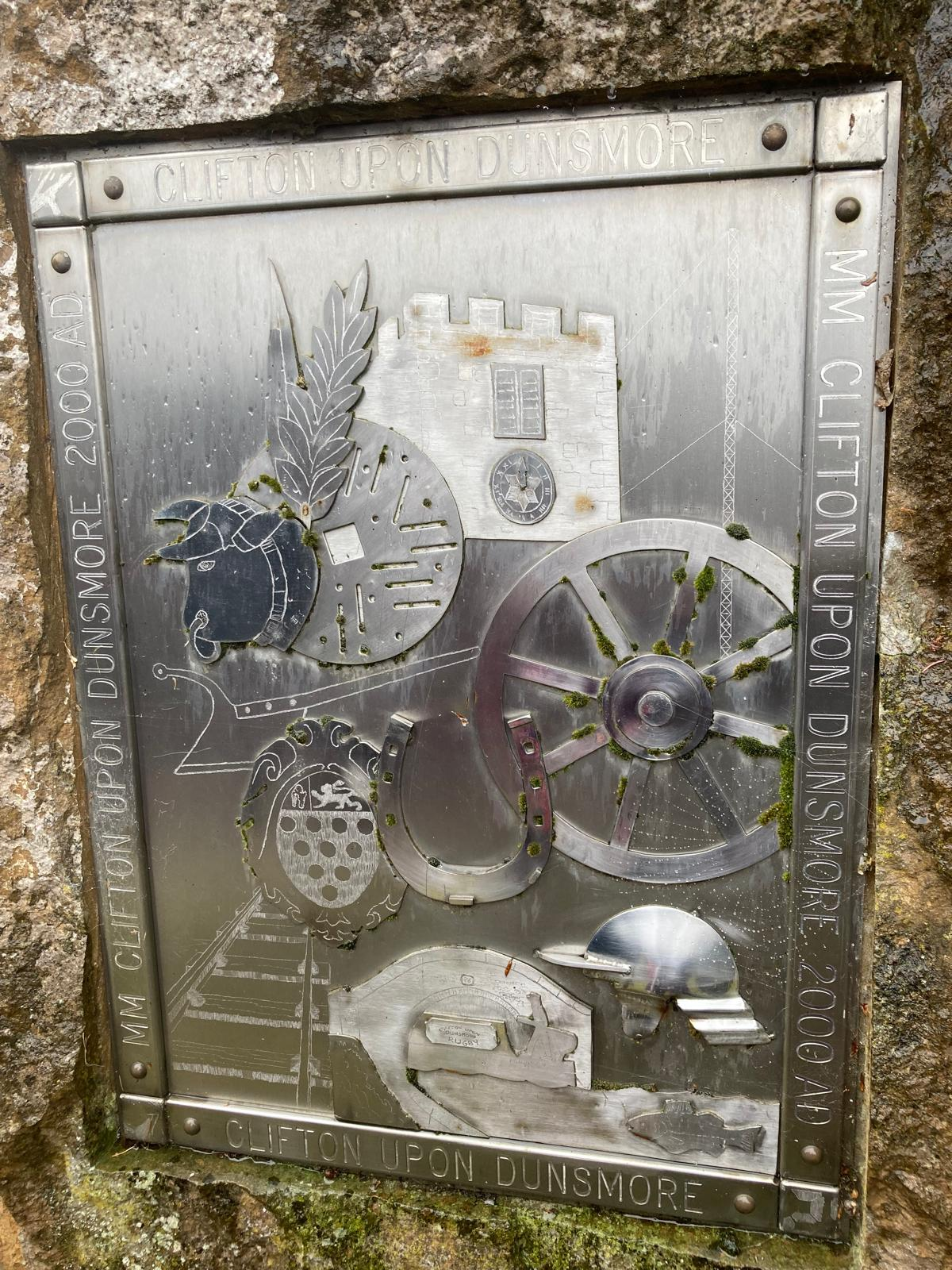
Clifton Plaque crafted in 2000 by Robert Graham

In 2000, for the new millennium, a plaque was created to be placed in Clifton on the corner of North Road and Main Street. A teacher from the local school was tasked to design the plaque. It was crafted by an apprentice sheet metal worker at PAB Rugby, Robert Graham. The plaque was unveiled in mid 2000.

== Commerce ==
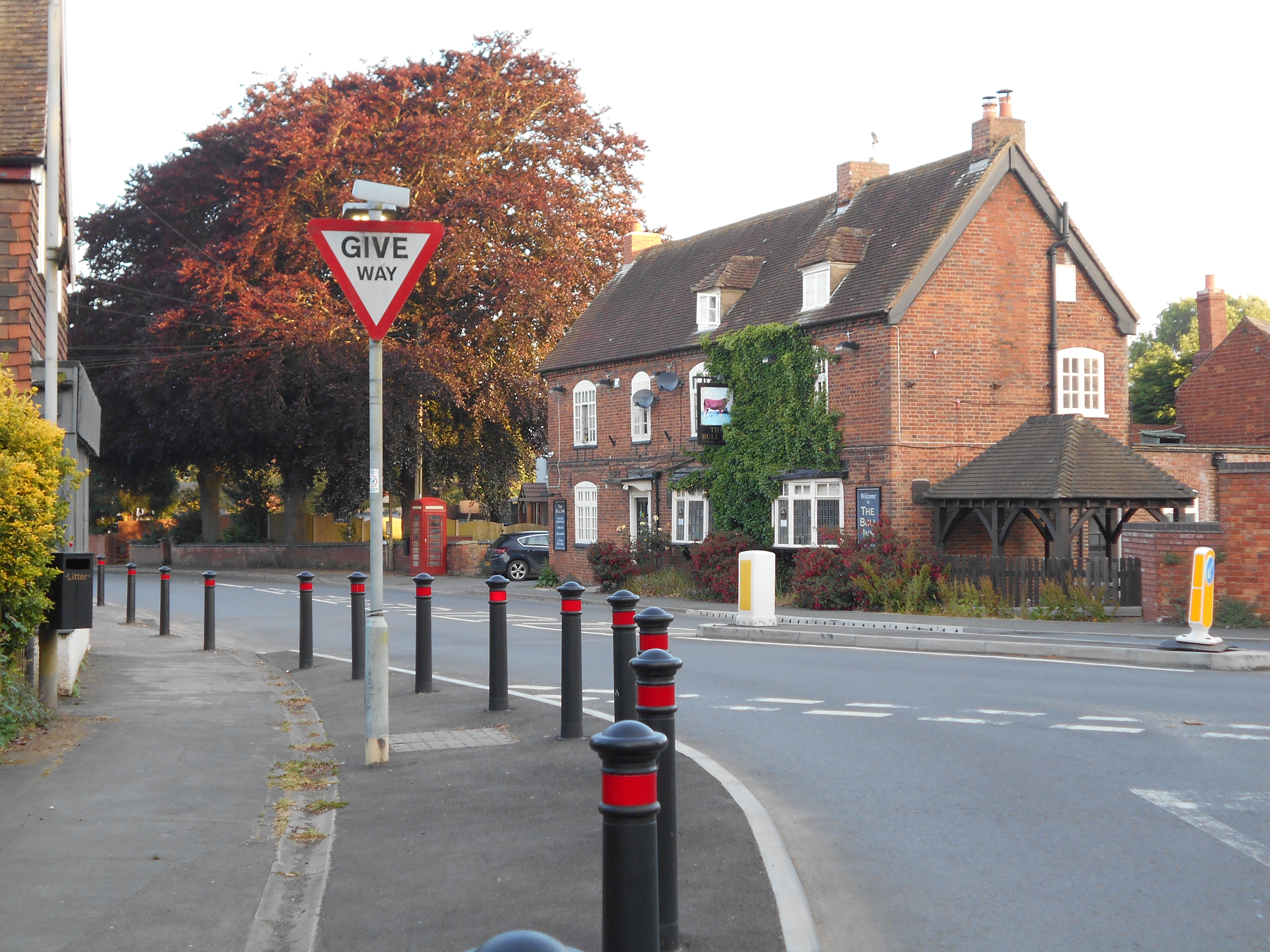
The Bull Inn

In the centre of the village are small shops, St Mary's Church (whose registers for which date back to 1594), and the Bull Inn public house, which was originally a farmhouse, and according to a plaque on the entrance it was built in 1598 and became a public house in 1825. There were rooms for travellers and stables for their horses, some evidence of which still survives. There was formerly a second public house, the Red Lion, which was converted to cottages and the Townsend Memorial Hall in the late 19th century.

Part of the North Oxford Canal also travels within the boundaries of the village, the canal opened in 1790 but during the 1800s they cut 14 miles off its length straightening it to what is now the most navigated part of the canal system in the United Kingdom. Part of the old route subsequently fell into decay, until it was reopened in 2016/2017 by Clifton Wharf where there is a hire fleet based. Clifton Cruisers has been operating from the site at Clifton Wharf since the early 1970s and now has a cafe & bar, The Canal Lounge at Bridge 66. In Houlton The Barn is a community centre/village hall which holds communal classes and clubs and can be hired for parties or events. The Tuning Fork is a restaurant which is open to the public.

== Education ==
The village has a primary school, Clifton-upon-Dunsmore Primary School which has been in continuous use since 1850. Houlton has a primary school named St Gabriel's. Secondary-age pupils attend schools in Rugby or Houlton School which opened in 2021.

== Notable people ==
- Thomas Carte (1686–1754) English historian
- Richard Lindon (1816–1887) Leatherworker, helped develop the modern-day rugby ball.
