= RAF Lilbourne =

Former RAF station in Warwickshire, England

RAF Lilbourne
- Lilbourne, Northamptonshire in England

Site information
- Type: Royal Air Force station
- Owner: The Air Board; Air Ministry
- Operator: Royal Flying Corps; Royal Air Force

Location
- Shown within Northamptonshire RAF Lilbourne (the United Kingdom)
- Coordinates: 52°22′47″N 001°11′40″W

Site history
- Built: 1915
- In use: 1916 - 1920

Airfield information
- Elevation: 98 metres (322 ft) AMSL
Runways
Direction	Length and surface
00/00	Grass
00/00	Grass

RAF Lilbourne is a former Royal Air Force station which was located 5.2 miles (8.4 km) south of Lutterworth, and east of Rugby, England.

The airfield opened 1915 before closing around 1920.

== History ==
A number of training squadrons were based at the airfield including No. 10 Training Squadron using the Avro 504 and the Sopwith Camel at Lilbourne between 7 April 1918 and 25 June 1918, No.44 Reserve/ Training Squadron using the Avro 504, DH4's and Royal Aircraft Factory R.E.7's based at the airfield between 2 November 1916 and 13 November 1916. This also included No. 55 Training Squadron utilising the Avro 504, Camel, Sopwith Pup and the Royal Aircraft Factory S.E.5A. The squadron used both Castle Bromwich Aerodrome and Lilbourne between 15 January 1918 and July 1918.

The airfield was also home to a number of operational squadrons during World War I including No. 55 Squadron RFC using Avro 504's, B.E.2's, DH4's and FK8's spread between Castle Bromwich Aerodrome and Lilbourne from 27 April 1916 and 6 March 1917, No. 73 Squadron RFC using the Camel while based at the airfield between 10 July 1917 and 9 January 1918 and No. 84 Squadron RFC using the Avro 504, Camel and Pup at Lilbourne between 23 March 1917 and 23 September 1917.

== Accidents and incidents ==
Date	Incident	Reference
25 July 1916	B.E.2d, serial 5838, of 55 Squadron crashed	
9 June 1917	Avro 504, serial 2923, of 73 Squadron, crashed in a spin at Lilbourne	
10 August 1917	Sopwith Pup, serial A7326, of 84 Squadron spun into the ground at Lilbourne after a wing collapsed	
7 December 1917	Sopwith Camel, serial B5577, of 73 Squadron stalled on a turn at Lilbourne after the engine was choked	
22 January 1918	Bristol F.2 Fighter, serial B1236, of 59 Training Squadron crashed near Lilbourne after its pilot was thrown out during aerobatic practice	
24 March 1918	Sopwith Pup, serial B7530, of 55 Training Squadron spun into the ground near Lilbourne.	

== Current use ==
The Rugby Radio Station was opened in 1926, and by the 1950s it was the largest transmitting station in the world, occupying sixteen hundred acres on and around the former RAF Lilbourne. The radio masts and station were demolished between 2003 and 2007, and the land is now developed as Houlton village. The old radio station building is now Houlton School, there is a large lorry park on part of the airfield.
