= Three Shire Stone =

A Three Shire Stone is a monument marking the point where three English shires meet. Notable examples include:

- Three Shire Stone (Lake District) – Cumberland/Lancashire/Westmorland
- Three Shire Stones (Bath and North East Somerset) – Somerset/Gloucestershire/Wiltshire

== See also ==
- Tripoint, a point where three counties (or other geographical entities) meet
- List of tripoints of counties of England, listing ceremonial and historic county tripoints
- Three-Farthing Stone in The Shire of J. R. R. Tolkien's legendarium
- Quadripoint, a point where four counties (or other geographical entities) meet
- Four Shire Stone, where Worcestershire, Warwickshire, Oxfordshire and Gloucestershire once met
