= Hillmorton =

Suburb of Rugby, Warwickshire, England

Coordinates: 52.358781°N 1.223288°W

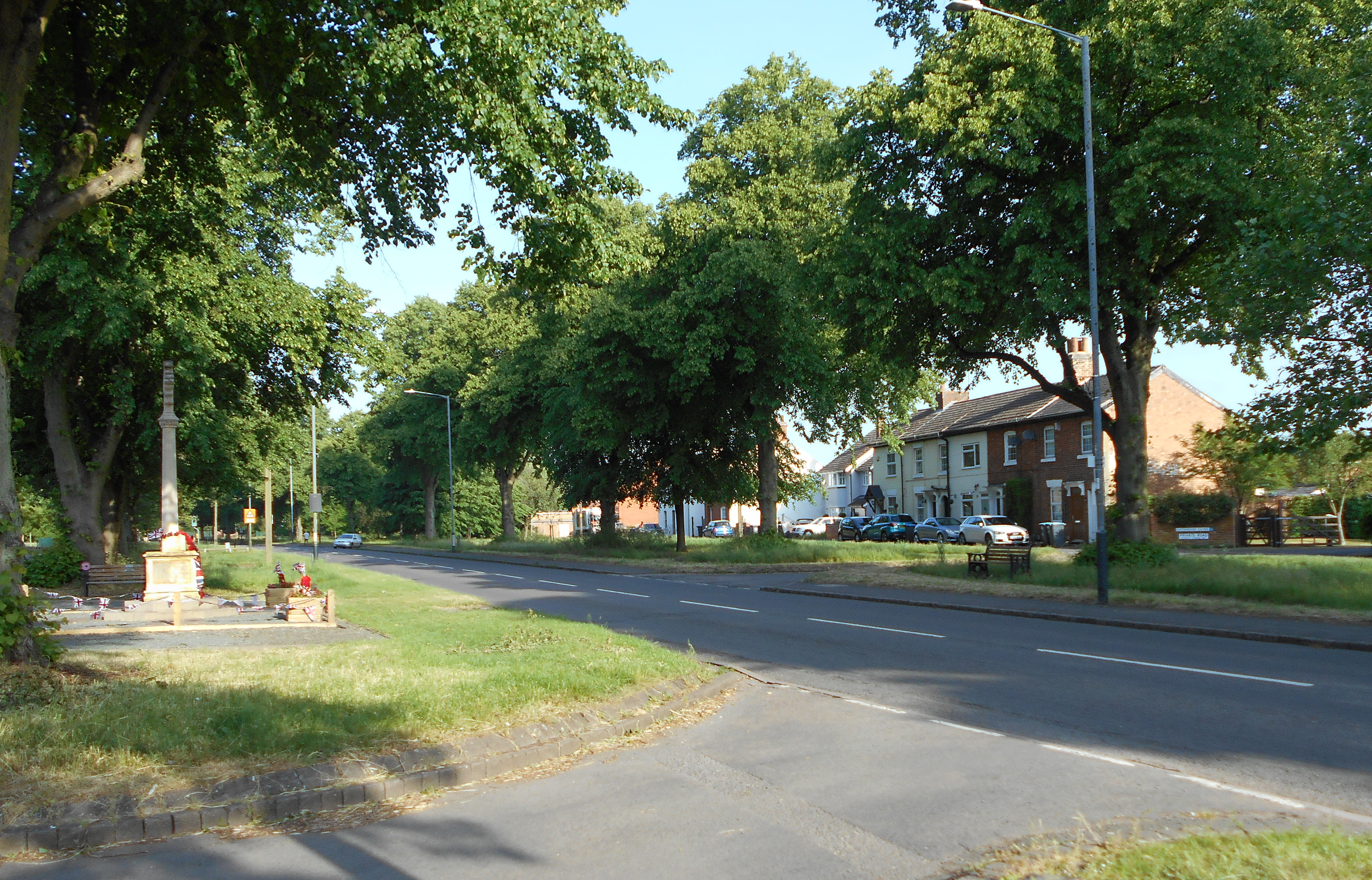
- Old village green, High Street, in upper Hillmorton

- Location within Warwickshire
- Population: 5,276 (Ward 2011 census)
- District: Rugby
- Shire county: Warwickshire
- Region: West Midlands
- Country: England
- Sovereign state: United Kingdom
- Post town: RUGBY
- Postcode district: CV21, CV22
- Dialling code: 01788
- Police: Warwickshire
- Fire: Warwickshire
- Ambulance: West Midlands
- UK Parliament: Rugby

Hillmorton is a suburb of Rugby, Warwickshire, England, around 2 miles (3.2 km) south-east of Rugby town centre, forming much of the eastern half of the town. It is also a ward of the Borough of Rugby. Hillmorton was historically a village in its own right, but was incorporated into Rugby in 1932. Hillmorton also encompasses the Paddox housing estate to the west of the old village, which is shown on many maps as 'Hillmorton Paddox', this area however is part of a separate ward called 'Paddox'.

== History ==
Settlements in the Hillmorton area spread into the prehistoric era. Archaeological digs at near Ashlawn Road in 2017 found remains of human settlement dating back to the Bronze Age (1000 – 500 BC), as well as numerous finds of occupation from the Roman period, including items of pottery and the remains of pottery or tile kilns.

Before Rugby spread to the east, Hillmorton was a village. The village was formed by amalgamation of two settlements: Hull and Morton: The former being the part on high ground, the latter being the part on lower ground to the north where the church of St. John the Baptist stands, and where the canal runs through. Morton was mentioned in the Domesday Book as land that in 1066 before the invasion of William the Conqueror included portions belonging to Waltheof (of Hillmorton), to Viking (of Barcheston) and to Grimkel and Swein; by 1096 the parish was in the ancient hundred of Marton and had been partitioned between new Tenants-in-chief: the Count of Meulan who enfeuded Waltheof's portion, Richard the Forester who possessed Viking's portion, and Hugh de Grandmesnil who possessed Grimkel and Swein's land. In the 12th century the Domesday hundreds of Meretone (Marton), Bomelau (Bumbelowe) and Stanlei were combined, so Hillmorton was in the Rugby subdivision of Knightlow Hundred. To this day, a division exists between the upper and lower parts of the old village.

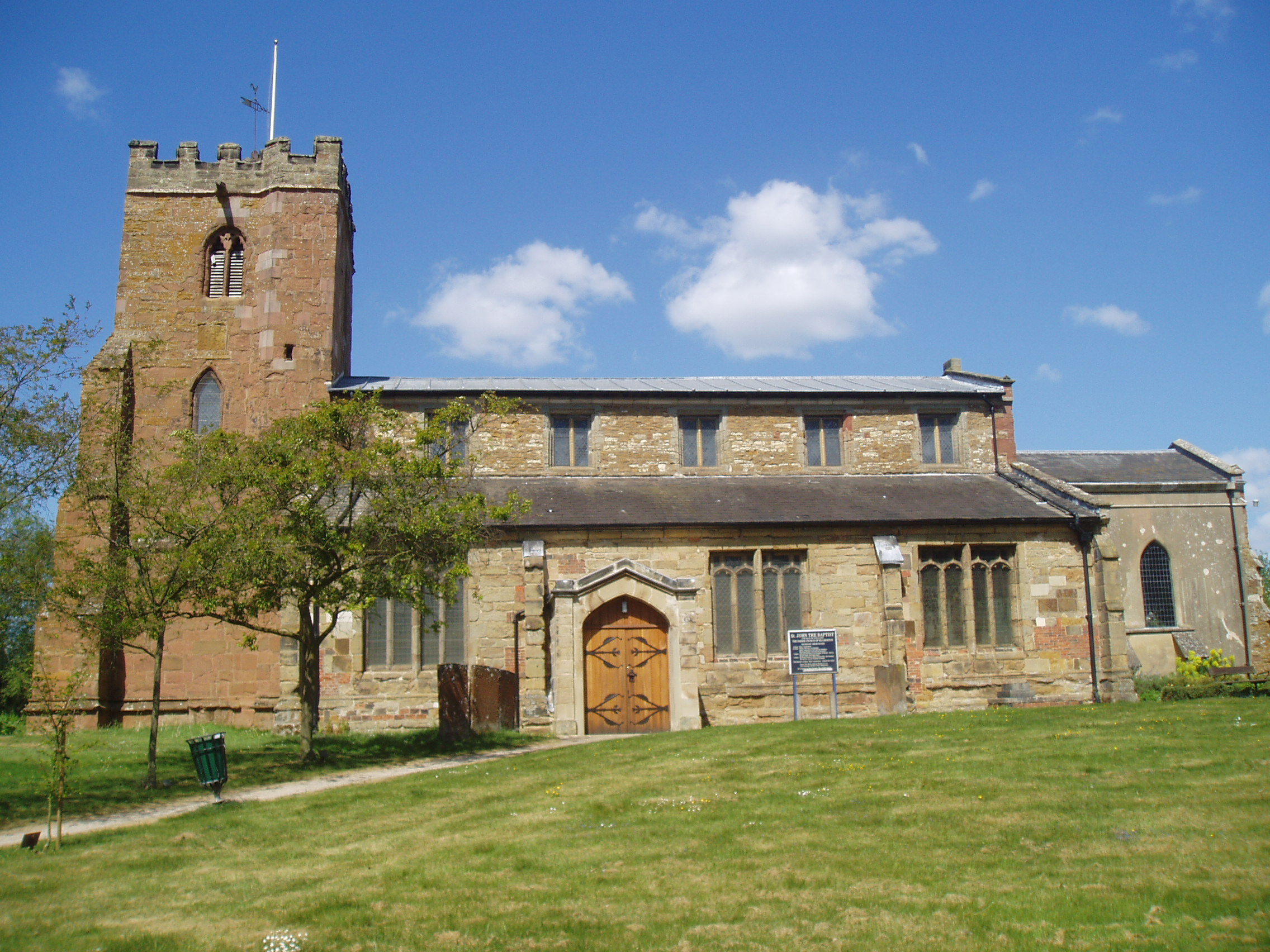
Church of St.John the Baptist at Hillmorton.

The church of Saint John the Baptist in lower Hillmorton is the oldest building in the locality, with the oldest parts dating from the 13th Century. It is now grade II* listed.

The main road between Coventry and Northampton (now the A428 road) runs through upper Hillmorton, and at one time a market was held there. The market began in 1265 when a charter was granted to Thomas de Astley, ancestor of the Barons Astley. He and his wife are buried in the churchyard; some Perkins descendants are buried within the church.

The market at Hillmorton was originally more important than that of nearby Rugby, but it diminished and was abandoned by the mid 17th century. The old village green still exists, upon which is the remains of a 14th-century stone market cross which is grade II listed.

In 1607 Hillmorton was involved in the Midland Revolt against enclosures, when some 3,000 people gathered at the village to proclaim the manifesto of the 'Diggers of Warwickshire'.

The Oxford Canal was built around Hillmorton in the 1770s, where a flight of three locks known as 'Hillmorton Locks' was constructed (see below). Later the London and Birmingham Railway was constructed around Hillmorton in the 1830s. Hillmorton gives its name to Hillmorton Junction, where the direct line from Rugby to London (the West Coast Main Line) diverges from the Northampton Loop Line.

Suburban expansion of Hillmorton westwards began in 1912 when land was sold off west of the village for the construction of the large Paddox housing estate, the development of which continued until the late-1930s. This development linked Hillmorton with Rugby. In 1931 the parish had a population of 3786. In 1932 Hillmorton was formally incorporated into Rugby, when the civil parish was abolished and most of its area absorbed into the Rugby municipal borough, the remainder went to Clifton-upon-Dunsmore.

Most of Hillmorton consists of 20th century housing estates, although some older buildings survive around the older parts of the village.

To the east of Hillmorton was the former Rugby Radio Station, which opened in 1926, and contained radio masts 820 feet (250 m) high. For many years this was a major landmark, until 2007, when the last masts were demolished. The site is now used as a large housing development called Houlton.

== Hillmorton Locks ==
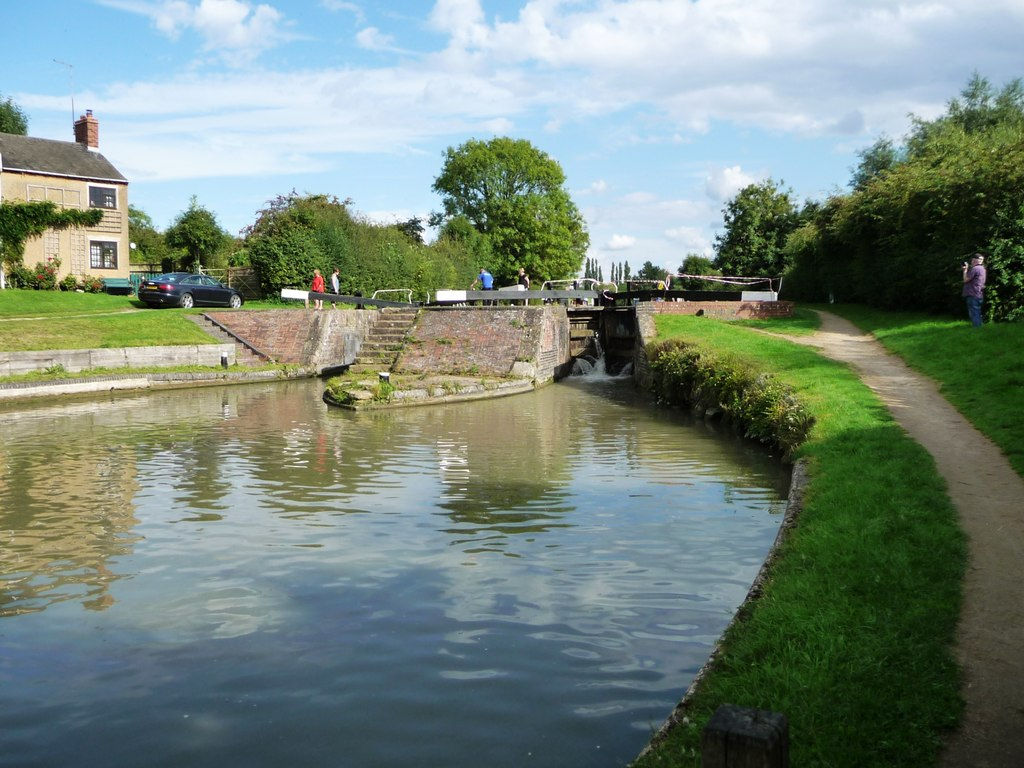
Hillmorton middle locks in 2017.

Hillmorton is possibly most well known for its flight of canal locks on the Oxford Canal. The Hillmorton locks are consistently the busiest flight of locks on the national canal network. In 2019, 9,000 boats passed through the locks. They consist of three pairs of parallel twinned locks. They were originally built as single locks during 1769-74, but additional twin locks were added in 1840, in order to relieve congestion. At this time, the canal was extremely busy with working canal boats, and the locks were considerably busier than today; in 1842, 20,859 boats were recorded as passing through the locks. The bottom locks are Grade II listed.

Today the area around the locks is a conservation area, which is semi-separate from the rest of Hillmorton. A small community is based alongside the locks, along with a small industrial area, which contains a number of mostly canal related businesses and workshops.

== Amenities ==
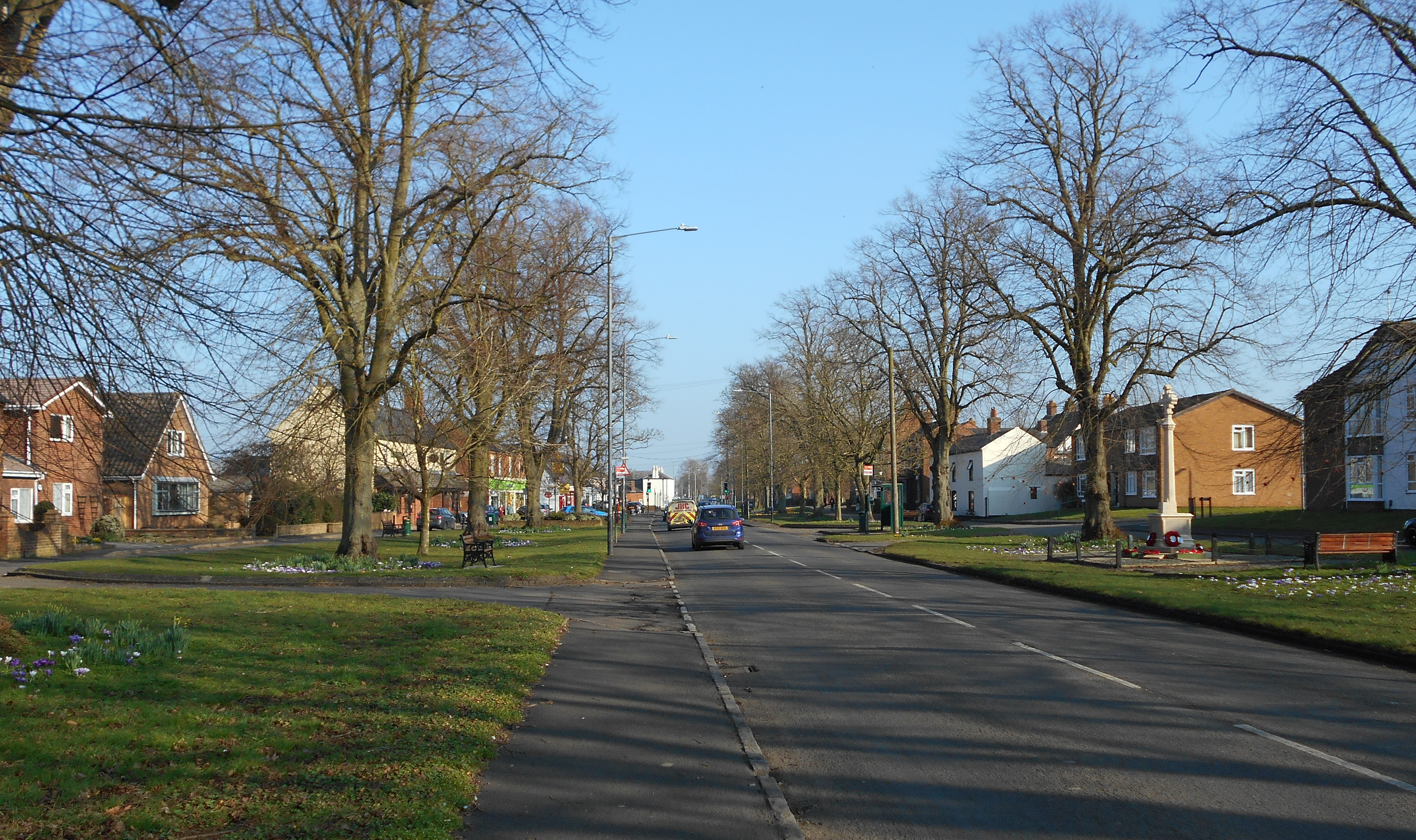
Hillmorton High Street, looking west

A small shopping area is located on High Street in upper Hillmorton, which includes a number of shops and businesses, including a Co-Op supermarket, and a post office.

=== Education ===
Several schools for primary age children are located in the area including Hillmorton Primary School, Abbots Farm Junior School, English Martyrs Catholic Primary School, and Paddox Primary School.

The main secondary school serving the area is Ashlawn School, which originally opened in 1958 as Dunsmore School. It lies on Ashlawn Road.

== Notable people ==
Hillmorton is the ancestral home of a U.S. president, James Garfield, his ancestor, Edward Garfield (1583-1672), having emigrated to America in around 1630.

Mary Bradbury (Nee, Perkins) (1615 - 1700) was born in Hillmorton. She emigrated to colonial America, married Captain Thomas Bradbury and lived in Salisbury, Massachusetts where she was accused and convicted of witchcraft in 1692. She escaped punishment.

The botanist James Petiver (c. 1665–1718) was born in Hillmorton.

During the Second World War, Hillmorton was home to a notorious character, Unity Mitford; socialite and close friend of Adolf Hitler, following her return to Britain following a suicide attempt. She stayed with a local vicar and his family under close supervision. According to local legend, her presence in the area was a reason why Rugby was not bombed substantially by the Germans during the war.

The TV antiques expert David Barby had a business in Hillmorton and lived locally.

== Gallery ==
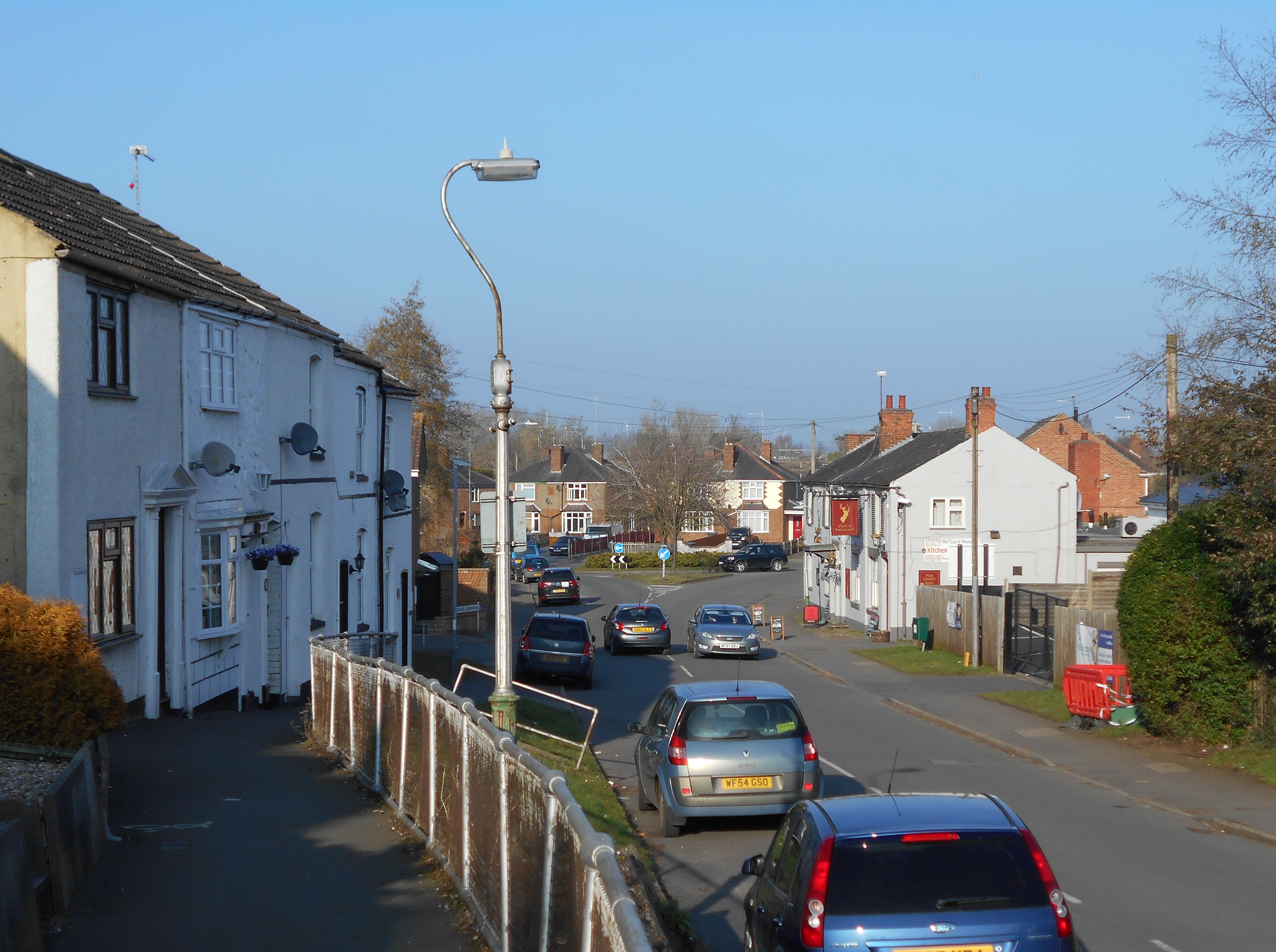
School Street, lower Hillmorton

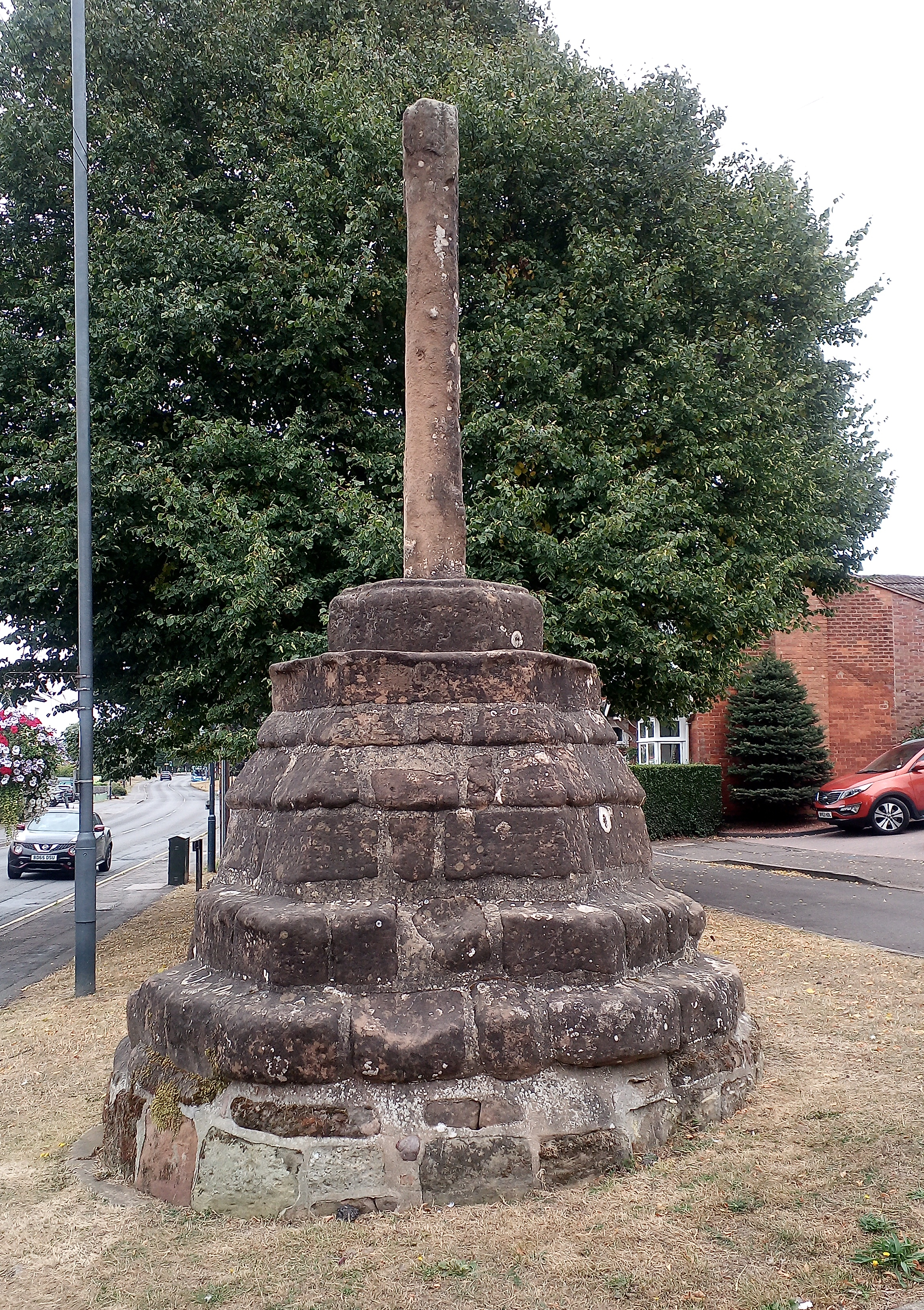
14th century market cross remains, alongside High Street, upper Hillmorton

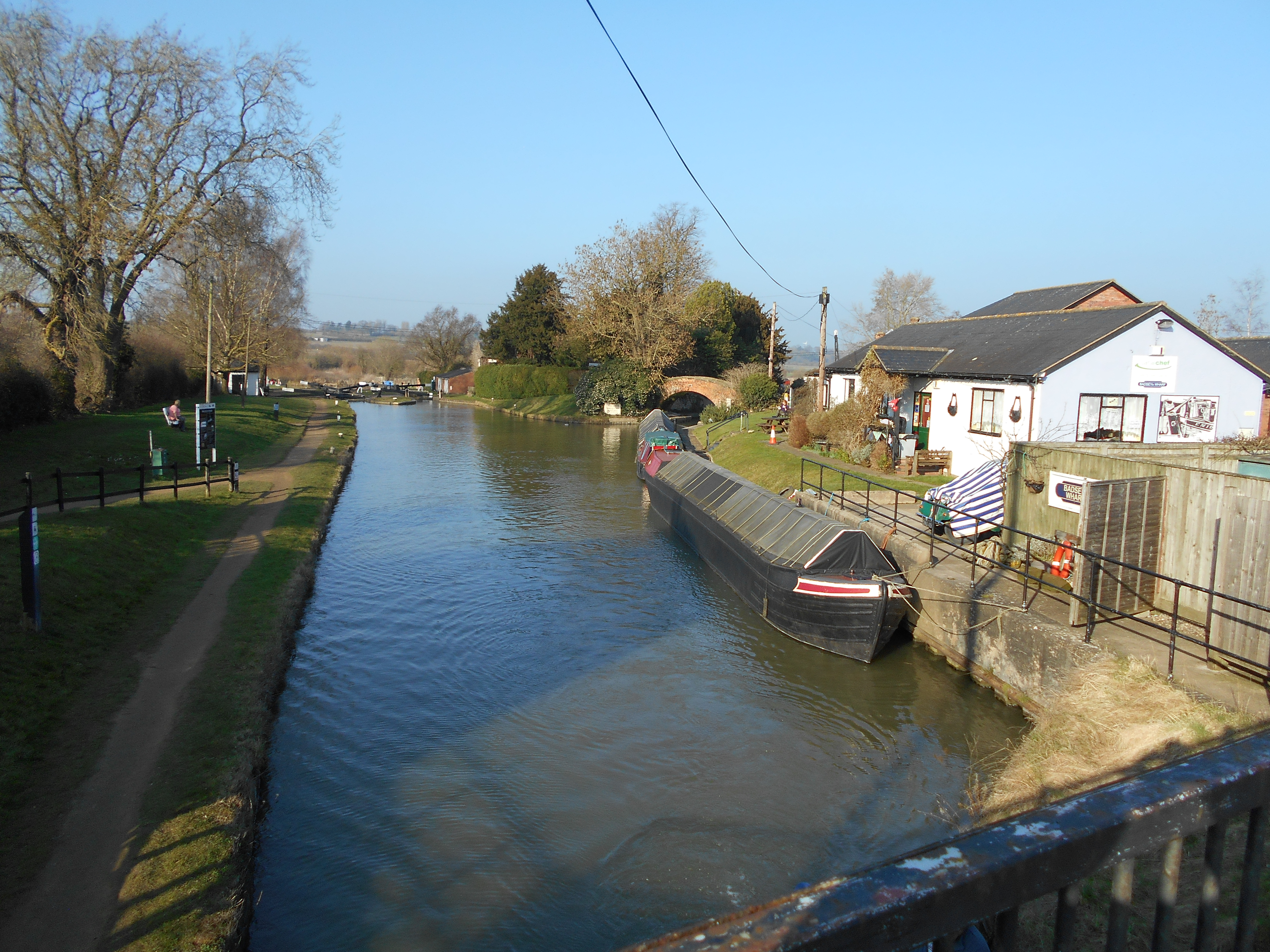
Oxford Canal at Hillmorton
