= Dow Bridge =

Coordinates: 52.396599°N 1.202795°W

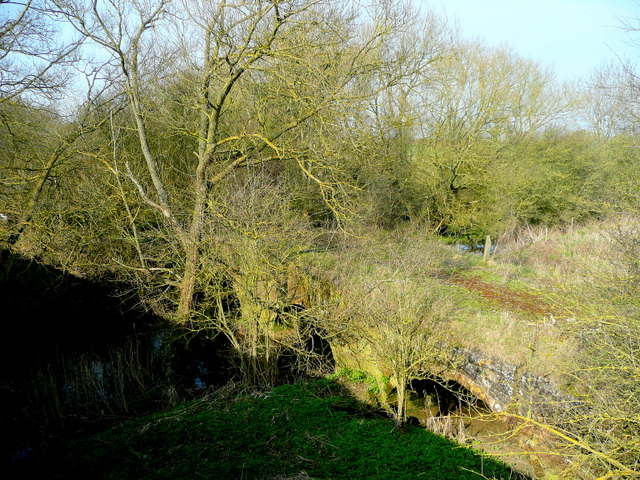
Old Dow Bridge from the New Dow Bridge

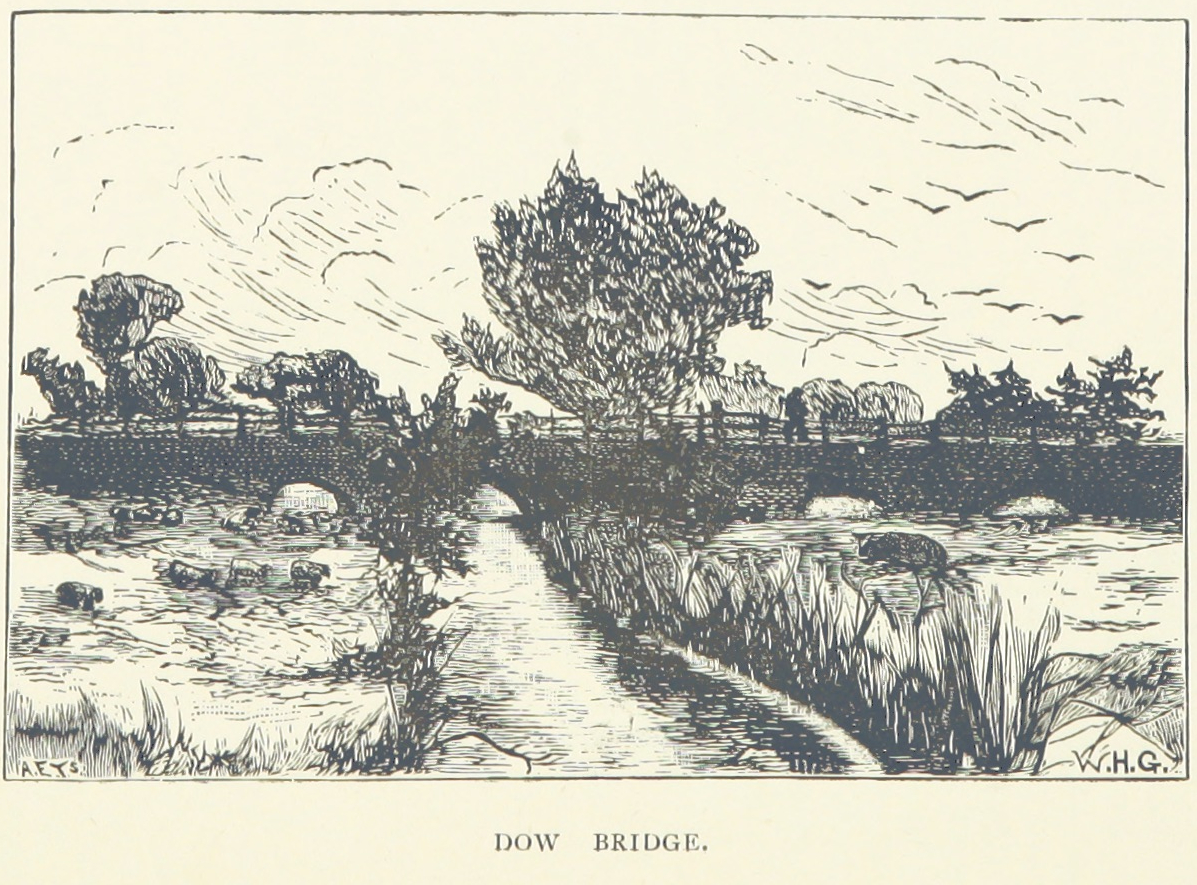
1890s drawing of Dow Bridge

Dow Bridge is a location in the English Midlands where the A5 road (the former Roman Watling Street) crosses the River Avon. It is the point where the three counties of Warwickshire, Leicestershire and Northamptonshire meet, forming a tripoint.

A bridge has existed at the location since Roman times. The 16th-century antiquary John Leland wrote 'Where this bridge is there were two smaller ones, the wider for carriages, the lesser, evidently Roman, for foot passengers and horses.' The site was for centuries believed to have been the location of the Roman town of Tripontium, however this was later discovered around a mile to the north. The bridge was rebuilt in around 1776 by the Road Commissioners, consisting of five brick arches and was again rebuilt in 1838, incorporating parts of the earlier bridge. On this bridge was a stone called the 'Three Shires Stone' marking the junction of the three counties. This bridge became Grade II listed in 1990. It is now disused having been replaced by a modern road bridge to the west which was built in the 1930s.

It lies close to the Warwickshire villages of Newton and Clifton-upon-Dunsmore (the bridge being in the parish of the former), the Leicestershire village of Catthorpe and the Northamptonshire village of Lilbourne.

== See also ==
- No Man's Heath, Warwickshire, meeting point of Leicestershire, Warwickshire, and Staffordshire.
- Four Shire Stone, meeting point of Warwickshire, Oxfordshire and Gloucestershire (formerly also Worcestershire)
