= Greenhaven Woodland Burial Ground =

Burial ground in Warwickshire, England

Coordinates: 52.386°N 1.161°W

Greenhaven Woodland Burial Ground is a natural burial ground located in the village of Lilbourne, 5 miles (8 km) from the town of Rugby, England. It opened in 1994 and was the first privately owned natural burial ground in the country. Greenhaven is situated on 14 acres (57,000 m^{2}) of former agricultural land and originally catered for approximately 7,000 plots, but as of 8 December 2008, roughly 5,000 of these remain.

== Greenhaven’s philosophy ==
In order to maintain as close to a natural environment as possible, Greenhaven:

- Has replaced the use of gravestones with trees. The tree type can be picked from a list of trees native to the local area. The selection of available trees has since been limited in order to avoid a selection bias and to ensure a mixture analogous to the surrounding countryside of Northamptonshire. These currently include ash, oak, alder, crab apple, willow, silver birch, wild cherry, blackthorn, buckthorn, dogwood, field maple, hawthorn, midland hawthorn, hazel, spindle, wayfaring, guelder rose, rowan, holly and aspen.
- Requires that at the time of burial, the body shall be contained in clothes, wrappings or a shroud made of natural cloths and materials.
- Provides a variety of biodegradable coffins which contain no metal or plastic.
- Forbids the decoration of graves with ornaments, toys or any non-biodegradable objects.

The burial ground has no specific religious ties.

== Media and awards ==
On 21 January 2005, Greenhaven director Nicholas Hargreaves took part in an interview about green burials for the BBC Radio 4 programme Changing Places: Pushing Up The Daisies. The burial ground also featured in The Breakfast Club show for BBC Radio Coventry and Warwickshire on 24 March 2006. In April 2000, Greenhaven won The New Natural Death Handbook Award 2000 for the Best Nature Reserve Ground in the UK. More recently, the burial ground was a finalist in the UK Cemetery of the Year Awards 2008.

== The Future of Greenhaven ==
It is hoped that the site will be completely wooded by 2060 and passed over to a wildlife trust who will maintain it as a natural ecosystem.

== See also ==
- Natural burial
