= Evenlode =

Village in Gloucestershire, England

Coordinates: 51.961°N 1.669°W

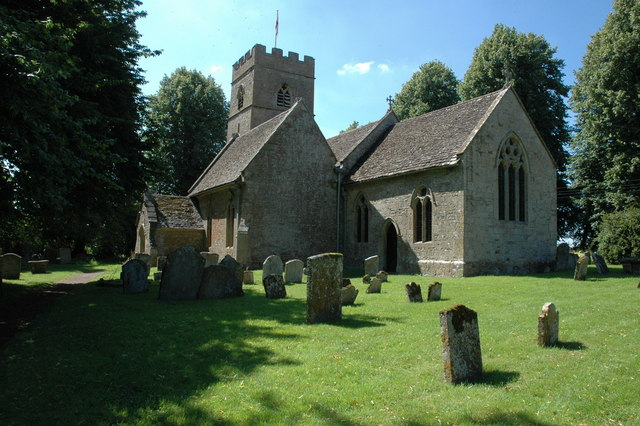
- Evenlode Church

- Location within Gloucestershire
- Population: 150 (2016 est.)
- OS grid reference: SP23003000
- Civil parish: Evenlode
- District: Cotswold
- Shire county: Gloucestershire
- Region: South West
- Country: England
- Sovereign state: United Kingdom
- Post town: Moreton-in-Marsh
- Postcode district: GL56
- Police: Gloucestershire
- Fire: Gloucestershire
- Ambulance: South Western
- UK Parliament: North Cotswolds
- Website: https://evenlodeparishcouncil.wordpress.com/

Evenlode is a village and civil parish (ONS Code 23UC051) in the Cotswold District of eastern Gloucestershire in England. Evenlode is bordered by the Gloucestershire parishes of Moreton-in-Marsh to the northwest, Longborough and Donnington to the west, Broadwell to the southwest, and Adlestrop to the southeast; and by the Oxfordshire parish of Chastleton to the east. At Evenlode's northern tip is the Four shire stone, whose name reflects the parish's status as part of Worcestershire until 1931; here at a point between Moreton-in-Marsh and Chastleton are the Warwickshire parishes of Little Compton and Great Wolford, as well as Batsford in Gloucestershire. At its southern tip, between Broadwell and Adlestrop, Evenlode meets the parish of Oddington at a point.

== History ==
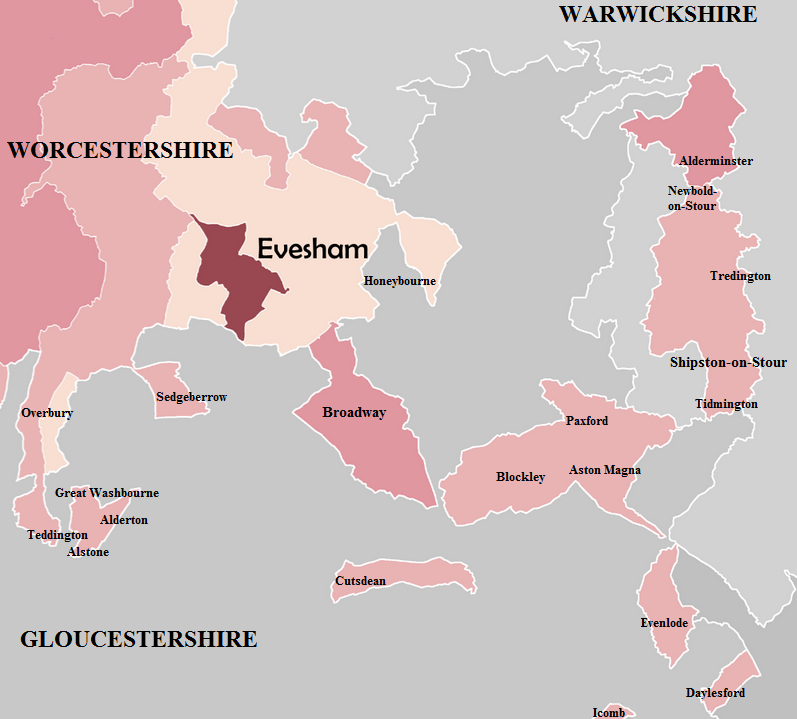
This map shows pre-1931 Worcestershire in shades of red/pink. Evenlode is northwest of Daylesford in the southeast corner.

The parish was granted before the 10th century to Worcester Priory, latterly as part of the manor of Blockley; the priory's scattered lands formed many of the detached parts of the County of Worcester. The Church of St Edward King & Martyr in Evenlode is a Grade II* Listed Building built in the 12th century and restored in 1879. It is a Church of England parish church in the Diocese of Gloucester, with an average attendance of 20 at Sunday service in 2015.

Until 1931 it was a detached part of Worcestershire, in the hundred of Oswaldslow, southeast of the main body of the county. The River Evenlode, which shares its name, forms the parish's western boundary.
