= Ashlawn School =

Bilateral school in Rugby, Warwickshire, England

Location
- Ashlawn Road; Rugby, Warwickshire, CV22 5ET; England
- Coordinates: 52°21′26″N 1°13′52″W

Information
- Type: Bilateral school; Academy
- Motto: Per Scientiam
- Established: 1952 (formerly Dunsmore School)
- Founder: Kathleen Hughes (Headteacher)
- Local authority: Warwickshire
- Trust: TLET
- Department for Education URN: 136587 Tables
- Ofsted: Reports
- Principal: Paul Brockwell
- Staff: Around 110 members
- Gender: Coeducational
- Age: 11 to 18
- Enrolment: 1,827
- Colour: Years 7–9 – maroon Years 10–11 – black Years 7–11 PE – blue Sixth form – smart office wear
- Website: http://www.ashlawn.org.uk

Ashlawn School (or simply Ashlawn), is a large partially selective secondary school located in the Hillmorton area of Rugby, Warwickshire, England that specialises in science, computing and leadership. It is one of only five bilateral schools in England for students aged 11–18. Ashlawn is a member of the Transforming Lives Educational Trust (TLET) family of schools.

Ashlawn School was formerly a National Teaching School. It was granted this status in October 2014. These schools were judged to be 'outstanding' by Ofsted. This function has since transferred to the Transforming Lives Educational Trust's Education Improvement Service, who offer Initial Teacher Education for trainee teachers.

In both November 2007 and November 2013, the school was awarded an Ofsted Outstanding rating (the highest rating). Siobhan Evans took over as Principal in January 2019 and inspectors visited again four years later in November 2022. This report awarded the school an Ofsted Inadequate rating (the lowest possible rating).

Ashlawn's 2022 report placed the number of pupils at 1,827, with 398 of those being students in the sixth form.

== History ==
=== Foundation ===
Ashlawn School opened its doors in 1952, under the name of Dunsmore School for Girls. The headmistress at the time was Miss Kathleen Hughes, and the school site still stands as Ashlawn’s ‘west’ site. Shortly after, in 1958, Dunsmore School for Boys opened, which was the present ‘east’ site of the school. The headmaster of the boys’ school was Mr Frank Hodgson. The two schools, along with Fareham High School (on Fareham Avenue, Hillmorton) merged to form today’s Ashlawn School in 1985.

=== Headteachers ===
- 1952–1985 (DsG) – Kathleen Hughes
- 1958–1975 (DsB) – Frank Hodgson
- 1975–1985 (DsB) – Eric Needham
- 1985–2008 (Ashlawn) – Peter Rossborough
- 2008– 2018 (Ashlawn) – Lois Reed

=== Principals ===
- 2019–2022 (Ashlawn) – Siobhan Evans
- 2023– Present (Ashlawn) – Paul Brockwell

=== Recent history ===
In 2005 the school was granted Special Science College status, entitling the establishment to government grants for new educational equipment, such as portable tablets with internet access. These are linked to data projectors so that presentations and research can be done online and easily in front of a class. In April 2009 it was also awarded Leadership College status. Both achievements have been commemorated with the construction of monuments: a rainbow coloured piece of modern art (created by a local artist), for the Science College status; and a large text embossed sun, for the Leadership status.

In early 2007 the school received planning permission from Rugby Borough Council to erect a wind turbine at the school. In 2010, a number of Ashlawn's buildings were fitted with solar panels.

In October 2012, work began on a new bespoke expressive arts centre which was completed in mid-2013. The centre is now available out of hours (e.g. the dance studio, drama rooms) marking the school's first building partially dedicated for use by the local community. The building was officially unveiled by Rugby Mayor Cllr Tony Gillias on 20 June 2013, ready for use in the upcoming autumn term.

In April 2015, the Education Funding Agency awarded Ashlawn School with £2.6 million to build a bespoke Sixth Form Centre and specialist Teaching Studio. This was in response to a significant increase in demand for places at this school.

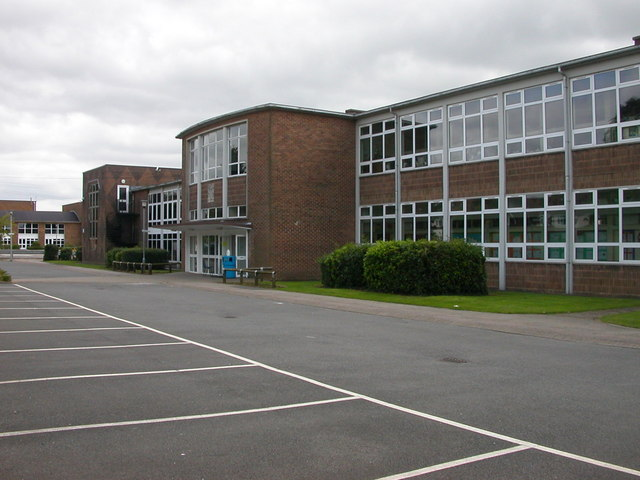
School building

In January 2016, Ashlawn School was listed as one of the UK's best state schools in the Tatler Magazine, based on GCSE and A level results.

On 3 January 2023, James Higham, the CEO of TLET wrote to parents to announce Mrs Evans, the Principal, made the decision to leave the role with immediate effect. Paul Brockwell joined the school on an interim basis in the role of Associate Principal.

On 25 January 2023, Ofsted published their official report and downgraded Ashlawn School from Outstanding to Inadequate in its inspection of November 2022. The report cited several serious weaknesses including behaviour and attitudes, lack of courtesy and respect and the culture of the school. The provision for pupils with SEND was also cited as requiring improvement.

=== Academy status ===
In May 2010, the secretary of education approached the school to become an Academy. On 1 April 2011 the school took on the Academy status and is now a member of the Transforming Lives Educational Trust family of schools, which also operates Henry Hinde Infant School (Converter Academy), Henry Hinde Junior School (Sponsored Academy) and Houlton School (Independent Free School).

=== Headteacher pay ===
In 2018, Headteacher Lois Reed, also the chief executive of the Transforming Lives Education Trust, which ran two other schools at the time, received, a pay increase of around £50,000, bringing her salary to between £270,000 and £280,000. David Gadsby, chair of the Ashlawn School Governing Body defended the pay rise, others in the community said it was "obscene""ridiculous" and some teachers calling it "pure greed".

Following Reed's resignation, The Transforming Lives Educational Trust confirmed that Siobhan Evans would be joining Ashlawn from January 2019.

== Notable alumni ==
- Lauren Taylor – professional golfer
- Michael John Harrison – author and critic
