= Rugby Radio Station =

British government radio transmission facility

Rugby
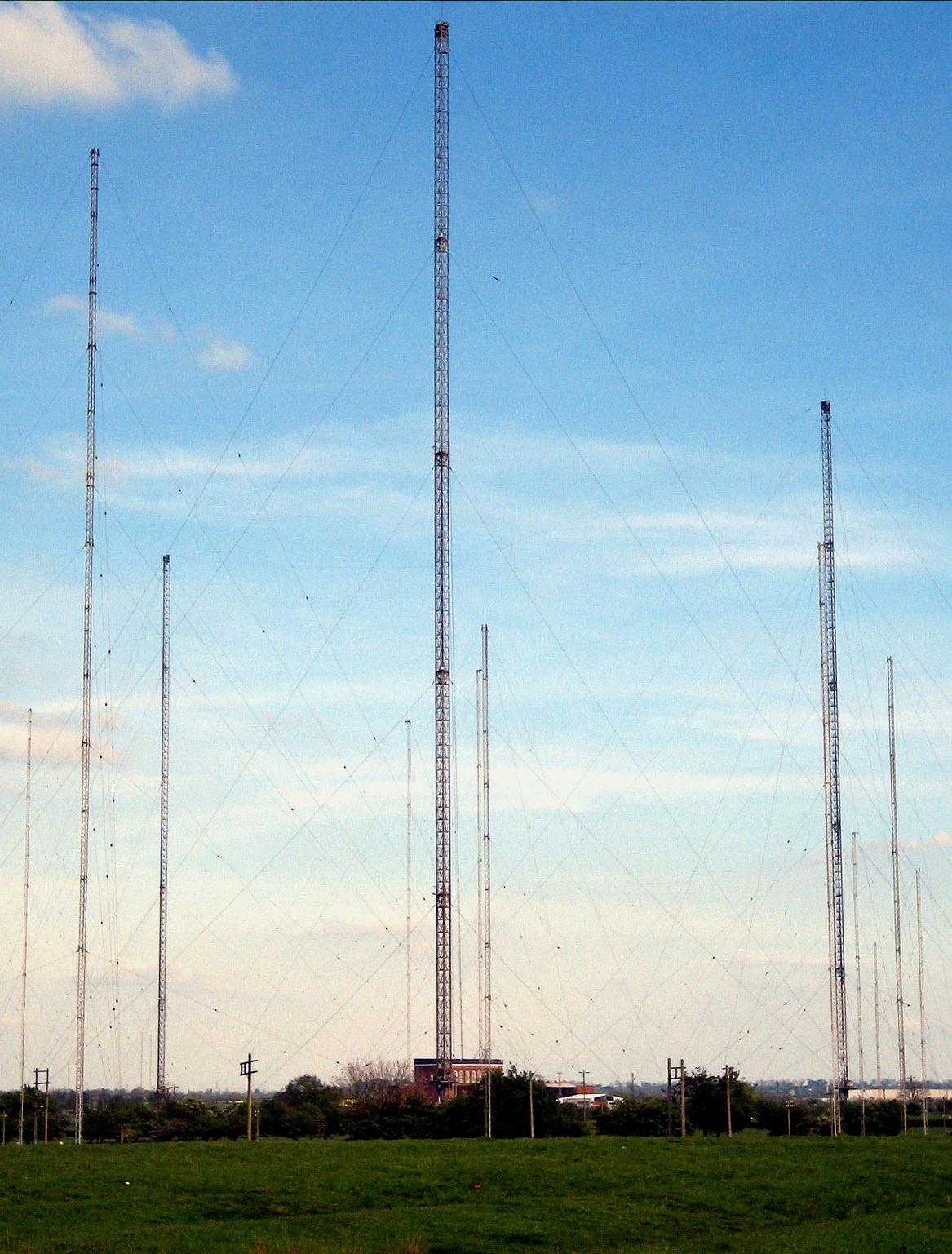
- A view of the tallest masts in 2005.

- Location within Warwickshire
- Location: Hillmorton, Rugby, Warwickshire
- Mast height: 250 metres (820 ft)
- Coordinates: 52.36577°N 1.18928°W
- Grid reference: SP5519574542
- Built: 1926
- Demolished: 2007

Rugby Radio Station was a large British government radio transmission facility just east of the Hillmorton area of the town of Rugby, Warwickshire in England. The site straddled the A5 trunk road, with most of it in Warwickshire, and part on the other side of the A5 in Northamptonshire. First opened in 1926, at its height in the 1950s it was the largest radio transmitting station in the world, with a total of 57 radio transmitters, covering an area of 1,600 acres (650 ha). Traffic slowly dwindled from the 1980s onwards, and the site was closed between 2003 and 2007.

The tallest masts on the site were 820 feet (250 m) tall, and could be seen from up to 20 miles (32 km) away, making the site for many years a major local landmark. Since closure, part of the site has been used for a large housing development called Houlton, named after Houlton, Maine, USA the American town which received the first transatlantic phone call from the station in 1927.

Exactly 100 years after the Rugby service entering official service, the Rugby Small scale DAB transmitter, broadcasting from a mast to the East of the site, entered official service on 1st January 2026.

== History ==
Following the end of the First World War the British government set about implementing plans for an Imperial Wireless Chain to link the countries of the British Empire. It was decided that the new wireless service would be state-run by the Post Office. The site east of Hillmorton, was chosen in 1923. Part of the site had previously been occupied by RAF Lilbourne between 1915 and 1920.

Its large very low frequency (VLF) transmitter came into service on 1 January 1926 and was originally used to transmit telegraph messages to the Commonwealth as part of the Imperial Wireless Chain. After the 1950s this transmitter, active as callsign GBR on 16.0 kHz, using Morse code and later on 15.975 kHz with frequency-shift keying FSK and minimum-shift keying MSK, was used by the British Navy for transmitting messages to submerged submarines. Criggion radio station acted as a reserve. The GBR transmitter was shut down on 1 April 2003 and was replaced by a new one at the Skelton transmitting station.

In 1927, a second transmitter was installed to initiate the first transatlantic commercial telephone service; linking New York and London on 60 kHz using single-sideband modulation. This transmitter was decommissioned in 1956 and became the time signal transmitter MSF. This new function developed from the decision, in 1951, to use the station to transmit modulated standard frequencies for scientific reference purposes. In 1972 these transmissions were consolidated onto the present frequency of 60 kHz and a further reference, that of a time signal, was added. In 1977 this took the form of the rolling slow code in use until April 2007, when BT's contract to transmit the time signal also passed to VT Communications, using their Anthorn radio station in Cumbria. The aerial system at the VLF transmitter existed between 1926 and 2004 and consisted of twelve 250 metre (820 ft) high, guyed steel-framework masts insulated against ground and carrying an aerial wire. This wire was mainly destroyed by heavy iceloads in the winter of 1940. After the shutdown of GBR, the facility was only used for transmitting the MSF time signal. Therefore, eight of the twelve masts were obsolete and demolished on the night of 19 June 2004 to 20 June 2004.

A trial transmission of the LORAN-C navigation system was run at the station from June 2005 until March 2007. The remaining four 'tall' masts were demolished on 2 August 2007. The site is now being developed into a large new housing estate named Houlton, the first homes of which were occupied in December 2017. The power and transmission buildings, as well as a water tower have been reused as part of Houlton School.

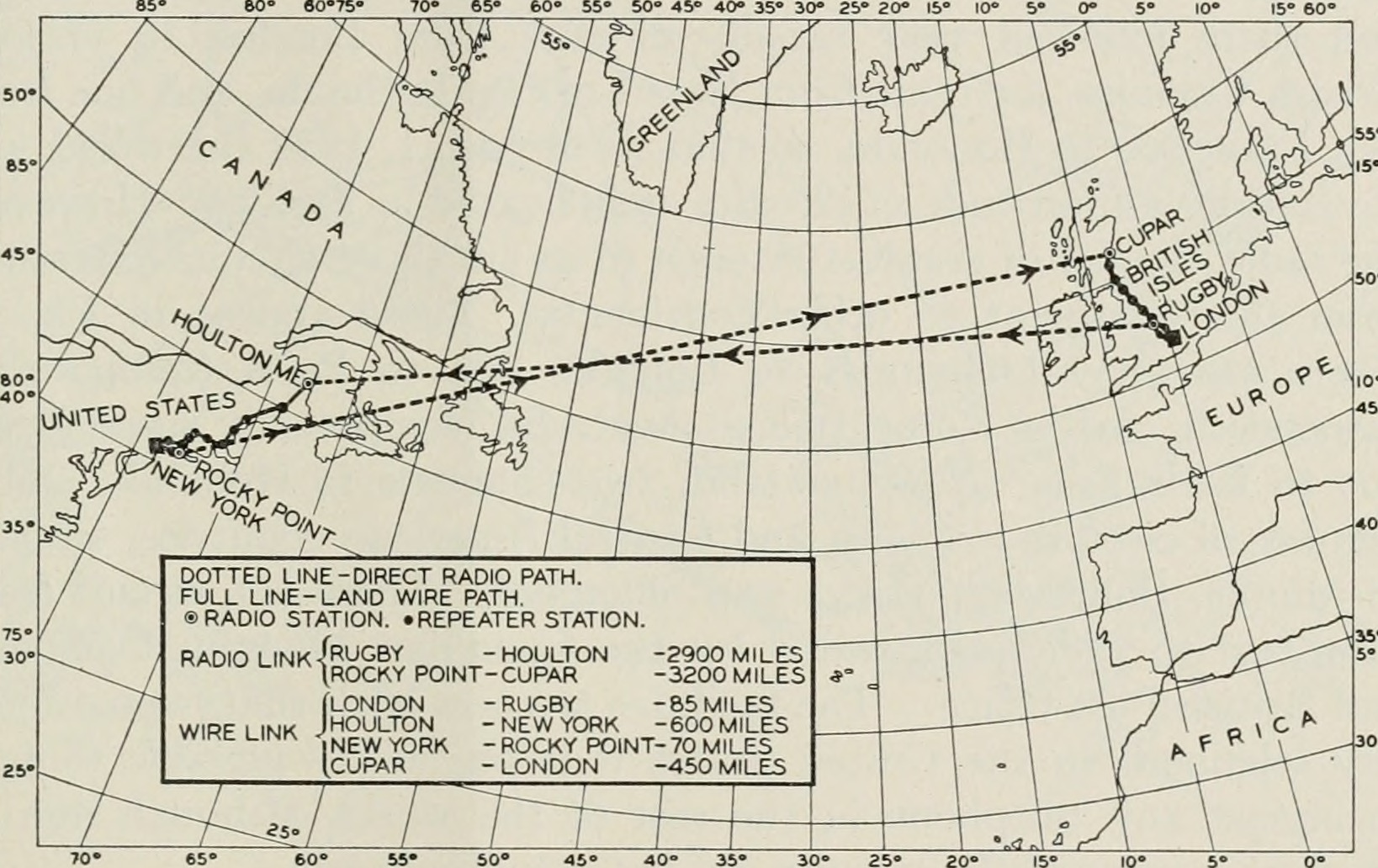
1922 diagram of the transatlantic radio network.

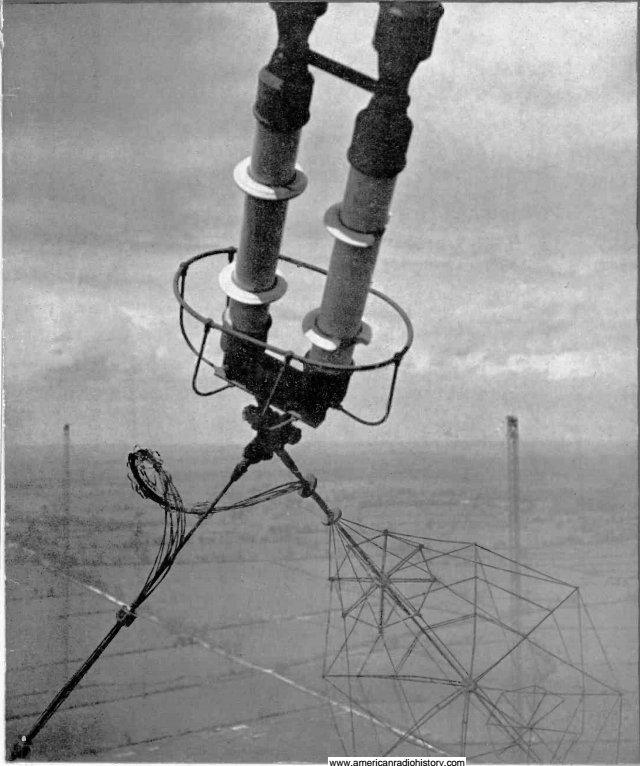
Strain insulator supporting the cage antenna, 1938

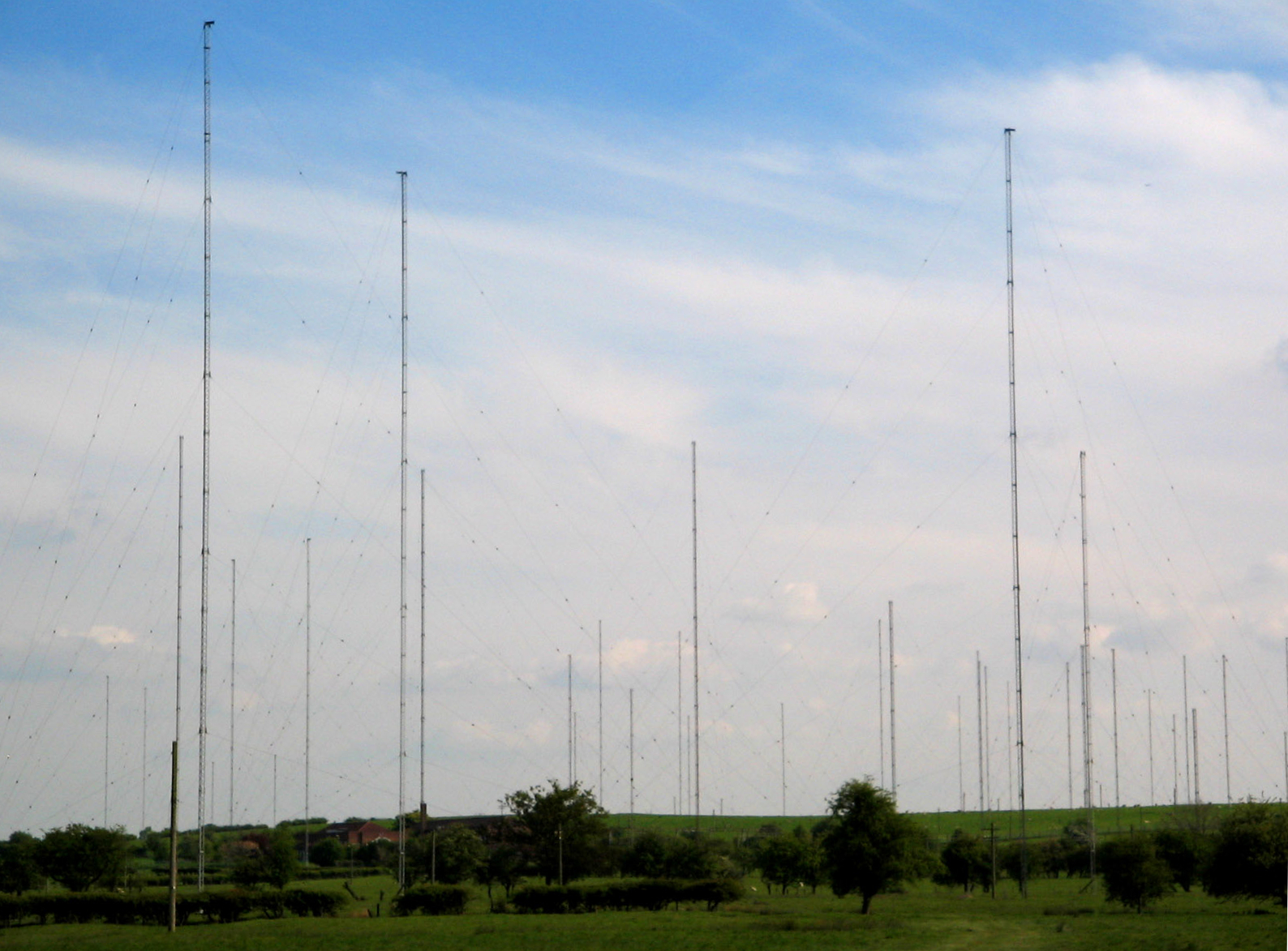
View of the site, 2005

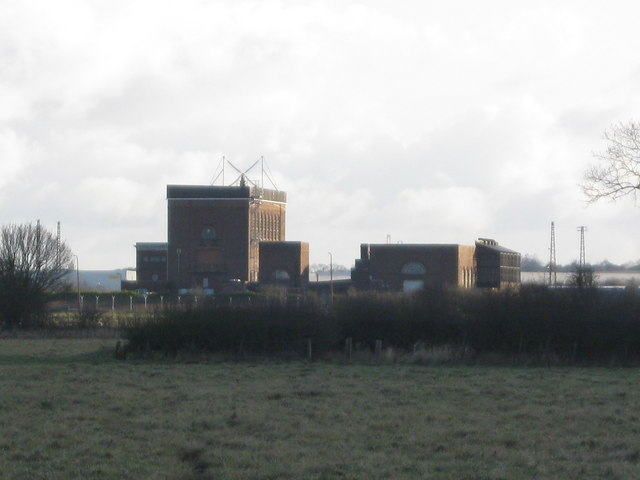
The main buildings of the station in 2009. These have been converted into Houlton School

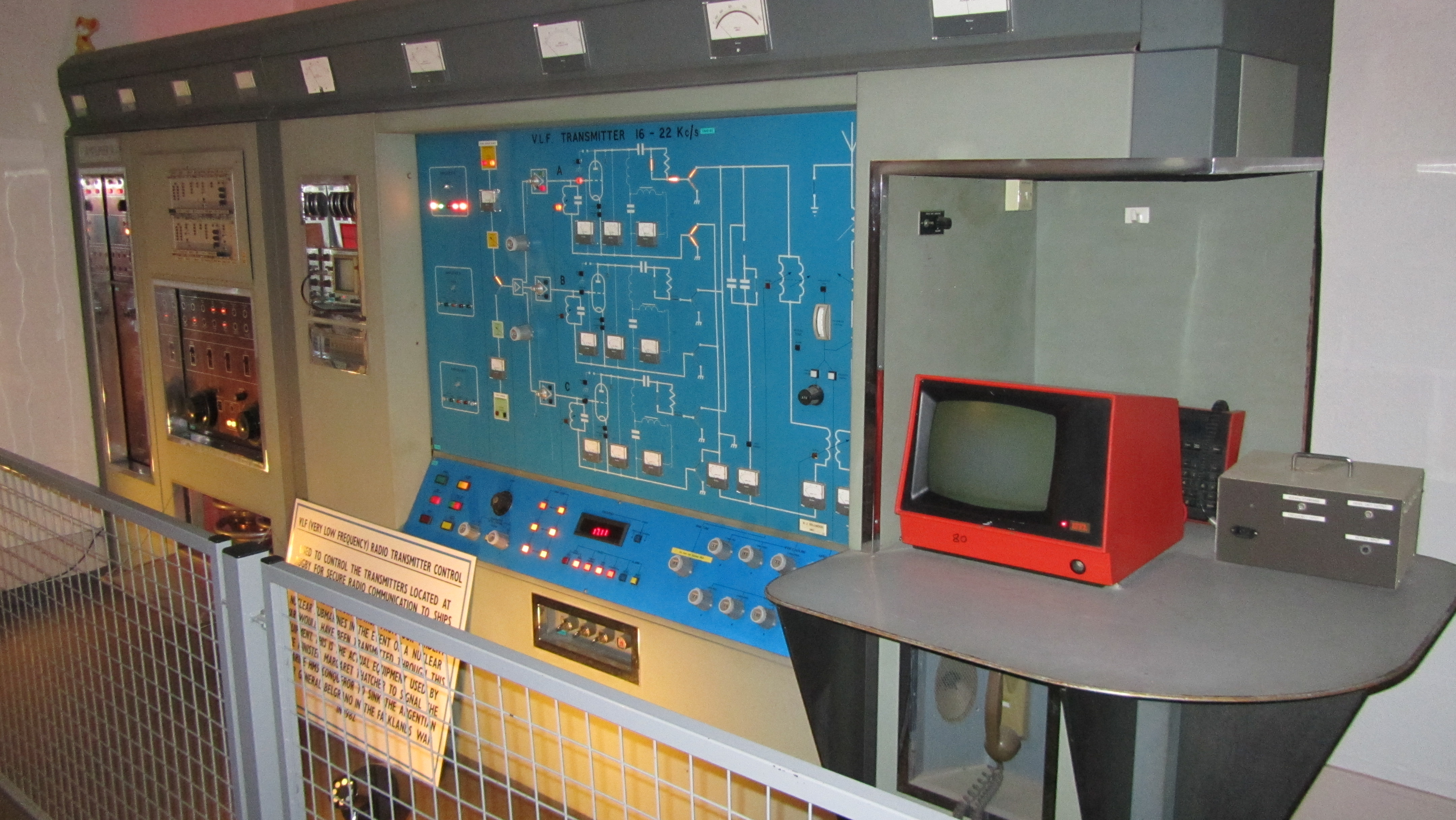
Control panel of the military very low frequency (VLF) transmitter used to communicate with submarines

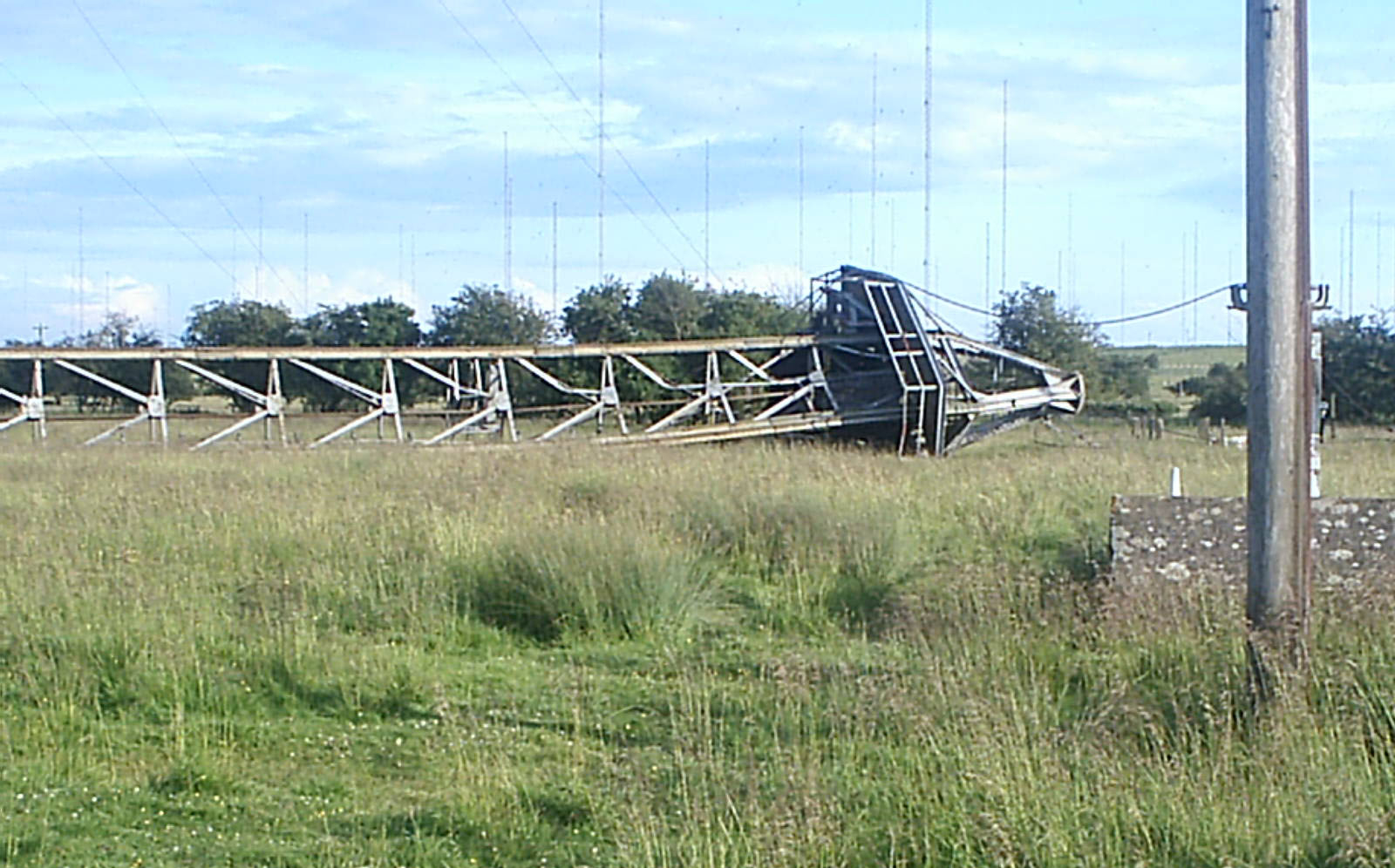
A radio mast after demolition in 2004

== See also ==
- List of masts
- List of tallest buildings and structures in Great Britain
- List of radio stations in the United Kingdom
