= Newton, Warwickshire =

Village in Warwickshire, England

Coordinates: 52.397514°N 1.22024°W

Newton
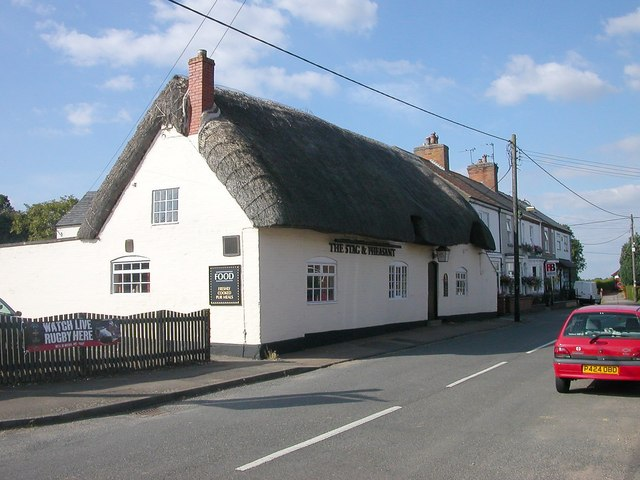
- The Stag and Pheasant pub, Main Street, Newton

- Location within Warwickshire
- Population: 1,273 (2021)
- OS grid reference: SP530780
- Civil parish: Newton and Biggin
- District: Rugby
- Shire county: Warwickshire
- Region: West Midlands
- Country: England
- Sovereign state: United Kingdom
- Post town: RUGBY
- Postcode district: CV23
- Dialling code: 01788
- Police: Warwickshire
- Fire: Warwickshire
- Ambulance: West Midlands
- UK Parliament: Rugby

Newton is a small village in the civil parish of Newton and Biggin in the Rugby borough of Warwickshire, England. The civil parish population taken at the 2021 census was 1,273.

Newton is about 3 miles (5 km) north east of Rugby, and is close to the A5 road which marks the border with Leicestershire and Northamptonshire, the three counties meet at Dow Bridge east of the village, where the A5 crosses the River Avon.

Just north of the village are the remains of the Roman town of Tripontium. The village is also at the northern end of the "Great Central Walk" the footpath along the trackbed of the old Great Central Main Line.

The main industry in the area is gravel extraction, which continues near the A5. Most of the houses in the village are of modern construction and were built to house workers for this industry. The Stag and Pheasant pub in Main St whilst not being the oldest pub in Warwickshire is the oldest building used as a pub in the county. Although the thatched building has a brick facing, probably added in the 17th century, its core is a massive oak cruck frame of indeterminate age, possibly Saxon. The Townlands Allotments are also of some antiquity being established in 1752 at the time of the enclosures. They are at the end of Little London Lane - one of a number of localities carrying this name in England. The origins of the name are not believed to be directly linked with "London" but rather a corruption of the Old English "utlenden". Utlenden (outsiders) were Welsh drovers who set up camps on waste land en route to markets in London.

Edward Cave, the 18th century publisher of the world's first magazine was born in the village in 1691.

The parish of Newton and Biggin includes the deserted medieval settlement of Biggin to the south-east of Newton village. Biggin Mill, a former water mill, existed 440 yards (400 m) south-east of the village; its remains still exist.
