= Four Shire Stone =

Boundary marker in Gloucestershire, Oxfordshire and Warwickshire, England

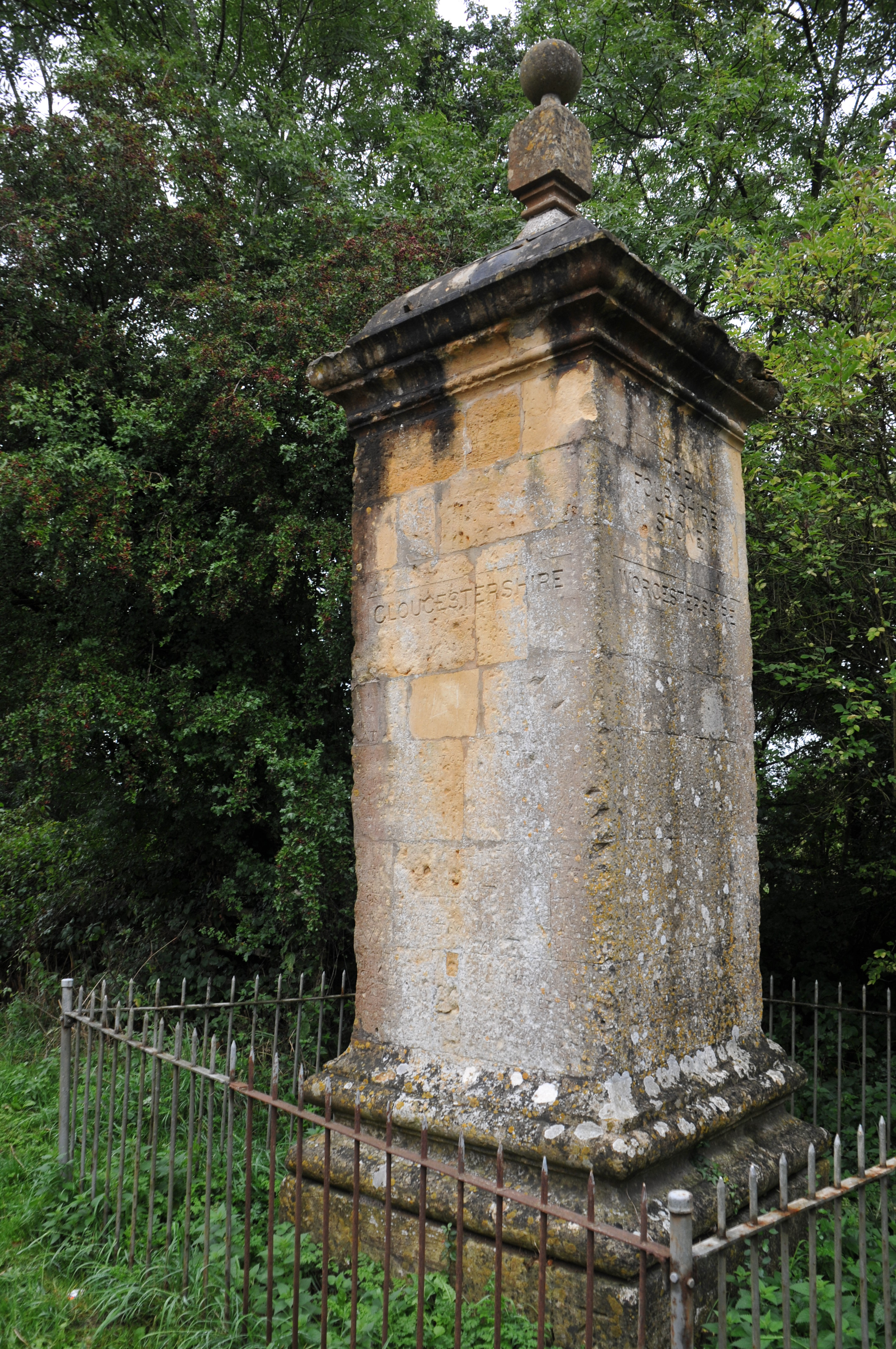
The Four Shire Stone

The Four Shire Stone is a boundary marker that marks the point where the English counties of Warwickshire, Oxfordshire, Gloucestershire, and Worcestershire once met. Since 1931, when the Worcestershire exclave of Evenlode was transferred to Gloucestershire, only three counties have met at the stone.

== Boundary marker ==
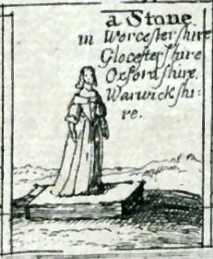
Detail from Wenceslaus Hollar's An Orthographical Designe of Several Views Upon Ye Road, in England and Wales (1660)

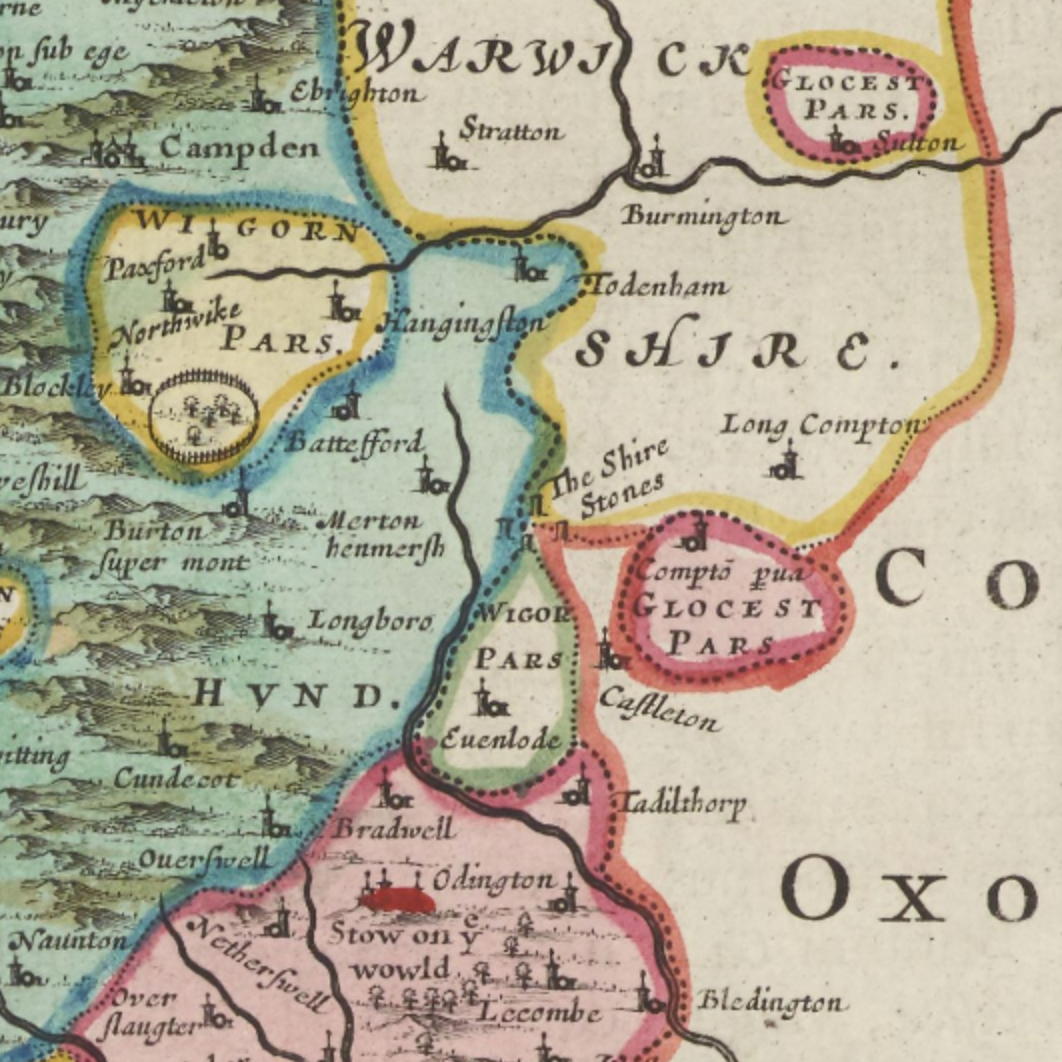
Detail from Joan Blaeu's map of Gloucestershire (1662), showing the "Shire Stones"

The Four Shire Stone is not a single stone, but a nine-foot high monument, built from the local Cotswold stone. It is in the English midlands at the northern corner of a T junction on the A44 road, a mile and a half east of the small town of Moreton-in-Marsh (which has the closest railway station), at 51°59′15″N 1°39′57″W, grid reference SP2301432023. The existing structure was probably built in the 18th century, and is a grade II listed building. There was an earlier "4 Shire Stone" on or near the site in 1675, almost certainly that illustrated in 1660. Thomas Habington's Survey of Worcestershire mentions "the stone which toucheth four sheeres, a thing rarely scene".

Five (formerly seven) civil parishes meet at the stone:

- Moreton-in-Marsh to the west, in Gloucestershire;
- Formerly Batsford to the northwest, also in Gloucestershire, until Batsford/Moreton-in-Marsh boundary change in 1987;
- Formerly Lower Lemington to the north, also in Gloucestershire, and which merged into Batsford in 1935;
- Great Wolford to the north, in Warwickshire;
- Little Compton to the northeast, also in Warwickshire;
- Chastleton to the southeast, in Oxfordshire;
- Evenlode to the south, now also in Gloucestershire; until 1931 it was a detached part of Worcestershire.

The J. R. R. Tolkien Society claims that the Four Shire Stone inspired the "Three-Farthing Stone" in J. R. R. Tolkien's book The Lord of the Rings. In that work, the Shire, the homeland of the hobbits is divided into four farthings, three of which meet at the "Three-Farthing Stone".

== 2022 restoration ==
The failing state of this unique bit of local history inspired James Hayman-Joyce, a local, semi-retired chartered surveyor, to do what he could to restore it. He formed the Four Shire Stone Restoration Committee with the aim of raising £20,000 to restore the Four Shire Stone to its former glory. The project comprises restoring and repairing the stonework, replacing the railings and enhancing the engravings on all four sides of the pillar.

== See also ==
- Quadripoint
- Three Shires Oak, marking the meeting point of Derbyshire, Nottinghamshire and Yorkshire
- No Man's Heath, Warwickshire, meeting point of Leicestershire, Warwickshire, and Staffordshire
- Dow Bridge, meeting point of Warwickshire, Northamptonshire and Leicestershire
