= Houlton, Warwickshire =

Housing development in Warwickshire, England

Coordinates: 52.357°N 1.188°W

Houlton
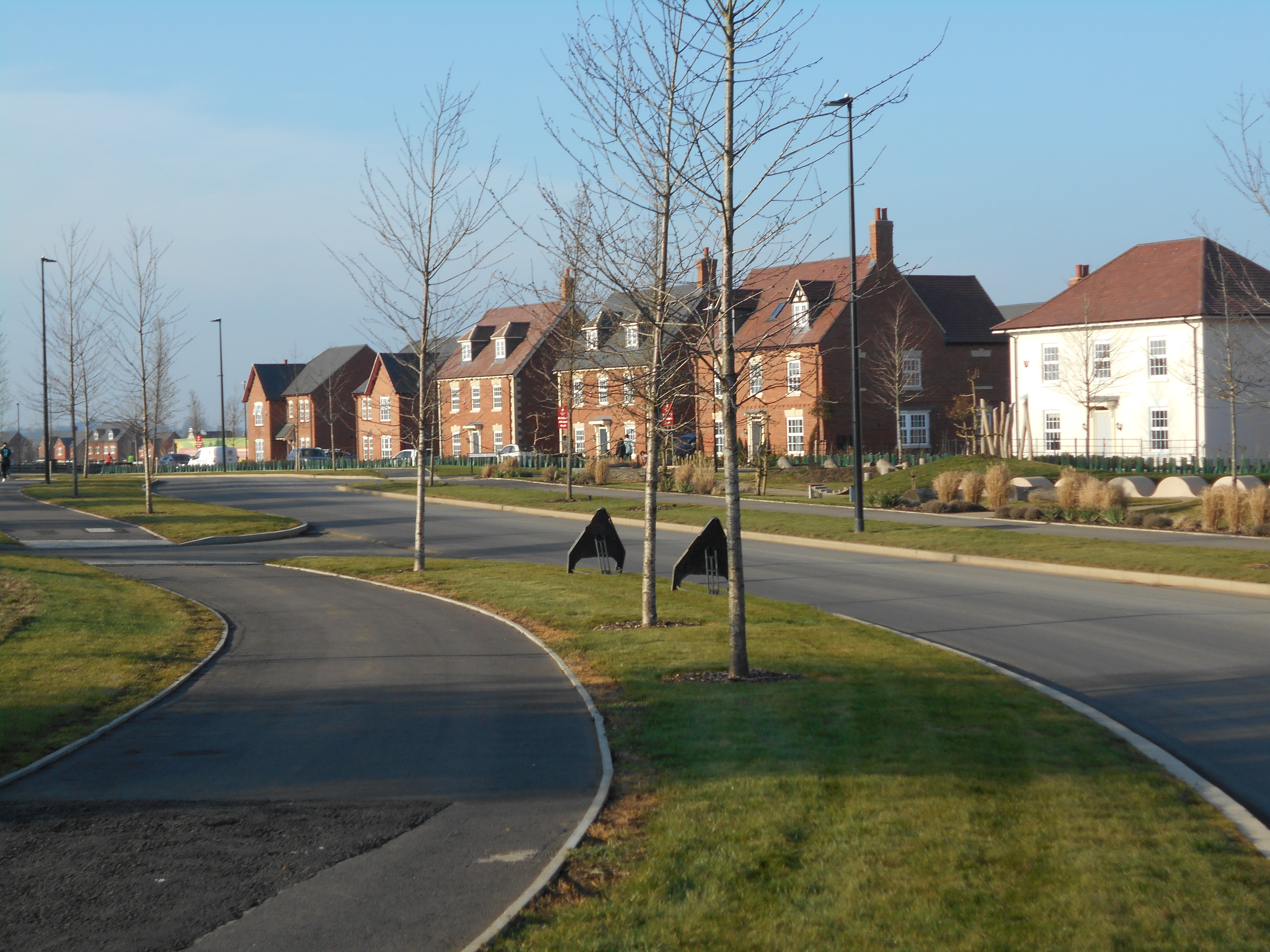
- Completed housing at Houlton

- Location within Warwickshire
- OS grid reference: SP553736
- Civil parish: Clifton upon Dunsmore
- District: Rugby
- Shire county: Warwickshire
- Region: West Midlands
- Country: England
- Sovereign state: United Kingdom
- Post town: RUGBY
- Postcode district: CV23 1
- Dialling code: 01788
- Police: Warwickshire
- Fire: Warwickshire
- Ambulance: West Midlands
- UK Parliament: Rugby

Houlton is a large housing development to the east of Rugby, Warwickshire, England. It is located between the Rugby suburb of Hillmorton, Warwickshire and Crick, Northamptonshire, west of the A5 road and M1 motorway.

== History ==
Between 1926 and 2007 the site on which most of the development sits was part of the Rugby Radio Station. It was on this site that the first commercial transatlantic telephone service signal was transmitted in 1927, to the American Telephone and Telegraph receiver site in Houlton, Maine, USA, the American town after which its English counterpart is named.

In December 2017 the first residents moved in. The development is expected to take 15 years to complete, and when it is, there are expected to be 6,200 houses.

== Facilities ==
There are several community features in the development. Dollman Farm is a restored farmhouse which greatly pre-dates the new estate and is used as a visitor information centre. The Barn is a community centre/village hall which holds communal classes and clubs and can be hired for parties or events. The Tuning Fork is a restaurant/cafe which is open to the public. Nearby is a large adventure play area. Finally a new primary school has been opened, St Gabriel's CofE Academy, named after the patron saint of communications.

Future plans include the building of two further primary schools and a GP's surgery. A 1.5-mile link road opened in late 2019 and has made access to Rugby town centre easier for residents as it bypasses Hillmorton.

In October 2019 planning permission was granted for a new £39m 11-18 secondary school, including Sixth Form, to be named Houlton School, which includes the Grade II listed former radio station buildings, as well as three new teaching blocks. The secondary school will have spaces for around 1,200 pupils. Opened in September 2021, initially to Year 7 pupils,

In December 2019, a planning application was submitted to build a new David Lloyd Leisure centre which will include a health, fitness and racquets club and is yet to be approved. In September 2020 the application was approved.

== Transport ==
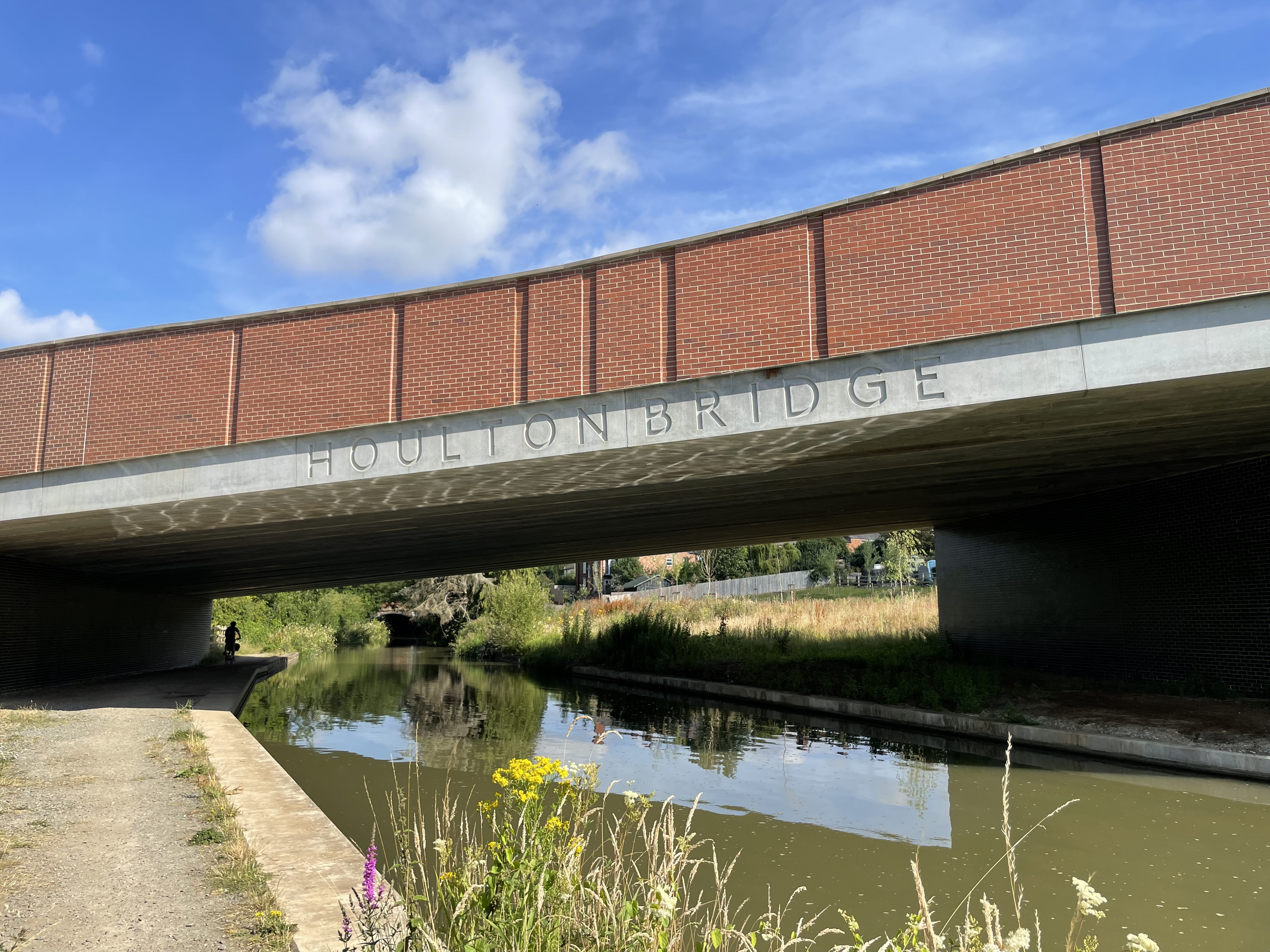
Houlton Bridge as viewed from the Oxford Canal towpath

The A5 trunk road and Junction 18 of the M1 motorway are within 1.5 miles of the estate. The nearest railway station (Rugby) is four miles away, located on the West Coast Main Line. It offers direct trains to cities such as London, Birmingham, Glasgow and Holyhead. Nearby bus routes include the Coventry to Northampton 96 and the Rugby to Northampton D2. The 78-mile long Oxford Canal, connecting Oxford and Hawkesbury Junction, borders the site and links with the Grand Union Canal. Birmingham Airport is located 27 miles away.

Rugby Parkway railway station is a proposed station that will be much closer to Houlton than the main Rugby one, near the site of the former Kilsby and Crick station. In July 2019 Warwickshire County Council's Draft Rail Strategy for 2019-2034 proposed that the station would be opened between 2019 and 2026.

== Media coverage ==
In September 2022, the national Observer newspaper gave coverage to Houlton in a piece entitled "Houlton Rugby: a new town that’s sending out all the right signals" by Rowan Moore. The article praised the development as offering 'thoughtful planning, nature on the doorstep – and a secondary school with shades of Tate Modern’s Turbine Hall’', and went on to praise the development as offering 'as serious a contribution', to the national housing crisis 'in both quality and quantity, as any organisation in the private sector has been able to think up.'

== Governance ==
Houlton is within the civil parish of Clifton-upon-Dunsmore. However as of early 2026 moves are afoot to make Houlton a separate civil parish in its own right, with its own parish council.
