= List of tripoints of counties of England =

This article contains a list of tripoints of counties of England. A tripoint is the point at which three geographical regions meet.

== Ceremonial county tripoints ==
The table contains a list of the 68 tripoints for the ceremonial counties of England as per the Lieutenancies Act 1997, as amended. Also included are the three points at which two counties meet the borders with Wales and Scotland. For each tripoint the counties are ordered with the first alphabetically given first, and the counties listed anti-clockwise around the point from there.

County 1	County 2	County 3	Grid Ref	Notes
Devon	Dorset	Somerset	ST328027	
Dorset	Wiltshire	Somerset	ST773311	
Dorset	Hampshire	Wiltshire	SU031211	
Hampshire	West Sussex	Surrey	SU873326	
East Sussex	Surrey	West Sussex	TQ419398	
East Sussex	Kent	Surrey	TQ434401	
Berkshire	Buckinghamshire	Oxfordshire	SU766834	
Berkshire	Surrey	Buckinghamshire	TQ026757	
Berkshire	Hampshire	Surrey	SU854599	
Berkshire	Wiltshire	Hampshire	SU350590	
Berkshire	Oxfordshire	Wiltshire	SU289807	
Greater London	Surrey	Kent	TQ424568	
Essex	Hertfordshire	Greater London	TQ375999	
Essex	Greater London	Kent	TQ535786	
Cambridgeshire	Norfolk	Lincolnshire	TF466178	
Cambridgeshire	Suffolk	Norfolk	TL652848	
Cambridgeshire	Essex	Suffolk	TL649435	
Cambridgeshire	Hertfordshire	Essex	TL420361	
Cambridgeshire	Northamptonshire	Lincolnshire	TF019057	
Lincolnshire	Rutland	Northamptonshire	TF019057	
Bedfordshire	Hertfordshire	Cambridgeshire	TL263440	
Bedfordshire	Buckinghamshire	Hertfordshire	SP997152	
Bedfordshire	Northamptonshire	Buckinghamshire	SP911559	
Bedfordshire	Cambridgeshire	Northamptonshire	TL046705	
Buckinghamshire	Greater London	Hertfordshire	TQ039900	
Berkshire	Surrey	Greater London	TQ035755	
Buckinghamshire	Northamptonshire	Oxfordshire	SP605356	
Bristol	Somerset	Gloucestershire	ST646700	
Gloucestershire	Somerset	Wiltshire	ST796700	
Gloucestershire	Herefordshire	Wales	SO552143	
Gloucestershire	Worcestershire	Herefordshire	SO759358	
Gloucestershire	Warwickshire	Worcestershire	SP160460	
Gloucestershire	Oxfordshire	Warwickshire	SP230321	
Gloucestershire	Wiltshire	Oxfordshire	SU220991	
Herefordshire	Shropshire	Wales	SO350727	
Herefordshire	Worcestershire	Shropshire	SO579678	
West Midlands	Worcestershire	Warwickshire	SP088744	
Northamptonshire	Warwickshire	Oxfordshire	SP458524	
Leicestershire	Lincolnshire	Nottinghamshire	SK821428	
Leicestershire	Rutland	Lincolnshire	SK902184	
Leicestershire	Northamptonshire	Rutland	SP873926	
Leicestershire	Warwickshire	Northamptonshire	SP544779	
Leicestershire	Staffordshire	Warwickshire	SK278100	
Staffordshire	West Midlands	Warwickshire	SP144989	
Staffordshire	Worcestershire	West Midlands	SO889813	
Shropshire	Worcestershire	Staffordshire	SO805841	
Derbyshire	South Yorkshire	West Yorkshire	SE118027	
Derbyshire	Nottinghamshire	South Yorkshire	SK534797	
Derbyshire	Leicestershire	Nottinghamshire	SK493309	
Derbyshire	Staffordshire	Leicestershire	SK273115	
Derbyshire	West Yorkshire	Greater Manchester	SE061046	
Cheshire	Greater Manchester	Merseyside	SJ617945	
Cheshire	Derbyshire	Greater Manchester	SJ980859	
Cheshire	Staffordshire	Derbyshire	SK009685	
Cheshire	Shropshire	Staffordshire	SJ745446	
Cheshire	Wales	Shropshire	SJ512431	
Greater Manchester	West Yorkshire	Lancashire	SD904206	
Greater Manchester	Lancashire	Merseyside	SD516028	
East Riding	Nottinghamshire	Lincolnshire	SK799960	
East Riding	South Yorkshire	Nottinghamshire	SE707011	
East Riding	North Yorkshire	South Yorkshire	SE629181	
Lancashire	West Yorkshire	North Yorkshire	SD970393	
North Yorkshire	West Yorkshire	South Yorkshire	SE508141	
Durham	Tyne and Wear	Northumberland	NZ115567	
Cumbria	Durham	Northumberland	NY800440	
Cumbria	North Yorkshire	Durham	NY890070	
Cumbria	Lancashire	North Yorkshire	SD700813	
Cumbria	Northumberland	Scotland	NY561884	

As a result of the Local Government Act 1972, between 1974 and 1996 the counties of Avon and Cleveland had three tripoints that are no longer in existence.

County 1	County 2	County 3	Grid Ref
Avon	Wiltshire	Gloucestershire	ST812865
Avon	Somerset	Wiltshire	ST799585
Cleveland	Durham	North Yorkshire	NZ196157

== Historic county tripoints ==
The table contains a list of the 58 principal tripoints for the historic counties of England prior to 1800. As the English county boundaries had remained essentially unchanged since the eleventh century, the list can thus be seen to represent the "original" locations of the English county tripoints.

During the nineteenth century a number of laws, most notably the Counties (Detached Parts) Act 1844 (7 & 8 Vict. c. 61), resulted in the relocation of some sections of historic boundaries, principally to remove detached portions of counties. With the notable exception of the creation of the metropolitan counties in 1974, the majority of the boundaries have remained unchanged since then. For comparison the locations of the tripoints in 1890 are also listed in the table, by which time the majority of the localised changes had been made. The handful of additional tripoints that were formed by detached parts of counties are not listed in the table (e.g. Devon(detached)-Dorset-Somerset, Staffordshire-Shropshire(detached)-Worcestershire(detached)).

The symbol (†) indicates that the original point still exists unchanged as a tripoint of the current ceremonial counties. (Many of the other points still exist as the meeting of three administrative districts.) For each tripoint the counties are ordered with the first alphabetically given first, and the counties listed anti-clockwise around the point from there.

County 1	County 2	County 3	Grid Ref (1806)	Grid Ref (1890)	Notes
Devon	Dorset	Somerset	ST259087	ST328027	
Dorset	Wiltshire	Somerset	ST773311	ST773311	†
Dorset	Hampshire	Wiltshire	SU117144	SU031211	
Hampshire	Sussex	Surrey	SU873326	SU873326	†
Kent	Surrey	Sussex	TQ434401	TQ434401	†
Berkshire	Wiltshire	Hampshire	SU358612	SU350590	
Berkshire	Hampshire	Surrey	SU854599	SU854599	†
Berkshire	Surrey	Buckinghamshire	SU993734	SU993734	
Berkshire	Buckinghamshire	Oxfordshire	SU768839	SU768839	
Berkshire	Oxfordshire	Gloucestershire	SU244984	SU244984	
Berkshire	Gloucestershire	Wiltshire	SU195968	SU220991	
Gloucestershire	Somerset	Wiltshire	ST796700	ST796700	†
Gloucestershire	Worcestershire	Herefordshire	SO759358	SO759358	†
Gloucestershire	Herefordshire	Monmouthshire	SO552143	SO552143	†
Gloucestershire	Warwickshire	Worcestershire	SP102479	SP102479	
Gloucestershire	Oxfordshire	Warwickshire	SP230321	SP230321	†
Buckinghamshire	Northamptonshire	Oxfordshire	SP605356	SP605356	†
Buckinghamshire	Surrey	Middlesex	TQ027717	TQ027717	
Buckinghamshire	Middlesex	Hertfordshire	TQ039900	TQ039900	†
Bedfordshire	Hertfordshire	Cambridgeshire	TL263440	TL263440	†
Bedfordshire	Buckinghamshire	Hertfordshire	TL008157	SP997152	
Bedfordshire	Northamptonshire	Buckinghamshire	SP911559	SP911559	†
Bedfordshire	Huntingdonshire	Northamptonshire	TL046705	TL046705	†
Middlesex	Surrey	Kent	TQ368790	TQ368790	
Essex	Middlesex	Kent	TQ394804	TQ394804	
Essex	Hertfordshire	Middlesex	TQ375999	TQ375999	
Cambridgeshire	Hertfordshire	Essex	TL399414	TL420361	
Cambridgeshire	Essex	Suffolk	TL649435	TL649435	†
Cambridgeshire	Suffolk	Norfolk	TL605916	TL652848	
Cambridgeshire	Norfolk	Lincolnshire	TF478176	TF478176	
Cambridgeshire	Lincolnshire	Northamptonshire	TF258076	TF258076	
Cambridgeshire	Northamptonshire	Huntingdonshire	TL194981	TL223963	
Bedfordshire	Cambridgeshire	Huntingdonshire	TL170561	TL220527	
Lincolnshire	Rutland	Northamptonshire	TF014057	TF014057	
Leicestershire	Northamptonshire	Rutland	SP873926	SP873926	†
Leicestershire	Warwickshire	Northamptonshire	SP544779	SP544779	†
Leicestershire	Staffordshire	Warwickshire	SK278100	SK278100	†
Leicestershire	Rutland	Lincolnshire	SK902184	SK902184	†
Staffordshire	Worcestershire	Warwickshire	SP038831	SP063835	
Shropshire	Worcestershire	Staffordshire	SO774785	SO774785	
Herefordshire	Worcestershire	Shropshire	SO581679	SO577677	
Herefordshire	Shropshire	Radnorshire	SO350727	SO350727	†
Derbyshire	Staffordshire	Leicestershire	SK273115	SK273115	†
Derbyshire	Leicestershire	Nottinghamshire	SK493309	SK493309	†
Leicestershire	Lincolnshire	Nottinghamshire	SK821428	SK821428	†
Derbyshire	Nottinghamshire	Yorkshire	SK533789	SK533789	
Cheshire	Flintshire	Shropshire	SJ512431	SJ512431	†
Cheshire	Shropshire	Staffordshire	SJ745446	SJ745446	†
Cheshire	Staffordshire	Derbyshire	SK009685	SK009685	†
Cheshire	Derbyshire	Yorkshire	SK133996	SK133996	
Cheshire	Yorkshire	Lancashire	SD975025	SD975025	
Lincolnshire	Yorkshire	Nottinghamshire	SE701018	SE701018	
Lancashire	Yorkshire	Westmorland	SD701827	SD701827	
Cumberland	Lancashire	Westmorland	NY276027	NY276027	
Cumberland	Westmorland	Durham	NY771336	NY771336	
Durham	Westmorland	Yorkshire	NY815283	NY815283	
Cumberland	Durham	Northumberland	NY800440	NY800440	†
Cumberland	Northumberland	Roxburghshire	NY561884	NY561884	†

== See also ==
- List of tripoints
- Three Shire Stone (disambiguation)
- Bassetts Pole
