= Houlton School =

Secondary school in Houlton, Warwickshire, England

Coordinates: 52.3671°N 1.1884°W

Location
- Signal Drive; Houlton; Warwickshire, CV23 1ED; England

Information
- Type: Free school
- Established: 2021
- Local authority: Warwickshire
- Trust: TLET
- Department for Education URN: 143707 Tables
- Ofsted: Reports
- Gender: Co-educational
- Age: 11 to 18
- Website: www.houltonschool.org.uk

Houlton School is a co-educational all-through school and sixth form located in Houlton, Warwickshire, England. The school's buildings have been developed on the historic site of the Rugby Radio Station. Designed to serve 1,100 students, the school opened on 1 September 2021 with its first cohort of 180 year 7 students.

== History ==
Houlton School in Rugby, Warwickshire, is located on the grounds of the Rugby Radio Station, which was established in 1926. According to developer Morgan Sindall Construction, the station "at the height of its power in the mid-20th century, was the largest in the world. In 1927 the site transmitted the first transatlantic radio signal." The station was phased out between 2003 and 2007, and it became a Grade II-listed site on the National Heritage List for England in February 2005.

Van Heyningen and Haward Architects created the plan that transformed the former Rugby Radio Station power building and its water tower, and added three new teaching blocks. Morgan Sindall Construction received a £39 million commission to convert the radio station into a secondary school that would "provide more than 1,000 pupils with a modern 123,100 square foot learning environment." The former power room was converted into an assembly hall and canteen, retaining many of its original features. They removed the roof, retaining the walls, then inserted a steel frame to create additional floors within the building. In addition, the project restored the façades of the listed building while preserving "the industrial character of the main internal spaces." The conversion received the first RIBA Reinvention Award in 2023.

In February 2021, Houlton School was approved by the government's education secretary to open in September 2021.

== Principals ==
- Michael McCulley (Founding Principal, September 2020-December 2025)
- Paul Brockwell (Executive Principal, January 2026 - Present)

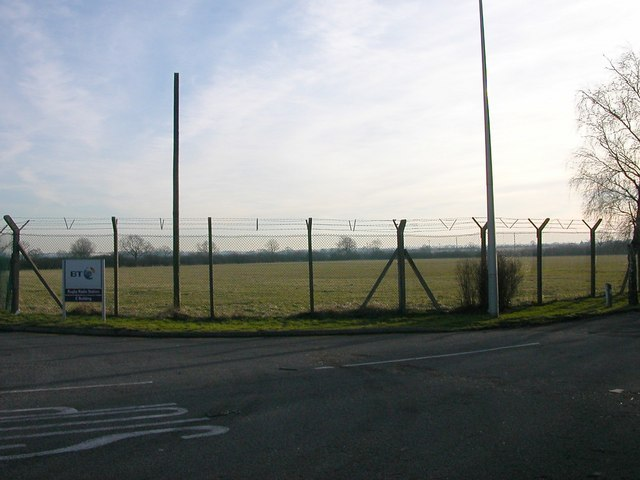
Campus location before Houlton School groundbreaking

== Admissions ==
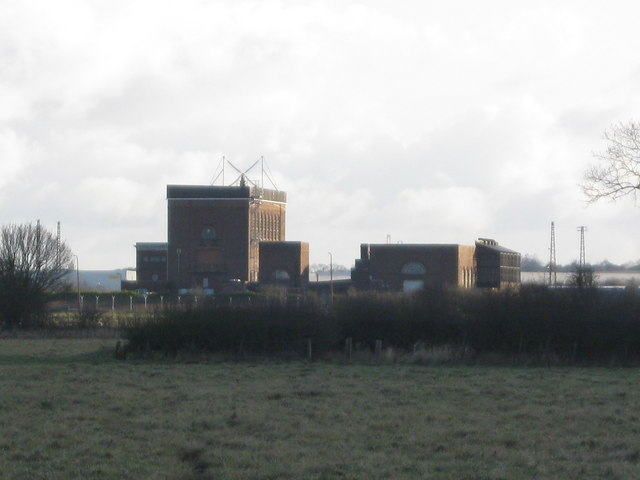
Rugby Radio Station in 2007 before transformation to school

Houlton is an independent academy, not affiliated with the local district. Houlton requires no tuition fees. Pupils may apply to enroll as long as they are able to commute to school daily. Students who have a sibling already attending or who live near Houlton School have a greater chance of admission.

== Curriculum ==
Students at Houlton school study the "full National Curriculum" and the core academic qualifications of the English Baccalaureate. The school plans to offer a "range of applied, employer-focused qualifications, including digital broadcast and new media" at grades 10 and 11.

The reconstructed five-storey building provides "art space, drama and dance studios, music room and sixth form social space".

According to the Transforming Lives Educational Trust, which has operating responsibilities for the Houlton School, the site will also have:

...purpose-built Science, Technology, Engineering and Mathematics (STEM) and Humanities buildings, as well as a Sport England Compliant Sports Centre that will be available for community use. There will also be a professional grade radio studio that will broadcast from the site, honouring the campus' heritage as a global centre for communication.

=== Co-curricular offerings ===
Multiple different clubs both during and after school hours offer students opportunities for co-curricular education. These clubs include sports, arts, and sciences, and are all taught by existing teaching staff.

== Achievement ==
The school's first, graded Ofsted report was published in April 2024, when it was awarded "Good" in all areas (The Quality of Education; Behaviour and Attitudes; Personal Development; Leadership and Management; and Overall Effectiveness) by His Majesty's Inspector, Ian Tustian. The report states that, "Houlton school is aspirational for all its pupils, including those pupils with special needs and/or disabilities (SEND). It wants all pupils to achieve well academically and be ready for life in the wider world..." and "...pupils rise to the challenges set by the school. They work hard, adhere to the rules and routines and contribute to school life. As a result most pupils learn well in their lessons and take part in the wealth of clubs and trips on offer ".

The School has also been awarded the World Class Schools Quality Mark and Global Inclusion Award 2024.

== Partner schools ==
Houlton School has three partner schools: Henry Hinde Infant School, Henry Hinde Junior School and Ashlawn School. These partner schools are all affiliated with the Transforming Lives Educational Trust.
