= Grade II* listed buildings in Rugby (borough) =

There are over 20,000 Grade II* listed buildings in England. This page is a list of these buildings in the district of Rugby in Warwickshire.

== Rugby ==
Name	Location	Type	Completed (Note: The date given is the date used by Historic England as significant for the initial building or that of an important part in the structure's description.)	Date designated	Grid ref. (Note: The grid reference is based on the British national grid reference system, sometimes known as OSGB36, used by the Ordnance Survey.) Geo-coordinates	Entry number (Note: The "List Entry Number" is a unique number assigned to each listed building and scheduled monument by Historic England.)	Image
Ansty Hall	Ansty, Rugby	Country House	1678	4 December 1951	SP4007283717; 52°27′00″N 1°24′42″W	1365084	Ansty Hall More images
Church of St James	Ansty, Rugby	Church	13th century	18 February 1988	SP3997583697; 52°26′59″N 1°24′48″W	1034889	Church of St James More images
Church of St John the Baptist	Brinklow, Rugby	Church	Late 15th century	6 October 1960	SP4369179628; 52°24′46″N 1°21′33″W	1034957	Church of St John the Baptist More images
Church of St Botolph	Burton Hastings, Rugby	Church	14th century	6 October 1960	SP4098489906; 52°30′20″N 1°23′51″W	1034891	Church of St Botolph More images
Church of the Holy Trinity	Churchover, Rugby	Church	12th century	16 October 1960	SP5104480811; 52°25′22″N 1°15′03″W	1233438	Church of the Holy Trinity More images
Coton House	Churchover, Rugby	House	Late 18th century	4 December 1951	SP5212279519; 52°24′40″N 1°14′07″W	1276617	Upload Photo
Church of St Mary the Virgin	Clifton upon Dunsmore, Rugby	Church	13th century	6 October 1960	SP5312876404; 52°22′59″N 1°13′15″W	1233440	Church of St Mary the Virgin More images
Tennis Court at Combe Abbey	Combe Abbey, Combe Fields, Rugby	Tennis Court	earlier 19th century	24 July 1992	SP4038179810; 52°24′53″N 1°24′28″W	1233658	Upload Photo
The Woodlands	Combe Deer Park, Combe Fields, Rugby	House	1993	6 October 1960	SP3886278998; 52°24′27″N 1°25′49″W	1233533	Upload Photo
West Lodge	Combe Fields, Rugby	House	c. 1775	6 October 1960	SP3960978948; 52°24′26″N 1°25′09″W	1233532	Upload Photo
Church of St John	Copston Magna, Rugby	Church	1849	6 October 1960	SP4519688420; 52°29′31″N 1°20′09″W	1185719	Church of St John More images
Bilton Grange School and attached Chapel and Terrace	Dunchurch, Rugby	House	Late 18th century	2 August 1984	SP4922471795; 52°20′31″N 1°16′44″W	1034932	Bilton Grange School and attached Chapel and Terrace More images
Church of St Peter	Dunchurch, Rugby	Church	Late C12/early 13th century	6 October 1960	SP4861771266; 52°20′14″N 1°17′16″W	1185418	Church of St Peter More images
Dunchurch Lodge	Dunchurch, Rugby	Country House	1906-7	18 January 2001	SP4900171317; 52°20′16″N 1°16′56″W	1246211	Upload Photo
Church of St Nicholas	Frankton, Rugby	Church	13th century	6 October 1960	SP4237070160; 52°19′40″N 1°22′47″W	1185518	Church of St Nicholas More images
Church of St Peter	Grandborough, Rugby	Church	Mid 14th century	6 October 1960	SP4924266996; 52°17′56″N 1°16′46″W	1034911	Church of St Peter More images
Church of All Saints	Leamington Hastings, Rugby	Church	Mid 13th century	6 October 1960	SP4444267594; 52°18′17″N 1°20′59″W	1299343	Church of All Saints More images
Church of St Esprit	Marton, Rugby	Church	Early 13th century	6 October 1960	SP4068668901; 52°19′00″N 1°24′16″W	1319938	Church of St Esprit More images
Princethorpe College, Church of Our Lady and All Angels	Princethorpe, Rugby	Tower	1897-1901	25 August 1987	SP3946871011; 52°20′09″N 1°25′20″W	1034910	Princethorpe College, Church of Our Lady and All Angels More images
Church of St Leonard	Ryton-on-Dunsmore, Rugby	Church	11th century	6 October 1960	SP3865074533; 52°22′03″N 1°26′02″W	1034875	Church of St Leonard More images
Church of St Andrew	Shilton, Rugby	Church	14th century	6 October 1960	SP4037884360; 52°27′21″N 1°24′26″W	1034857	Church of St Andrew More images
Newbold Revel	Stretton-under-Fosse, Rugby	House/Training College	1716	4 December 1951	SP4555280831; 52°25′25″N 1°19′54″W	1233638	Newbold Revel More images
Church of All Saints	Stretton-on-Dunsmore, Rugby	Church	1835-1837	6 October 1960	SP4069172522; 52°20′57″N 1°24′15″W	1185612	Church of All Saints More images
29th Division War Memorial	Stretton-on-Dunsmore	War memorial	1921	25 August 1987	SP4148673267	1034880	29th Division War Memorial More images
Church of St Leonard	Willey, Rugby	Church	Late C14/C15	6 October 1960	SP4966484802; 52°27′32″N 1°16′14″W	1116337	Church of St Leonard More images
Church of St Nicholas	Willoughby, Rugby	Church	Early 16th century	6 October 1960	SP5159267443; 52°18′10″N 1°14′41″W	1116454	Church of St Nicholas More images
Church of All Saints	Withybrook, Rugby	Church	14th century	6 October 1960	SP4369584136; 52°27′12″N 1°21′30″W	1034860	Church of All Saints More images
Church of St Peter and attached Mausoleum	Wolfhampcote, Rugby	Church	13th century	6 October 1960	SP5297165312; 52°17′00″N 1°13′30″W	1034927	Church of St Peter and attached Mausoleum More images
The Cottage Red Roof Farm	Sawbridge, Wolfhampcote, Rugby	House	C17-C19	3 July 1987	SP5034565794; 52°17′17″N 1°15′48″W	1034895	Upload Photo
The Priory	Wolston, Rugby	Timber Framed Building	Late C14/early 15th century	4 December 1951	SP4161675898; 52°22′46″N 1°23′24″W	1365082	The Priory More images
Church of St John the Baptist	Wolvey, Rugby	Church	12th century	6 October 1960	SP4307187983; 52°29′17″N 1°22′02″W	1116252	Church of St John the Baptist More images
Brownsover Hall	Brownsover, Rugby	House	Mid 19th century	3 September 1976	SP5072277538; 52°23′37″N 1°15′22″W	1365029	Brownsover Hall More images
Church of Saint Andrew	Rugby	Church	13th century	11 October 1949	SP5038575208; 52°22′21″N 1°15′41″W	1183695	Church of Saint Andrew More images
Church of Saint John the Baptist	Hillmorton, Rugby	Church	13th century	11 October 1949	SP5363274422; 52°21′55″N 1°12′50″W	1035023	Church of Saint John the Baptist More images
Church of Saint Michael and All Angels	Rugby	Church	13th century	11 October 1949	SP5086377372; 52°23′31″N 1°15′14″W	1183659	Church of Saint Michael and All Angels More images
Church of St Mark	Bilton, Rugby	Church	14th century	11 October 1949	SP4876173925; 52°21′40″N 1°17′07″W	1183705	Church of St Mark More images
Roman Catholic Church of St Marie	Rugby	Roman Catholic Church	1846-7	11 October 1949	SP5023674525; 52°21′59″N 1°15′49″W	1365006	Roman Catholic Church of St Marie More images
Lawrence Sheriff's House	Rugby	Timber Framed House	c. 1515	3 September 1976	SP5082777425; 52°23′33″N 1°15′16″W	1365001	Lawrence Sheriff's House More images
New Quad Buildings at Rugby School	Rugby	School	1867-85	11 October 1949	SP5020875004; 52°22′15″N 1°15′50″W	1035020	New Quad Buildings at Rugby School More images
Old Quad Buildings at Rugby School	Rugby	Wall	1748	11 October 1949	SP5026474992; 52°22′14″N 1°15′47″W	1035021	Old Quad Buildings at Rugby School More images
School House at Rugby School	Rugby	Teachers House	1809-13	11 October 1949	SP5029974950; 52°22′13″N 1°15′46″W	1183930	Upload Photo
War Memorial Chapel at Rugby School	Rugby	Chapel	1922	11 October 1949	SP5019874936; 52°22′13″N 1°15′51″W	1365005	War Memorial Chapel at Rugby School More images
32 Bilton Road	Rugby	Detached House	Early 19th century	3 September 1976	SP4981074925; 52°22′12″N 1°16′11″W	1035039	Upload Photo
British Thomson-Houston Co Ltd War Memorial	Rugby	War memorial	1921	7 June 2007	52°13′44″N 1°09′14″W	1392027	British Thomson-Houston Co Ltd War Memorial More images
