= River Swift =

River in Leicestershire and Warwickshire, England

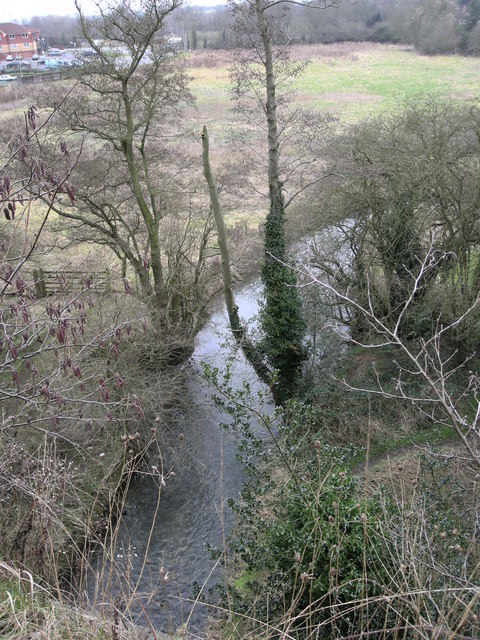
- River Swift near Lutterworth

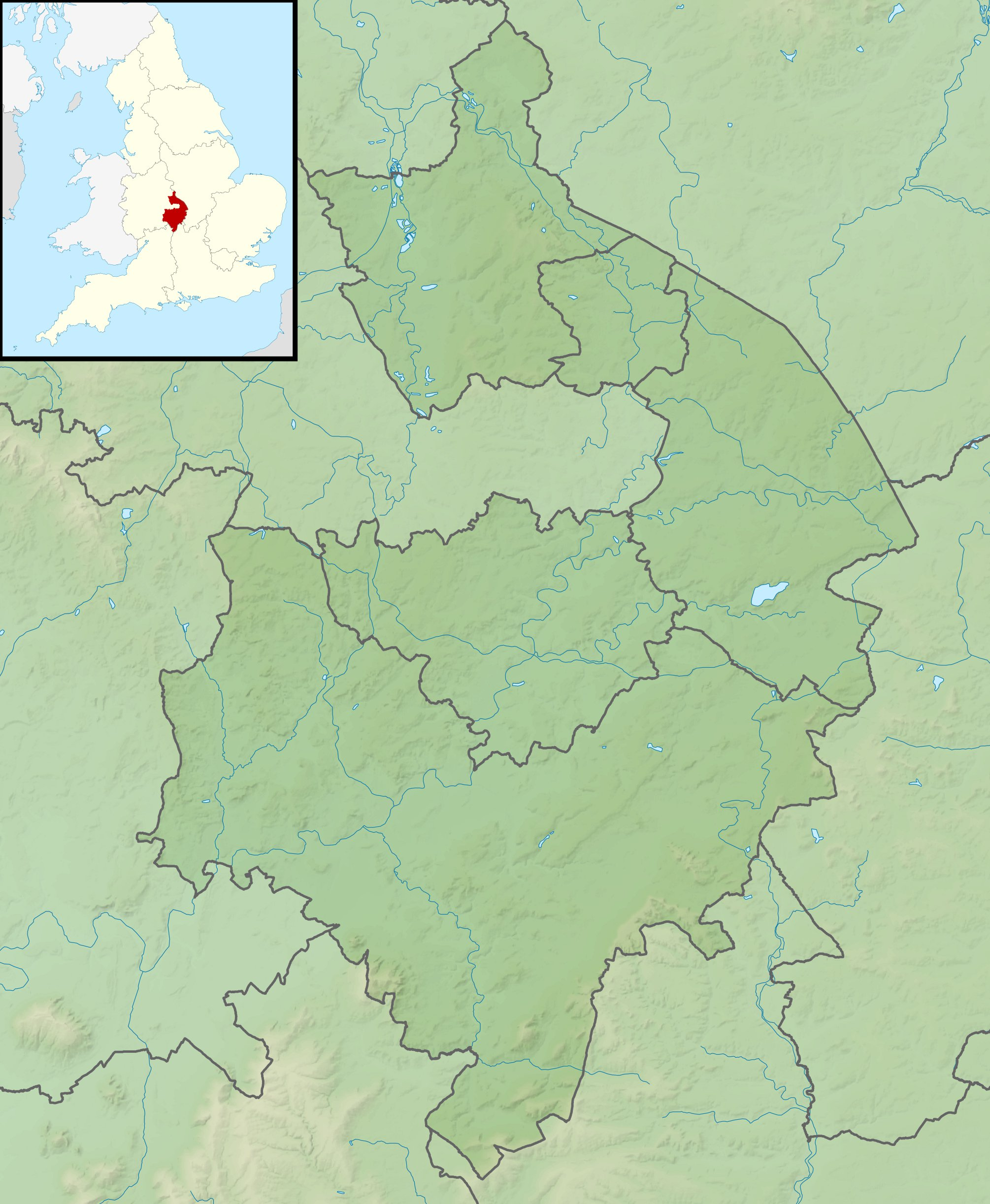
- Location of the mouth within Warwickshire

Location
- Country: England
- Counties: Leicestershire, Warwickshire
- Towns: Lutterworth, Rugby

Physical characteristics
- Source
  - location: Upper Bruntingthorpe, Leicestershire
- Mouth: Confluence with River Avon
  - location: Rugby, Warwickshire
  - coordinates: 52.3869°N 1.2588°W
- Length: 23 km (14 mi)
- Basin size: 80 km^{2} (31 sq mi)

The River Swift is a 14-mile (23 km) long tributary of the River Avon that rises in south Leicestershire, and flows through the town of Lutterworth before joining the Avon at its confluence at Rugby in Warwickshire in the English Midlands.

== Course ==
The source of the river is a stream that rises at an altitude of 142 metres (466 ft) near to Bruntingthorpe Aerodrome in Leicestershire, on the watershed division between the Avon and Soar catchments. The Swift passes the village of Walton and then Kimcote, where it meets a number of small streams that drain the headwaters of the catchment. The river continues in a south-westerly direction, passing to the north of Walcote then through the Misterton Marshes, a Site of Special Scientific Interest, before reaching the M1 motorway bridge and the town of Lutterworth.

The river passes to the south of the town, where it is crossed by the Rugby road, near to the site of the ‘lost’ St Johns the Baptist hospital. After passing beneath the Lutterworth bypass, the Swift continues south-west until it reaches the Bransford Bridge crossing under the A5. This road follows the course of Watling Street, the Roman road that linked London to Wroxeter.

Downstream of the bridge the river passes the site of the deserted medieval village of Cestersover, and then the modern village of Churchover. At this point a canal feeder takes water from the river to supply the nearby canal. After passing beneath the M6 motorway, and past the hamlet of Cosford, the river then flows directly south through the Swift Valley Nature Reserve, passes Brownsover Hall and then through the Swift Valley industrial estate. It is crossed by the Oxford Canal on an aqueduct, and then passes a retail park to join the River Avon, between Brownsover and Rugby.

The River Swift connected to the original route of the Oxford Canal near Cosford in order to feed water to the canal. In 1785 there was a proposal to make the river navigable from Cosford to Lutterworth by the construction of flash locks. This proposal however never came to fruition. The River Swift is still an important feeder to the northern Oxford Canal.

== Catchment ==
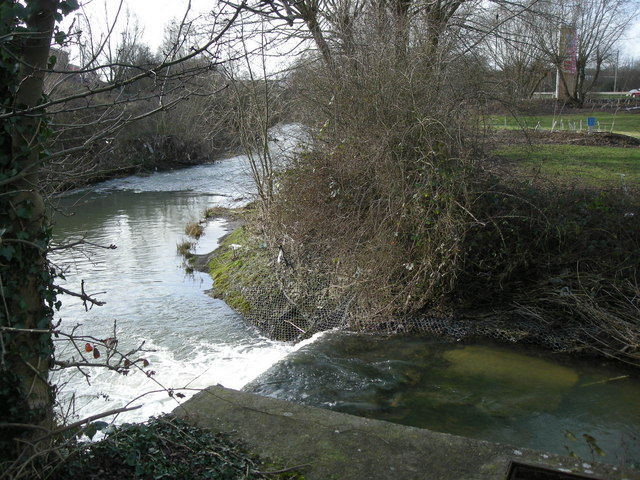
The Swift joins the Avon in Rugby

The Swift catchment lies between that of the Avon and Welland to the east, the River Sowe to the west, and the River Soar and its tributaries to the north, it covers an area of 80 square kilometres (31 sq mi).

In terms of geology of the catchment is underlain primarily by Lias Clay and mudstones, with an overlying layer of glacially deposited till, sands and gravels. This impermeable clay means that the Swift can become responsive in terms of runoff to heavy rainfall events.

== Flooding ==
The Swift has a minor history of flooding along its course, especially in Lutterworth, flood events being recorded in 1875, 1931 and most recently in 2008. A flood warning and alert service exists for the catchment, in conjunction with that for the Upper Avon and the Clay Coton brook.

In February 2012, a mother and her three children had to be rescued from their car when it was swept downstream from the ford between Churchover and Harborough Magna, after it had broken down in the floodwaters whilst crossing the river.

== History ==
Following the condemnation of John Wycliffe by the Catholic Church at the Council of Constance as a heretic, the Council decreed that his body and bones were to be exhumed and scattered far from a burial place of the church, in accordance with canonical and lawful sanctions. After some delay, his remains were burned and his ashes were drowned in the River Swift, which flows through Lutterworth.

== See also ==
- List of rivers of England
- Swift Valley Nature Reserve
