= St Michael and All Angels Church, Brownsover =

Coordinates: 52.3920°N 1.2540°W

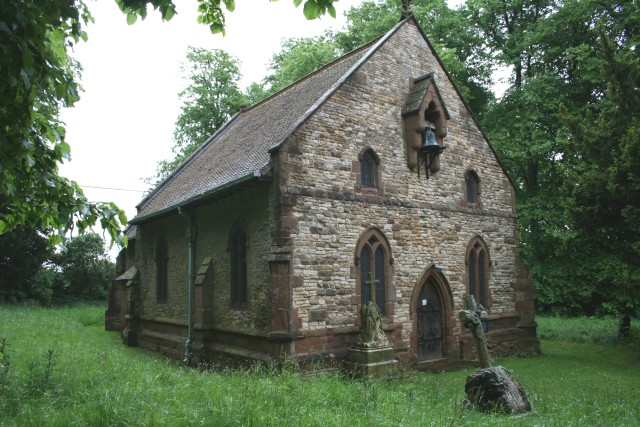
- St Michael and All Angels Church, Brownsover, from the southwest

- Location in Warwickshire
- OS grid reference: SP 508 773
- Location: Brownsover, Rugby, Warwickshire
- Country: England
- Denomination: Anglican
- Website: Churches Conservation Trust

History
- Dedication: St Michael and All Angels

Architecture
- Functional status: Redundant
- Architect: Sir George Gilbert Scott (restoration)
- Architectural type: Church
- Style: Gothic
- Groundbreaking: 13th century

Specifications
- Materials: Stone, clay tile roof

Listed Building – Grade II*
- Official name: Church of Saint Michael and All Angels
- Designated: 11 October 1949
- Reference no.: 1183659

St Michael and All Angels Church is a redundant Anglican church in the former village of Brownsover, which is now a suburb of the town of Rugby, Warwickshire, England. It is recorded in the National Heritage List for England as a designated Grade II* listed building, and is under the care of the Churches Conservation Trust.

== History ==
St Michael's originated in the 13th century as a chapel of ease to the parish of Clifton-upon-Dunsmore. Windows were added to the church later in the same century, and more were added in the following two centuries. After the Reformation, buttresses and a west porch were added. In 1876 the church was restored by Sir George Gilbert Scott for Allesley Boughton-Leigh of nearby Brownsover Hall. The restoration amounted almost to a rebuilding of the church, but it was done in a sympathetic manner. In the early 20th century, new stained glass was inserted in the east window. The church was declared redundant on 10 February 1987 and became vested in the Churches Conservation Trust.

== Architecture ==
=== Exterior ===
The church is constructed in cream-coloured stone, with reddish-brown freestone dressings. The roof is in clay tiles. Its plan is simple, consisting of a nave with a smaller chancel. The nave measures 30 feet (9.1 m) by 24 feet 9 inches (7.5 m), and the chancel 19 feet 6 inches (5.9 m) by 13 feet 3 inches (4.0 m). There is a small brick extension at the northeast corner between the nave and the chancel. The west end is gabled with diagonal buttresses and a string course. The church is entered by a west doorway with a pointed arch, on each side of which are two-light windows. Above these windows are smaller single-light windows, and between them is a gabled bracket holding a bell. There are two two-light windows on the north and south sides of the nave, with a buttress between them. There is a lancet window in the east wall of the nave. The chancel has diagonal buttresses, and a three-light east window. On its north side is a paired lancet window, and on the south is a similar window plus a single lancet.

=== Interior ===
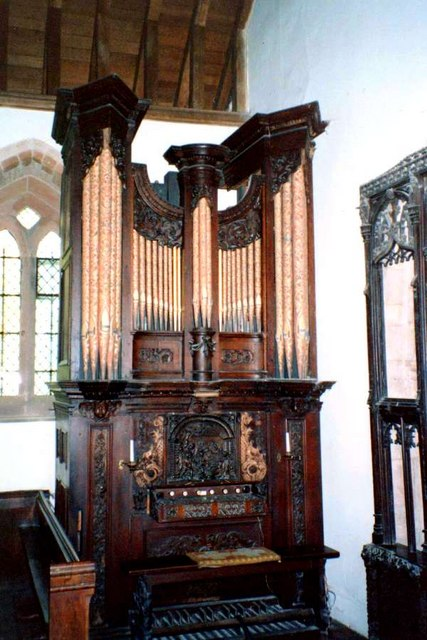
Organ case

The interior is mainly plastered and whitewashed. It is floored with 19th-century polychrome tiles. In the south wall is a piscina. The font is circular and dates from the 13th century. The east window contains 20th-century stained glass commemorating Lawrence Sheriff, the founder of Rugby School. All the other windows contain plain glass. In the church is a rectangular wooden screen dating from the 15th century and later. The wooden pulpit is Flemish, dating from the 18th century, and is set into the east wall of the nave. The organ case is German and highly decorated. It was made in 1660, originally for St John's College, Cambridge, and was moved here in the late 19th century. The single-manual organ was built in 1876 by the Bryceson Brothers.

== See also ==
- List of churches preserved by the Churches Conservation Trust in the English Midlands
