= William Holland (stained glass maker) =

19th-century British decorative artist

William Holland (c.1802 – September 27, 1883) was a 19th-century British maker of stained glass and other decorative pieces. His work is represented in churches and stately homes across England, Wales, and Ireland. Holland of Warwick windows can be identified by his mark "Guil Holland Vaivic. Puix " written on a scroll in Latin in the lower right hand corner. Holland's stained glass reflects the influence of the Cambridge Camden Society and the Gothic Revival work of Thomas Willement. Willement revived in the early 19th century, the method used at York Minster to build the Great East Window in 1400 wherein coloured pieces are leaded and the lead then becomes part of the design, appearing as black lines in the window.

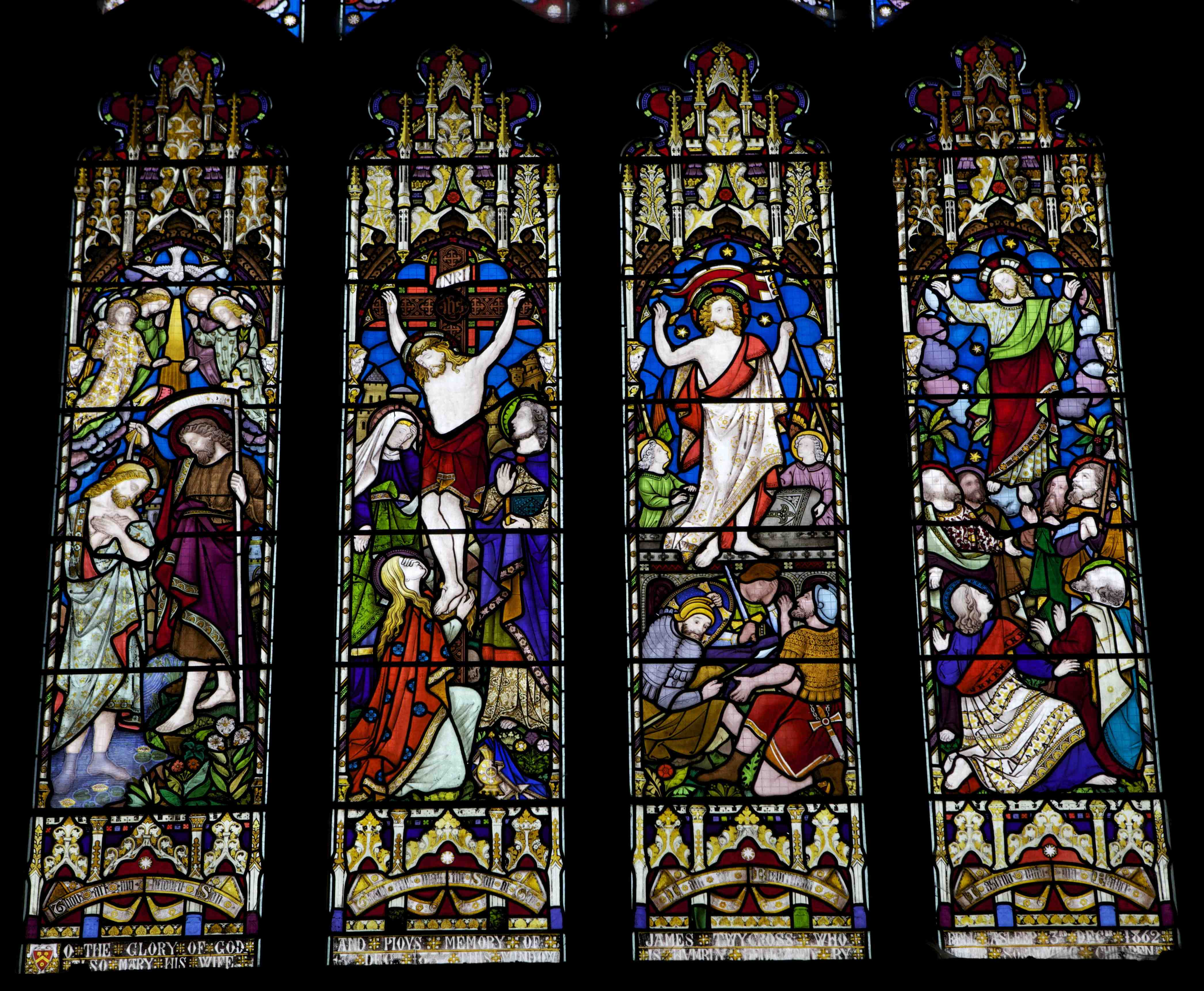
William Holland stained glass window, showing his mark "H&S" for Holland and Sons in lower right hand corner

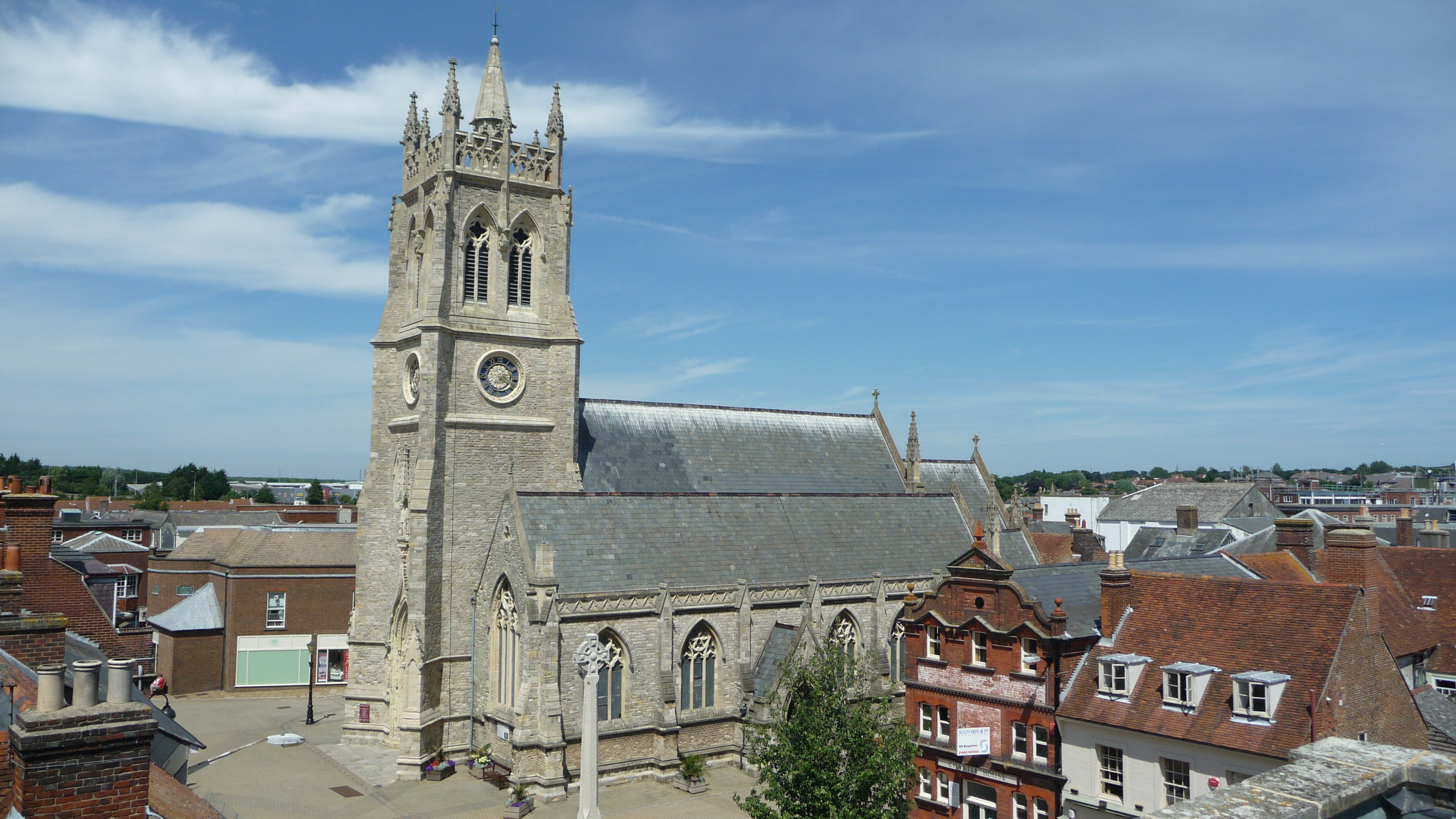
Newport St Thomas' Church in July 2010

== Studio and business ==
In 1828, Holland had established himself as a painter and plumber in Wallace Street, Warwick. By 1832, he was working out of a studio in Smith Street, Warwick.

In 1847, Holland commissioned the building of a family residence and glassworks studio at 3 Priory Road - then called Oil Mill Lane - on the intersection with St John’s, Warwick. The firm was initially marketed as Midland Counties Stained Glass and Decorative Works, Saint John's, Warwick. Described as “Designers and Producers. Stained glass of the twelfth century representing scriptural events."

Other 19th century sources quote his work as Elizabethan style. Again as a "stained glass and decorative painting establishment, where every description of design for monumental and baronial windows, enamelled and encaustic painting, gilding, imitations of wood" was executed.

At his studio, Holland also trained family members and other well known makers of stained glass, such as Clement Heaton. In 1855 Heaton joined James Butler to start his own company in London.

The original buildings still stand; a yellow house on the corner, which was the Holland’s family home. The house is still attached to a long brick building, now the Museum of the Queen’s Royal Hussars, which was Holland's workshop.

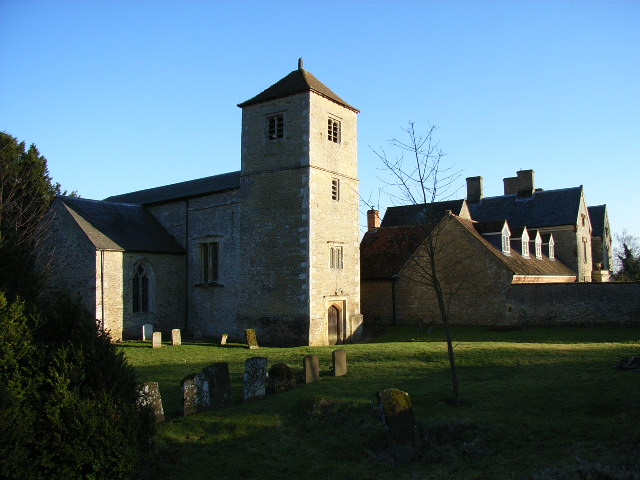
Church And Priory Chetwode

== Studio in later years ==
William's son, Thomas followed in his father’s footsteps, and along with William’s nephew, Frank Holt (1843–1928), continued the firm after William’s retirement in 1873, then known as Holland & Holt.

Thomas left shortly afterwards and the studio continued on as Holt of Warwick. In the 1881 census, Frank Holt’s occupation is listed as Master Glass Painter, employing 22 men and 6 boys.

Peter Auguste Fischer, aged 20 years, is also listed as an apprentice glass painter, living with the Holt family. Fischer went on to become renowned stained glass artist in his own right. After emigrating to Australia, he completed work in Australia, New Zealand, China and South Africa.

Holt of Warwick continued into the early years of the twentieth century.

== Representation at Great Exhibition ==
William Holland's stained glass was exhibited at the Great Exhibition of 1851 which was held in Hyde Park, London, from 1 May to 15 October, and is found in the Official Catalogue . The catalogue lists exhibitors and also a description of various methods used to produce stained glass windows. Glass is found in Section III, Class 24.

Holland is listed in entry 63 in the catalogue as working in various styles:

- the twelfth century style : illustrating scriptural events,
- the decorative style as in Wellesbourne church
- stained glass of the fifteenth century; perpendicular style for Shuckburgh Church
- stained glass in the Elizabethan style : emblazoned arms of the Queen of England from the present day up to the present period.

He was one of 25 makers of stained glass listed.

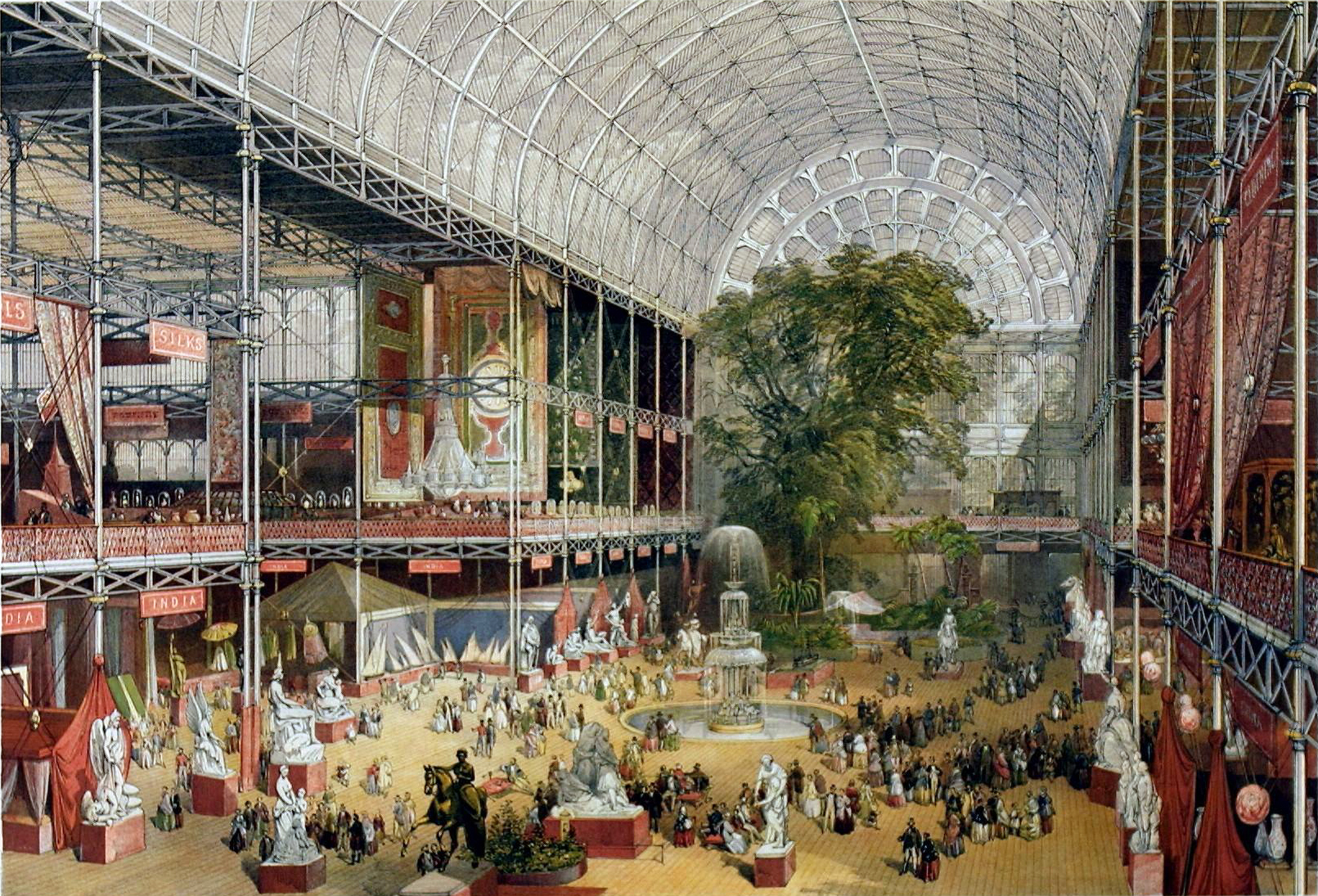
Great Exhibition, 1851. Stained glass on left, lining eastern walls in Central North Gallery

Stained Glass was exhibited lining the eastern walls of the Central North gallery of the Crystal Palace. Around 1845 there was a revival of interest in all types of worked glass, reflected in the choice of panes of sheet or window glass 49 inches long to cover the exhibition halls. "It has been a popular notion that this art was lost to us; such is not the case, it has indeed been dormant, but never extinct. The fine works exhibited this year (1851) - the production of living artists- announce its revival." This was the first time that stained glass was exhibited in an extraordinary setting that emphasized its artistry in addition to religious themes. Displays were set up to explain the process of glass making. A batch of flint glass was made from one part alkali, two parts lead, and three parts sand with the best quality sand found at Alum Bay, Isle of Wight and Aylesbury, Buckinghamshire . "The materials are mixed and then melted in a crucible made of fire clay, a substance that can withstand intense, prolonged heat. Melting takes 60 hours. At 12 hours the glass is honeycombed and very white and opaque and a few hours later is transparent with thousands of air bubbles, which eventually disappear along with the light purple tint: that is oxygen given off by the oxide of manganese. Tools are then used to manipulate the glass." Flashed (two layers of colour) and stained glass are coloured on the surface only and through a process of embossing the white surface beneath is revealed. This was the process most likely used by Holland to illustrate his windows.

== Stained glass in the nineteenth century ==
During the English Civil War in the 17th century Oliver Cromwell, a zealous Puritan, fought King Charles I and as part of this campaign, rampaged against the traditional Loyalist church and its ornate trappings. His troops broke down the heavy doors of parish churches near and far, and rode on horseback through their interiors, destroying with their swords anything decorative. Priceless and ancient stained glass windows were shattered and the churches were laid bare to the elements through empty window frames. In the Nineteenth century the Anglican church became interested in what had been lost: there were a few examples of medieval and Elizabethan windows that had survived this earlier devastation. William Holland's stained glass windows strongly reflect his interest in this period as he described his work to be "Stained glass of the twelfth century representing scriptural events." Religious revivals also influenced architecture and were the motivating factor in rebuilding churches. During a flowering period of reconstruction, older windows with plain glass and leading were replaced. See also British and Irish stained glass (1811–1918) and the Cambridge Camden Society.

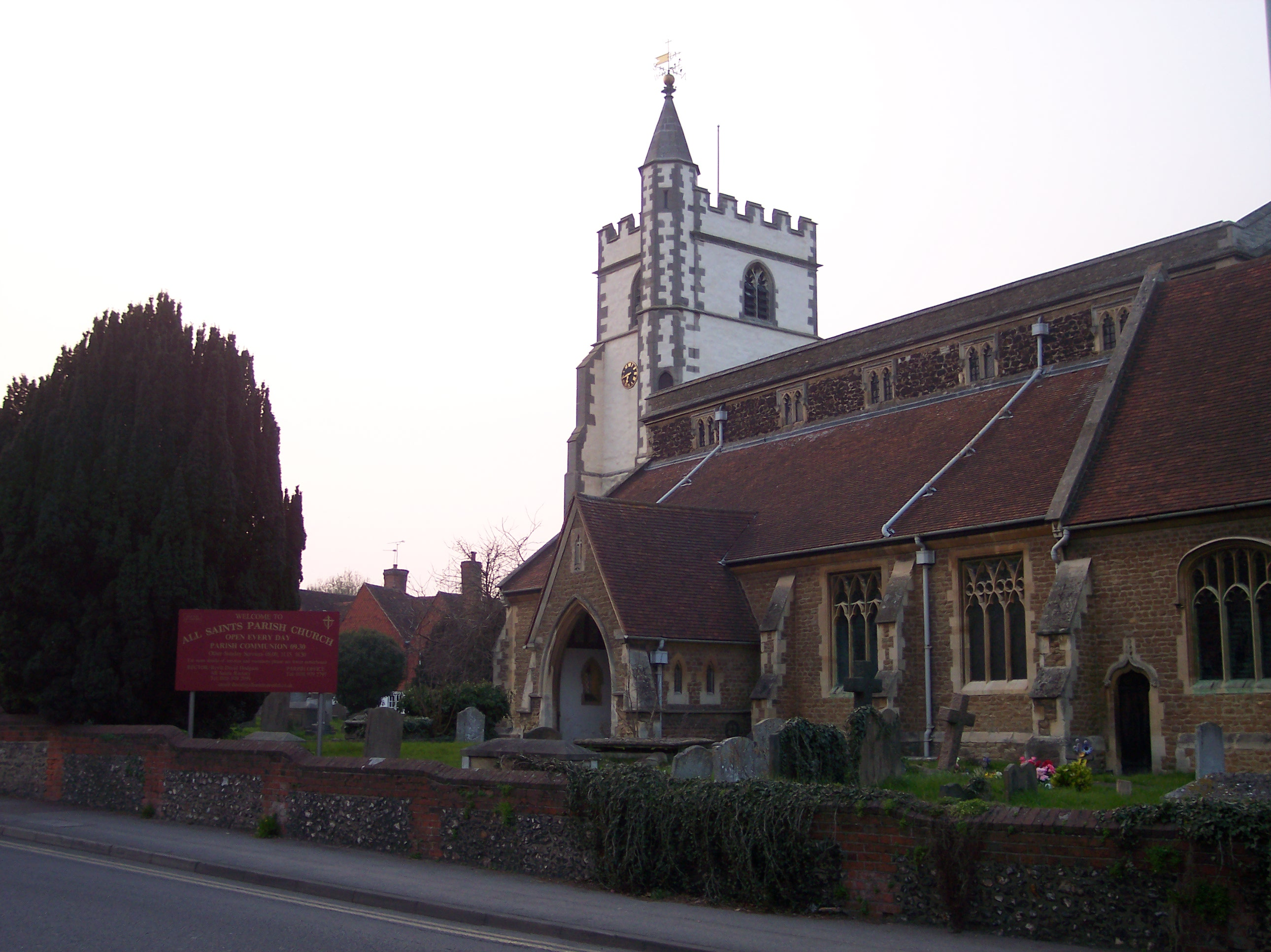
All Saints Church Wokingham

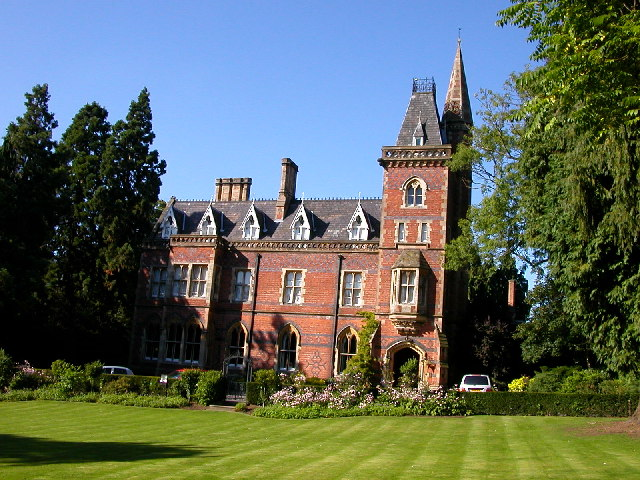
Brownsover Hall

== Examples of Holland Studio stained glass windows ==
- Sts Thomas Minster Church Newport IOW (A Minster church)
- All Saints Church Wokingham
- St James, Twycross, Leicestershire
- St Peter's Church, Diocese of Coventry
- Chetwode, St Mary & St Nicholas
- St Mary & All Saints, Haselor, Warwickshire
- St. Peter's Church, Barford, Warwickshire
- St Margaret's Church Whitnash, Warwickshire
- St Peter's Church, Wellesbourne, Warwickshire
- St Collen’s Church, Llangollen, Denbighshire, Wales
- Church of St Peter ad Vincula, Pennal, Gwynedd, Wales (Holland and Holt)
- Christ Church, Taney Dundrum, Ireland.
- Christ Church, Bray, Ireland
- Brownsover Hall, Rugby, Warwickshire
- St Michael's Church, Budbrooke, Warwickshire
- St Michael's Church, Stockton, Warwickshire
- Nativity of Mary Church, Studley, Warwickshire
- SS Peter & Paul Church, Butlers Marston, Warwickshire
- All Saints Church, Royal Leamington Spa, Warwickshire
- Library/Former Chapel, Princethorpe College, Warwickshire
- St Andrew's Church, North Kilworth, Leicestershire
- Collegiate Church of St Mary, Warwick, south west window of chancel

== Church of Ireland ==
Christ Church, Taney Dundrum incorporates a set of windows signed " Holland, Son & Holt, Glass Painters, Decorators, &c., Warwick, England, 1872."and "Studio William Holland; Warwick ".

In the EAST Sanctuary a very large stained glass window is described as "Five lancets each measuring 3760mm x 560mm; rose of one 6-foil and ten quatrefoils; two large mouchettes and several small lights."

Iconography: King Solomon Building the Temple

Moses in the Bullrushes

Moses and the Brazen Serpent

Elijah Ascending to Heaven

Abraham Sacrificing Isaac

King Solomon in the Temple

Moses and the Tables of the Law

The SOUTH Sanctuary displays "One lancet measuring 2840mm x 560mm. "

Iconography:Visiting the Prisoner

In the NORTH; EAST chancel are "Two lancets, each measuring 2950mm x 560mm, one quatrefoil and two mouchettes. "

Iconography:Taking in the Stranger- on left

Clothing the Naked- on right

In the NORTH; WEST chancel are "Two lancets each measuring 2950x560 mm, one quatrefoil and two small mouchettes. "

Iconography:Feeding the Hungry- on left

Giving Drink to the Thirsty- on right
