= Parish chest =

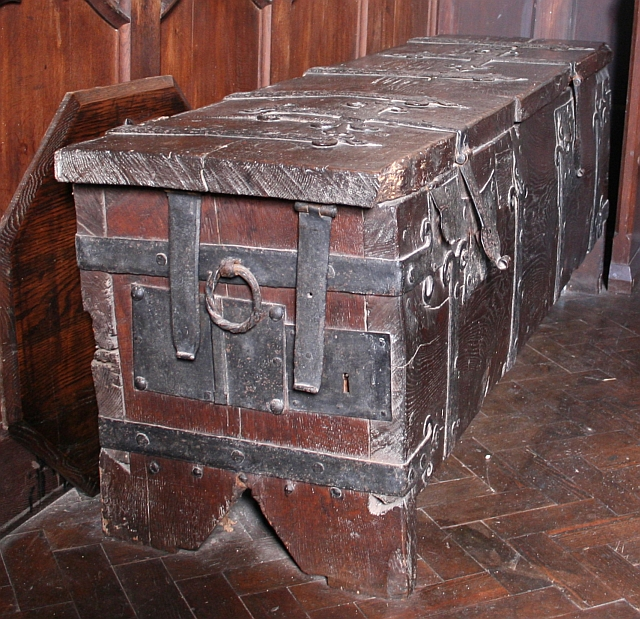
Parish chest, Mathon Church, near to Mathon, Herefordshire, Dated 1698, but understood to be much older.

In England and Wales, a parish chest is a wooden chest which was used for the storage of important documents relating to a parish, these would typically include the parish register of births, deaths and marriages, and other documents relating to the administration of the parish. A parish chest would usually be kept in the parish church.

Parish chests were used from medieval times, and early ones were usually simple, constructed from a hollowed out log. In later centuries, parish chests generally became more elaborate, and incorporated features such metal bands and multiple locks.

== Examples ==
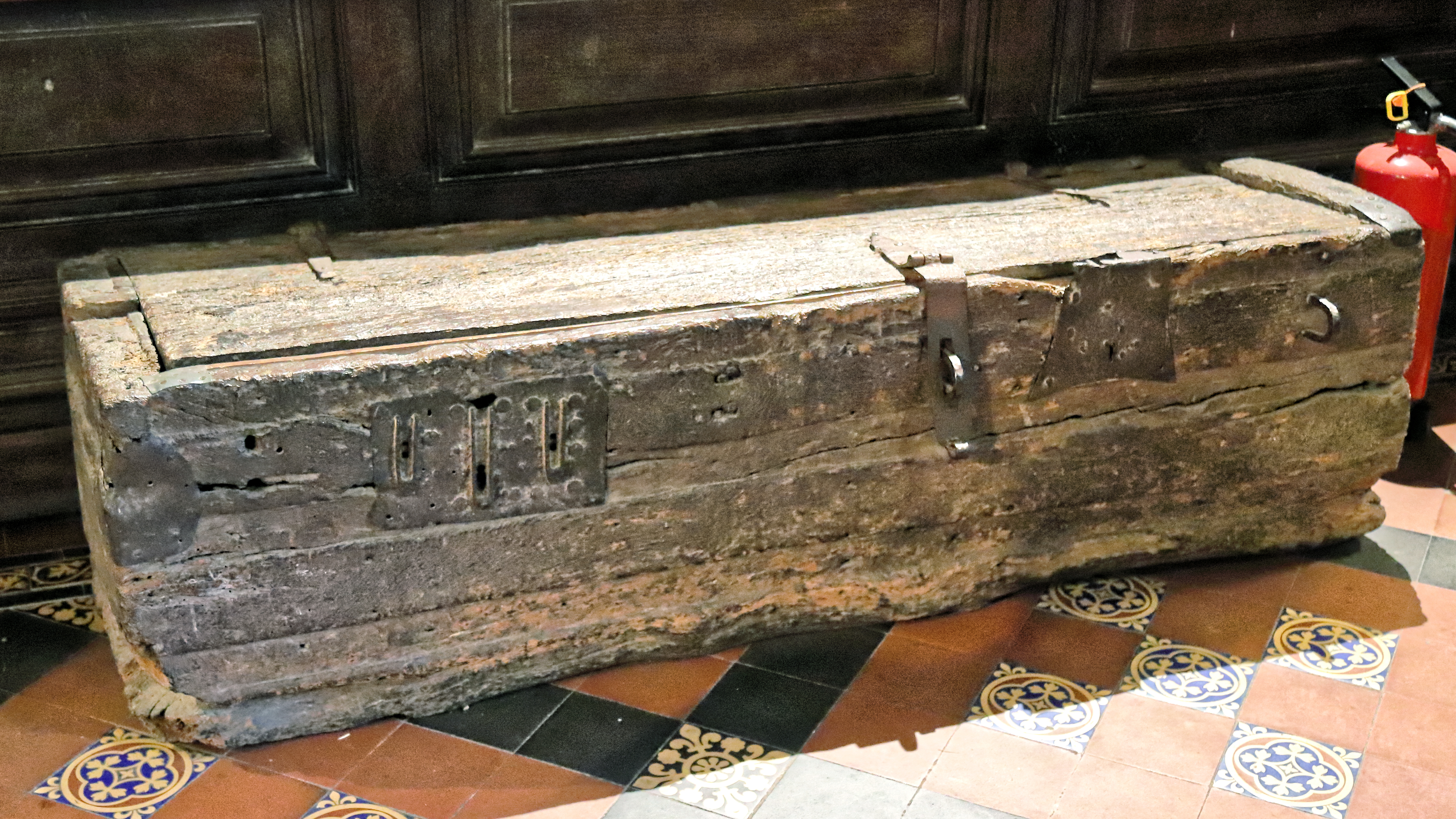
A 13th-century parish chest, dug-out from one trunk of wood, in St Andrew's Church in the village of Nuthurst, West Sussex, England

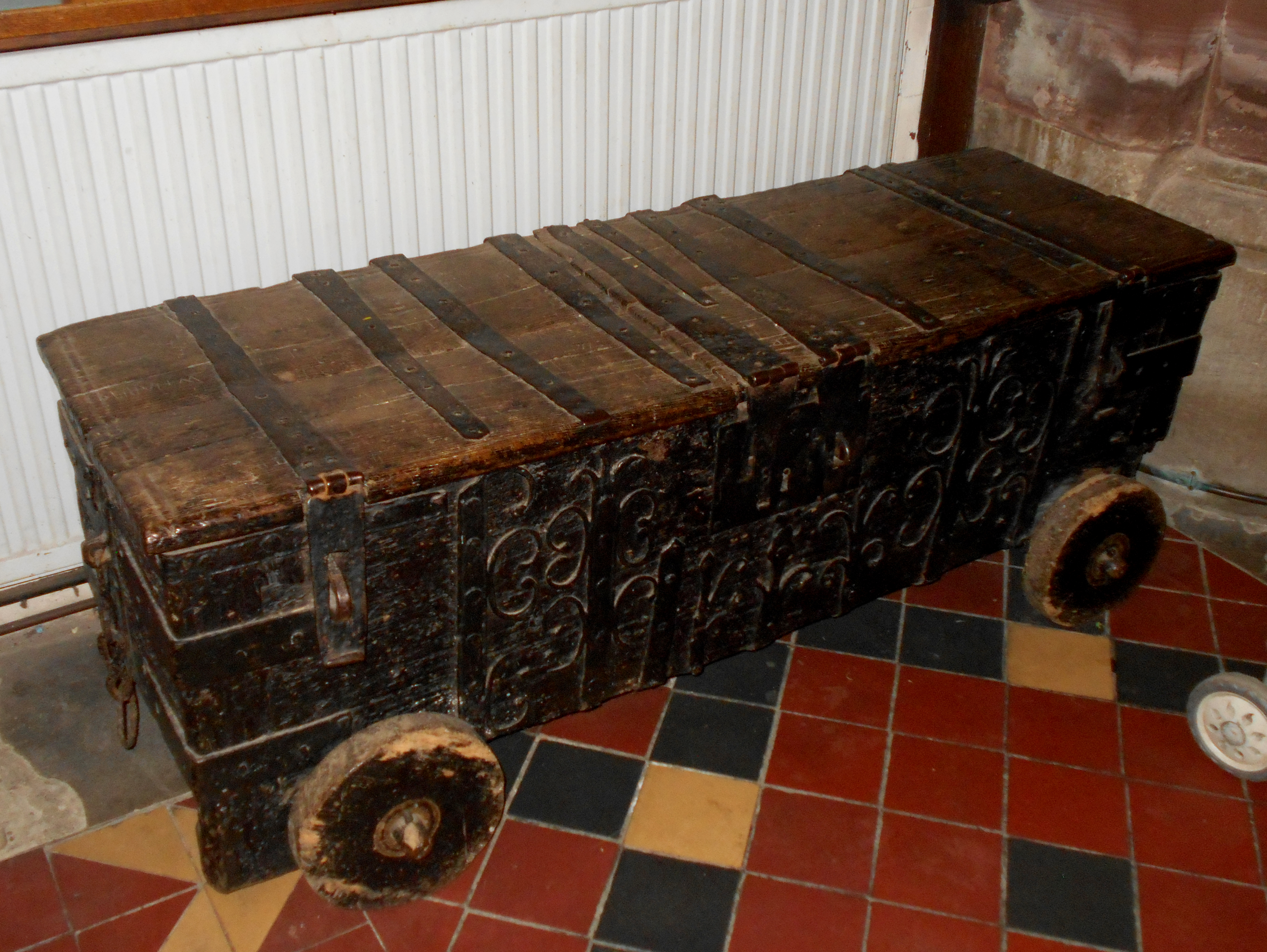
Medieval parish chest on wheels, St Andrew's Church, Rugby

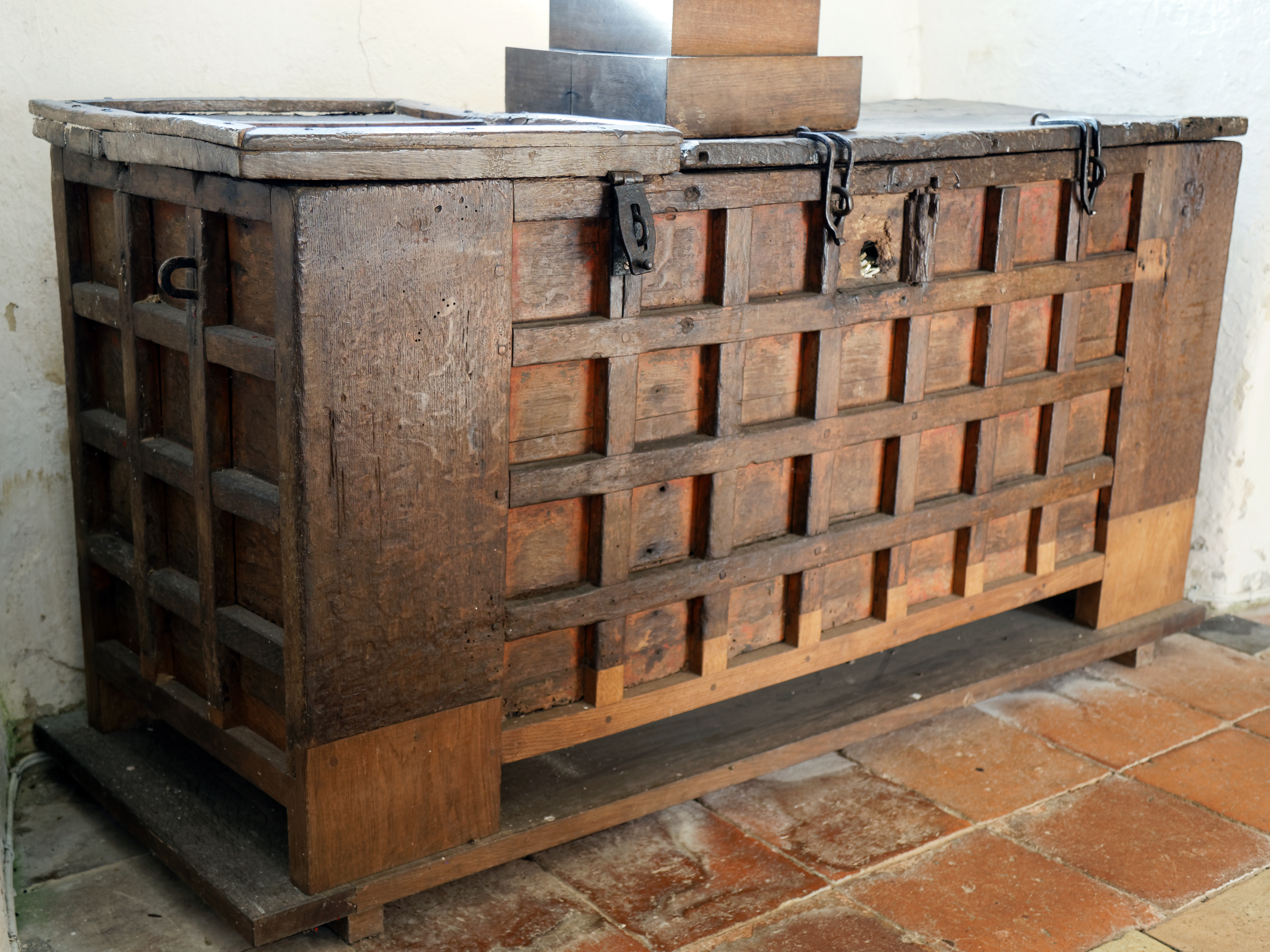
The parish chest in the tower of the Church of St Peter and St Thomas Becket, in Stambourne, Essex, England
