= British Thomson-Houston Company War Memorial =

- United Kingdom
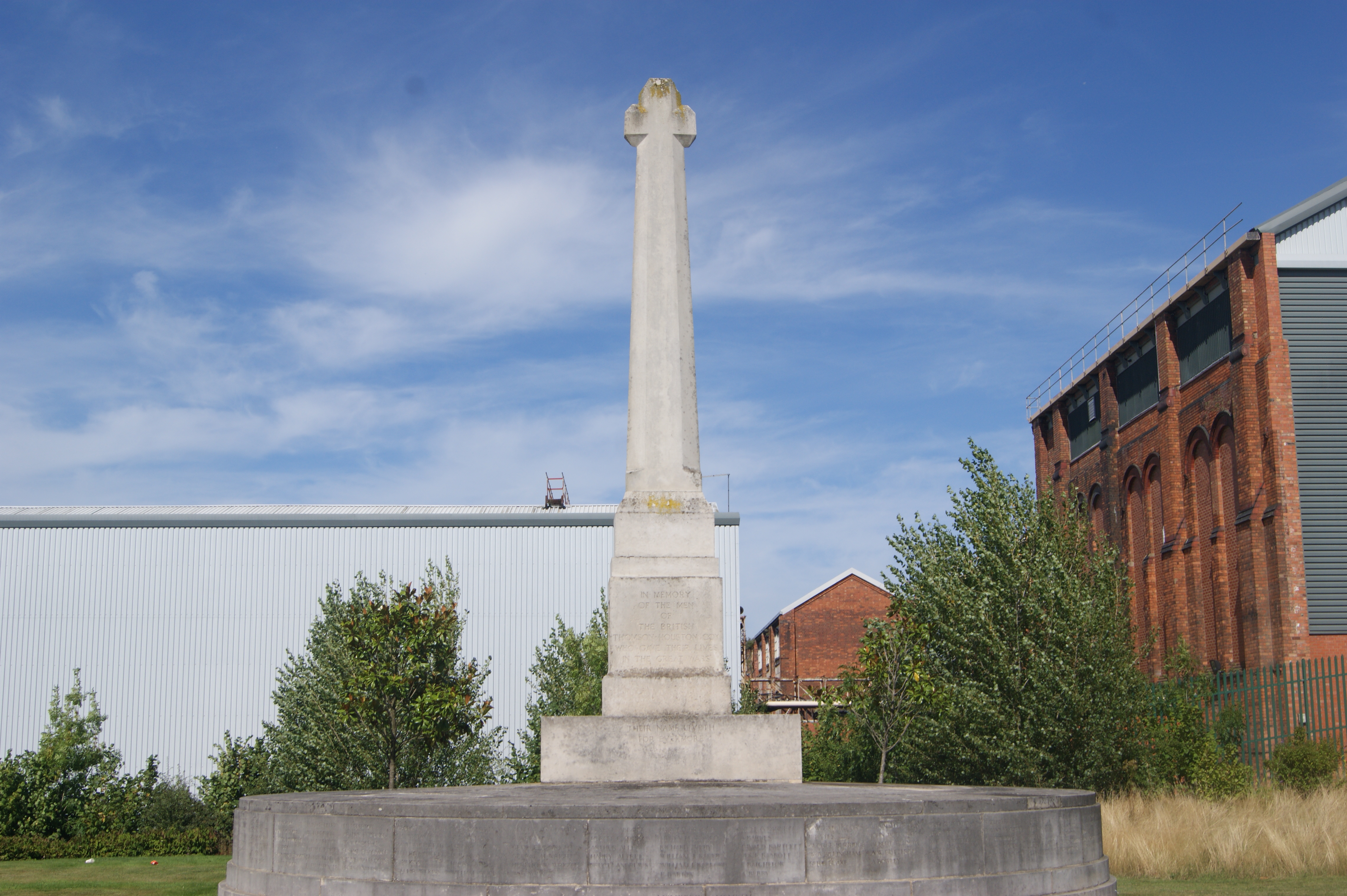
- For workers from the British Thomson-Houston Company killed in the First World War
- Unveiled: 1921
- Location: 52.382745°N 1.255124°W; Technology Drive, Rugby, Warwickshire
- Designed by: Sir Edwin Lutyens
- IN MEMORY OF THE MEN OF THE BRITISH THOMSON-HOUSTON COY WHO GAVE THEIR LIVES IN THE GREAT WARS

Listed Building – Grade II*
- Official name: British Thomson-Houston Company War Memorial
- Designated: 13 June 2007
- Reference no.: 1392027

The British Thomson-Houston Company War Memorial is a First World War memorial in Rugby, Warwickshire, in the West Midlands of England. It was erected by the British Thomson-Houston Company in memory of the firm's employees who left to fight in the First World War and were killed in service. Designed by Sir Edwin Lutyens, it was unveiled in 1921 and is now a grade II* listed building.

== Background ==
In the aftermath of the First World War and its unprecedented casualties, thousands of war memorials were built across Britain. Amongst the most prominent designers of memorials was the architect Sir Edwin Lutyens, described by Historic England as "the leading English architect of his generation". Lutyens designed the Cenotaph on Whitehall in London, which became the focus of the national Remembrance Sunday commemorations, as well as the Thiepval Memorial to the Missing—the largest British war memorial anywhere in the world—and the Stone of Remembrance which appears in all large Commonwealth War Graves Commission cemeteries and in several of Lutyens's civic war memorials. The Thomson-Houston Company memorial is one of 15 War Crosses by Lutyens, all of which share a similar design.

British Thomson-Houston was an engineering firm based in Rugby, majority owned by General Electric. During the First World War, the Rugby factory produced components for the Royal Navy, including signalling and radio equipment. The memorial is dedicated to the 243 company employees who were killed fighting in the First World War and was later rededicated to include 175 employees killed in the Second World War.

The British Thomson-Houston memorial was one of six war memorials designed by Lutyens for a private company, the others being the large Midland Railway and North Eastern Railway memorials in Derby and York respectively, and smaller indoor memorials for Imperial Tobacco, the London Assurance Company, and Lloyd's of London.

== History and design ==
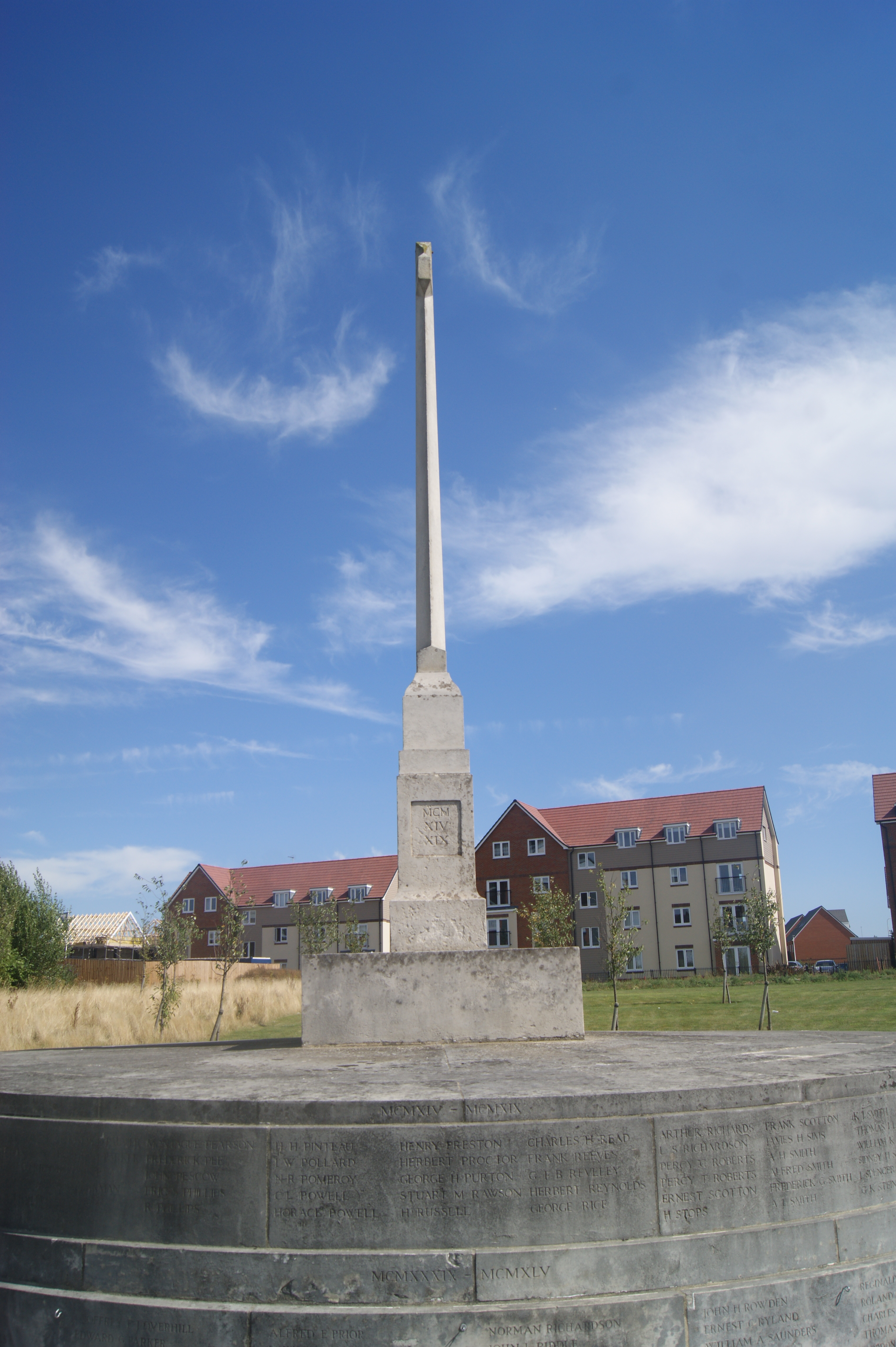
View from the side showing the names inscribed on the plinth

The board of the British Thomson-Houston Company met in April 1921 and delegated responsibility for commissioning a suitable war memorial to its chairman. The memorial was unveiled six months later on 29 October 1921 by Field Marshal Sir William Robertson and dedicated by the Archdeacon of Warwick. During construction, undertaken by local builders' firm J Parnell & Son Ltd, a time capsule containing information about the company and its war records was buried beneath the memorial. the total cost of erecting the memorial was £3,243 (1921).

Following Lutyens' War Cross design, the British Thomson-Houston Company War Memorial consists of a single cross, 7.3 metres (24 feet) high in Portland stone, with short arms set near the top of the tapering shaft. The cross is moulded to a base of four uneven square steps and a square plinth, which itself sits on a 7.5 metres (25 feet) diameter plinth—making it unusual among Lutyens' memorials. The main inscription on the monument, on the square plinth, reads "IN MEMORY OF THE MEN OF THE BRITISH THOMSON-HOUSTON COY WHO GAVE THEIR LIVES IN THE GREAT WARS", with the dates of the two world wars inscribed to either side; below is the dedication "THEIR NAME LIVETH FOR EVERMORE". The names of the fallen are recorded on the round plinth.

When unveiled, the memorial sat at the former entrance to the British Thomson-Houston factory on Mill Road. The site was redeveloped in 2010 and the memorial was relocated to a site around 400 metres (1,300 feet) away on Technology Drive, formerly occupied by the firm's electrical engineering works.

The memorial was designated a grade II listed building on 13 June 2007. In October 2015, as part of commemorations for the centenary of the First World War, Lutyens' war memorials were recognised as a "national collection" and all of his free-standing memorials in England were listed or had their listing status reviewed and their National Heritage List for England list entries were updated and expanded. As part of this process, the British Thomson-Houston Company War Memorial was upgraded to grade II* listed building status.

== See also ==
- Grade II* listed buildings in Rugby (borough)
- Grade II* listed war memorials in England
