= 29th Division War Memorial =

War memorial in Stretton-on-Dunsmore, Warwickshire, England

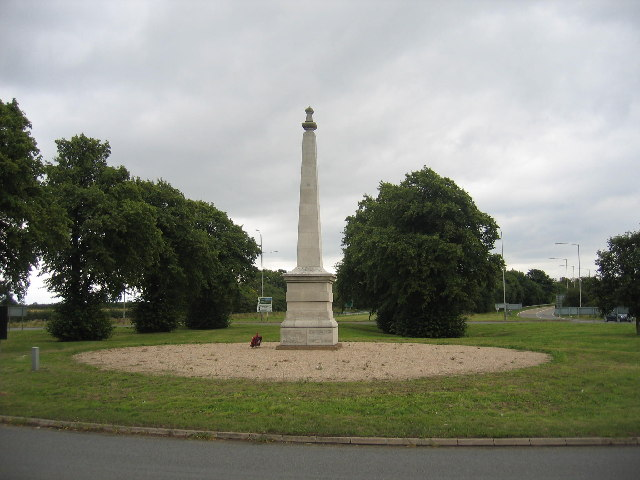
- Interactive map of 29th Division War Memorial
- 52.35592°N 1.39226°W
- Location: Stretton-on-Dunsmore, Warwickshire, England

Listed Building – Grade II*
- Official name: 29th Division War Memorial
- Designated: 25 August 1987
- Reference no.: 1034880

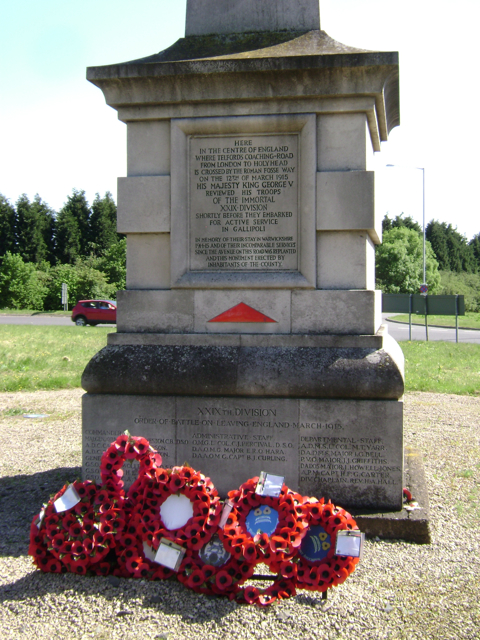
Inscription in 2009

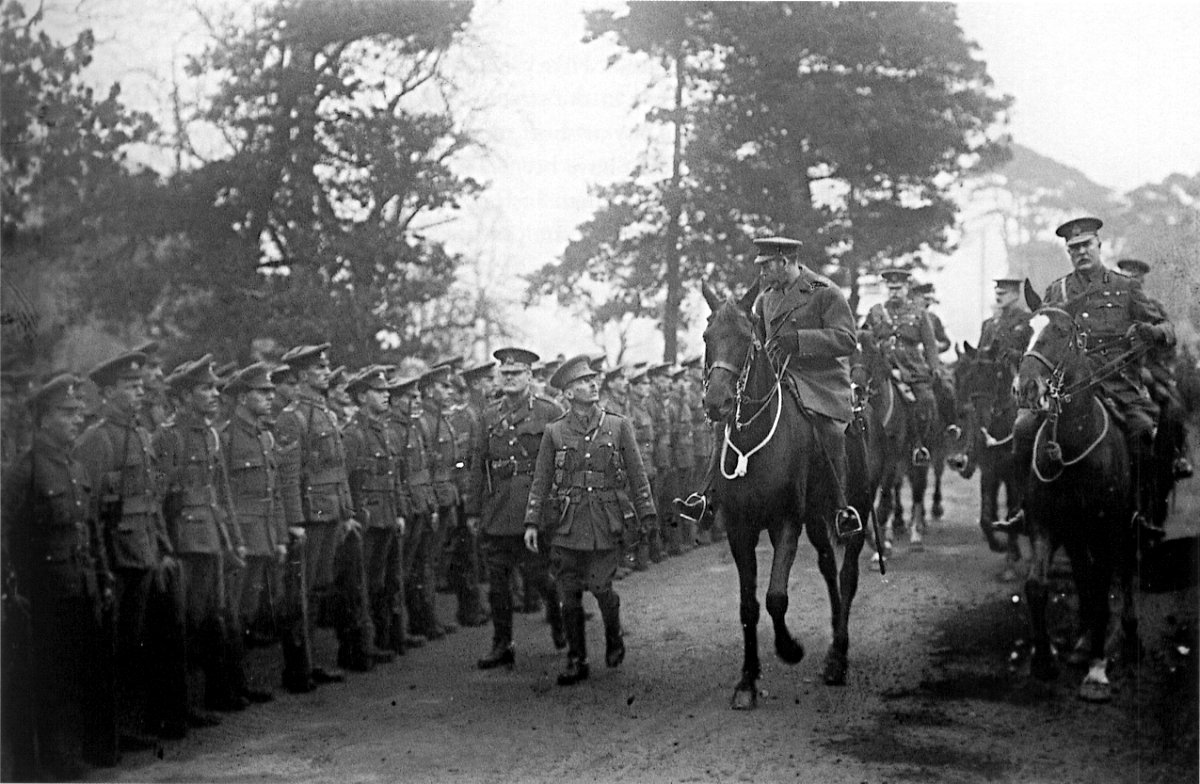
King George V inspects the 29th Division in 1915.

The 29th Division War Memorial is a war memorial beside the junction of the A45 and the B4455 near Stretton-on-Dunsmore, near Rugby, Warwickshire. It commemorates the service of the British 29th Division during the First World War. The memorial became a Grade II listed building in 1987, upgraded to Grade II* in 2015, and it is described by Historic England as "probably the most significant single memorial in Britain associated with the Gallipoli campaign".

== Background ==
The 29th Division was assembled in the East Midlands from late 1914, from largely regular army units returned from garrison duty in various parts of the British Empire. Approximately 18,000 servicemen paraded near Rugby on 12 March 1915, formed into a marching column approximately 2 miles (3.2 km) long which was reviewed by the King, George V. The column took over an hour to pass the King, who took the salute mounted on his horse Delhi.

Soon afterwards, the 29th Division left England for war service abroad: with the Royal Naval Division, the Australian and New Zealand Army Corps and the French Corps expéditionnaire d'Orient, it formed the Mediterranean Expeditionary Force that landed on the Gallipoli peninsula in April 1915.

The British forces withdrew in January 1916 and the 29th Division was redeployed to France, serving on the Western Front, including the first day of the Battle of the Somme, and also at the Battle of Arras and the Third Battle of Ypres (Passchendaele), and then was part of the British Army of the Rhine that occupied parts of Germany after the Armistice. By the time it was disbanded in March 1919, the division had suffered some 94,000 casualties.

== Memorial ==
The memorial was designed and constructed by Robert Bridgeman and Sons from Lichfield. It comprises a tapering 12 metres (39 ft) monolith of Portland stone topped by a stone urn with crown and orb, standing on a square pedestal. The north side of the pedestal bears the red triangle insignia of the division, above which is a panel with the inscription:

"HERE / IN THE CENTRE OF ENGLAND / WHERE TELFORD'S COACHING-ROAD / FROM LONDON TO HOLYHEAD / IS CROSSED BY THE ROMAN FOSSE WAY / ON THE 12TH OF MARCH 1915 / HIS MAJESTY KING GEORGE V / REVIEWED HIS TROOPS / OF THE IMMORTAL / XXIX DIVISION / SHORTLY BEFORE THEY EMBARKED / FOR ACTIVE SERVICE / IN GALLIPOLI" and carries on in smaller type "IN MEMORY OF THEIR STAY IN WARWICKSHIRE / 1914-15 AND OF THEIR INCOMPARABLE SERVICES / SINCE THE AVENUE ON THIS ROAD WAS REPLANTED / AND THIS MONUMENT ERECTED BY / INHABITANTS OF THE COUNTY". Inscriptions on the base of the pedestal record the division's order of battle.

It was erected after the war, near the place where the 29th Division was reviewed in 1915. The £646 cost was raised from public subscriptions, and £720 donated by John Montagu Douglas Scott, 7th Duke of Buccleuch who also donated the land for the memorial.

The memorial was unveiled by the Lord Lieutenant of Warwickshire William Craven, 4th Earl of Craven at a ceremony attended by over 7,000 people on 24 May 1921, Empire Day. It was accepted by the Chairman of Warwickshire County Council Lord Algernon Percy and dedicated by the Bishop of Coventry Huyshe Yeatman-Biggs.

The memorial stands in circle of gravel with an avenue of lime trees. The limes were planted in the 1950s and later renewed, and replace the remains of a 6 miles (9.7 km) long avenue of elm trees to either side of the London Road (now the A45) planted in the early 18th century across Dunsmore Heath which had themselves been renewed as part of the memorial project in 1920-21 after many were blown down by a storm in 1912. Two captured field guns were displayed to either side of the memorial, but it is believed that they were removed as scrap metal during the Second World War.

The site is now within a roundabout installed in the mid-1980s at the junction of the A45 and the B4455 (part of the Roman Fosse Way from Exeter to Lincoln). The memorial became a Grade II listed building in 1987, upgraded to Grade II* in March 2015

== See also ==
- Lancashire Fusiliers War Memorial, memorial to a regiment which fought as part of the 29th Division
- Grade II* listed buildings in Rugby (borough)
- Grade II* listed war memorials in England
