= Newbold Quarry Park =

Nature reserve in Warwickshire, England

Coordinates: 52°23′18″N 1°16′28″W

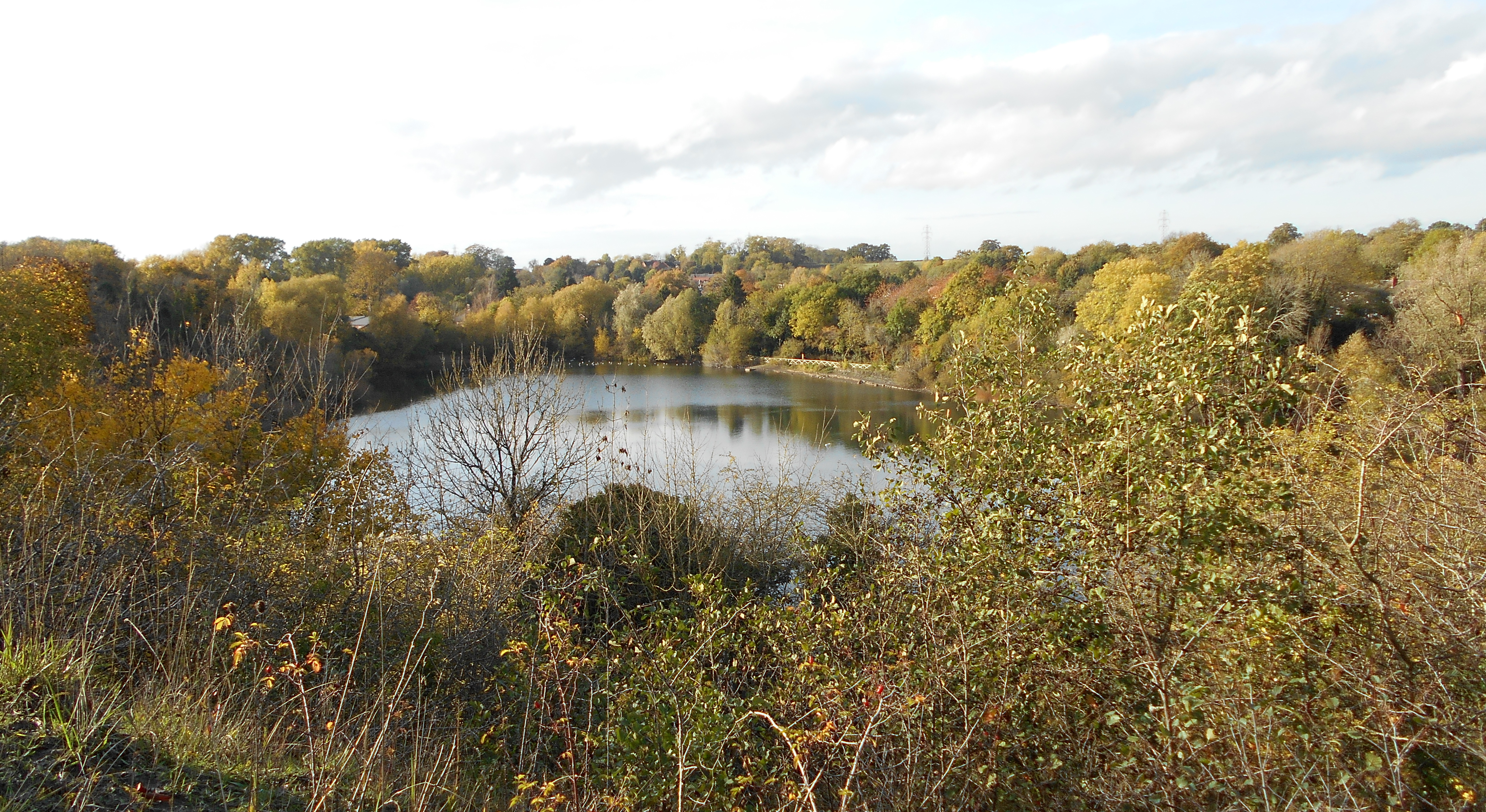
View over the former quarry

Newbold Quarry Park is a nature reserve in Newbold-on-Avon, around 1½ miles north-west of Rugby town centre, Warwickshire, England. It consists of a former water-filled quarry surrounded by woodlands and covers an area of 10.50 hectares (25.9 acres). It is managed by the Warwickshire Wildlife Trust on behalf of Rugby Borough Council.

== History ==
The site was formerly used to quarry for Blue Lias limestone, in connection with the local cement industry. Quarrying at the site was initiated in 1877 by the Newbold Lime & Cement Co. Ltd, and several cement kilns operated alongside the quarry. Production ended in 1910, started again briefly in 1920, and was abandoned permanently by 1923 after the quarry flooded. The plant was dismantled in 1927.

The derelict quarry was the scene of a tragedy in October 1990 when two local boys aged ten and six drowned after falling into the water, following this, the site was taken over by Rugby Borough Council in 1991 and turned into a nature reserve with improved access, fencing and warning signs.

Though 6 weeks after 17-year-old Toby Burwell's disappearance on 20 February 2023, his body was found in the water on 6 April.

== Wildlife ==
Newbold Quarry Park attracts many water birds, such as great crested grebes, swans, moorhens and a variety of ducks. The clean, limey water also support native crayfish, which resemble small lobsters. Other species have also been found living in the water including smooth newts, frog tadpoles, pike and perch fish species, and also invertebrates living in the soft quarry walls. Bat boxes have also been provided. Other water mammals such as water rats can be seen swimming in the water.

== Depth ==
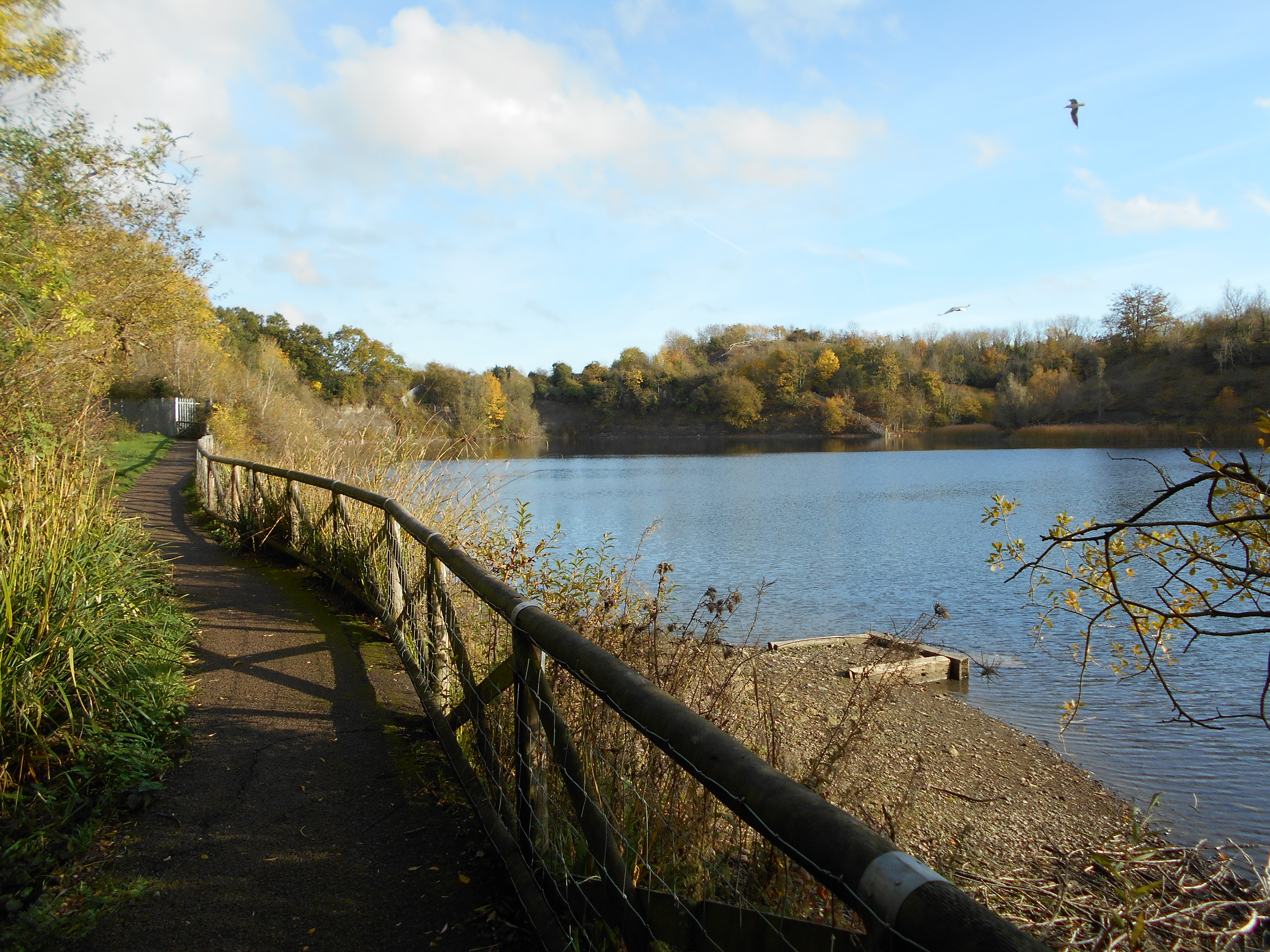
Path around the former quarry

The quarry is up to 15 metres (49 ft) deep in places. Skilled Divers exploring it in 2018 discovered, among other dangerous hazards, the remains of two cars dating from the 1970s and 80s, a motorbike, vertical metal beams and an old pram frame.

A public space protection order prohibits swimming due to safety concerns. Fishing is also restricted.

== See also ==
- Swift Valley Nature Reserve - another nature reserve nearby
