= Lawrence Sheriff =

Elizabethan merchant and benefactor

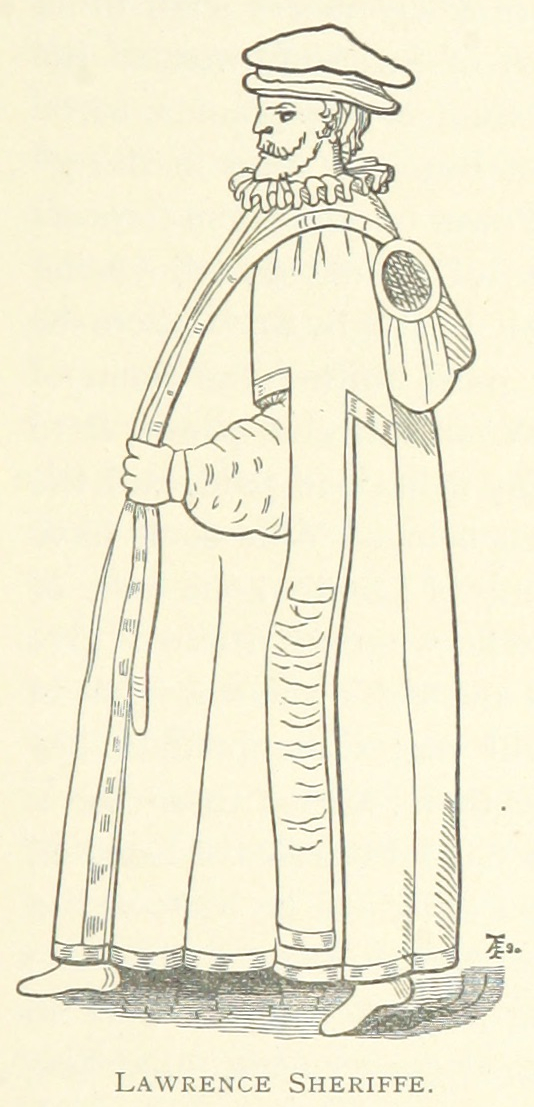
- Drawing depicting Lawrence Sheriff
- Born: c. 1515–1516; Rugby, Warwickshire, England
- Died: September, 1567; London
- Burial place: Christ Church Greyfriars
- Occupation: Grocer
- Known for: Grocer to Elizabeth I, founder of Rugby School
- Spouse: Elizabeth Sheriff

Lawrence Sheriff (or Sheriffe) (c. 1515 or 1516 – September 1567) was a Tudor merchant and benefactor, who was notable for being grocer to Queen Elizabeth I, and for creating Rugby School through an endowment in his will.

Not much is known about Lawrence Sheriff's early life, but it is thought that he was born either in a (now long-vanished) house opposite St Andrew's Church in Rugby, Warwickshire, or in an extant house in the nearby village of Brownsover. His father was a yeoman farmer, and probably one of the most important people in Rugby at the time. His date of birth is not known with certainty, but is believed to have been either 1515 or 1516. Sheriff likely received a basic education from the monks of Pipewell Abbey, who had a small grange in Rugby at the time. He was apprenticed by his father to a London grocer named William Walcott, at which point he went to London. His seven-year apprenticeship ended in 1541, after which he became a London grocer during the reign of King Henry VIII. In 1554 he was elected to the London livery company the 'Worshipful Company of Grocers'.

Sheriff became a highly successful grocer to many of the rich and powerful of the day including Princess (later Queen from 1558) Elizabeth. Sheriff provided "spices and necessaries" to Princess Elizabeth when she was living in exile at Hatfield House. Sheriff remained unwaveringly loyal to her during this difficult period, and in 1559 following her accession he was granted a coat of arms produced by Herald's College with the Queen's approval, the main feature of which is a griffin, the traditional guardian of treasures. In the New Year's Gift list for 1562 there is a record of an exchange of gifts between Sheriff and the Queen; he gave her "a sugar loaf, a box of ginger, a box of nutmegs and a pound of cinnamon", while she in return gave him "one gilt salt with a cover (weighing 7 oz.)".

He took up residence in a large house called the King's Grocer's House on Newgate Street in the City of London. Throughout his life he bought extensive property in the areas of Rugby, Brownsover and London, including the estate of Conduit Close in Middlesex.

He became a wealthy merchant, and married a woman called Elizabeth but was not known to have had any children. In 1566 he was elected as the Vice-Warden of the Grocers’ Company, but the following year he became ill and died in September 1567. In his last few months he drew up a will which stipulated that his fortune should be used to found almshouses and a school "to serve chiefly for the children of Rugby and Brownsover... and next for such as be of other places hereunto adjoyneing." Shortly before his death, Sheriff added a codicil to his will reducing the amount of money he left to the school, possibly due to a family financial problem, and instead leaving to it his eight-acre Conduit Close estate. At the time, this seemed like a poor exchange, as the estate consisted of undeveloped farmland on the edge of London. However, in time this endowment made Rugby School a wealthy institution due to the subsequent development of the area and rise in land values. The area of the estate includes much of what is now Great Ormond Street, Lamb's Conduit Street and Rugby Street in the London district of Bloomsbury. This endowment was not fully realized, however, for some time, due to a challenge over the provisions of the will from the Howkins family, to whom Sheriff was related through his sister, Bridget.

He requested to be buried at parish church of St Andrew's Church in Rugby, where his parents were buried, but this request was not carried out, and instead he was buried at Christ Church Greyfriars in Newgate in London. However no trace remains: the church and all its monuments were destroyed in the Great Fire of London in 1666. He is remembered today by the Lawrence Sheriff School, the Lawrence Sheriff Almshouses, and Lawrence Sheriff Street in Rugby. Both Rugby School and the Lawrence Sheriff School use versions of the coat of arms granted to Lawrence Sheriff in 1559.
