= Swift Valley Nature Reserve =

Nature reserve in Rugby, Warwickshire, England

Coordinates: 52°23′39″N 1°15′30″W

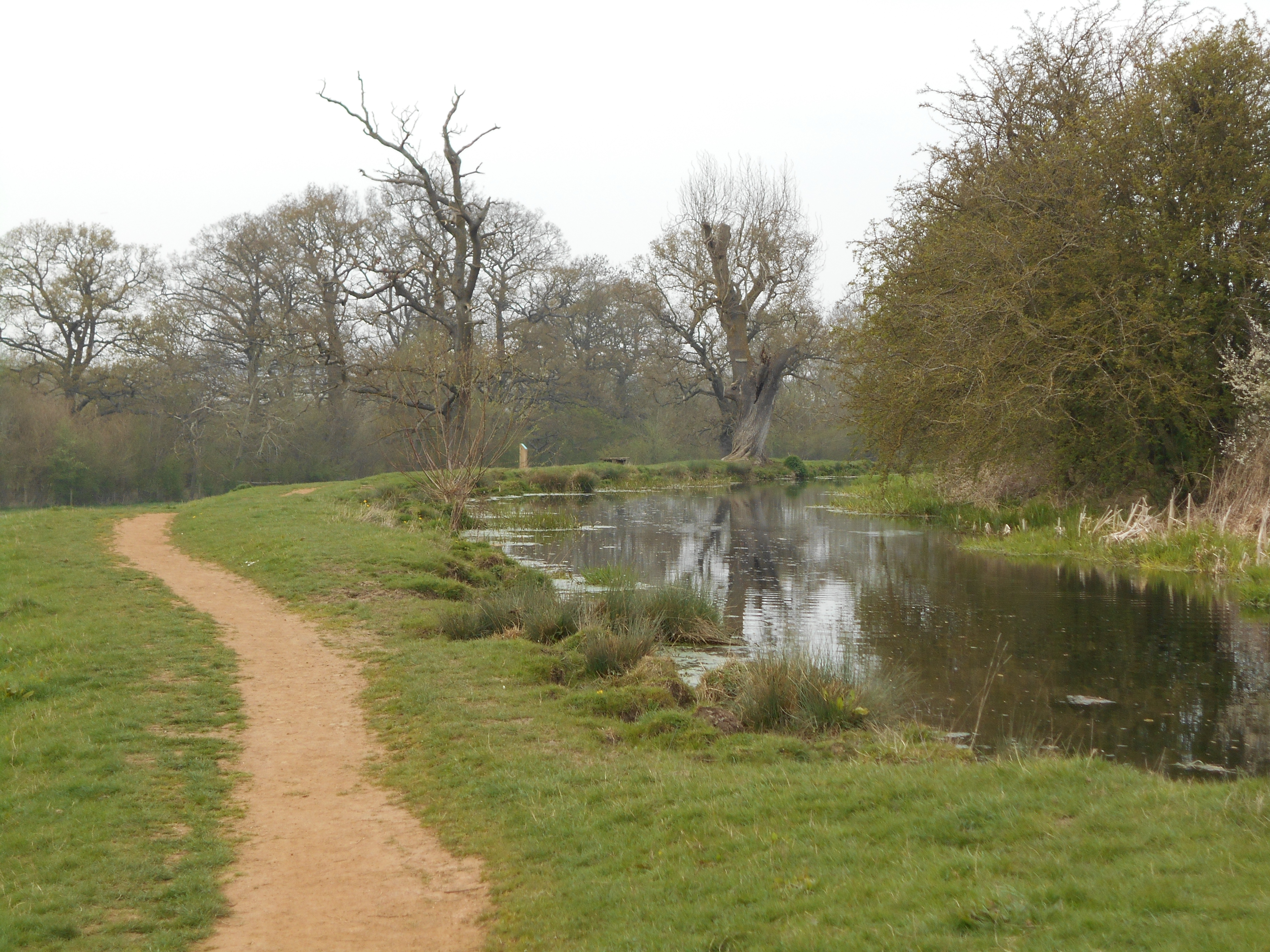
Old arm of the Oxford Canal running through the nature reserve

The Swift Valley Nature Reserve is a nature reserve at the Brownsover area of Rugby, Warwickshire on the northern outskirts of the town. It covers an area of 24 hectares (59 acres) and is named after the River Swift (a tributary of the River Avon) which it is adjacent to.

== History ==
The reserve was created in 2003 by Rugby Borough Council in partnership with the Warwickshire Wildlife Trust, on land acquired as part of a planning agreement with a nearby commercial development. It was opened by David Bellamy in August 2003.

== Features ==
The reserve includes an area of grassland with ancient ridge and furrow, hedgerows, woodland and wetland adjacent to River Swift and a disused canal. A number of paths run around it to allow access.

=== Old canal arm ===
A centrepiece of the reserve is a disused arm of the Oxford Canal known as the 'Brownsover Arm'; this was part of the original route of the canal built in the late 18th century. In the 1830s the canal was straightened out and this section of the old route was abandoned. It is no longer navigable, but remains filled with water as it is used to feed water to the Oxford Canal from the River Swift.

== Wildlife ==
The wetland habitats of the reserve contain many species of dragonfly and damselfly. Nationally rare soldier and longhorn beetles have been recorded. Many species of butterflies are also plentiful in the grassland.

Birds on the reserve include kestrel, hobby and sparrowhawks, which can regularly be seen hunting. The wetland area sees a number of species of swans and ducks. Snipe and various gulls visit in the winter.

== See also ==
- Newbold Quarry Park - another nature reserve nearby
