= St Marie's Church, Rugby =

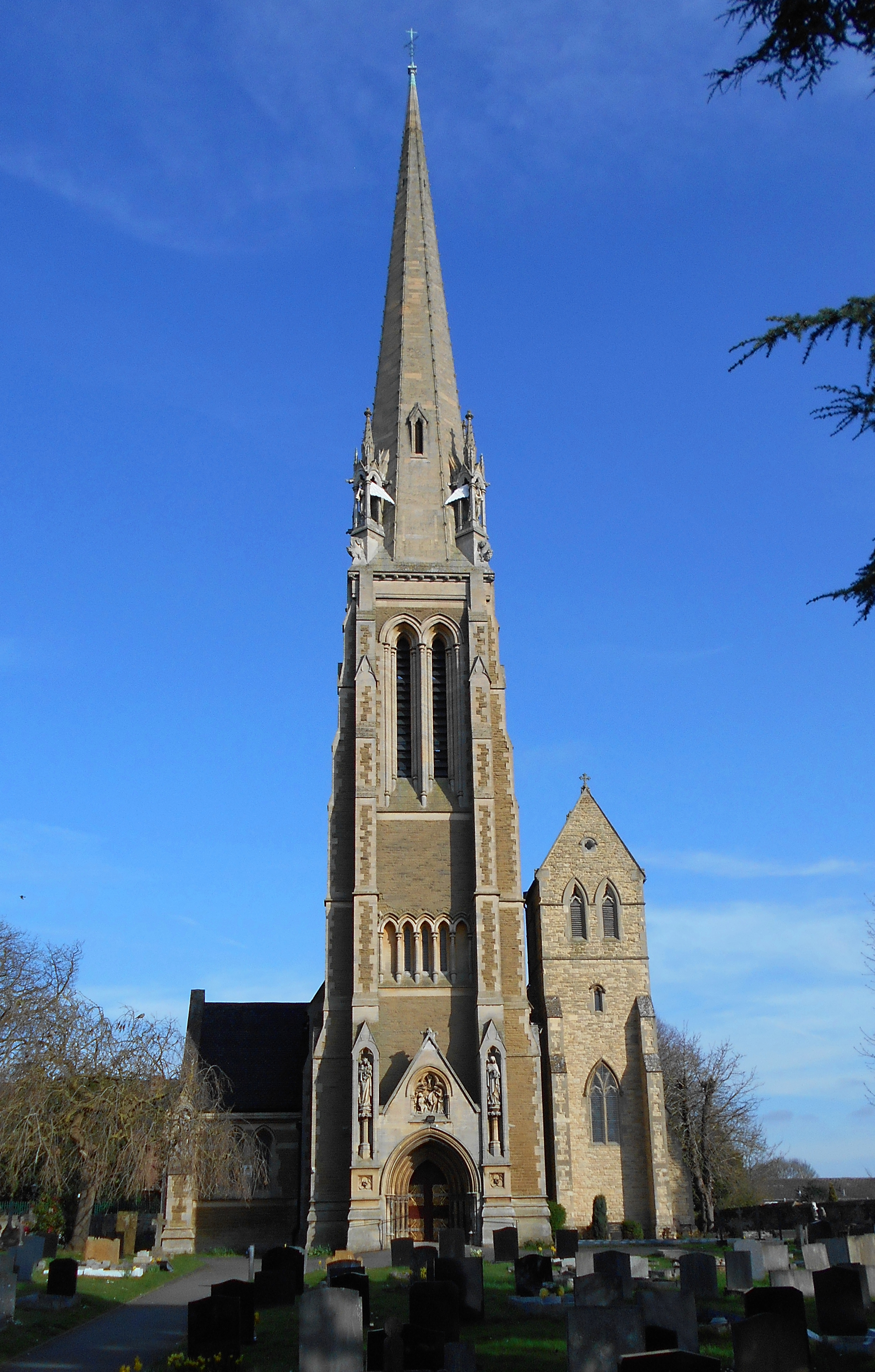
- St Marie's church
- St Marie's Church, Rugby
- 52.366485°N 1.263718°W
- OS grid reference: SP 50236 74525
- Location: Dunchurch Road, Rugby, Warwickshire
- Country: England
- Denomination: Roman Catholic
- Website: www.stmaries.co.uk

History
- Status: Active

Architecture
- Architect(s): Augustus Pugin; E. W. Pugin; Bernard Whelan
- Architectural type: Gothic revival
- Years built: 1847-1872

Administration
- Diocese: Roman Catholic Archdiocese of Birmingham
- Deanery: Banbury and Warwick Deanery

Listed Building – Grade II*
- Official name: Roman Catholic Church of St Marie
- Designated: 11 October 1949
- Reference no.: 1365006

St Marie's Church is the main Roman Catholic church in Rugby, Warwickshire, England, located to the south of the town centre on Dunchurch Road, one of the main roads into the town. It is one of the town's most well-known landmarks as it is quite dominant on the skyline.

== History ==
The church came about because Captain Washington Hibbert of Bilton Grange, married Julia Tichborne, a Catholic woman in 1839. As there was no provision for Catholics in Rugby, Hibbert bought a plot of land off Dunchurch Road and commissioned Augustus Pugin to design a church. It was first opened in 1847, designed in the Gothic revival style. It was enlarged in 1864 by Pugin's son Edward Welby Pugin, and in 1872 the current tall and slender spire was added, designed by Bernard Whelan, which is nearly 200 feet (61 metres) tall. The church has been Grade II* listed since 1949.

== Today ==
The church is part of the Banbury and Warwick Deanery in the Roman Catholic Archdiocese of Birmingham.
