= Brownsover =

Area of Rugby, Warwickshire, England

Coordinates: 52.391792°N 1.254702°W

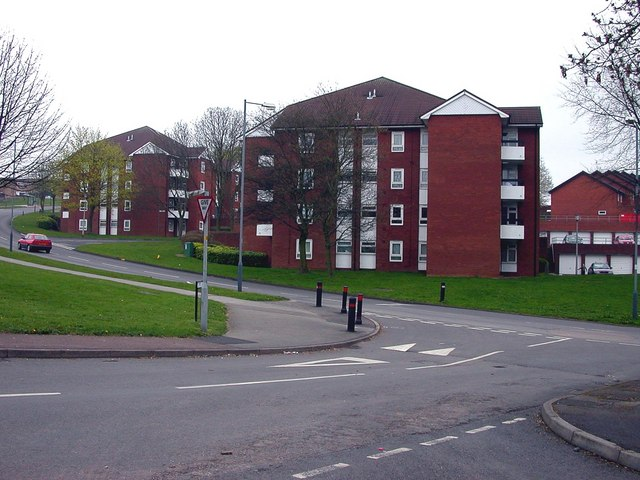

- Location within Warwickshire
- OS grid reference: SP515775
- District: Rugby
- Shire county: Warwickshire
- Region: West Midlands
- Country: England
- Sovereign state: United Kingdom
- Post town: RUGBY
- Postcode district: CV21
- Dialling code: 01788
- Police: Warwickshire
- Fire: Warwickshire
- Ambulance: West Midlands
- UK Parliament: Rugby

Brownsover is a residential and commercial area of Rugby, Warwickshire in England, about 1 1/2 miles north of the town centre. The area is named after the original hamlet of Brownsover. Since 1960, the area has been subsumed by the expansion of Rugby, with the construction of a number of housing estates, industrial estates and retail parks.

== 'Old' Brownsover ==
The original hamlet of Brownsover still exists, to the west of A426 "Leicester Road". It was originally a hamlet within the parish of Clifton-upon-Dunsmore, and was mentioned in the Domesday Book as "Gaura". In 1932 it was incorporated into the borough of Rugby. In 1931 the parish had a population of 391.

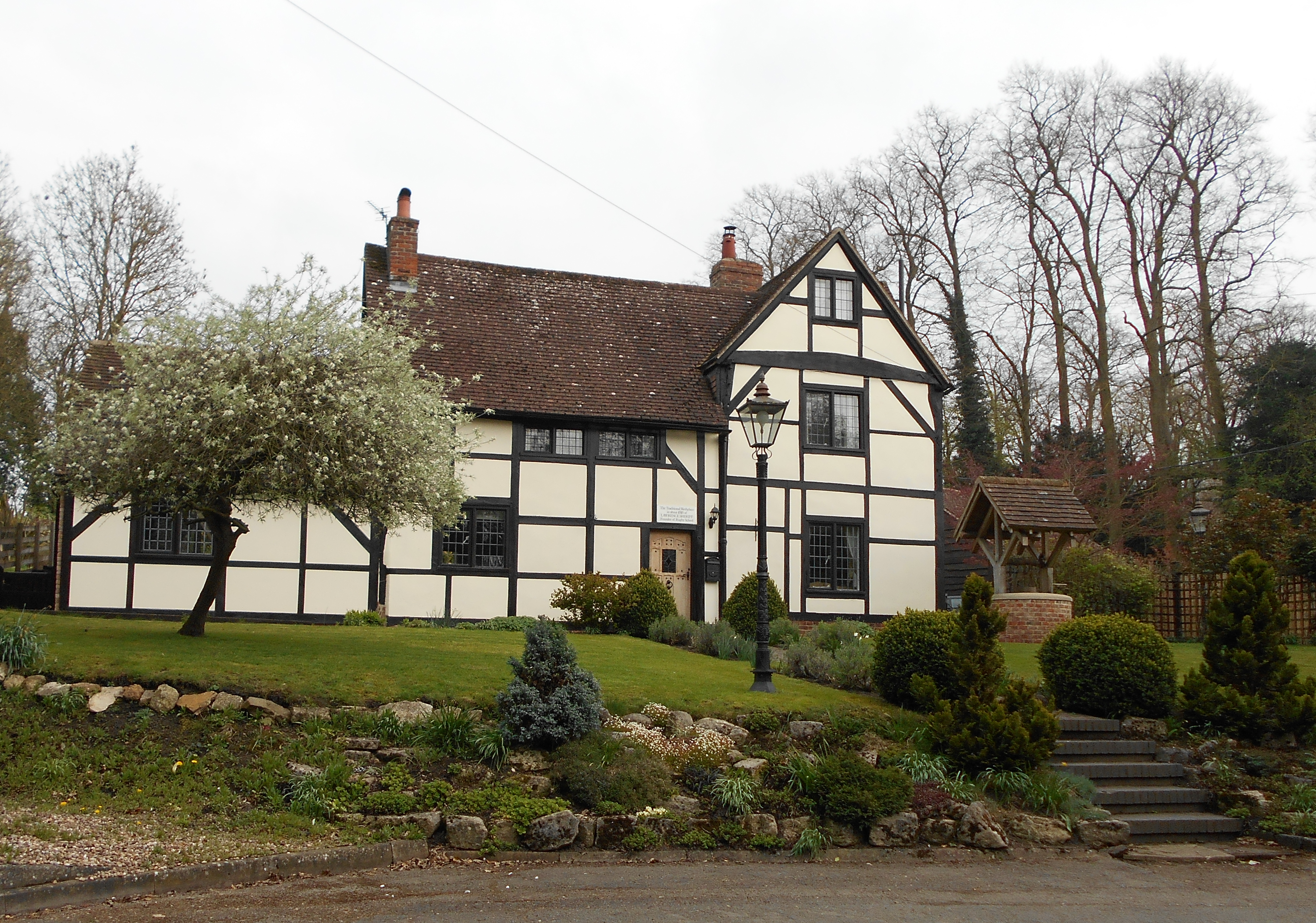
The house in Brownsover, traditionally believed to be the birthplace of Lawrence Sheriff.

Brownsover Hall is situated here, this country house was rebuilt in the Victorian era by the Ward-Boughton-Leigh family who were the principal landowners in the area. The hall has now become a large hotel and conference centre. Brownsover Hall is also where Frank Whittle developed the jet engine in the 1930s.

The hamlet also contains an old house which is one place where Lawrence Sheriff (c1515-1567), the founder of Rugby School, may have been born, although it is more likely he was born in Rugby. Sheriff certainly had links to Brownsover, as he purchased the rectory and farm of Brownsover in 1562.

The old (C of E) parish church of St. Michael & All Angels was founded in the 12th century as a chapel of ease, and was almost entirely rebuilt by Sir George Gilbert Scott in 1877 for Allesley Boughton-Leigh. The church has an interesting collection of English and foreign carved woodwork, including a splendid organ case, made in 1660 for St John's College, Cambridge. There is one armorial monumental inscription in the floor of the church, the grave of John Howkins (1579-1678), a wealthy lawyer who owned the estate of Pinchbank in South Mimms, Middlesex. He was the great-nephew of Lawrence Sheriff. The church is now closed to regular use and has been replaced by a modern place of worship - Christchurch in Helvellyn Way, new Brownsover. Brownsover is mentioned in Tom Brown's Schooldays.

== 'New' Brownsover ==
The new part of Brownsover, to the east of Leicester Road, contains modern housing estates built mostly during the 1960s and 70s. More recently, several building programmes have been completed, specifically in the areas referred to as 'Strawberry Fields' and 'Rectory Gardens', in the 1990s, with two other projects nearing completion. These two relatively new developments are considered more to the standards of the areas such as Hillmorton and are very near to Clifton-upon-Dunsmore. There are three local schools: Boughton Leigh Infants and Boughton Leigh Junior, which share a campus, and there is also the newer Brownsover Community School. The local church, Christchurch in Helvellyn Way, is an ecumenical project involving Anglicans, Methodists and Baptists. Brownsover has a number of green spaces as well as the canal.

== Education ==
Primary education is provided by Boughton Leigh Junior School and Boughton Leigh Infant school, and Brownsover Community Infants School.

== Oxford Canal and nature reserve ==
The Oxford Canal runs through the Brownsover area. The original canal was built in the late 18th century, and was straightened out in the 1820s. Part of the original abandoned route of the canal was retained to act as a water feeder from the River Swift; this stretch known as the 'Brownsover Arm' is no longer navigable, but is still water filled. The land around the old canal arm became the Swift Valley Nature Reserve in 2003.
