= St Andrew's Church, Rugby =

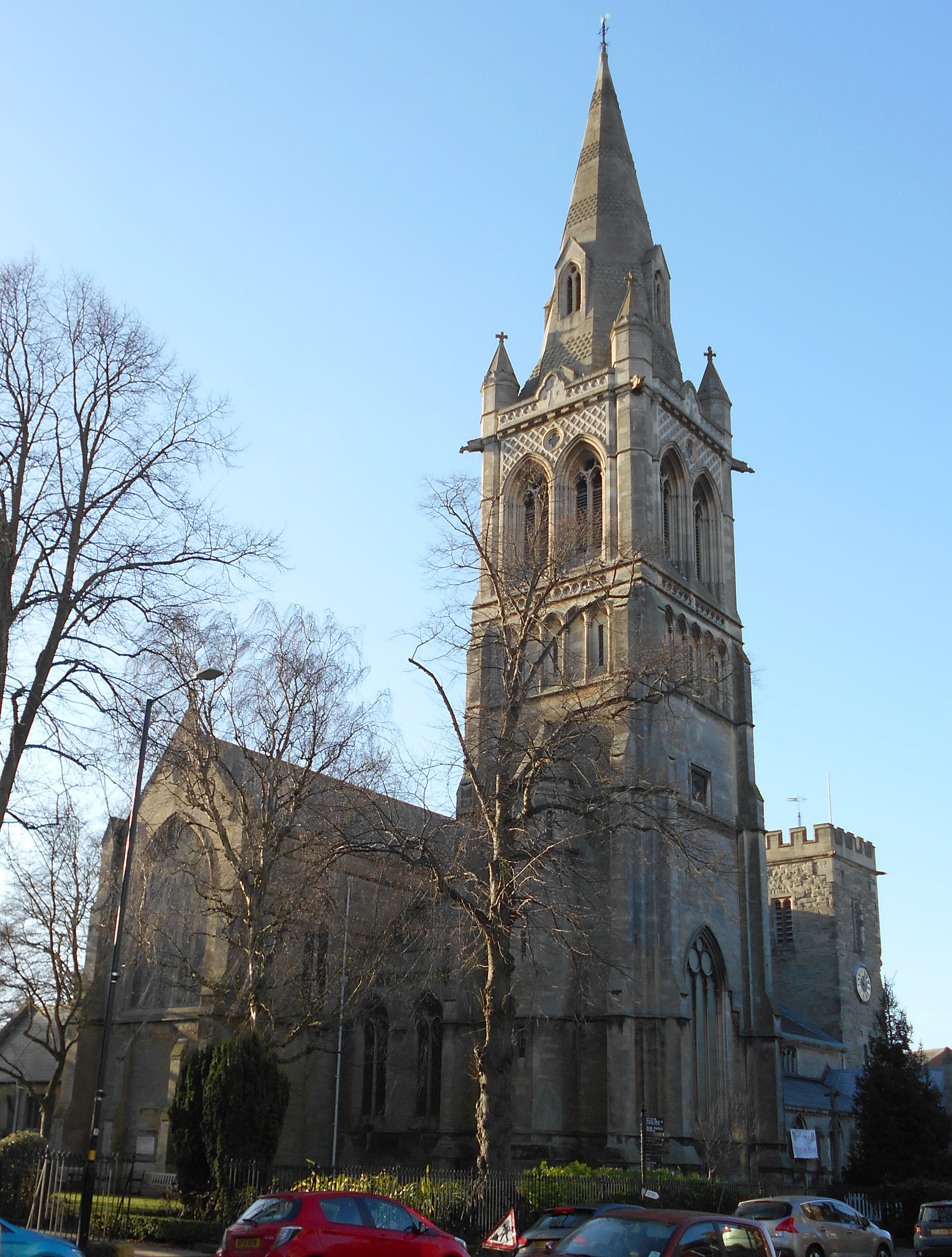
- St Andrew's Church seen from the north
- St Andrew's Church, Rugby
- 52.3726°N 1.2614°W
- OS grid reference: SP 50385 75208
- Location: Church Street, Rugby, Warwickshire, CV21 3PT
- Country: England
- Denomination: Church of England
- Churchmanship: Liberal Catholic
- Website: standrewrugby.org.uk

History
- Status: Active

Architecture
- Functional status: Parish church
- Architect: William Butterfield
- Architectural type: Gothic
- Years built: 14th century original but major rebuilding in 19th century

Administration
- Province: Province of Canterbury
- Diocese: Diocese of Coventry
- Archdeaconry: Archdeaconry of Coventry
- Deanery: Rugby
- Parish: Rugby St Andrew

Clergy
- Rector: Rev Canon Edmund Newey

Listed Building – Grade II*
- Official name: Church of Saint Andrew
- Designated: 11 October 1949
- Reference no.: 1183695

The Church of St Andrew is a Church of England parish church and civic church in the centre of Rugby, in Warwickshire, England. It is a grade II* listed building. It is unique in having two peals of bells hung in separate towers and is part of the Major Churches Network. The church has medieval origins, but was greatly enlarged during the Victorian era.

== History ==
=== Medieval ===
The first record of a church at the site was from 1140, originally as a chapel of ease of the mother church at nearby Clifton-upon-Dunsmore, until Rugby became a parish in 1221, and the chapel was upgraded to a parish church. Nothing is thought to remain of the original church, as it is believed to have been sited some metres away from the later building. It was rebuilt on the present site in either the 13th or 14th century. The oldest surviving parts of the present church are the North aisle and the 72 ft (22 m) high West tower, which is unusual in that its appearance and construction bears strong resemblance to that of a castle tower, meaning it was likely built to serve a defensive as well as religious role. According to a local legend, the tower was built from stones from a castle at Rugby, which had been demolished on the orders of Henry II, who forbade private fortifications without royal approval, however there was no prohibition against fortified churches, and so the tower may have been constructed, nominally as an addition to the church, but in reality as a way to provide a place of defence, while still conforming to the statute. The West tower is usually dated to the 14th century, but was possibly built during the reign of Henry III (1216–1272), and is Rugby's oldest building. The church has other artefacts of medieval Rugby including the 13th-century parish chest, and a medieval font.

=== 19th century expansion ===
In order to cater for the growing population of the town, the church was enlarged several times in 1797, 1814, and then again in 1830, becoming ever larger. This involved demolition of much of the older church and resulted in the loss of some 14th century wall paintings.

In the late 19th century, due to the dilapidation of the building, St Andrew's was extensively rebuilt on a much larger footprint to the designs of William Butterfield, retaining only the West tower and North nave arcade from the medieval church. The main works were carried out between 1877 and 1879, with further additions from 1895 to 1896, by Ewan Christian to Butterfield's original designs, including a new East tower, added in 1895 which has a spire 182 ft (55 m) high.

Very unusually, both of the church towers have ringable bells, the main peal of eight bells (all cast in 1896 by Mears & Stainbank, London) being located in the East tower, and the old peal of five bells (all cast in 1711 by Joseph Smith of Edgbaston) located in the West tower.

On 11 October 1949, the church was designated a grade II* listed building.

== Architecture ==
Externally the church is built from cream Bath stone under a grey slate roof. Internally, and in true Butterfield style, the supporting pillars are in bands of cream Bath stone and red Alton stone and there is much use of polychromatic tiles to the floor and walls in red, cream, grey and black. Overall the interior scheme is considered by many to be the pinnacle of Butterfied's achievement, his masterpiece, showing great finesse and sophistication. It has a painted ceiling reaching up sixty feet. There is stained glass, notably by Clayton and Bell, especially the East window and West window by the same company. There are two lancet windows partially obscured by the organ and a Rose Window completely hidden behind the organ.

Near the organ and again partially obscured by it, is a mosaic by the renowned Italian company of Antonio Salviati of Murano, Venice, probably in collaboration with Clayton and Bell.

During the period from 1909 to 1936 extensive works by Alec Miller,a highly regarded sculptor and leading member of the Campden Guild of Handicrafts, were commissioned. These include a statue of the Madonna and Child in the Lady Chapel, the reredos behind the high altar, painted by Miller on wood board, and a superb set of wrought iron screens in front of the chancel and Lady Chapel and a set of three screens flanking the chancel and Lady Chapel. Together they represent one of the largest ensembles of Miller's work.

The design of the church's East tower and spire bears resemblance to some of Butterfield's other works such as Adelaide Cathedral.

== Present day ==
St Andrew's stands in the liberal catholic tradition of the Church of England.

== Notable clergy ==
- Robin Gill, theologian, served his curacy here from 1968 to 1971
- Geoffrey Studdert Kennedy, known as "Woodbine Willie", served his curacy here before the First World War.

== Gallery ==
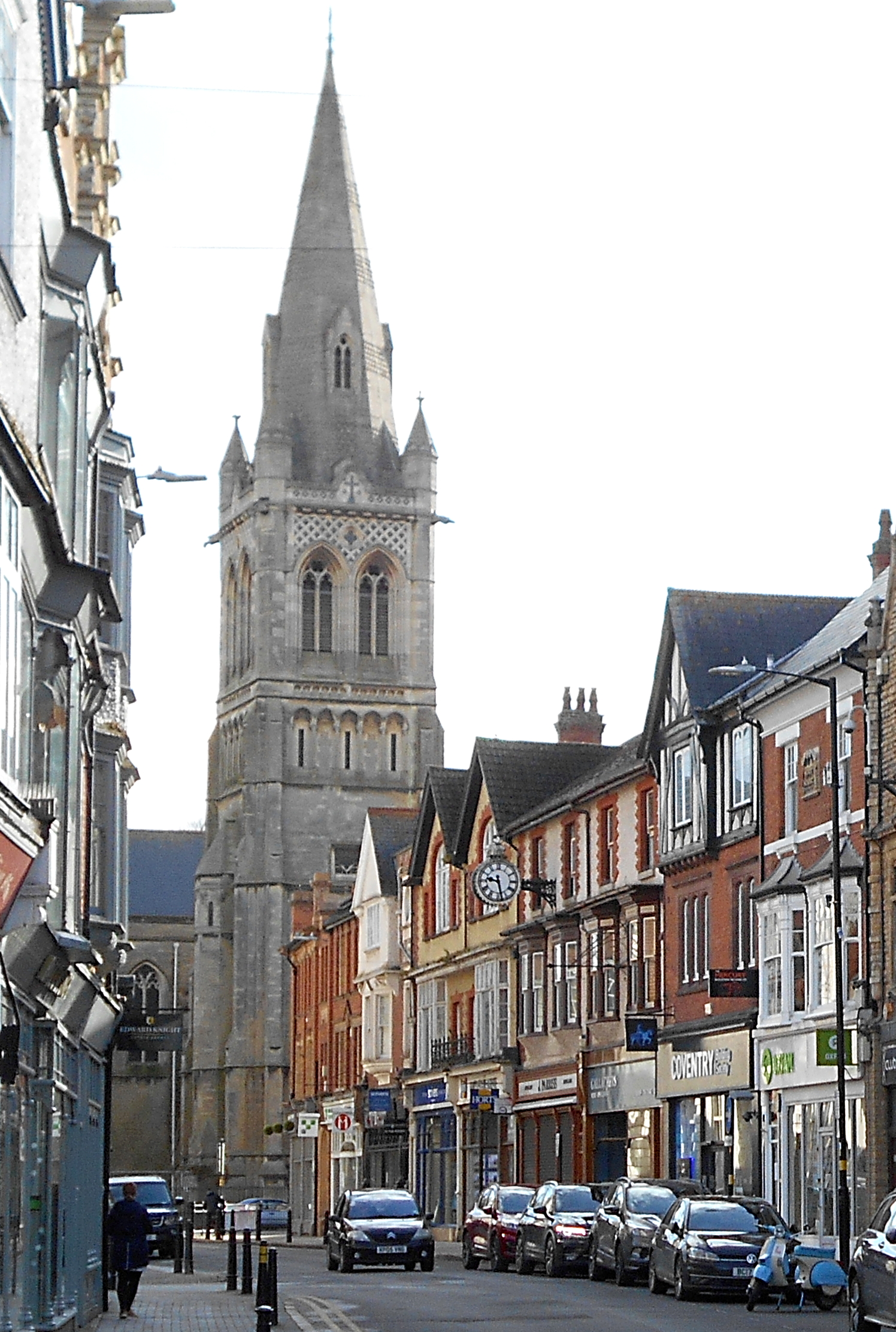
The east tower spire seen from Regent Street

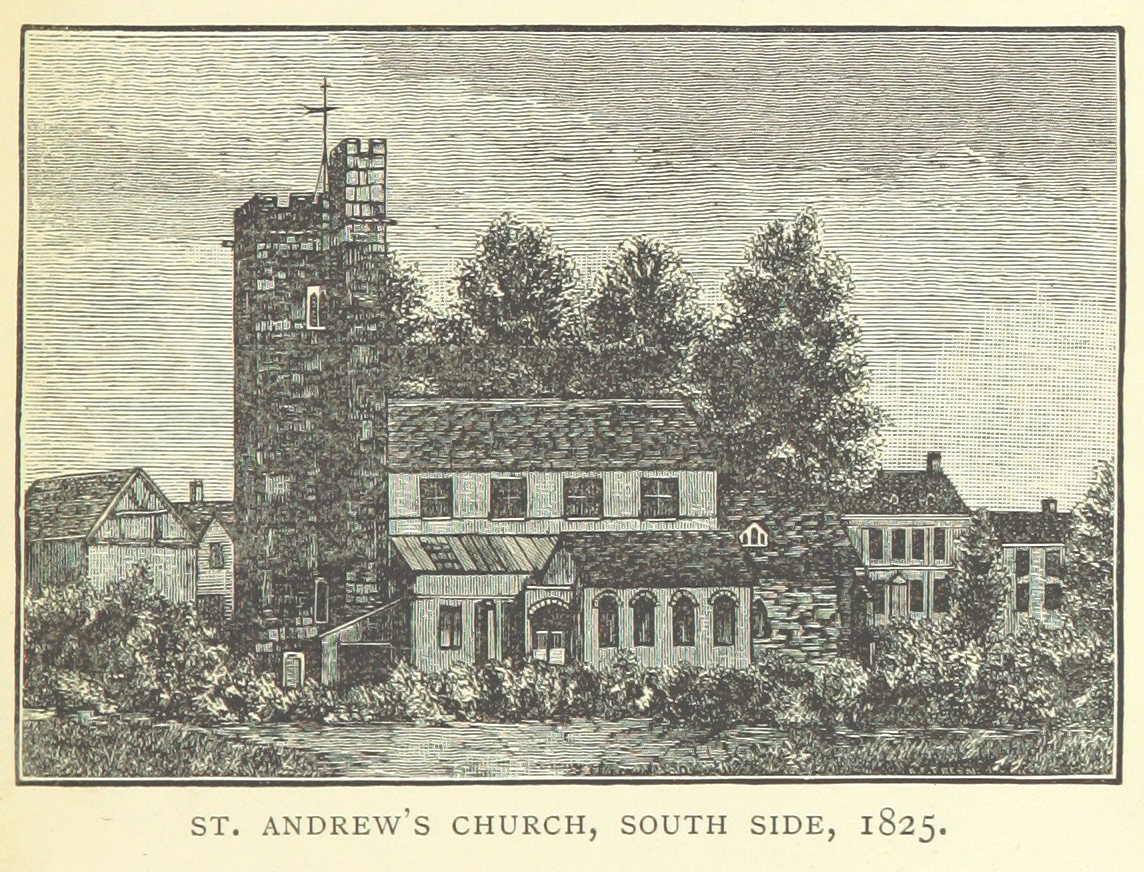
Drawing of the church from 1825, prior to its expansion and addition of the second tower

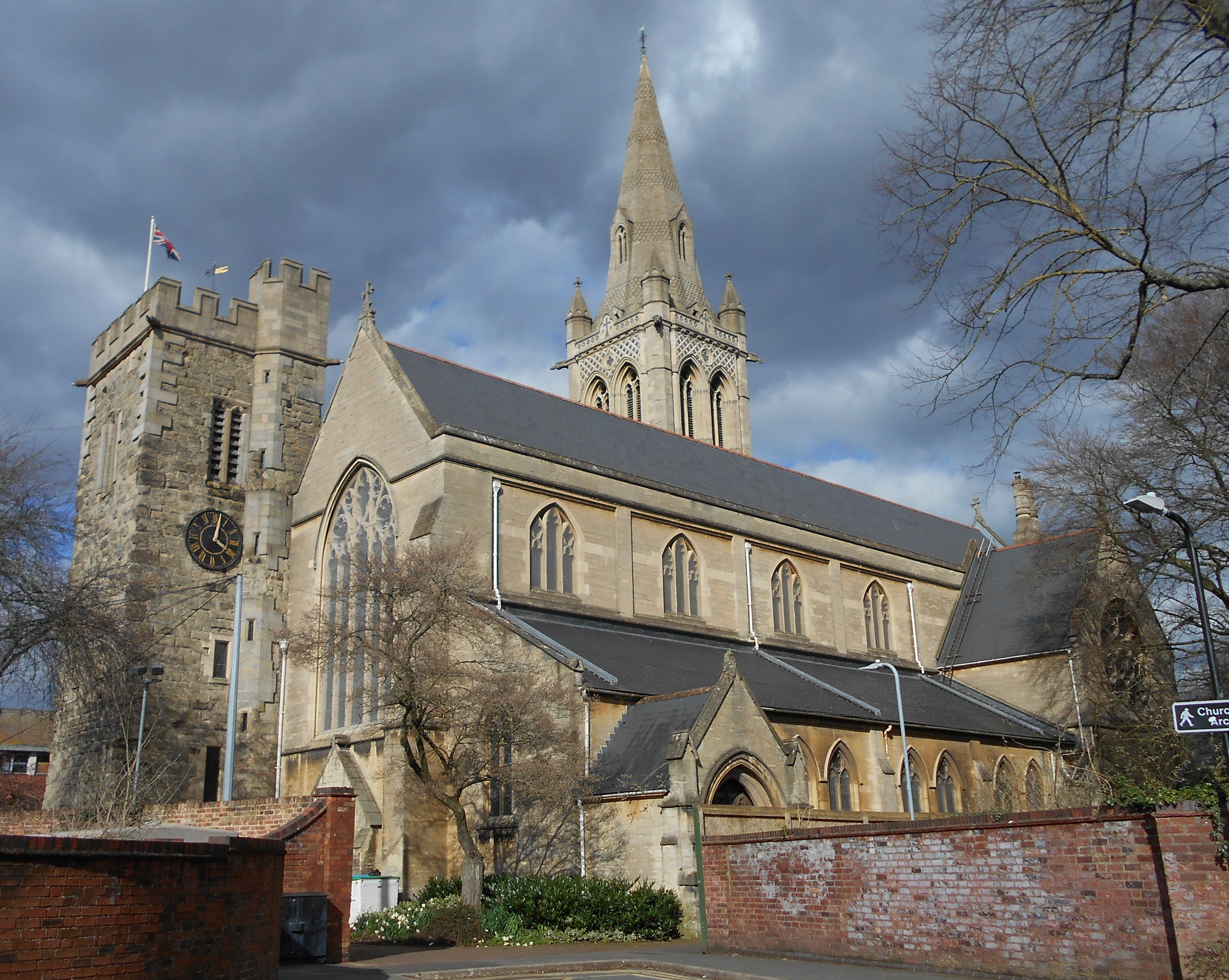
The church seen from the south

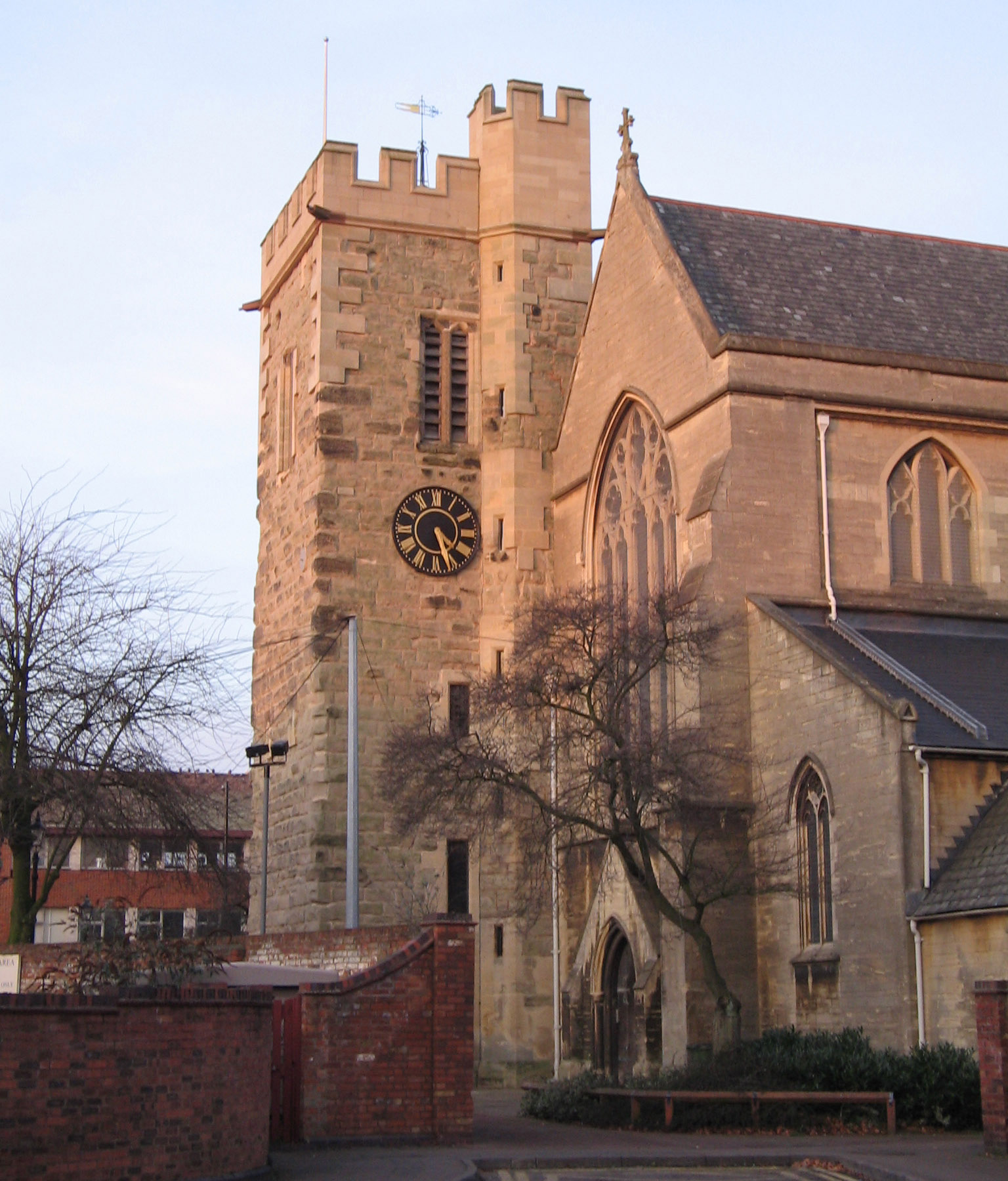
Close up of the Medieval west tower

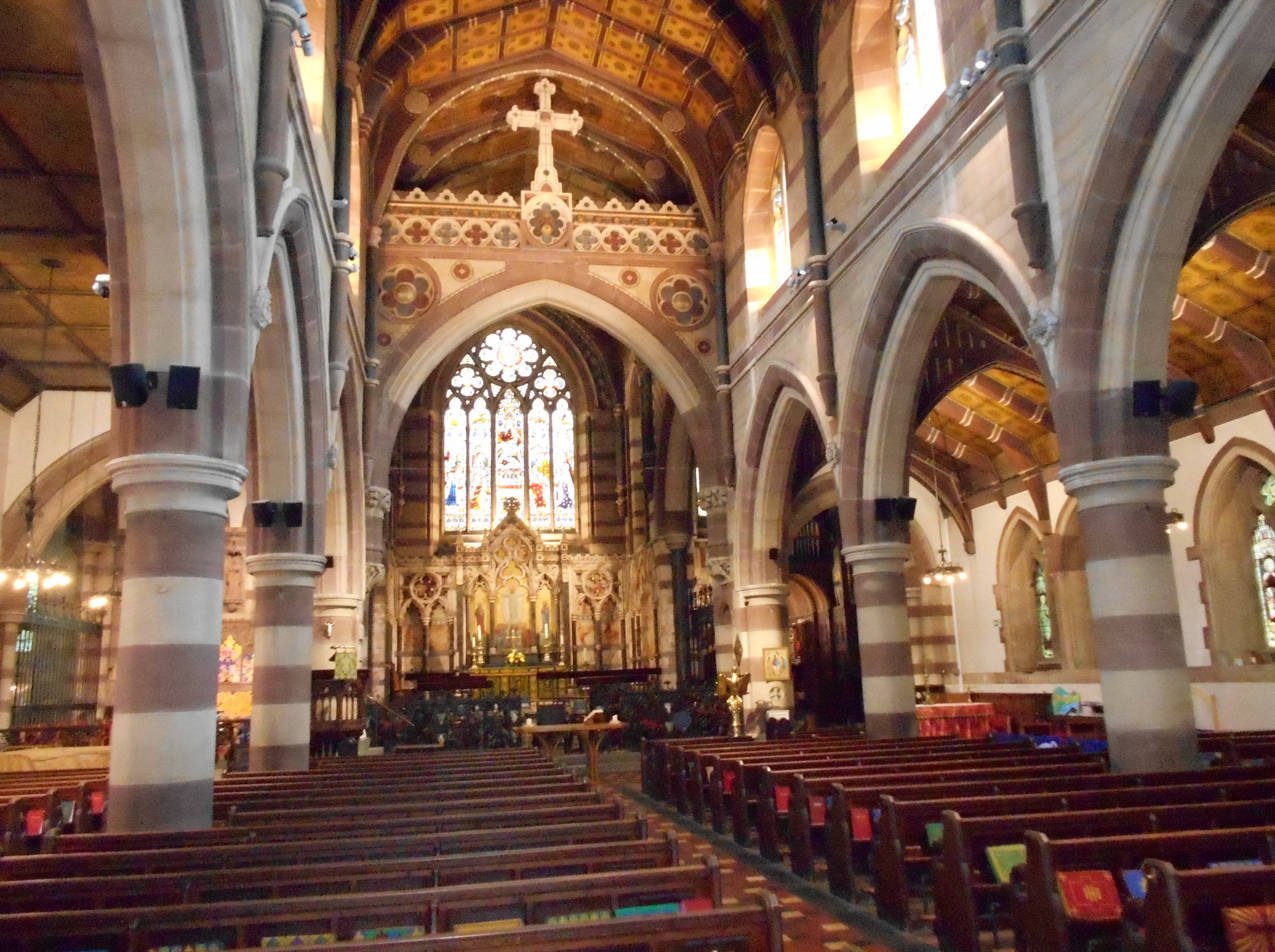
Interior
