= Brownsover Hall =

Country house in Warwickshire, England

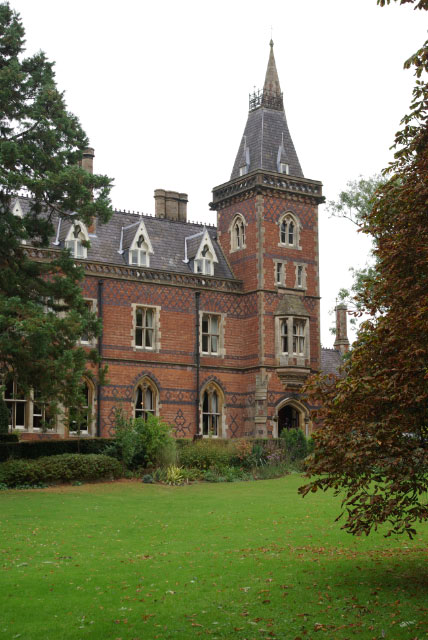
- Interactive map of Brownsover Hall
- 52.3935°N 1.2559°W
- Location: Leicester Road, Brownsover, Rugby, Warwickshire, England

Listed Building – Grade II*
- Official name: Brownsover Hall
- Designated: 3 September 1976
- Reference no.: 1365029

Listed Building – Grade II
- Official name: Stable Block at Brownsover Hall
- Designated: 12 March 1986
- Reference no.: 1034996

Listed Building – Grade II
- Official name: Coach House at Brownsover Hall
- Designated: 12 March 1986
- Reference no.: 1034997

Listed Building – Grade II
- Official name: Coachman's Cottage at Brownsover Hall
- Designated: 12 March 1986
- Reference no.: 1249920

Brownsover Hall is a 19th-century mansion house in the old village of Brownsover, Rugby, Warwickshire which has been converted for use as a hotel. It is a Grade II* listed building.

== Early history (1471–1850) ==
The manor of Brownsover was owned from 1471 by the Boughton family who were created Boughton Baronets in 1642. In 1780 Sir Theodosius Boughton was allegedly murdered by his brother-in-law and the estate passed to his sister Theodosia, and thence to Sir Egerton Leigh, Bt, of the Leigh of West Hall family. Leigh's daughter and heiress, also Theodosia, married John Ward, who changed his name by Royal Licence to Ward-Boughton-Leigh.

== Nineteenth century ==
In the mid 19th century the old manor house was replaced with the present mansion, designed in a Victorian Gothic style by architect Sir George Gilbert Scott. William Holland designed a stained glass window and carved tables as frames for Italian marble slabs. He is well known for establishing a Stained Glass and Decorative works at St. John's, Warwick. Other contributors to the new manor were Marshall and Snelgrove of London, and Eld and Chamberlain, of Midland House, Birmingham relating to the carpets and furnishings that were chosen for the house.

The Hall was the home of the Ward-Boughton-Leighs until the death of Ada Emily on 13 October 1952.

== Twentieth century ==
Several rooms at Brownsover Hall were used by Power Jets Ltd staff under Sir Frank Whittle for jet engine design work. Its location was ideal for privacy, its proximity to the B.T.H. works and easy movement to Power Jets works at Lutterworth.

The English Electric Company used the building from 1949 until the late 1960s where they housed the headquarters of their Diesel Division. It was in the 1970s when the Hall was converted into a hotel.

Brownsover Hall is now a hotel including 48 bedrooms, bar, restaurant and tea room. The hotel is set within 11 acres of landscaped grounds, with views over the Swift Valley nature reserve.

The hotel is a licensed property for civil ceremony weddings and hosts many special events throughout the year.
