= Dunchurch railway station =

Former railway station in England

Dunchurch
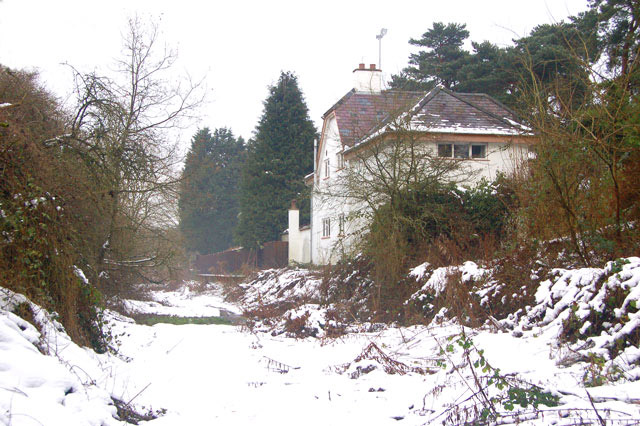
- The station building at Dunchurch in 2010

General information
- Location: Dunchurch, Rugby; England
- Coordinates: 52.343386°N 1.329172°W
- Grid reference: SP456718
- Platforms: 2

Other information
- Status: Disused

History
- Pre-grouping: London and North Western Railway
- Post-grouping: London, Midland and Scottish Railway; London Midland Region of British Railways

Key dates
- 2 October 1871: Opened
- 15 June 1959: Closed to passenger traffic
- 2 November 1964: Closed to goods traffic
Location

Dunchurch railway station was a railway station serving Dunchurch in the English county of Warwickshire on the Rugby to Leamington line.

Among the many schemes to build a line between Rugby and Leamington was one by the Rugby, Leamington and Warwick Railway Company. This later became known as the Rugby and Leamington Railway and received royal assent on 13 August 1846. The undertaking was sold to the London and North Western Railway on 17 November 1846 and the line opened on 1 March 1851.

When the line opened there were only two intermediate stations (at Birdingbury and Marton) despite Dunchurch's population of 6,061 at the time. Dunchurch had to wait more than 20 years before the LNWR opened the station at the point where the railway crossed beneath the road to Coventry (now the A45 trunk road) 1¾ miles west of the village.

Dunchurch station received the same service as the other intermediate stations. Bradshaw's July 1922 timetable shows 10 trains a day to Rugby and 9 trains to Leamington Spa. The service was unchanged in the timetable of July 1938.

The station closed to passengers on 15 June 1959 and closed to freight on 2 November 1964.

Preceding station	Disused railways	Following station
Rugby	London and North Western Railway; Leamington to Rugby line	Birdingbury
