= Cawston =

Cawston is the name of various places:

In Canada:

- Cawston, British Columbia

In England:

- Cawston, Norfolk
- Cawston, Warwickshire
- Cawston, Nottinghamshire
