= Marton railway station =

Marton railway station may refer to:

- Marton railway station (North Yorkshire), on the Esk Valley line in Middlesbrough, North Yorkshire, England
- Marton railway station (Warwickshire), a former station on the Leamington–Rugby line in Marton, Warwickshire, England
- Marton railway station, Manawatu-Wanganui, on the Marton–New Plymouth Line and the North Island Main Trunk, New Zealand
