= Birdingbury railway station =

Disused railway station in Birdingbury, Rugby, England

Birdingbury
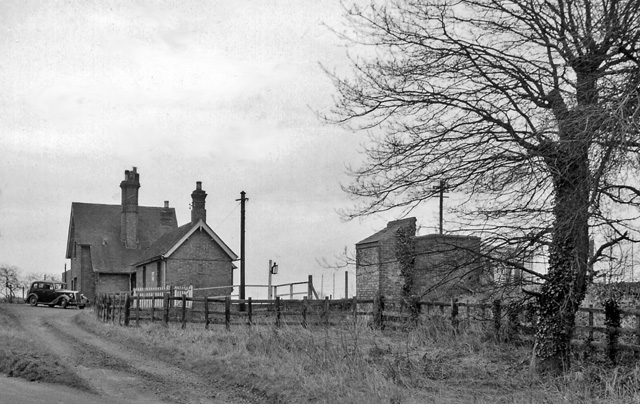
- Birdingbury station in 1962.

General information
- Location: Birdingbury, Rugby; England
- Coordinates: 52.31899°N 1.36695°W
- Grid reference: SP432692
- Platforms: 2

Other information
- Status: Disused

History
- Original company: LNWR
- Pre-grouping: LNWR
- Post-grouping: London, Midland and Scottish Railway; London Midland Region of British Railways

Key dates
- 1 March 1851: Station opens
- 15 June 1959: Station closes
Location

Birdingbury railway station was a railway station serving the village of Birdingbury, and the slightly more distant villages of Bourton-on-Dunsmore and Frankton, in the English county of Warwickshire on the Rugby to Leamington line.

Among the many schemes to build a line between Rugby and Leamington was one by the Rugby, Leamington and Warwick Railway Company. This later became known as the Rugby and Leamington Railway and received Royal assent on 13 August 1846. It was sold to the London and North Western Railway almost immediately on 17 November 1846.

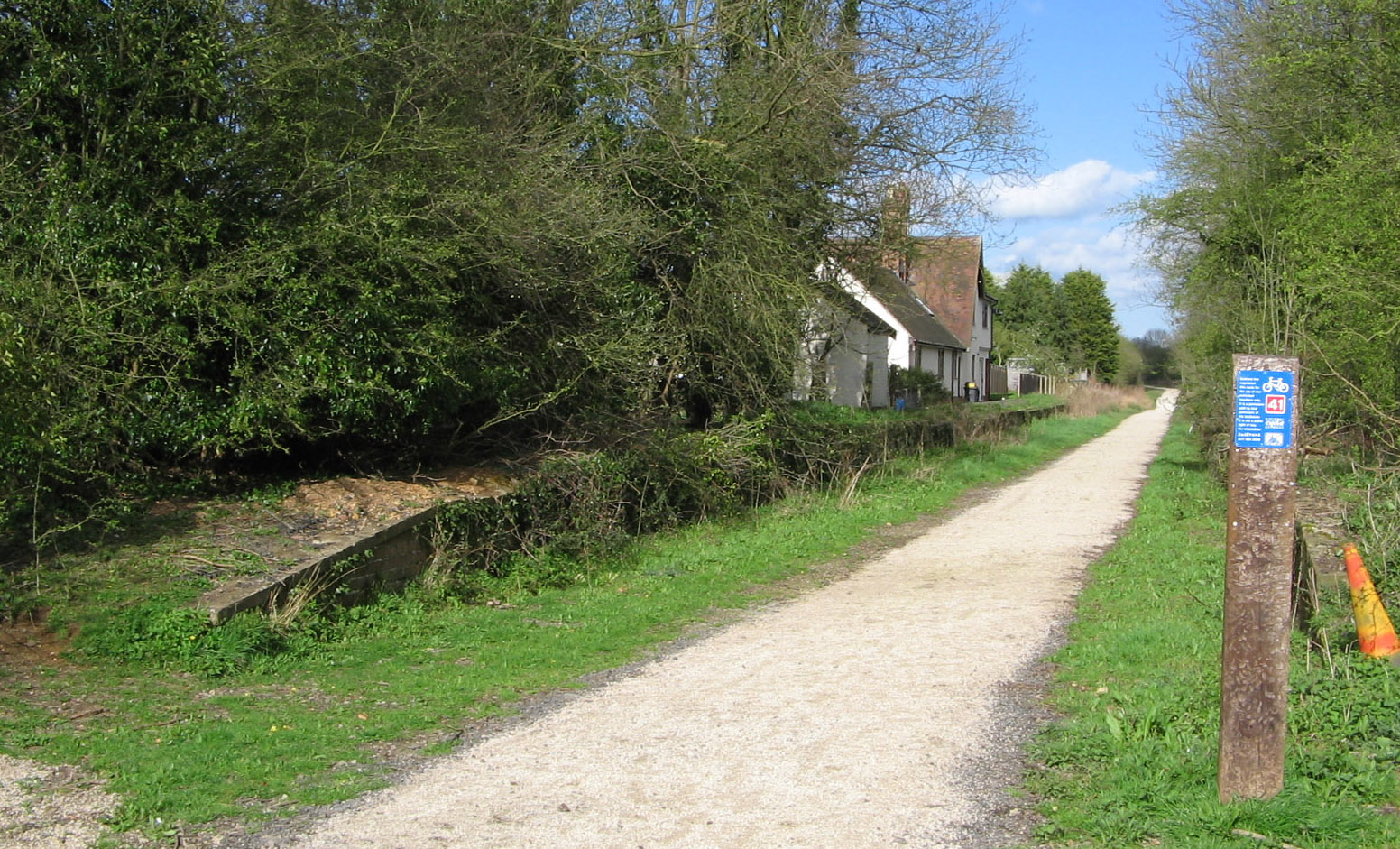
Birdingbury station in 2005

It was not, however, until 1 March 1851 that the line opened with stations at Birdingbury and Marton, that at Dunchurch opening in 1871. Originally it was a single line, but was doubled in the 1880s, and the driveway leading to its level crossing was private property used by arrangement with the owners.

The station building was of plain but substantial brick-built design and, on the opposite down platform, there was a waiting room with an awning (not present on the main platform). On the up side was a short double head shunt, with a siding leading to a loading stage. Unusually, on each platform was a small lever frame which could be used when the signal box was closed.

At grouping in 1923 it became part of the London Midland and Scottish Railway.

The goods yard closed in August 1953 and its track was lifted almost immediately. The station closed to passengers on 15 June 1959 when the Rugby and Leamington local service ended the track was lifted from Southam and is now a cycleway. The station buildings are now a private dwelling.

Preceding station	Disused railways	Following station
Dunchurch	London and North Western Railway; Leamington to Rugby line	Marton
