= Rugby Western Relief Road =

Road in Warwickshire, England

Coordinates: 52.3708°N 1.29551°W

The Rugby Western Relief Road (RWRR) is a 3.7-mile (6 km) single carriageway bypass road which is on the outskirts of Rugby, Warwickshire, England. The £36.6 million scheme includes a £17.08 million contribution from the Department for Transport and was expected to be completed by the end of 2009 but the date was put back by a year, eventually opening in September 2010. There was also much speculation that the project went well over budget.

== Planning and pre-construction ==
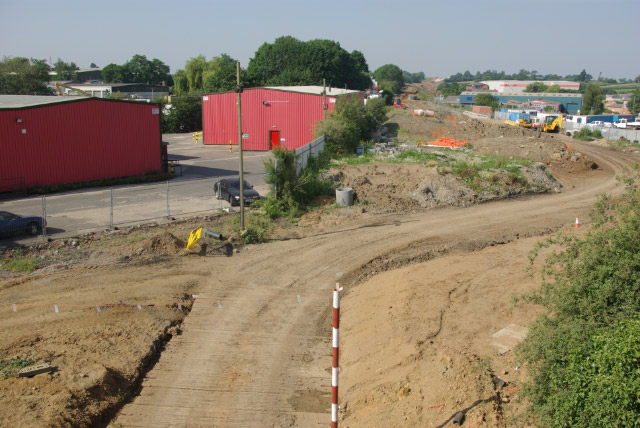
The northern section of the road under construction

Public consultation regarding the roads was started in November 1997 about a decade before construction began and ended two months later in January 1998. The original road plan had it running through Cawston and not around it but the extra funding was quickly found to change this. In September 2002 Rugby Borough Council had finalised and submitted their plans which were accepted in October that year. In December 2005 the Department for Transport approved Compulsory Purchase and Side Roads Orders, albeit with slight modifications to the plan regarding the extreme southern end of the road. The construction company Carillion, who have also worked on the M6 toll and the 2009 M6 extension, were awarded the contract.

Special consideration has been taken to reduce the environmental impact of the new road. Since 2002 the County Council and Carillion worked with Penny Anderson Associates Limited to protect local wildlife, especially local bats and badgers. Elsewhere over 15,000 trees were due to be planted and 2 miles (3.2 km) of new hedgerows laid. 25 acres (100,000 m^{2}) of wildflowers would be planted and several 'balancing pools' dug to try to help cancel out the negative environmental impact of the new road.

== Route and construction ==
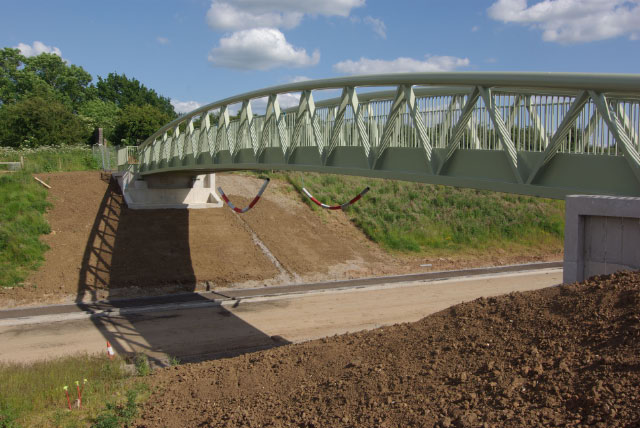
The southern section of the road near completion

The road leaves the existing A4071 just west of the village of Cawston, itself just 0.6 miles (1 km) outside Rugby. From there it skirts the western side of the town, crossing the A428 in New Bilton before cutting through the north of the town to join the A426 which in turn joins the M6 motorway just north of the town. Much of the route follows the old Rugby to Leamington railway line.

Work was begun in August 2007, nearly ten years after public consultation began. After months of building temporary service routes, major earthworking started in May 2008 along the southern section of the road. By the start of September that year tarmac was starting to be laid on this section and earthworking was starting elsewhere. For the rest of the year the roundabout at the south end of the road, along with strengthening of existing bridges started. In January 2009 industrial contaminants were found on a part of the proposed route on land formerly owned by Cemex, one of whose plants are next to the road. These however were quickly identified and removed. In March 2009 a roundabout was completed on the A4071 which takes drivers off it and onto the Relief Road. During construction local school children and interested members of the public were able to have planned visits to the site.

In July 2009 the bridge that took the Lawford Road over the disused railway was taken down and the Lawford Road was diverted to make way for what became the largest signalised junction in Warwickshire. In November 2009 the southern section from the A4071 to the Lawford Road was waiting to be topped off. Further north up the route the earthworks were completed.

On 19 June 2010 the southern section of the road from Potford's Dam to Lawford Road opened to traffic. This was preceded by a charity open day of the route allowing local people to explore the route in safety. The remainder of the route was opened on 10 September 2010.

== Effects of road ==
A study was carried out in September 2011 by Warwickshire County Council to discover what effect the new road was having on traffic levels on other roads it was built to relieve. The results indicated that traffic on Bilton Lane had dropped by 79 per cent, the A4071 Main Street in Bilton was down 28 per cent, the number of vehicles using the A426 Newbold Road had fallen by 26 per cent, and the A428 at Church Lawford was down 14 per cent.
