= Leamington Spa (Avenue) railway station =

Former railway station in England

Leamington Spa (Avenue)
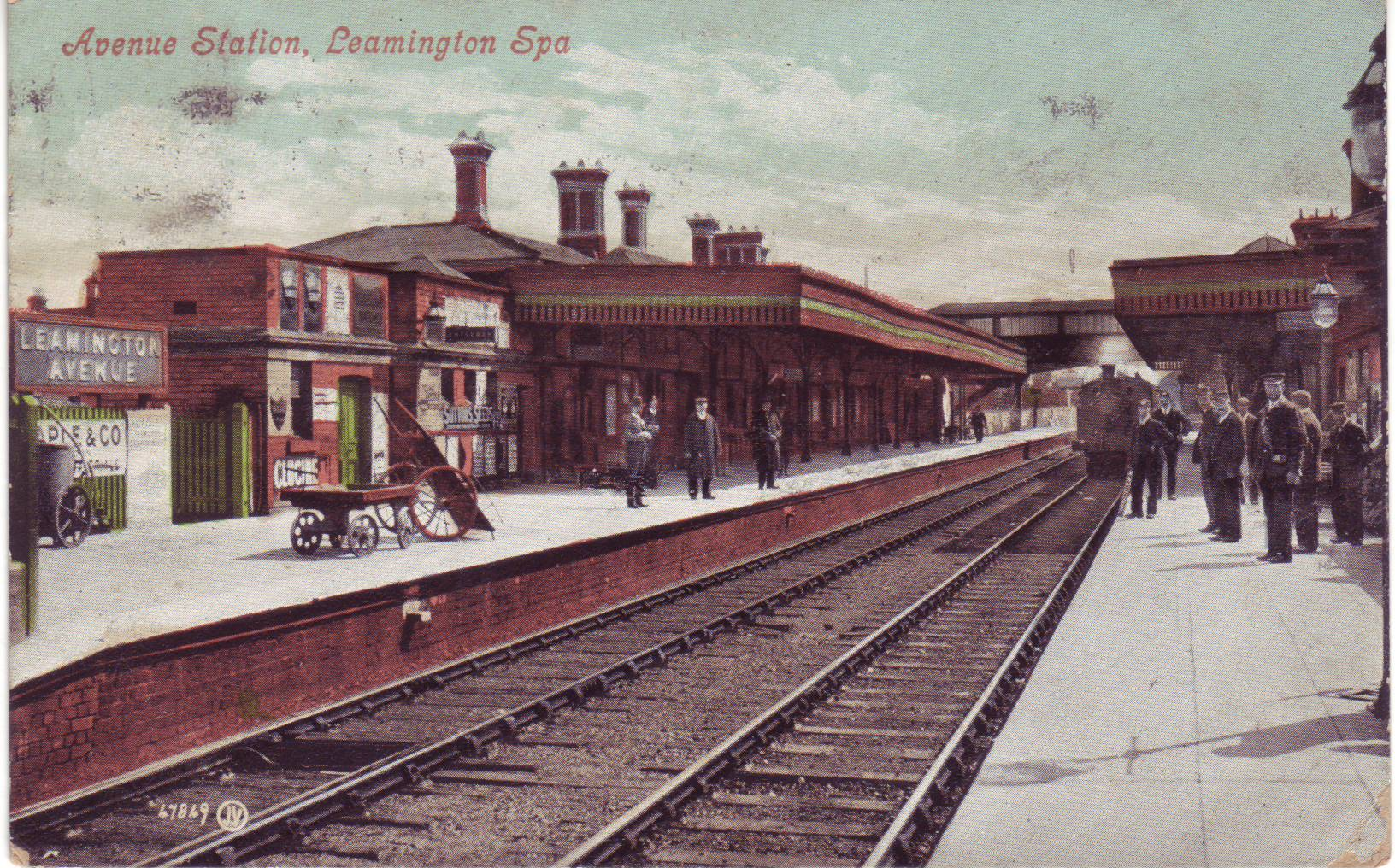
- Leamington Spa Avenue station in 1918

General information
- Location: Leamington Spa, Warwick; England
- Coordinates: 52.2852°N 1.5378°W
- Platforms: 2

Other information
- Status: Disused

History
- Original company: LNWR
- Pre-grouping: LNWR
- Post-grouping: London, Midland and Scottish Railway; London Midland Region of British Railways

Key dates
- February 1854: Station opens
- 18 January 1965: Station closed
Location

Leamington Spa Avenue railway station was a station serving Leamington Spa, Warwickshire. It opened in 1854, and was located immediately to the north of the current surviving Leamington Spa railway station, it offered services to Coventry, Rugby and Weedon. It closed in 1965.

== History ==
It was opened in February 1854 by the London and North Western Railway (LNWR), three years after the line from Coventry to Leamington was extended from its original terminus at Milverton into the centre of Leamington, and joined end-on to the branch line to Rugby. It was built alongside the Great Western Railway's Leamington station (which is still in operation) and provided a more convenient station in Leamington than the LNWR's original Milverton terminus. The original station was temporary, and made from wood, it was rebuilt as a permanent brick station in 1860.

Leamington Spa Avenue provided passenger services towards Coventry, Rugby and, from 1895 Weedon via Daventry. The local passenger services to Weedon were withdrawn in 1958, and those to Rugby in 1959, but the lines remained open a few years longer for freight. The Coventry service remained until it too was withdrawn, and the station closed in 1965 as a part of the Beeching cuts. The Coventry line continued for freight, and was diverted into the former Great Western station and the branches towards Rugby and Weedon were closed. The site of the station was levelled in 1977 to make way for redevelopment. The site was originally covered by a garage, bus depot and public car park. In the late 2010s the site was cleared to make way for low rise residential housing and offices.

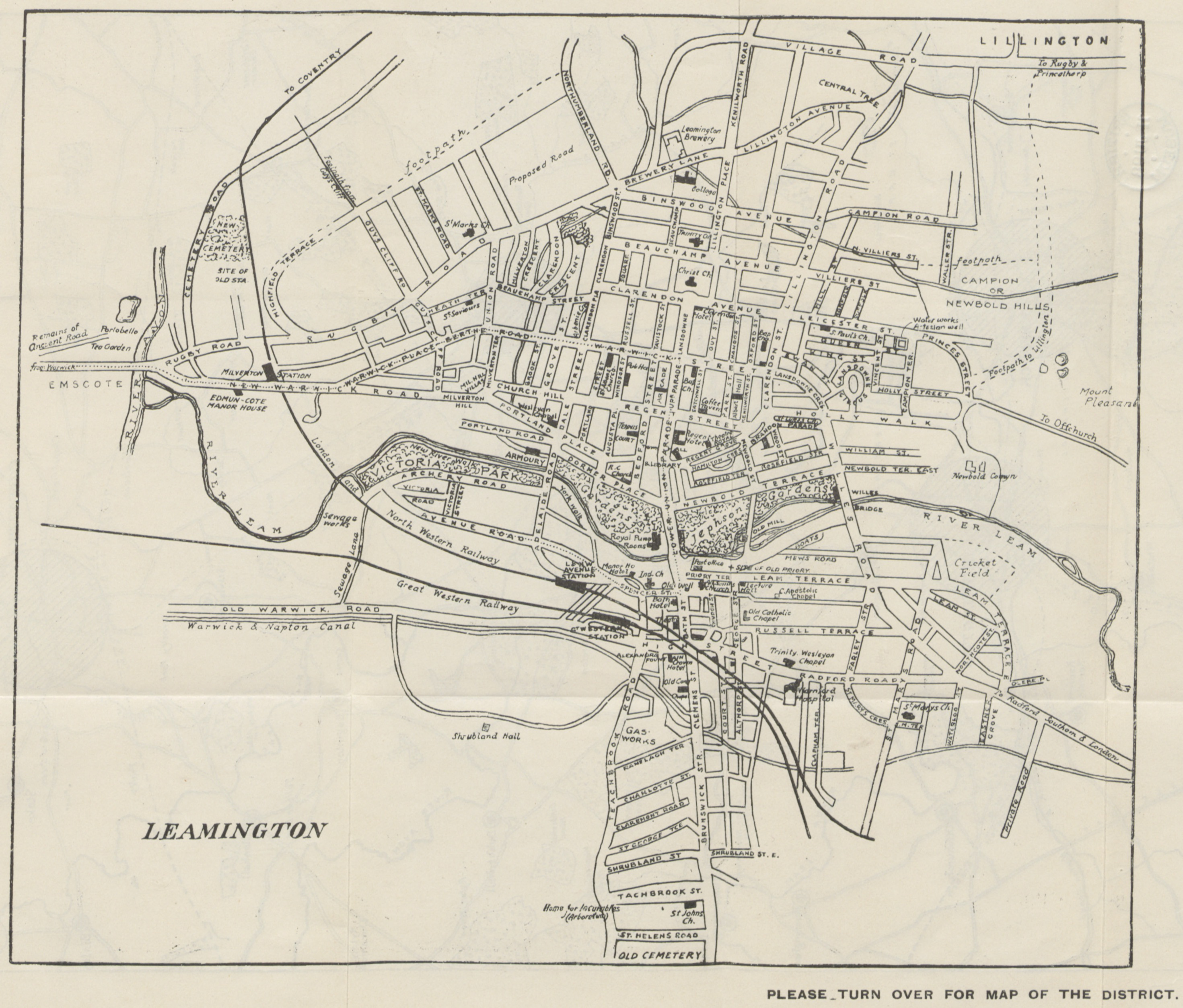
1898 map of Leamington showing the position of Milverton, Avenue and the GWR stations

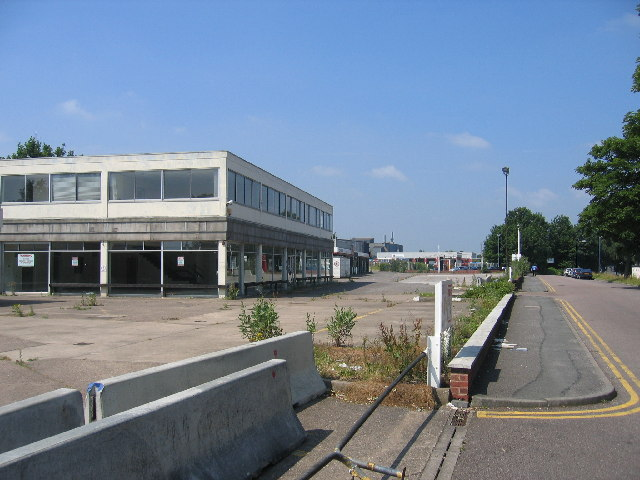
Site of Avenue station in 2005

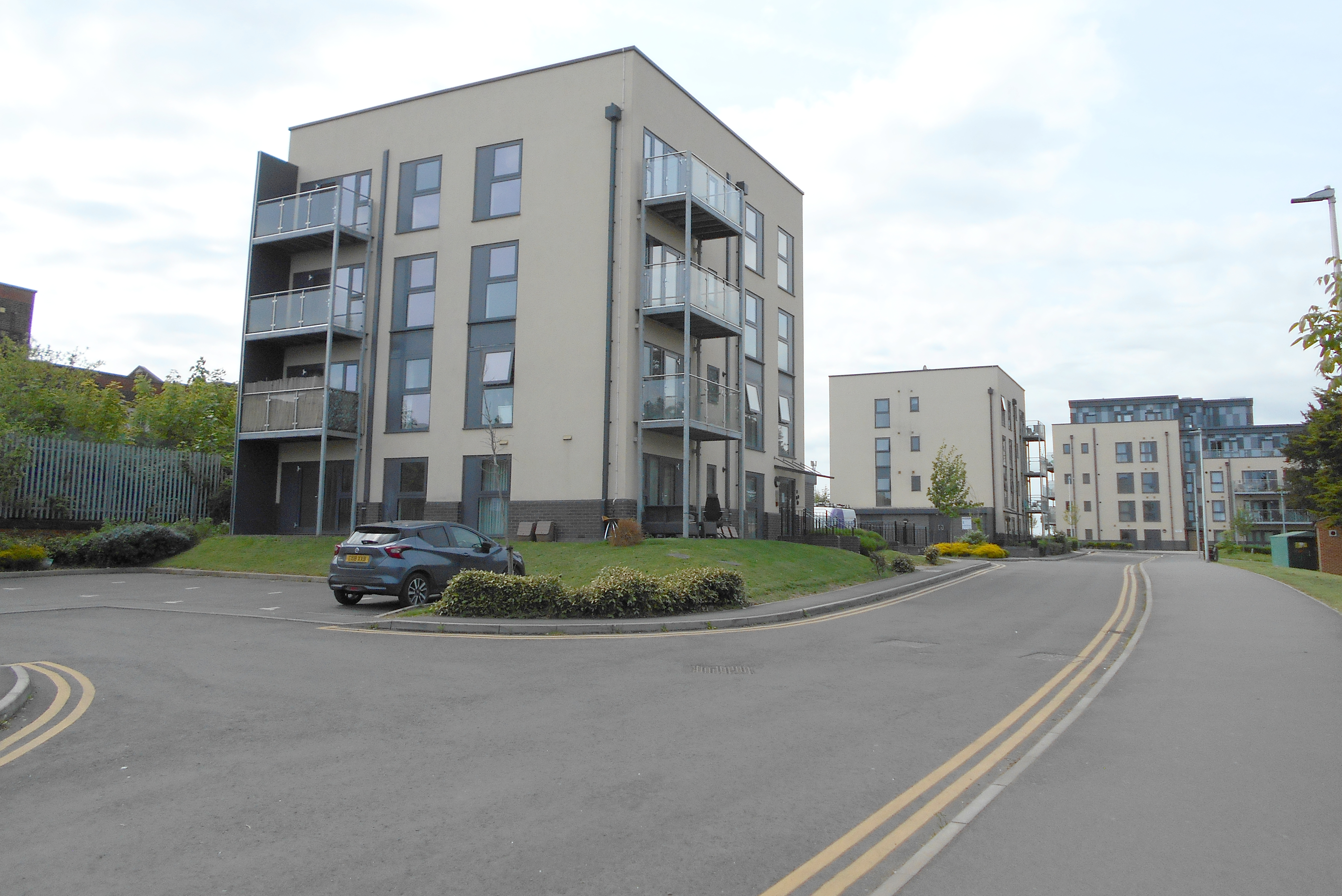
The site of Avenue station in 2023

Preceding station	Disused railways	Following station
Terminus	London and North Western Railway; Weedon–Leamington Spa line	Southam & Long; Itchington; Line and station closed
Terminus	London and North Western Railway; Leamington–Rugby line	Marton; Line and station closed
Warwick (Milverton); Line open, station closed	London and North Western Railway; Coventry–Leamington line	Terminus
