= New Bilton =

Suburb of Rugby, Warwickshire, England

Coordinates: 52.372836°N 1.276437°W

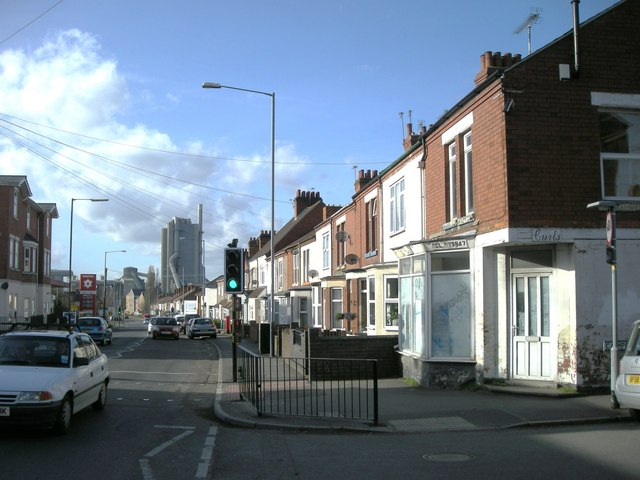
- Lawford Road, New Bilton, looking towards the cement works.

- Location within Warwickshire
- Population: 8,166 (2021 census)
- District: Rugby
- Shire county: Warwickshire
- Region: West Midlands
- Country: England
- Sovereign state: United Kingdom

New Bilton is a suburb of Rugby, Warwickshire, in England, situated to the west of the town centre. New Bilton is also a ward of the Borough of Rugby whose population at the 2021 census was 8,166. The area straddles the A428 main road, known locally as Lawford Road.

== History ==
The area was historically within the parish of Bilton (which has also been absorbed into Rugby) it emerged as a distinct settlement during the Victorian era, developing into a suburb primarily to house workers involved with the local cement industry and brick making industry; the cement industry still continues but the brick making industry has since died out. The area north of Lawford Road was entirely built-up by 1905, but the area south of the road was developed later in the 20th century.

In 1867 New Bilton became a separate ecclesiastical parish from Bilton, and the parish church of St Oswald on Lawford Road was consecrated, later being enlarged in 1881. In 2012, the church was renamed St Matthew and St Oswald's, after the nearby St Matthew church was closed.

Despite being directly adjacent to it, much of New Bilton only became a part of Rugby in 1932 when the town's boundaries were expanded.

== Features ==
New Bilton comprises a mixture of Victorian terraced housing, and some later 20th century former council housing and a number of semi-detached houses. Some modern housing has been built on the former GEC site to the rear of Avenue Road up to the limestone quarries of Cemex. New Bilton is served by two primary schools; St Matthew's Bloxam CE Primary School and St Oswald's C of E Primary School. The local community are served by the Holly Bush pub, a number of local shops, including a Co-op store, and a Post Office based in a petrol station on Lawford Road.

Webb Ellis Road in New Bilton is home to the grounds of Rugby Lions Rugby Football Club, Rugby Cricket Club and the Rugby Lawn Tennis Club.

The New Bilton area is visually dominated by the large Cemex (former Rugby Cement) works, which towers to a height of 400 feet (120 m), A large disused quarry associated with the cement industry is located off Parkfield Road. In 2020 plans were put forward for this quarry to be filled in with spoil from the construction of the High Speed 2 railway line, which would involve bringing a short section of the former Rugby to Leamington railway line into use to deliver the material by train.

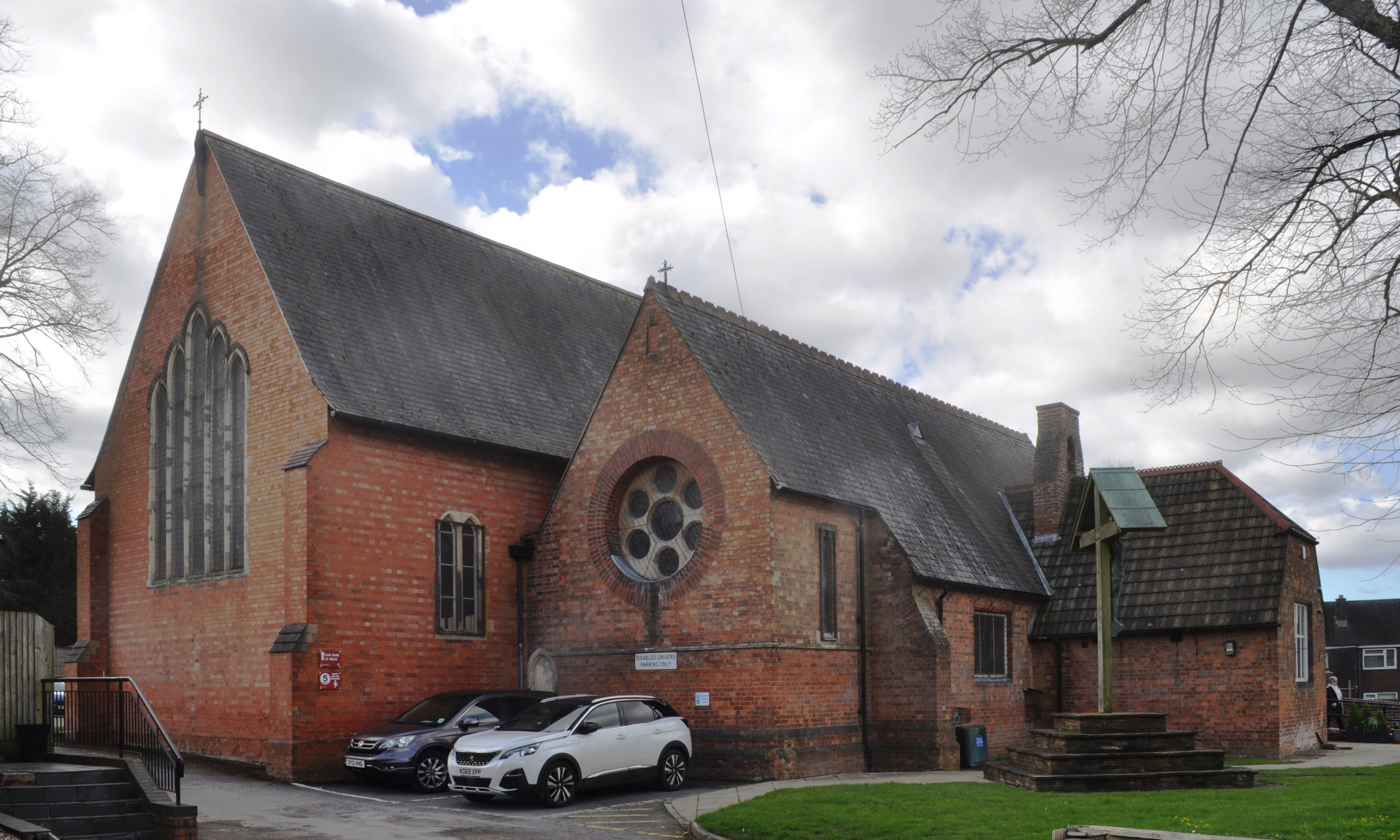
St Matthew and St Oswald's Church.

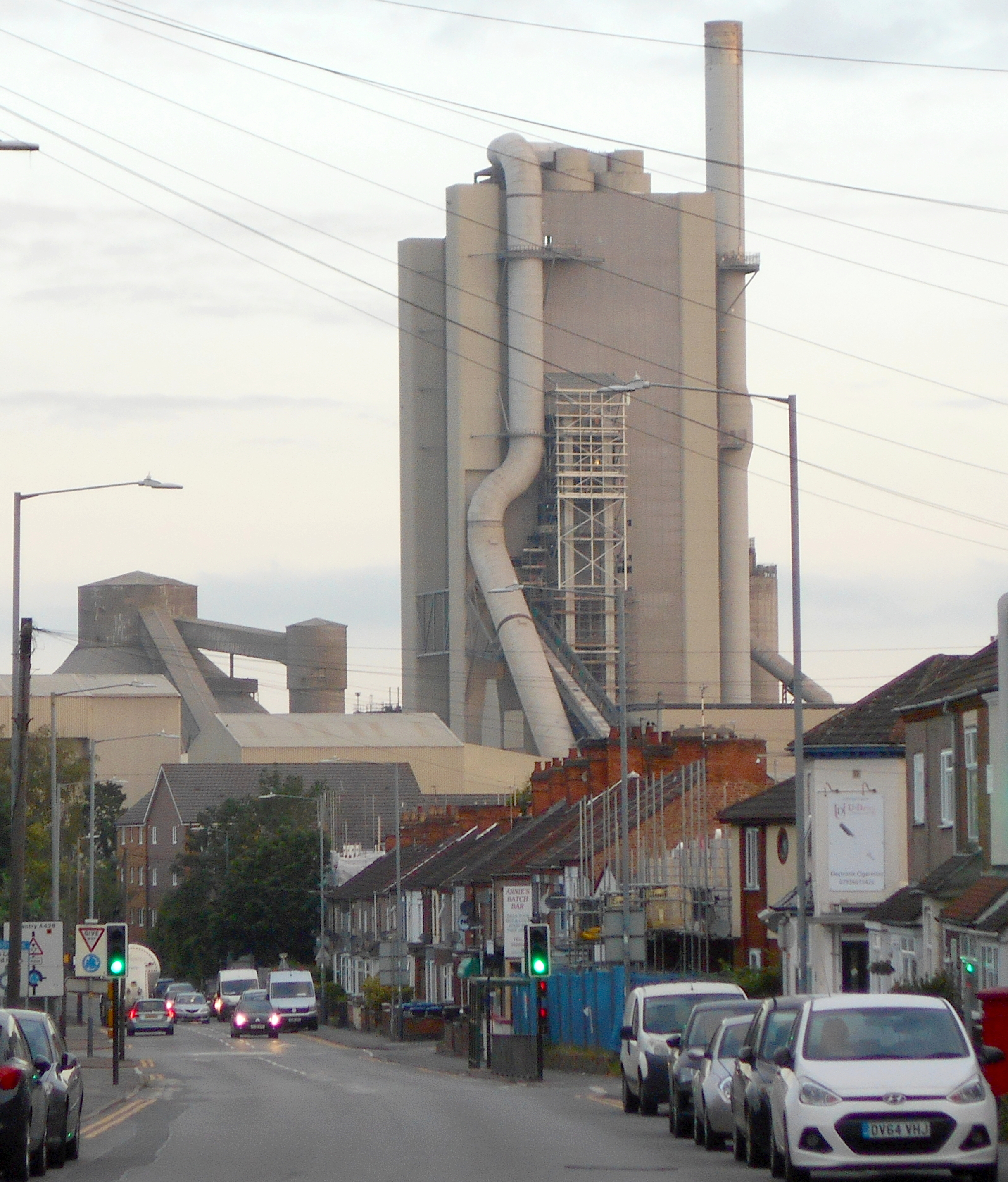
Cemex cement works

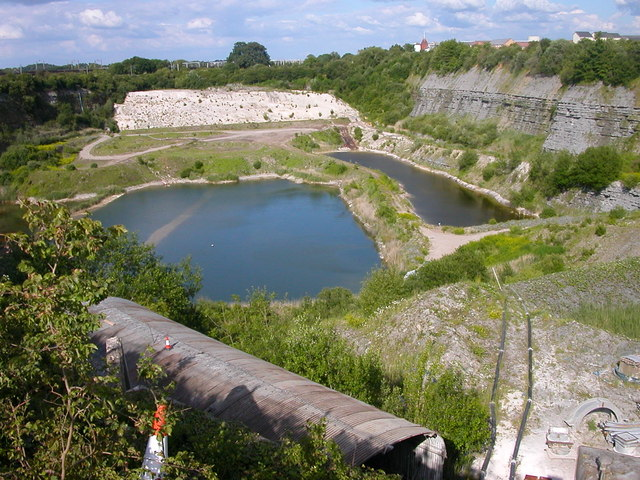
Parkfield Road disused quarry
