= Warwick (Milverton) railway station =

Former railway station in England

Warwick (Milverton)
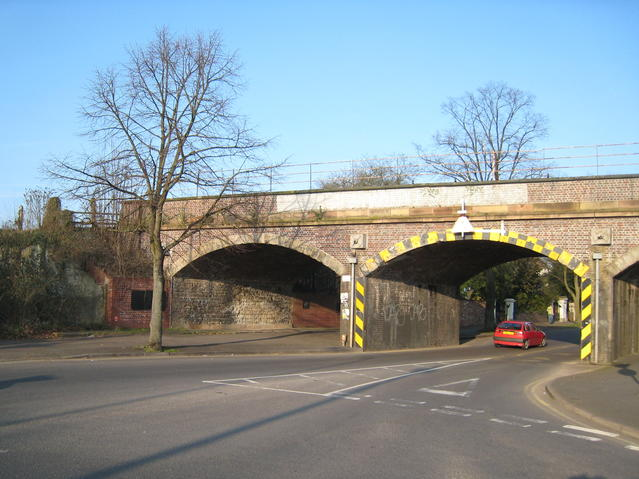
- Site of Milverton Station today.

General information
- Location: Royal Leamington Spa, Warwick District; England
- Coordinates: 52.28971°N 1.553264°W
- Platforms: 2

Other information
- Status: Disused

History
- Original company: L&BR
- Pre-grouping: LNWR
- Post-grouping: London, Midland and Scottish Railway; London Midland Region of British Railways

Key dates
- 9 December 1844: Opened as Leamington
- 1854: Renamed Warwick (Milverton)
- 1856: Renamed Warwick
- 1857: Renamed Warwick (Milverton)
- 1875: Renamed Leamington Milverton (Warwick)
- 1876: Renamed Milverton (for Warwick)
- 1884: Rebuilt and renamed Warwick (Milverton)
- 1952: Renamed Leamington Spa (Milverton) for Warwick
- 18 January 1965: Station closed
Location

Warwick (Milverton) railway station was a railway station in Warwickshire on the former LNWR route between Leamington Spa and Coventry. The station opened in 1844 under the name of Leamington and was the original terminus of the then single line from Coventry. In 1851 the line was extended into Leamington town centre, and joined end-on to the branch line to Rugby, and in 1854 a new station was opened on this extension called Leamington Spa (Avenue), closer to the town centre and directly alongside Leamington's GWR station (which is still in operation). Milverton station was rebuilt when the line was doubled in 1884.

The station was closed as a part of the Beeching closures in 1965, although the line remained and remains open. The station buildings have been demolished and a car dealership built over the site of the goods yard. The entrance of the original terminus station and station master's house were located north of Rugby Road on what is now the residential street The Spinney. The former location of the second and final station entrance is just west of the railway bridge on Warwick New Road, and the platforms are now an overgrown area adjacent to the footpath leading to Rugby Road.

== Name changes ==
Milverton station was originally intended as a compromise to serve both Warwick and Leamington Spa, however it was never very successful at serving either, as it was located some distance from the centres of both towns. This was reflected in the multiple name changes throughout the station's life, detailed below:

- 1844 Leamington
- 1854 Warwick (Milverton)
- 1856 Warwick
- 1857 Warwick (Milverton)
- 1875 Leamington Milverton (Warwick)
- 1876 Milverton (for Warwick)
- 1884 Warwick (Milverton)
- 1952 Leamington Spa (Milverton) for Warwick

Preceding station	Historical railways	Following station
Kenilworth; Line open, station open	London and North Western Railway; Coventry to Leamington Line	Leamington Spa (Avenue); Line and station closed
