= Rugby–Leamington line =

Disused railway in Warwickshire, England

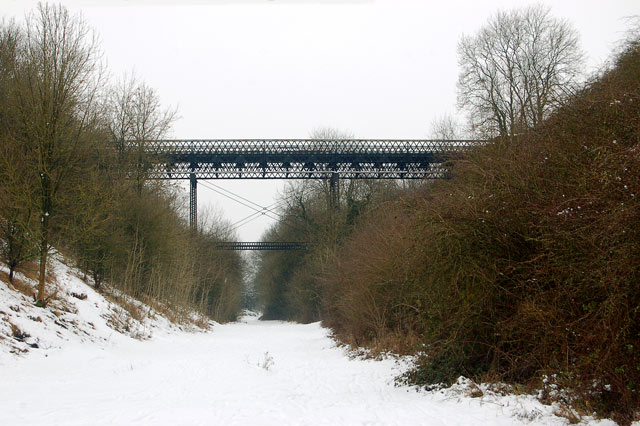
- Spanning the cutting at Marton Junction, this pioneering wrought-iron bridge is of trussed lattice girder construction

Service
- Type: Heavy rail

History
- Opened: 1851

Technical
- Line length: 15 mi (24 km)
- Track gauge: 4 ft 8 1/2 in (1,435 mm)

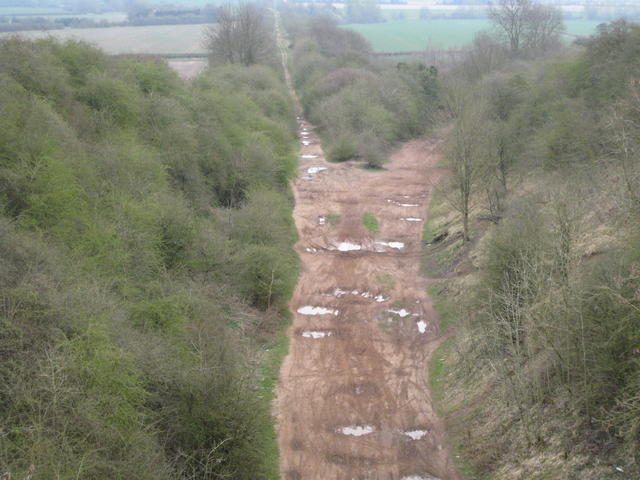
The site of Marton Junction in 2009: The line to Rugby ran straight ahead, whilst the line to Weedon diverged to the right.

The Rugby to Leamington Line was a railway line running from Rugby to Leamington Spa. It was a 15-mile (24 km) branch line built by the London and North Western Railway (LNWR) and opened in 1851. The branch connected Leamington with the mainline from London to Birmingham (now the West Coast Main Line) which had been opened in 1838 by the LNWR's predecessor, the London and Birmingham Railway (L&BR).

== History ==
Rugby and Leamington Railway Act 1846
- Act of Parliament
- Parliament of the United Kingdom
- Long title: An Act for making a Railway from the London and Birmingham Railway in the Parish oi Rugby in the County of Warwick to Leamington in the County of Warwick.
- Citation: 9 & 10 Vict. c. ccclxviii

Dates
- Royal assent: 13 August 1846

Text of statute as originally enacted

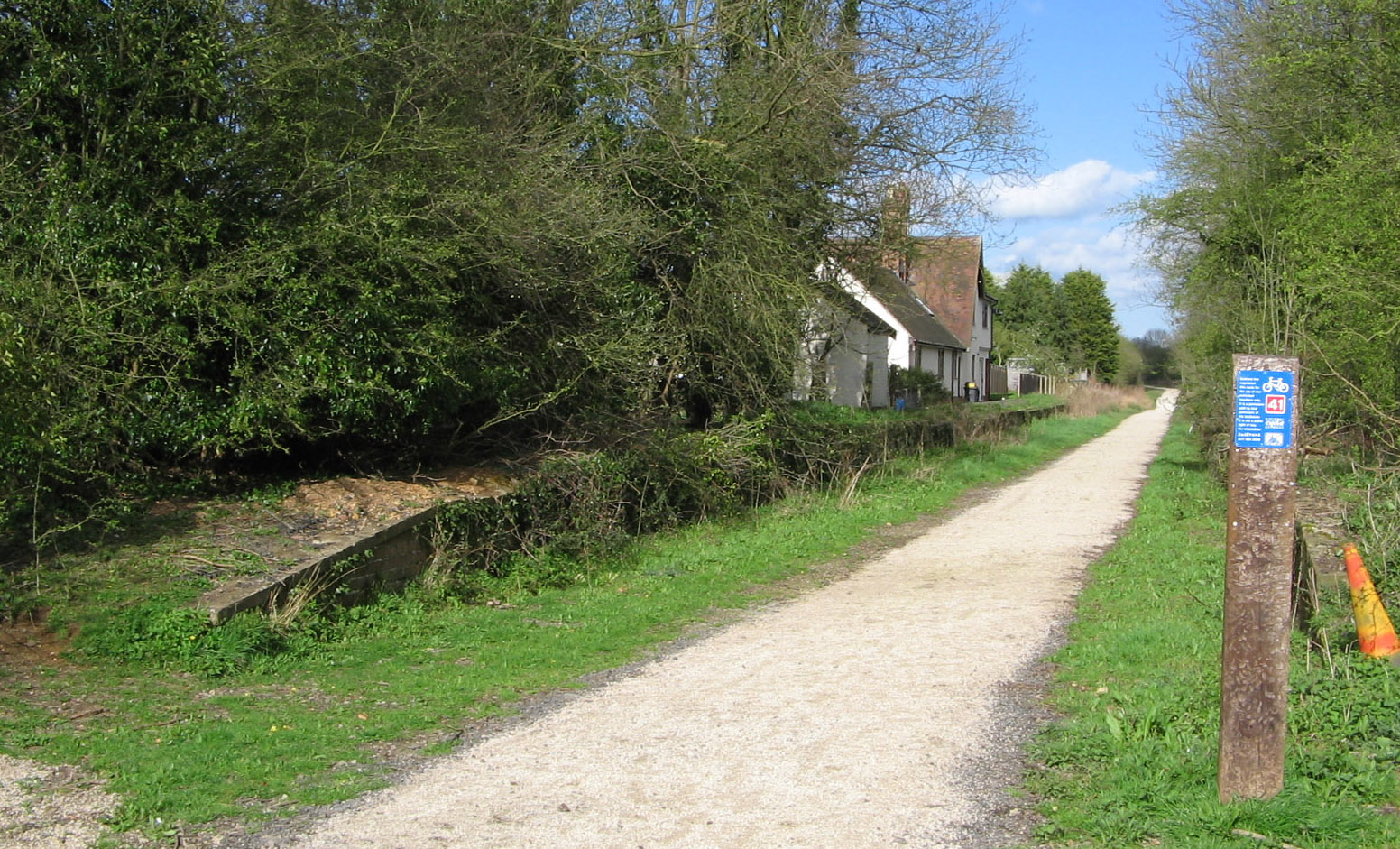
The former station at Birdingbury in 2005 showing the station buildings and platforms.

The original proposal for the line were promoted by the Rugby and Leamington Railway Company. The Rugby and Leamington Railway Act 1846 (9 & 10 Vict. c. ccclxviii) received royal assent on 13 August 1846. The line was to be built and operated by the London and Birmingham Railway, which became part of the LNWR the following year.

At Rugby, the branch diverged from the main line at a junction west of Rugby railway station and ran south-west for 15 miles and eight chains to Leamington, where it was joined end-on to the LNWR's existing branch line from Coventry to Leamington, which had been extended into Leamington town centre from its original terminus at Milverton station, which had been on the edge of the town.

The line from Rugby to Leamington opened throughout on 1 March 1851. The first intermediate station at Marton was opened on 1 January 1852, Birdingbury station opened on 1 February 1853. In February 1854, Leamington Spa Avenue station opened which was closer to the town centre than the original Milverton station, and was alongside the rival Great Western Railway's (GWR) Leamington station. The station at Dunchurch was opened twenty years after the opening of the line on 2 October 1871. The line was originally built as single track, but as traffic grew the line was doubled in stages from Rugby between 1882 and 1884. The lines were designated Up to Rugby and Down to Leamington.

Local trains for Leamington used the down (north) end bay platforms at Rugby. At the other end of the line, services from Rugby ran through to Warwick (Milverton) and this practice continued until closure because the loco shed and servicing depot for the Rugby-Leamington-Coventry lines was at Milverton.

In 1895, a new junction was created when the LNWR's single track line from Weedon to Daventry was extended westward to join the Rugby to Leamington line at Marton Junction, which was two miles southwest of Marton station in a deep cutting through a ridge of high ground.

At Leamington, the LNWR used a single track connection facing Rugby to exchange goods trains with the adjacent Great Western Railway. This connection was doubled in 1908 in order to cope with the increased traffic.

The local passenger service was withdrawn by British Railways in June 1959, and the local goods sidings were closed in the early 1960s, however the line continued to see use as a diversionary route by both passenger and freight trains until 1965, during the electrification of the West Coast Main Line. When this finished the line was closed as a through route on 4 April 1966, and the line closed between Marton Junction and Leamington, with the remainder of the track singled. The only remaining traffic was goods trains serving the Rugby Cement works at both Rugby and Southam, the latter of which was located on a stub of the former line to Weedon and so required trains to reverse at Marton Junction. Trains to the cement works at Southam continued until June 1985, with the track being lifted two years later. Infrequent trains served the cement works at Rugby until July 1991. The track at this end remained, and remains in place however.

== Route ==
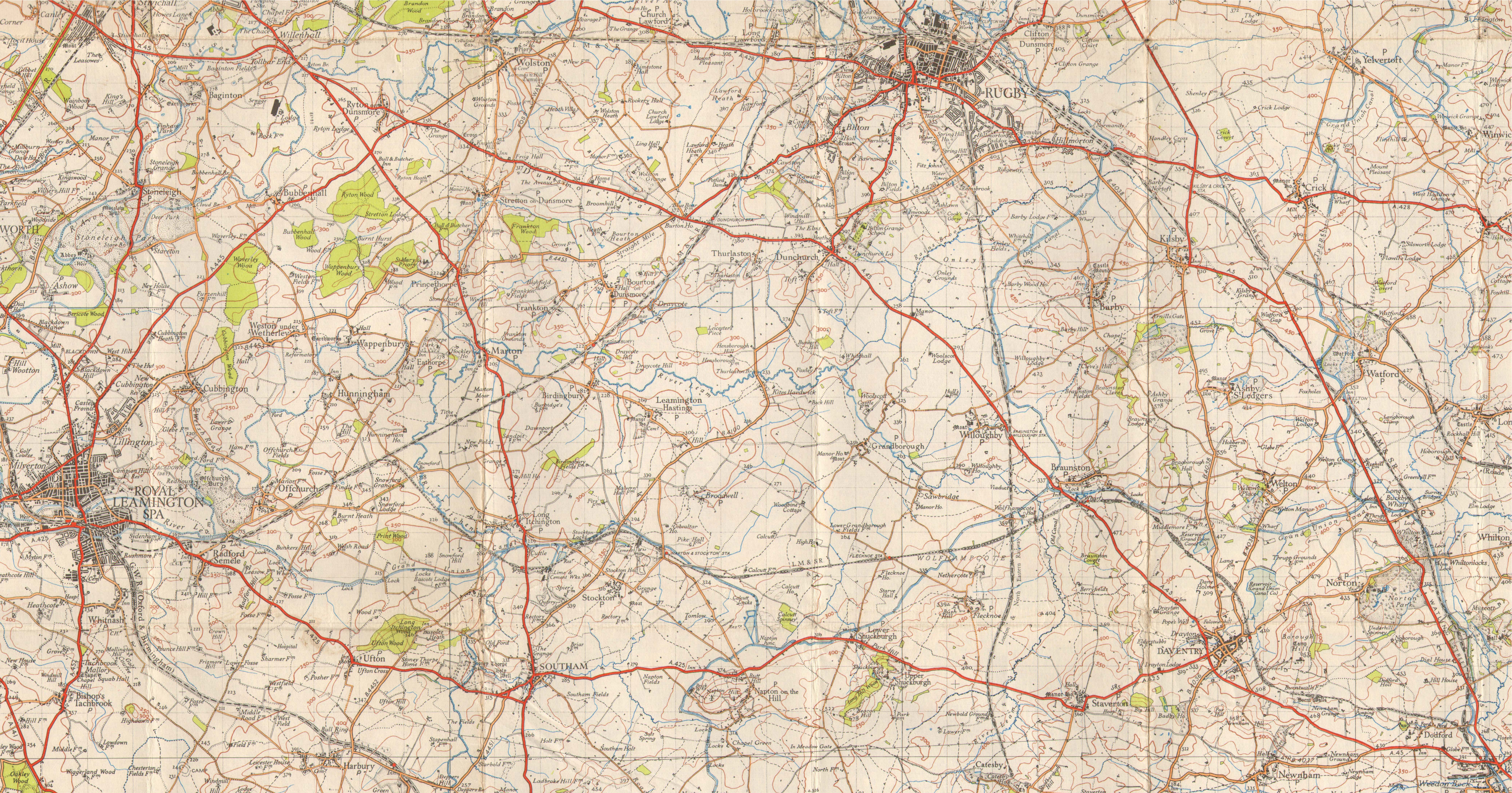
1946 Ordnance Survey map: The route of the Rugby-Leamington and Weedon-Leamington lines can be seen

From Rugby, the general course of the line was southwest as far as Hunningham after which it swung west for the last five miles into Leamington. Most of the route was straight and lightly graded. For the first few miles out of Rugby the line was mainly routed in shallow cuttings but west of Birdingbury it crossed the River Leam on a low viaduct. From there it ran across the flat open expanse of Marton Moor before cutting through high ground to follow the valley of the River Leam for the last few miles.

The route had three civil engineering features of note: the deep cutting at Marton Junction; the lofty wrought-iron bridge spanning the cutting; and the viaduct over the canal near Radford Semele.

The cutting, approximately 60 ft (18 m) deep, took the line through a north–south ridge of high ground south of Hunningham. An ancient track, Ridgeway Lane, ran along the top of the ridge and met the cutting at its deepest point so the LNWR built a single-span wrought-iron trussed lattice girder bridge to carry the lane over the railway. At the time it was built (1851) this was the longest such bridge ever constructed. In later years, four lattice columns and cross-ties were added to reinforce the original structure. Known locally as 'the high bridge', this impressive example of Victorian civil engineering is still standing.

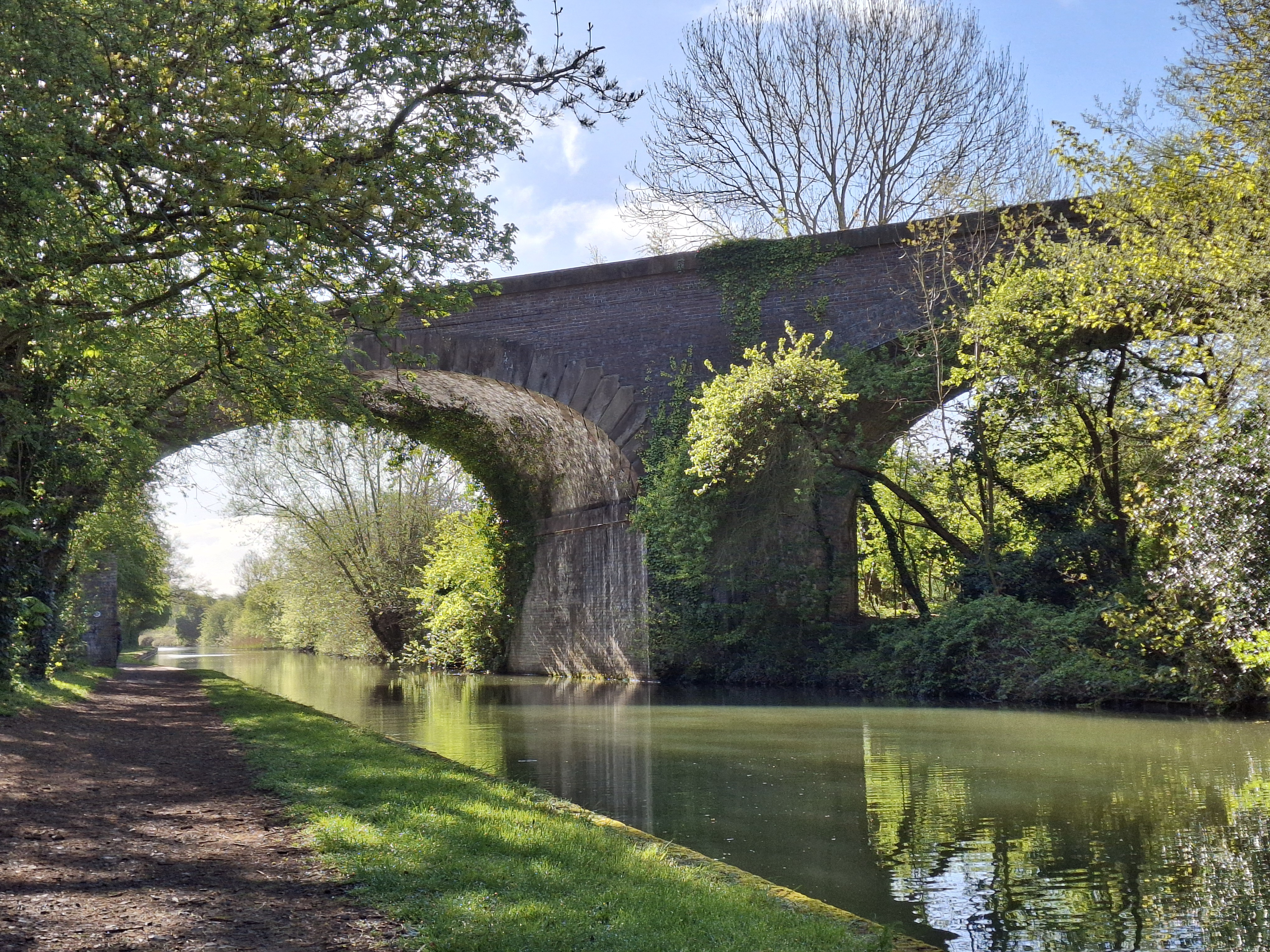
Disused railway viaduct over the Grand Union Canal near Offchurch, Warwickshire.

Two miles further west, the handsome five-arch brick-built Offchurch Viaduct carried the route over the Grand Union Canal and adjacent low ground: the arch above the canal itself was built with skewed courses. The viaduct still stands although the trackbed across it is fenced off.

== Remains ==
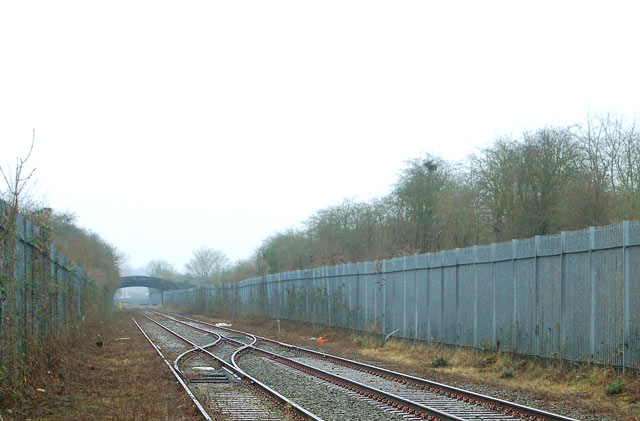
This siding near Rugby is all that remains of the Rugby–Leamington railway line.

At the Rugby end of the line the first half-mile of track is still in use as a siding. The rest of the line has been dismantled, and no track remains. Near Cawston part of the old track bed has been replaced by the Rugby Western Relief Road.

Much of the dismantled trackbed is intact but only a few sections are public rights of way. The trackbed from Draycote (southwest of the former Dunchurch station) to Birdingbury has been surfaced by Sustrans as part of National Cycle Network Route 41. The long straight stretch of trackbed from the A423 across Marton Moor to the cutting near Hunningham is mostly clear of undergrowth and is regularly used by walkers; however, there is no legal right of way and this section can be very muddy in winter.

The station houses at Dunchurch and Birdingbury are now private residences (even the platforms are still in place at Birdingbury) but there is little trace of Marton station itself and a small industrial estate occupies the site.

Further west, a 1.5-mile (2.4 km) stretch of trackbed from the Fosse Way to the Grand Union Canal, titled 'Offchurch Greenway' and also part of Route 41, is well surfaced and maintained, this is planned to be extended up to Birdingbury with construction originally scheduled to begin in summer 2021. West of the canal, the trackbed is on private land as far as the A425 road and beyond that most of the old railway has been built over.

Within Royal Leamington Spa itself, the route parallels the Chiltern Main Line for approximately 550 yards (500 m) east of Leamington Spa railway station on a series of brick viaducts that remain in situ. However some metal bridges over roads have been removed. There is no access to the viaducts, however the archways underneath are used by small businesses.
