= Kenilworth railway station =

Railway station in Warwickshire, England

Kenilworth
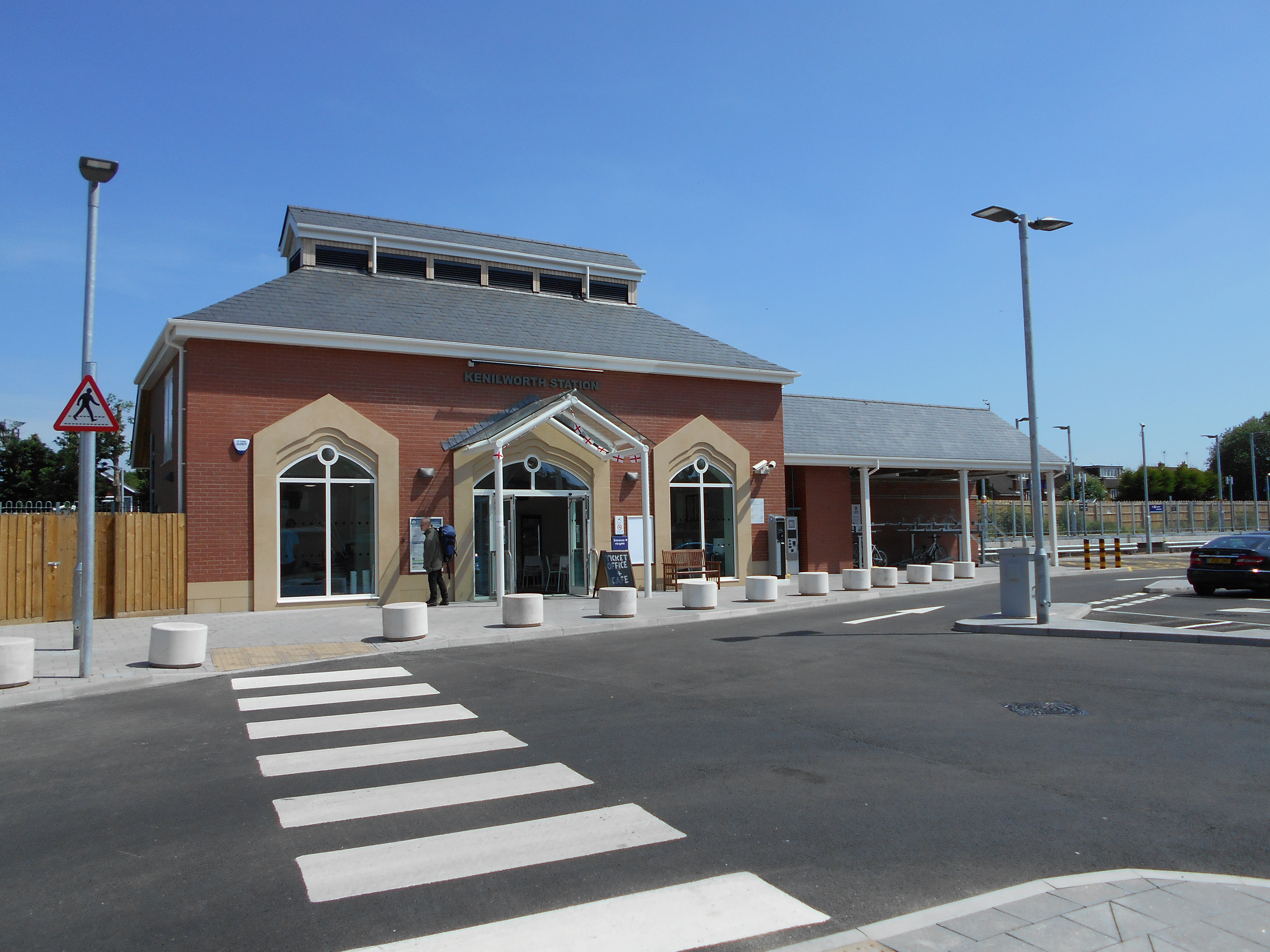
- The main building of the reopened Kenilworth station

General information
- Location: Kenilworth, Warwick; England
- Coordinates: 52.3429°N 1.5726°W
- Grid reference: SP291716
- Manager: West Midlands Railway
- Platforms: 1

Other information
- Station code: KNW

History
- Original company: London and Birmingham Railway
- Pre-grouping: London and North Western Railway
- Post-grouping: London Midland and Scottish Railway

Key dates
- 9 December 1844: Opened
- 1884: Rebuilt
- 18 January 1965: Closed
- 30 April 2018: Reopened

Passengers
- 2021/22: ▲78,960
- 2022/23: ▲0.139 million
- 2023/24: ▼0.138 million
- 2024/25: ▲0.181 million
- 2025/26: ▲0.244 million
Location
Notes
- Passenger statistics from the Office of Rail and Road

Kenilworth railway station serves the town of Kenilworth, Warwickshire, England; it is a stop on the Coventry to Leamington Line. The original Kenilworth station opened in 1844, before being rebuilt in 1884 and closed in 1965. In 2013, it was announced that the station would reopen in 2016; it finally reopened on 30 April 2018.

== History ==
=== Historic station ===
The original station opened on 9 December 1844 along with the line, it originally had a single platform, but soon after a passing loop and second platform was added. The original station was of sandstone construction, and built in the Italianate style. It was designed by Robert Dockray, the resident engineer of the London and Birmingham Railway. Part of the stone façade of the original 1844 station still exists, as it was reused as the entrance to the Kings Arms' Assembly Rooms on Station Road nearby. The station was rebuilt in 1884 when the line was upgraded to double track and a new cut-off line was opened from Kenilworth to Berkswell. The rebuilt station was built of brick in a Gothic style, and was designed by Mr. T W. Jones, of the London and North Western Railway Engineer's Office.

Passenger services were withdrawn from the line on 18 January 1965 as a result of the Reshaping of British Railways report, and the station was closed, although the line remained open for goods traffic. The cut-off line to Berkswell was closed in 1969, and much of the remaining line was singled during 1972, although some double track was retained through Kenilworth to form a passing loop a short distance north of the station site. Passenger services over the line were restarted in 1977, but as these were long distance, and not local services the station was not reopened.

The station's former goods yard and station buildings were let out to a local builders merchant, and remained in place until they were demolished in the 1980s. Two stained glass windows and a sign were salvaged from the old station building, and later incorporated into the new station after being donated by local residents.

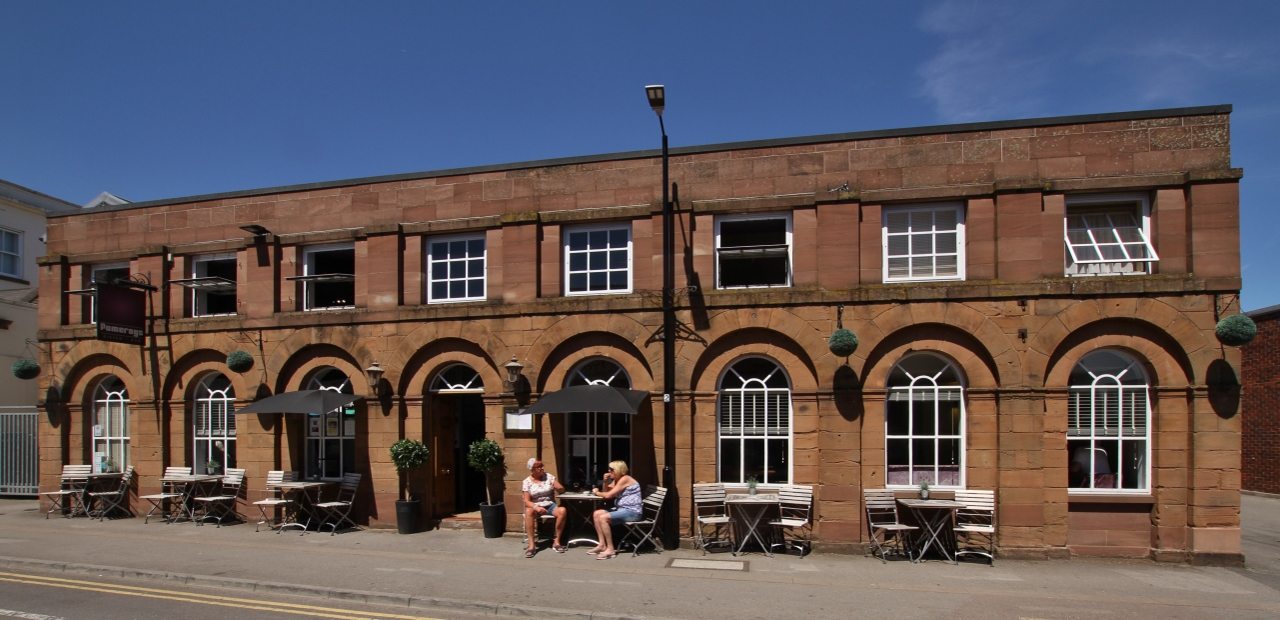
The remaining facade of the 1844 station, dismantled in 1884, reused on the Kings Arms assembly rooms on Station Road.

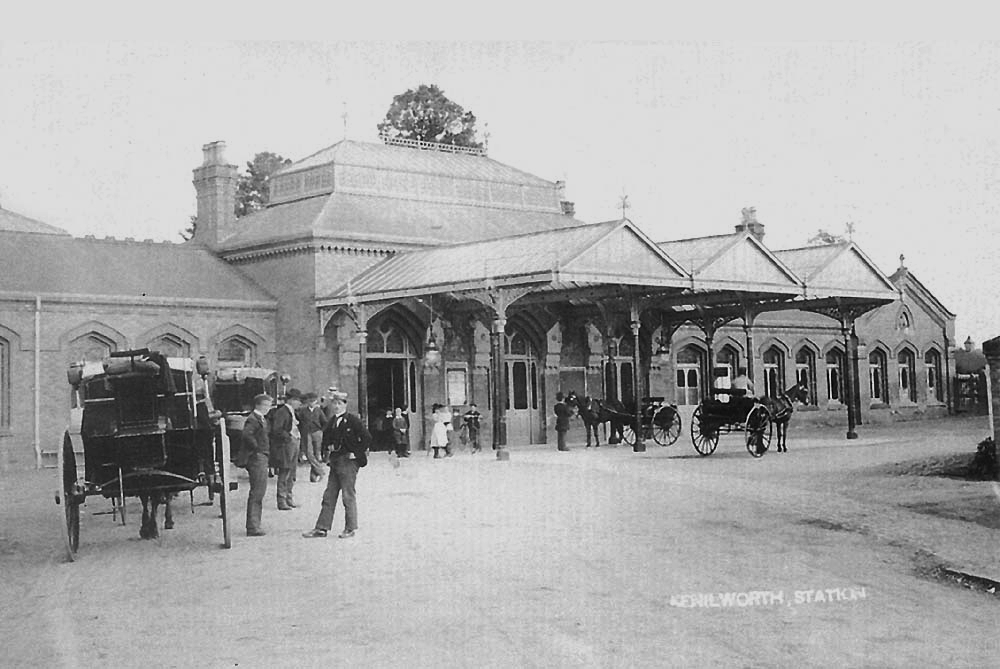
The second Kenilworth station in the late 19th century

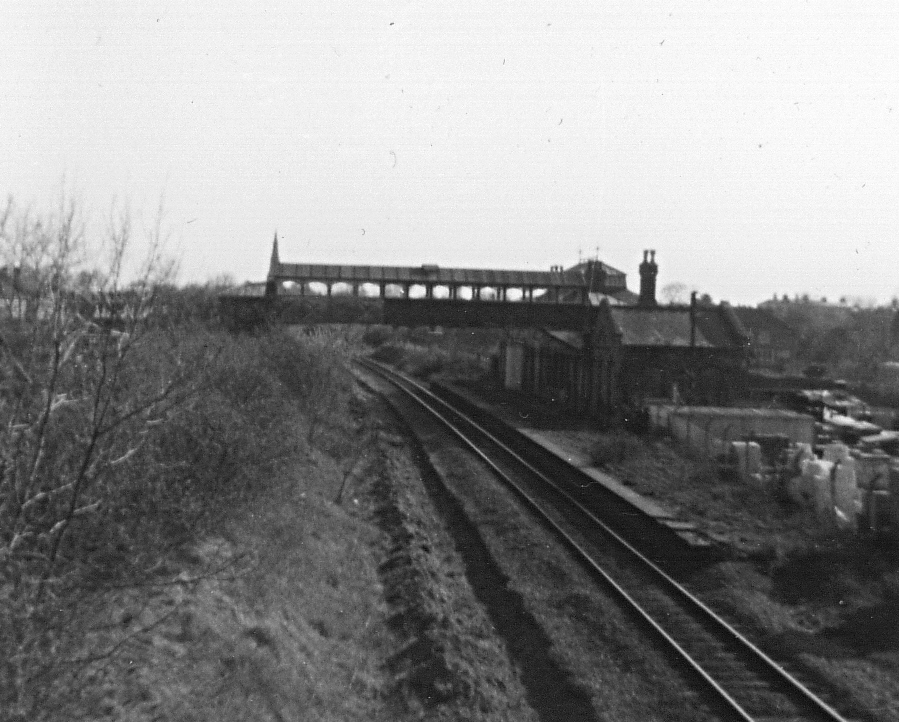
The remains of the station in 1977, twelve years after closure: one platform had been removed and the line had been singled

=== Reopening ===
In 2008, train operator CrossCountry and Warwickshire County Council supported the reopening and started to prepare a business case. It was included in the 2008–09 Warwickshire Local Transport Plan. In July 2009 it was announced that John Laing plc had been awarded a 20-year contract to design, build, and operate the new station, due to open in 2013. Planning permission was granted in April 2011 but funding was refused. In late 2011, John Laing successfully asked to withdraw from the contract as there was no funding available for the station construction to go ahead in the immediate future.

In November 2011 the upgrading of the Coventry to Nuneaton route was approved, renewing new hope for regeneration of the line through Kenilworth. In February 2013, Warwickshire County Council made a £5 million funding bid to the new fund the government had created to construct or renovate stations. In June 2013 the Department for Transport approved funding for the new station. Secretary of State for Transport Patrick McLoughlin identified a potential opening date of 2016. In December 2013 the DfT reannounced its grant of £5 million toward the station's £11.3 million total cost, and gave the opening date as December 2016. On 4 October 2014 test runs were made between Leamington and Coventry to check timings along the route.

==== Design and construction ====
The design selected for the new station was a 'traditional' building based on the former station closed in the 1960s. This design was selected in 2014 from three possible options following feedback from the public.

In early summer 2016 Graham Construction Ltd was awarded the contract to build the station. The official start of work on site took place on 29 July 2016 when Jeremy Wright, the local Member of Parliament, ceremonially broke ground. As only a single track now runs through the site, the new station was built with only one platform initially, but has been built with passive provision for a second platform if or when the line through it is re-doubled. Plans for re-doubling the line from Milverton Junction to Kenilworth were put on hold by Network Rail in 2016. In April 2018, it was announced that plans for a second track on the line were back on but would not be completed until 2027 with the arrival of HS2.

==== Opening of new station ====
Although the initial completion date was August 2017, which was due to be delivered on time by the county council, the start-of-service date was moved to 10 December 2017 owing to a delay in track and signalling work by Network Rail. Subsequently, Network Rail completed the necessary track and signalling interventions required to facilitate the station opening by 10 December 2017, but the station build was not complete.

As part of the franchise agreement with West Midlands Trains, effective from December 2017, a new hourly service between Leamington Spa and Coventry would call at Kenilworth. The service was supposed to commence on Sunday 10 December 2017 but was delayed for a third time, to start on 26 February 2018, as the Department for Transport stated that no rolling stock or drivers would be available until that time. However, in February 2018, it was revealed that the station's opening had been delayed for a fourth time and the station would not open until 5 March at the earliest.

On 20 March 2018, correspondence from the Office of Rail and Road was released into the public domain which appeared to show that Warwickshire County Council had failed to submit essential safety information – necessary for final sign-off to be issued – thus delaying the project.

The Office of Rail and Road authorised the opening of Kenilworth on 12 April 2018, although initially with no Sunday service. On 20 April 2018 Warwickshire County Council confirmed an opening date of 30 April 2018. It was reported that the first train would be the 6:44 West Midlands Railway service towards Leamington Spa, but it was subsequently announced that the 6:16 service towards Coventry was due to call before that.

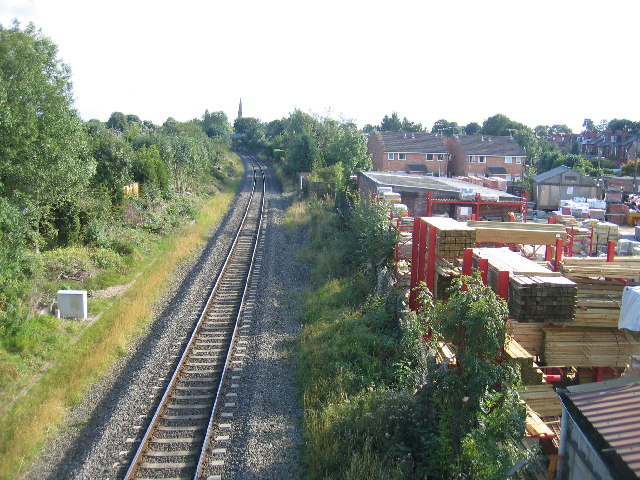
Site of the station in 2005, looking south

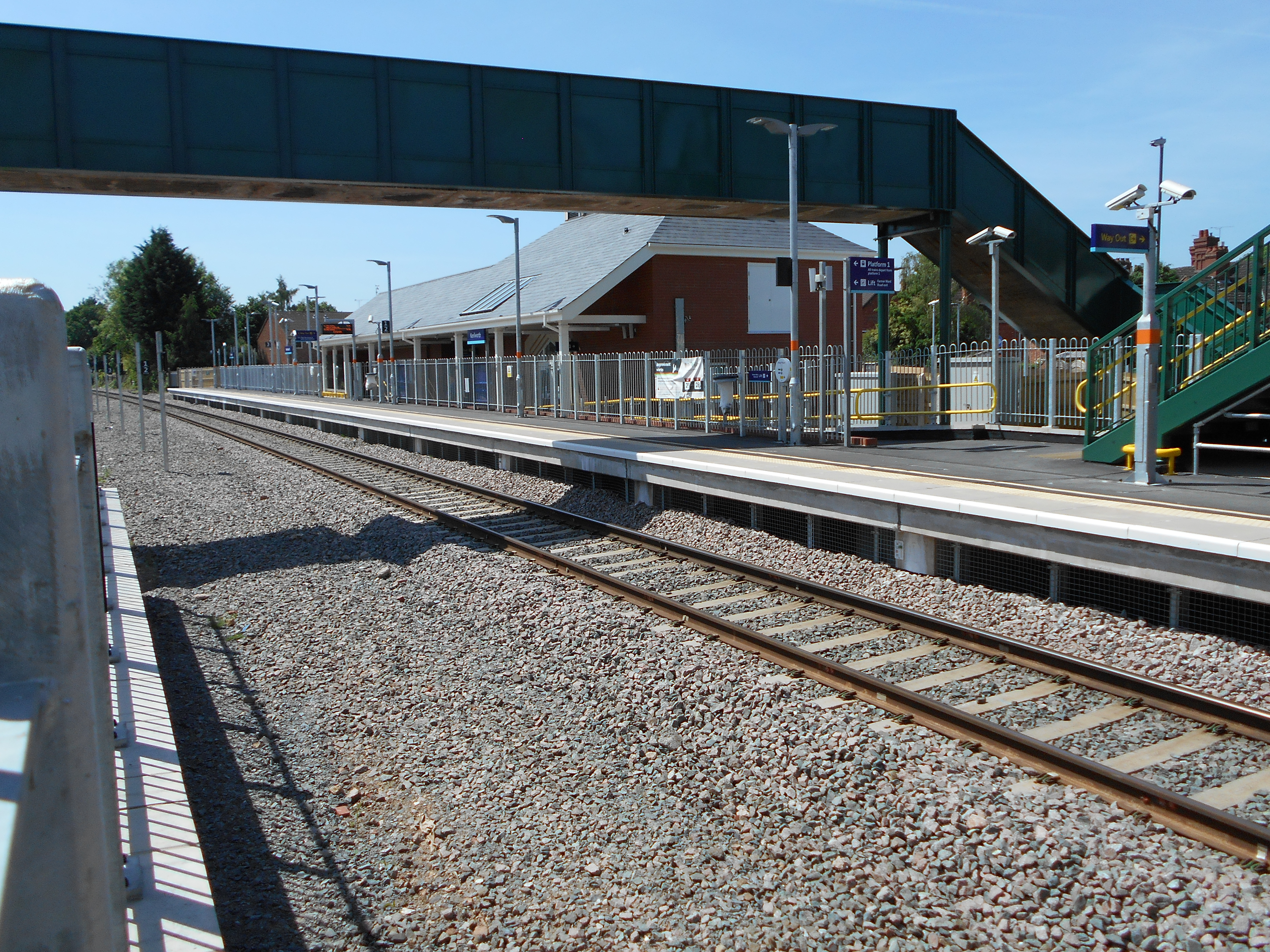
Platform of the new station, looking south

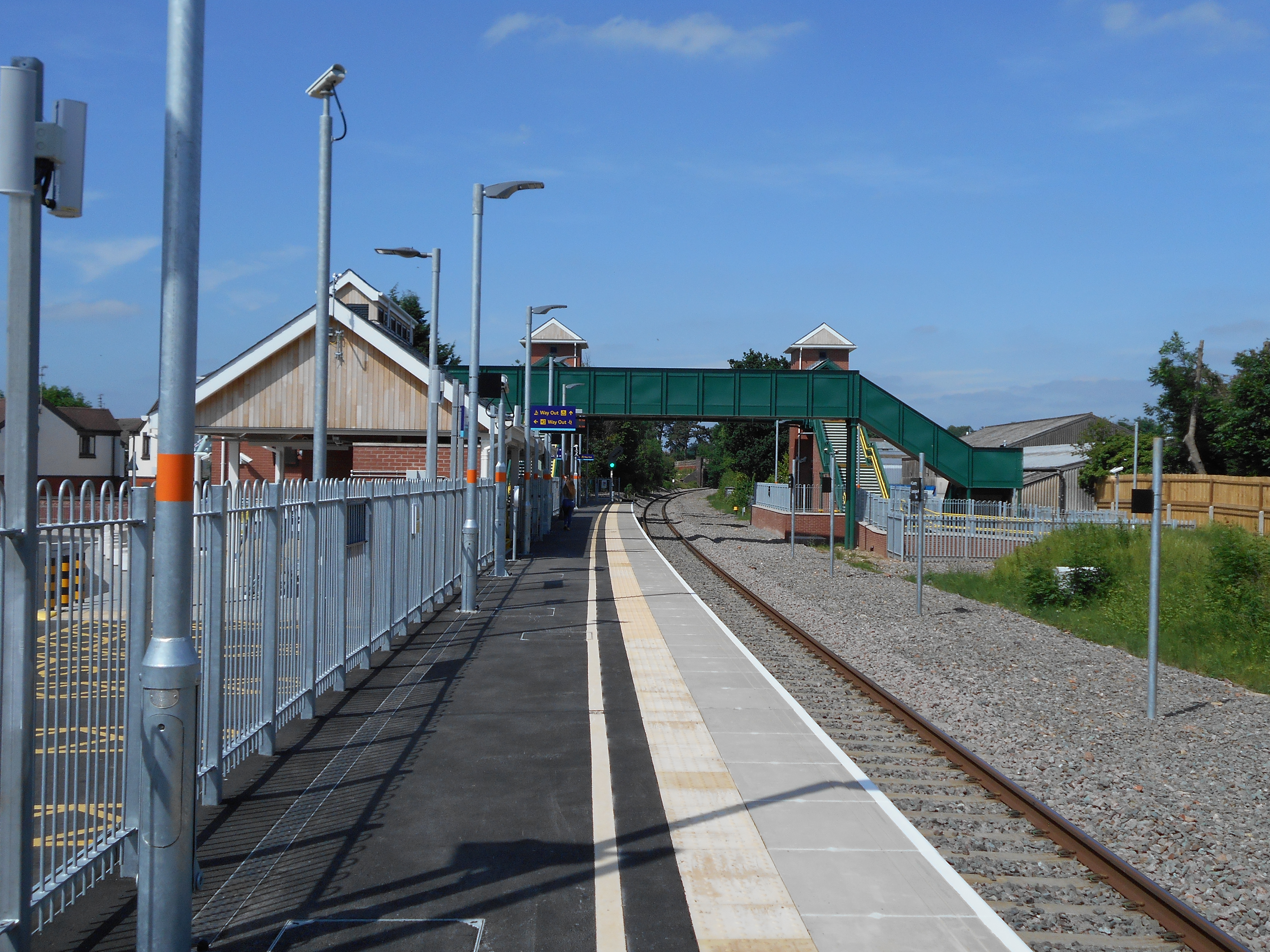
Platform of the new station, looking north

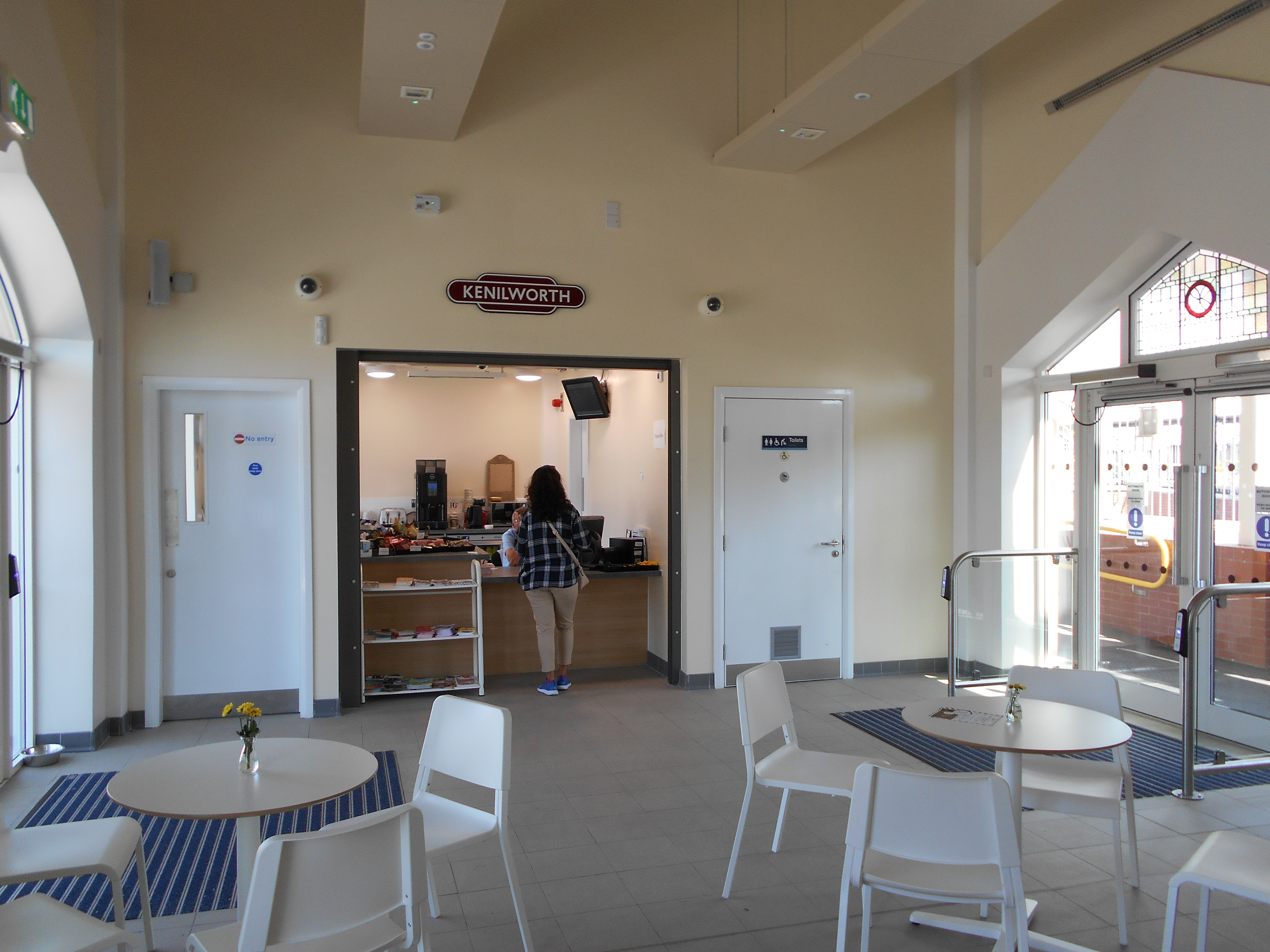
Interior of the station building

== Services ==
An hourly service operated by West Midlands Trains runs southbound to Leamington Spa and northbound to Nuneaton via Coventry. Services originally ran to Coventry only, but since the May 2019 timetable change, northbound services were extended to Nuneaton on Mondays to Saturdays, and a Sunday service which terminates at Coventry was added. The service was initially operated by a single-coach Class 153, but was subsequently operated by a two-coach Class 172 or Class 196. Since 2023 this route has been branded as the Elephant & Bear Line.

| Preceding station | National Rail | Following station |
|---|---|---|
| Coventry | West Midlands Railway; Nuneaton - Leamington - Coventry | Leamington Spa |
| | Historical railways | |
| Coventry; Line and station open | London and North Western Railway; Coventry to Leamington Line | Warwick (Milverton); Line open, station closed |
| Berkswell; Line closed, station open | London and North Western Railway; Berkswell Branch | Warwick (Milverton); Line open, station closed |
