= Birdingbury =

Village in Warwickshire, England

Coordinates: 52.312496°N 1.361839°W

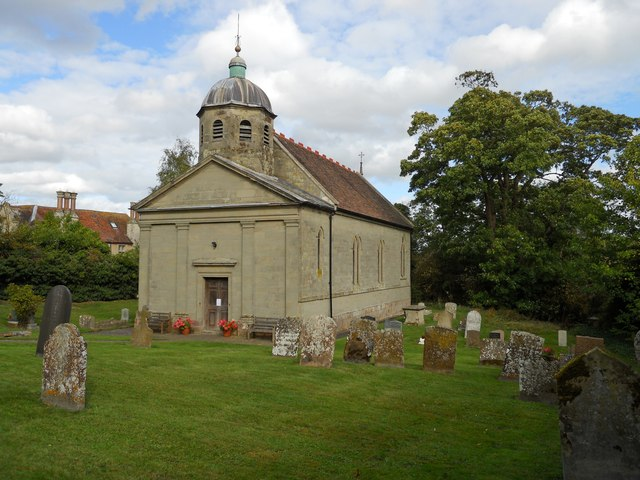
- St Leonard's Church, Birdingbury

- Location within Warwickshire
- Population: 341 (2021)
- OS grid reference: SP4368
- Civil parish: Birdingbury
- District: Rugby
- Shire county: Warwickshire
- Region: West Midlands
- Country: England
- Sovereign state: United Kingdom
- Post town: RUGBY
- Postcode district: CV23
- Dialling code: 01926
- Police: Warwickshire
- Fire: Warwickshire
- Ambulance: West Midlands
- UK Parliament: Kenilworth and Southam

Birdingbury is a village and civil parish in the Rugby district of Warwickshire, England, just south of the River Leam, and not far from Draycote Water. It is located roughly halfway between Rugby and Leamington Spa, about 8 miles (13 km) from each. According to the 2001 census the parish had a population of 327, increasing to 362 at the 2011 Census, decreasing to 341 at the 2021 Census.

== History ==
The village was recorded in the Domesday Book as Derbinggerie. It was given to the Monks of Coventry Priory by Leofric, Earl of Mercia. The village appears as Birbury on the Christopher Saxton map of 1637.

Birdingbury today consists mostly of 20th century developments, but Birdingbury Hall dates back to the early 17th century, and was rebuilt in Jacobean style in the mid to late 19th century following a major fire, it is a grade II listed building. The current St Leonard's Church in the village dates from the late 18th century, but was enlarged in 1873. It is also grade II listed.

Birdingbury once had a railway station, about a mile north of the village centre, it opened in 1851 and closed in 1959, on the former Rugby to Leamington Spa line, which has been partly converted into a cycleway as part of the National Cycle Network.

It was announced in March 2021 that the Lias Line cycle route improvements, passing through Birdingbury as Cycle Route 41, were to commence in Mid 2021, with completion by the Summer of 2022. The development will transition the majority of the route onto traffic-free sections of the former railway line, with the first phase beginning near Rugby.
