= Coventry–Leamington line =

Railway in England

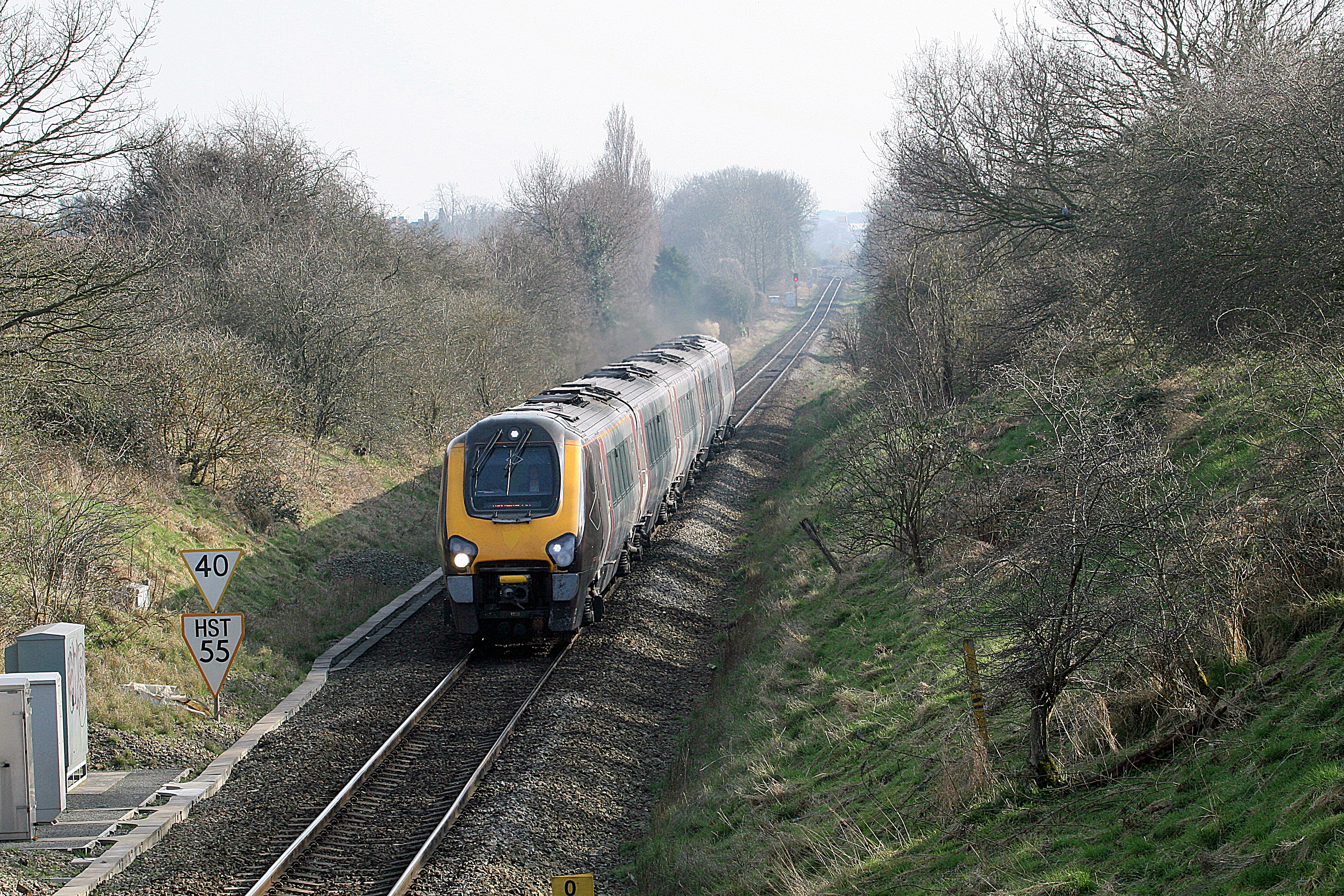
- A CrossCountry Voyager service on the line at Milverton.

Overview
- Status: Operational
- Owner: Network Rail
- Locale: West Midlands (region)
- Termini: Coventry; Leamington Spa

Service
- System: National Rail
- Operator(s): CrossCountry; West Midlands Trains
- Rolling stock: Class 172; Class 196; Class 220; Class 221

History
- Opened: 1851

Technical
- Number of tracks: 1–2
- Track gauge: 4 ft 8 1/2 in (1,435 mm) standard gauge
Route map
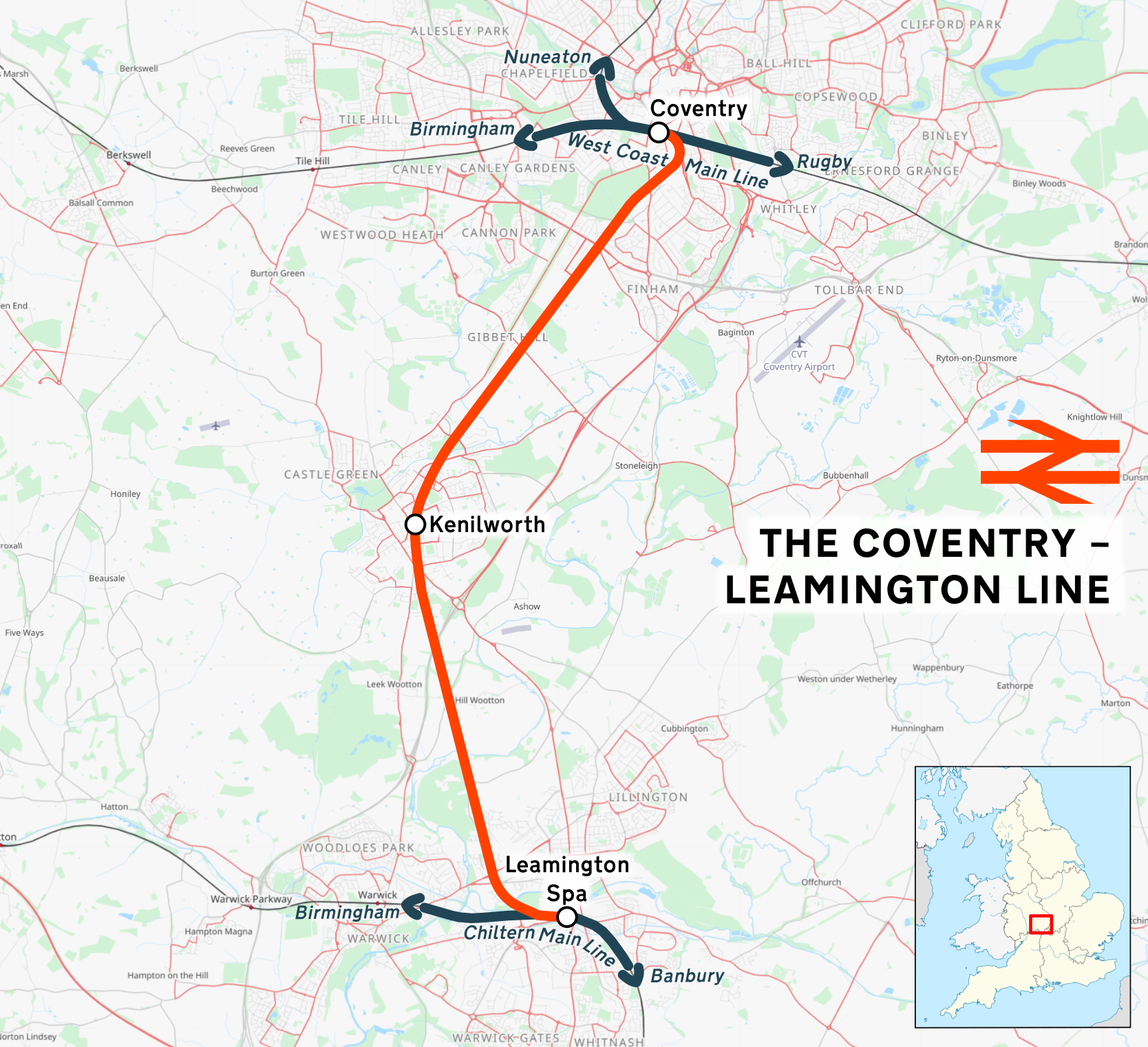
(Click to expand)

The Coventry–Leamington line is a railway line linking the city of Coventry with the town of Leamington Spa. The line was opened in 1844 by the London and Birmingham Railway, as far as Milverton. The line was extended to Leamington Spa Avenue in 1851. A connecting line to Berkswell opened in 1884.

Late in the 19th century, most of the route was doubled to increase capacity. Only a small section just outside Kenilworth, at Gibbet Hill, remained single track. Most of the line was singled in 1972.

== History ==
Warwick and Leamington Union Railway Act 1842
- Act of Parliament
- Parliament of the United Kingdom
- Long title: An Act for making a Branch Railway from the London and Birmingham Railway at Coventry to communicate with the Towns of Warwick and Leamington in the County of Warwick.
- Citation: 5 & 6 Vict. c. lxxxi

Dates
- Royal assent: 18 June 1842

Text of statute as originally enacted

In 1839, an independent company the Warwick and Leamington Union Railway, under the chairmanship of Joseph Frederick Ledsam, submitted plans for a new line connecting Leamington with the London and Birmingham Railway (L&BR) at Coventry; the plans were approved by the Warwick and Leamington Union Railway Act 1842 (5 & 6 Vict. c. lxxxi). The following year, before the line was built, the Warwick and Leamington Union Railway was purchased by the L&BR, which itself became part of the London and North Western Railway (LNWR) three years later.

The line was opened on 9 December 1844 from Coventry via Kenilworth to the original terminus, at what was then known as Leamington station but later became known (after numerous name changes) as Warwick (Milverton) station. The Milverton terminus was inconveniently located a mile from the centre of Leamington, as it had been intended as a compromise to serve both Leamington and Warwick, located midway between the two towns; this was considered unsatisfactory and so, in 1851, the line was extended closer to Leamington town centre and joined end-on to the LNWR's branch line to Rugby. A new, more centrally located station, Leamington Spa (Avenue), was opened on this extension in 1854; this was alongside the rival Great Western Railway (GWR) station at Leamington.

An accident occurred on the line on 11 June 1861, when a bridge collapsed between Leamington and Kenilworth as an empty goods train was passing over it, killing the train driver and fireman.

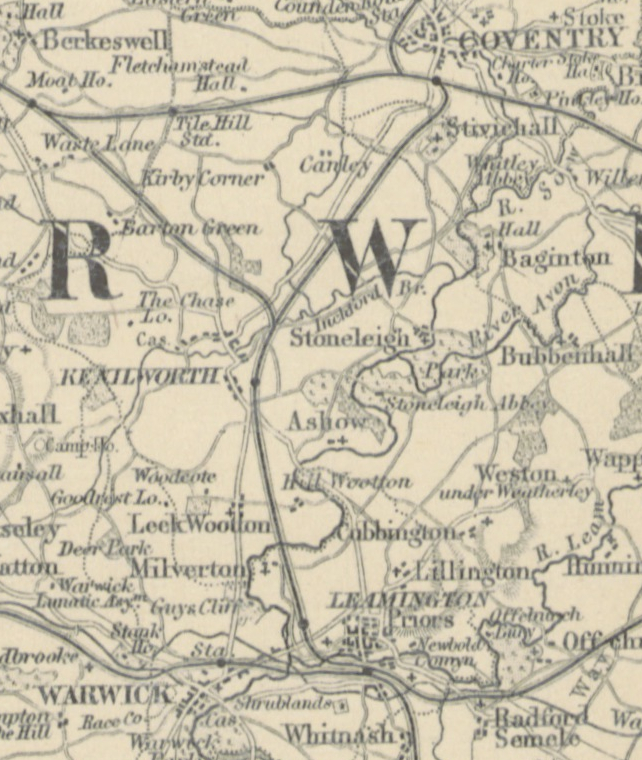
Map of the route from 1890, showing the now closed Berkswell Loop

Originally built as a single track line, the route between Leamington and Kenilworth was widened to double track in 1884 and the stations at Milverton and Kenilworth were rebuilt; however, the section from Kenilworth Junction to Gibbet Hill Junction, just south of Coventry, remained single track. At the same time, a new cut-off line known as the Berkswell Loop was opened from Kenilworth to Berkswell on the Coventry-Birmingham line. This line avoided Coventry and allowed the LNWR to introduce a direct Leamington to Birmingham service.

The line came under the management of the London, Midland and Scottish Railway (LMS) in 1923 and later British Railways in 1948. In the early 1960s, the line, along with the Leamington-Rugby line, was heavily used as a diversionary route while the West Coast Main Line was being electrified. However, the local passenger service was withdrawn on 18 January 1965, as a result of the Beeching Axe, and Kenilworth, Milverton and Avenue stations were closed. With Avenue station closed, a new connection was built the same year connecting the line to the former GWR Leamington station (previously only a siding had connected the former LNWR and GWR lines at Leamington). The Berkswell Loop was closed on 17 January 1969, after a freight train derailed, and the track was lifted the following year. In 1972, British Rail singled much of the line but retained some double track to form a passing loop at Kenilworth.

In May 1977, British Rail resumed passenger services over the line; this was largely due to the opening of Birmingham International station between Birmingham and Coventry in 1976. This caused British Rail to re-route many of their Birmingham to Oxford, Paddington and south-coast trains via Coventry in order to serve the new station; however, none of the intermediate stations were reopened.

In August 2007, Network Rail reinstated 1.5 miles (2.4 km) of double track at the northern end of the line from Park Junction (now removed) to Gibbet Hill Junction in order to increase capacity.

=== Kenilworth station re-opening ===
In 2013, funding was approved to rebuild and reopen Kenilworth railway station. The line was also scheduled to be re-doubled from Milverton Junction to Kenilworth and electrified as part of the Electric Spine project, although these plans were put on hold by Network Rail in 2016 and no date has since been given for completion of this work.

Construction of the new station at Kenilworth began in July 2016. The opening date was originally meant to be August 2017, although this was repeatedly postponed. It finally opened on 30 April 2018. The new hourly service operated by West Midlands Trains was initially a shuttle between Leamington Spa and Coventry, calling at Kenilworth. Since May 2019, this service has been extended to Nuneaton.

In April 2022, the bridge over Rugby Road in Leamington Spa was replaced. The then-current bridge had a 20 mph speed limit due to its poor condition.

== The line today ==
Today, most of the line is single track which limits the number of services using it. What remains of double track includes a passing loop at Kenilworth, along with the lines out from Coventry and Leamington Spa to Gibbet Hill Junction and Milverton respectively.

As of 2025, the line is used by the hourly West Midlands Trains service between Leamington and Nuneaton, which calls at Kenilworth, Coventry and Bedworth, since 2023 this service has been branded as the Elephant & Bear Line. It is also used by the hourly CrossCountry service from Manchester Piccadilly to Bournemouth, which calls at Coventry and Leamington only. It is also regularly used by freight trains; these are mostly container trains, operated by Freightliner from the Port of Southampton to the Midlands or North of England via Coventry and Nuneaton. In 2009, thirty such trains used the line daily.

After the Berkswell connection was lifted, it was redeveloped into a walkway called the Kenilworth Greenway Project. However, part of this route is now closed to the public as it will eventually become part of HS2's Burton Green Tunnel. Once the tunnel is complete, the Greenway will be restored with new paths and planting.

== Proposed development ==
In July 2019 Warwickshire County Council put forward proposals for six new stations in the county; one of these would be a new station on the Coventry–Leamington line, in between Coventry and Kenilworth which would serve south Coventry and the University of Warwick. If the plans go ahead this would happen between 2026 and 2033.

== See also ==
- Coventry to Nuneaton line
- Leamington to Rugby line
- Weedon-Leamington line
- Coat of Arms Bridge
