= Leamington Spa railway station =

Railway station in Warwickshire, England

Coordinates: 52.2846°N 1.5363°W

Leamington Spa
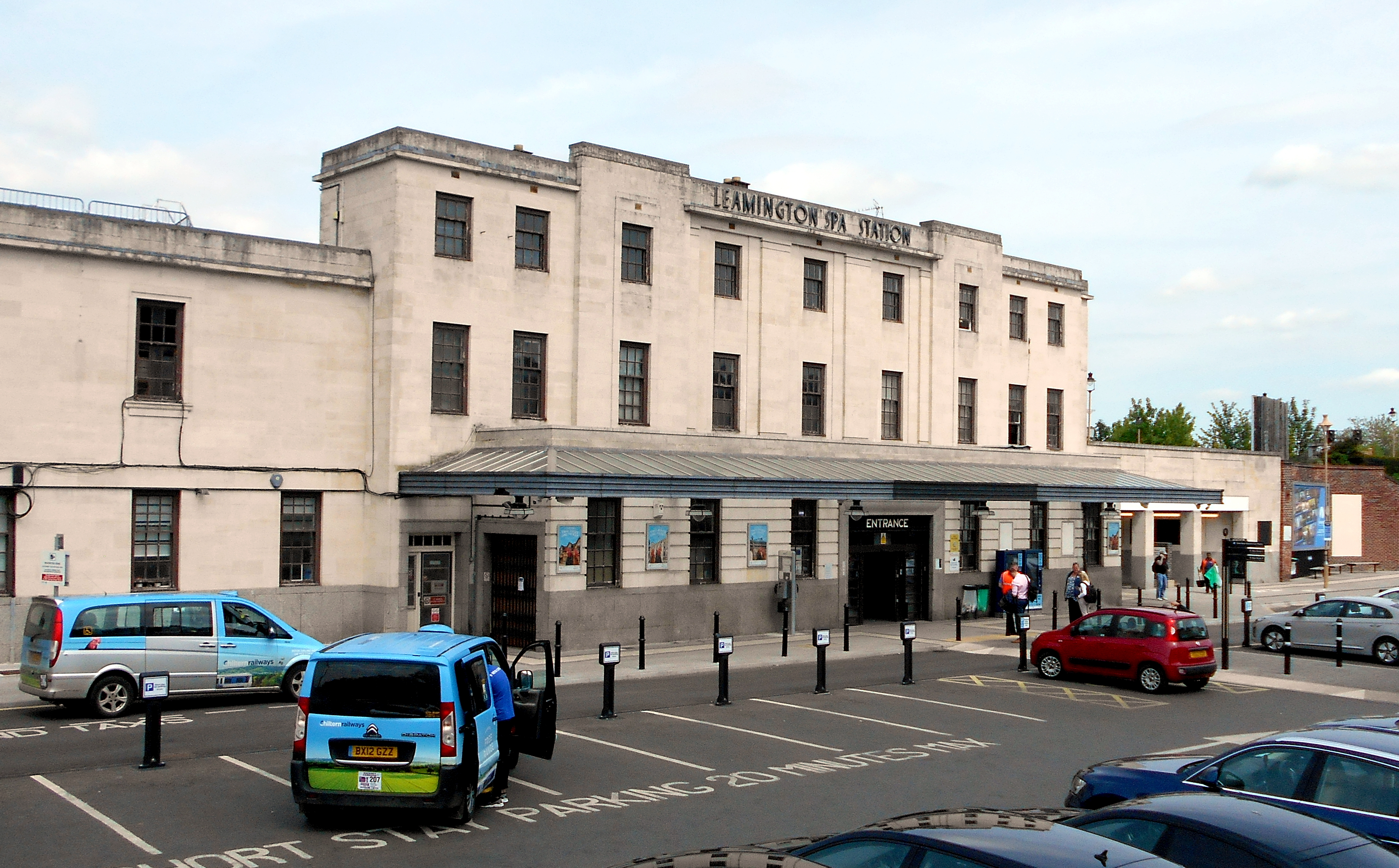
- Leamington Spa station exterior

General information
- Location: Royal Leamington Spa, District of Warwick; England
- Grid reference: SP317652
- Manager: Chiltern Railways
- Platforms: 4

Other information
- Station code: LMS
- Classification: DfT category C1

History
- Original company: Great Western Railway
- Pre-grouping: GWR
- Post-grouping: GWR

Key dates
- 1852: Opened as Leamington
- 1913: Renamed Leamington Spa
- 1937-39: Rebuilt
- 1950: Renamed Leamington Spa General
- 1968: Renamed Leamington Spa

Passengers
- 2021/22: ▲1.656 million
- Interchange: ▲0.128 million
- 2022/23: ▲2.091 million
- Interchange: ▲0.163 million
- 2023/24: ▲2.181 million
- Interchange: ▲0.204 million
- 2024/25: ▲2.545 million
- Interchange: ▲0.229 million
- 2025/26: ▲2.693 million
- Interchange: ▲0.245 million
Location
Notes
- Passenger statistics from the Office of Rail and Road

Leamington Spa railway station serves the town of Leamington Spa, in Warwickshire, England. It is situated on Old Warwick Road, towards the southern edge of the town centre. It is a major stop on the Chiltern Main Line between London and Birmingham, and is the southern terminus of a branch line to Coventry.

== History ==
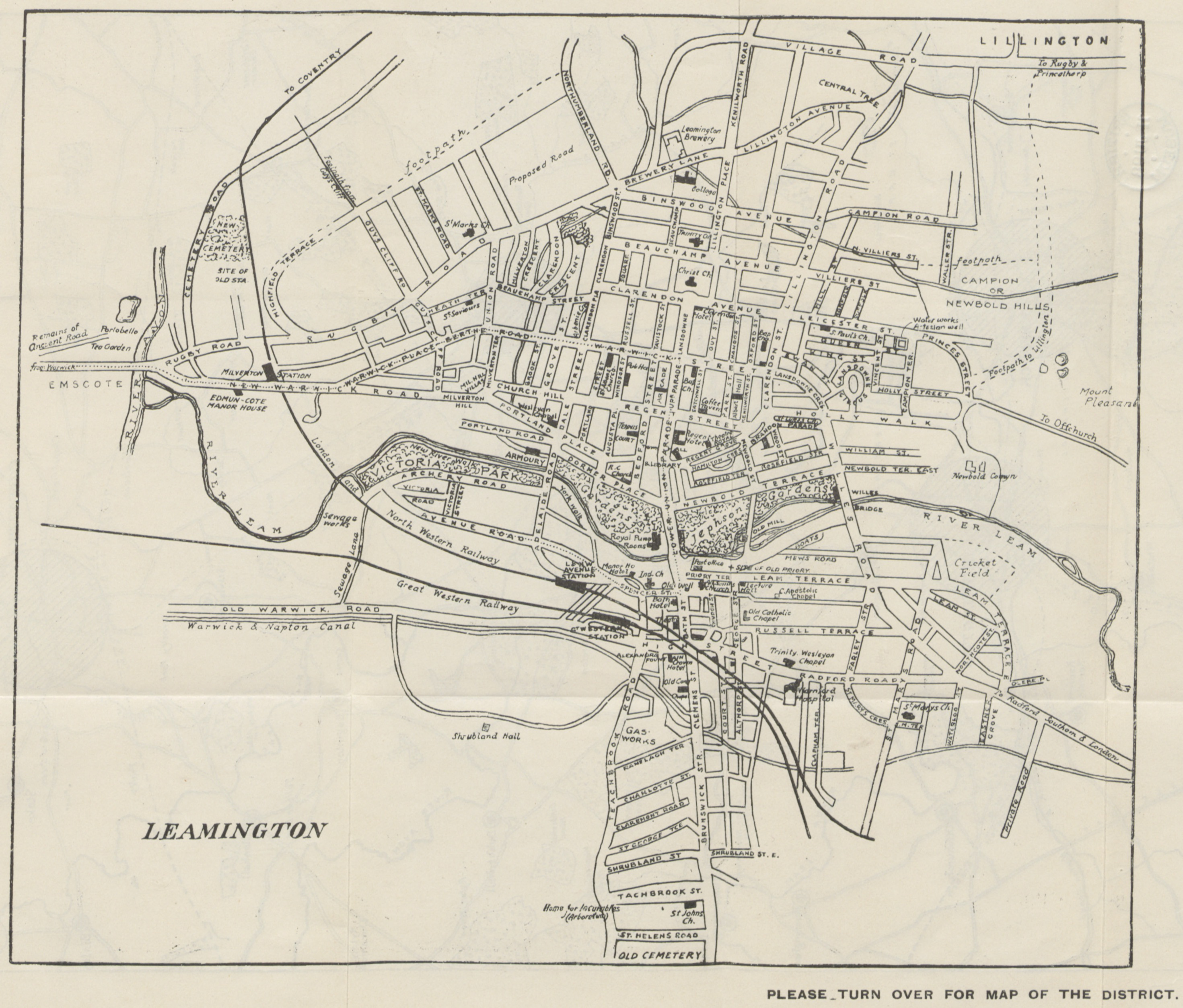
1898 map of Leamington showing the position of Milverton, Avenue and the GWR stations

The first station at the site, under the name Leamington was opened by the Great Western Railway (GWR) on its new main line between Birmingham, Oxford and London in 1852. It was later renamed Leamington Spa in 1913.

This was not the first station in Leamington; the London and North Western Railway (LNWR) had reached the town eight years earlier in 1844, with a branch line from Coventry. That line, however, terminated about 0.7 miles (1.1 km) from the town centre, at Milverton station. The opening of the GWR line compelled the LNWR to extend their Coventry branch into the centre of Leamington, and join it end-on to their new branch to Rugby, and in 1854 they opened a new station directly alongside the GWR station known as Leamington Spa (Avenue). In 1864, a connection was made between the GWR and LNWR lines at Leamington, which was mainly used to exchange goods traffic.

James G. Batterson, the founder of American insurance giant The Travelers Companies, claimed that he first became aware of accident insurance in 1859 when he bought a railway ticket from this station to London which included accidental death insurance up to the amount of £1,000.

In the 1930s, GWR took advantage of a government loan guarantee scheme to fund improvements to their railway network; one of these improvements was the complete rebuilding between 1937 and 1939 of their station at Leamington in the then popular Art Deco style, to the designs of the GWR's chief architect Percy Emerson Culverhouse.

The station came under the control of the Western Region of British Railways in 1948, which renamed the station Leamington Spa (General) in 1950, before reverting to Leamington Spa in 1968. In 1965, British Rail (BR) closed down the adjacent Leamington Spa (Avenue) station and the branch to Rugby; it diverted the Coventry branch into the ex-GWR station via a new connection. Prior to this, there had only been sidings connecting the Coventry line to the ex-GWR line, used for the exchange of goods wagons. BR also removed passenger services from the Coventry branch at the same time, and closed all of the intermediate stations, leaving it open for freight trains only. This lasted until 1977, when BR resumed passenger trains between Leamington and Coventry.

In 1996, Chiltern Railways took over the running of the station and the London to Birmingham services, upon the privatisation of British Rail.

In 2011, the two waiting rooms were restored and refurbished as part of £395,000 improvements that also include 80 new parking spaces at the front of the station and improved disabled access.

The station building and platform structures became grade II listed buildings in 2003.

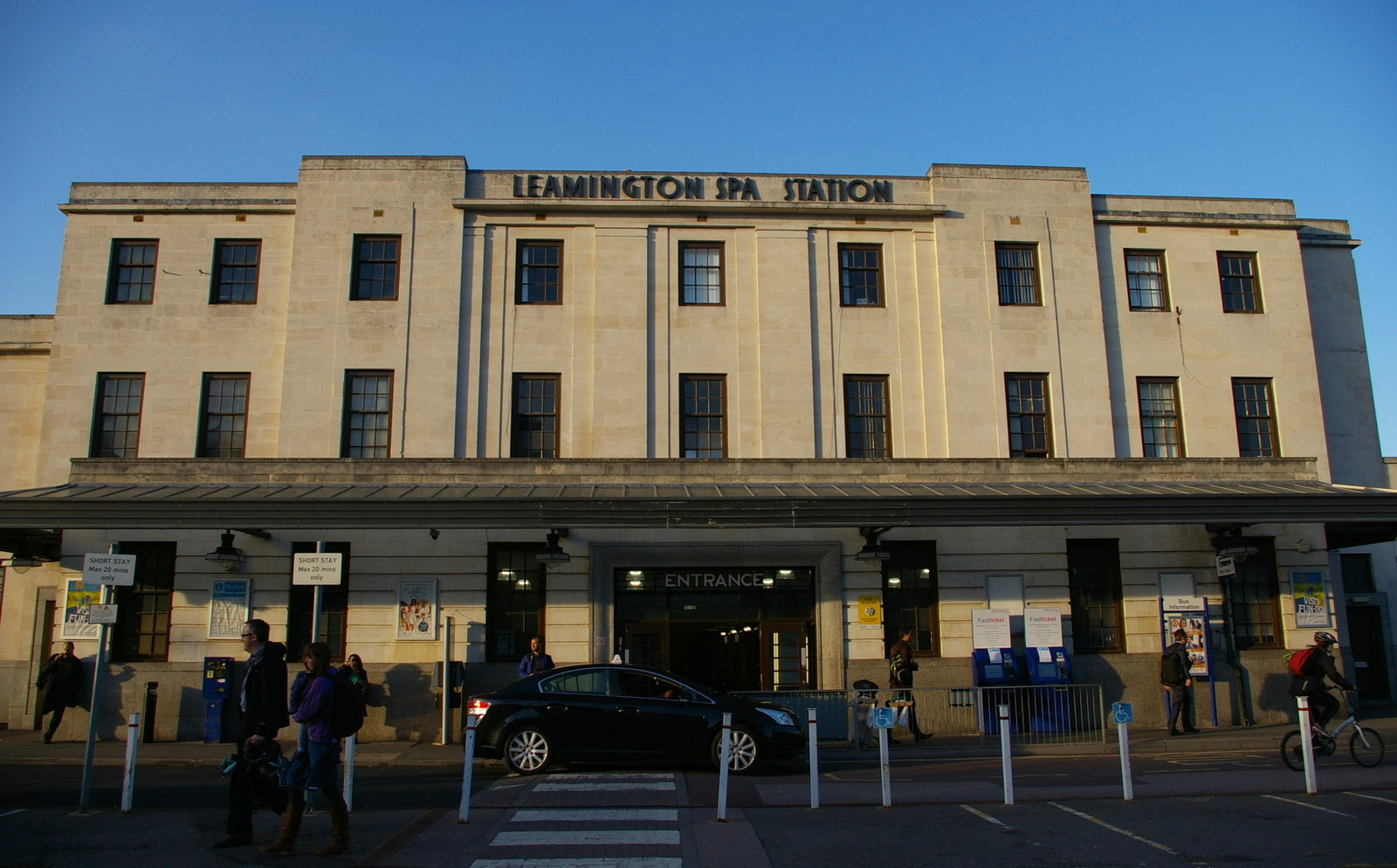
Grade II listed station building

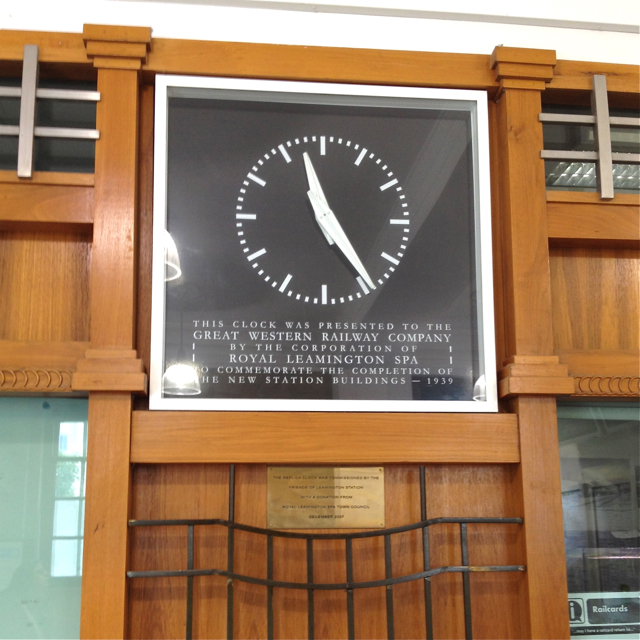
Reproduction Art Deco clock in the station booking hall

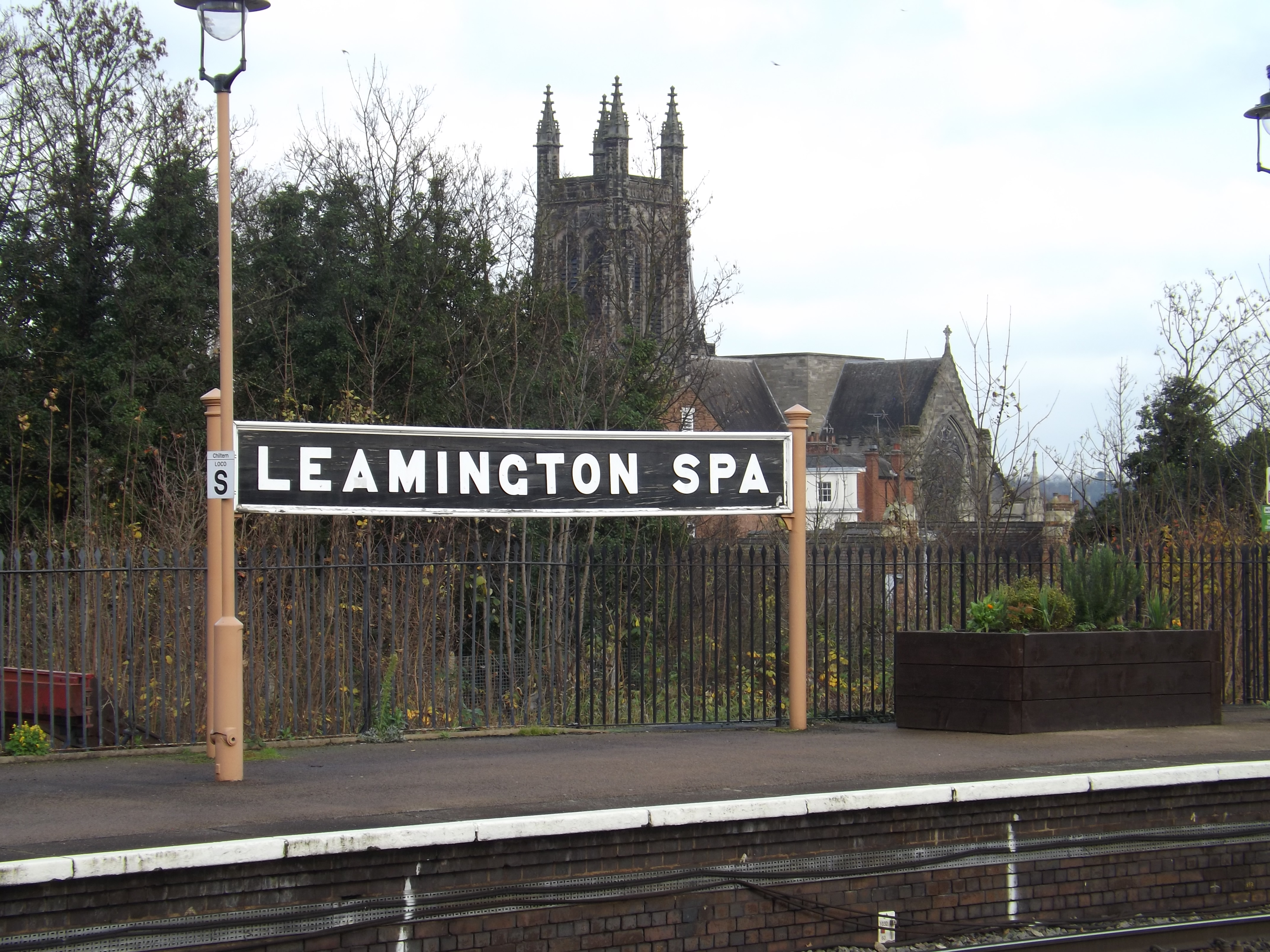
Station sign

== The station today ==
=== Routes ===
Leamington Spa lies on the Chiltern Main Line, which connects London Marylebone and Birmingham (Moor Street and Snow Hill). To the north-west of Leamington Spa are Warwick and Solihull, with a branch to Stratford-upon-Avon diverging at Hatton, 6 miles (9.7 km) from Leamington. To the south-east of Leamington Spa is Banbury, at which trains also branch to the Cherwell Valley Line for service to Oxford, Reading, and points south.

Leamington Spa is also the southern end of the Coventry–Leamington line, along which trains proceed north to Kenilworth and Coventry. At Coventry passengers can change for West Coast Main Line service south towards London Euston or north towards Birmingham New Street.

=== Layout ===
Leamington station layout, showing the main building and platforms

The present Art Deco-style station, which dates from immediately prior to the Second World War having been rebuilt comprehensively between 1937 and 1939, has four platforms which are numbered one to four from south to north:

- Platforms one and four are west-facing bays, used only by local trains to and from Birmingham Snow Hill, Stratford-upon-Avon or Nuneaton starting or terminating at Leamington
- Platforms two and three are through platforms: platform two is used by services to Stratford-upon-Avon, Birmingham Snow Hill or Coventry, Birmingham New Street and beyond; platform three is for departures to Banbury and London Marylebone or Reading. Two central lines allow freight trains or other non-stop services to pass through the station when platforms two and three are occupied.

== Services ==
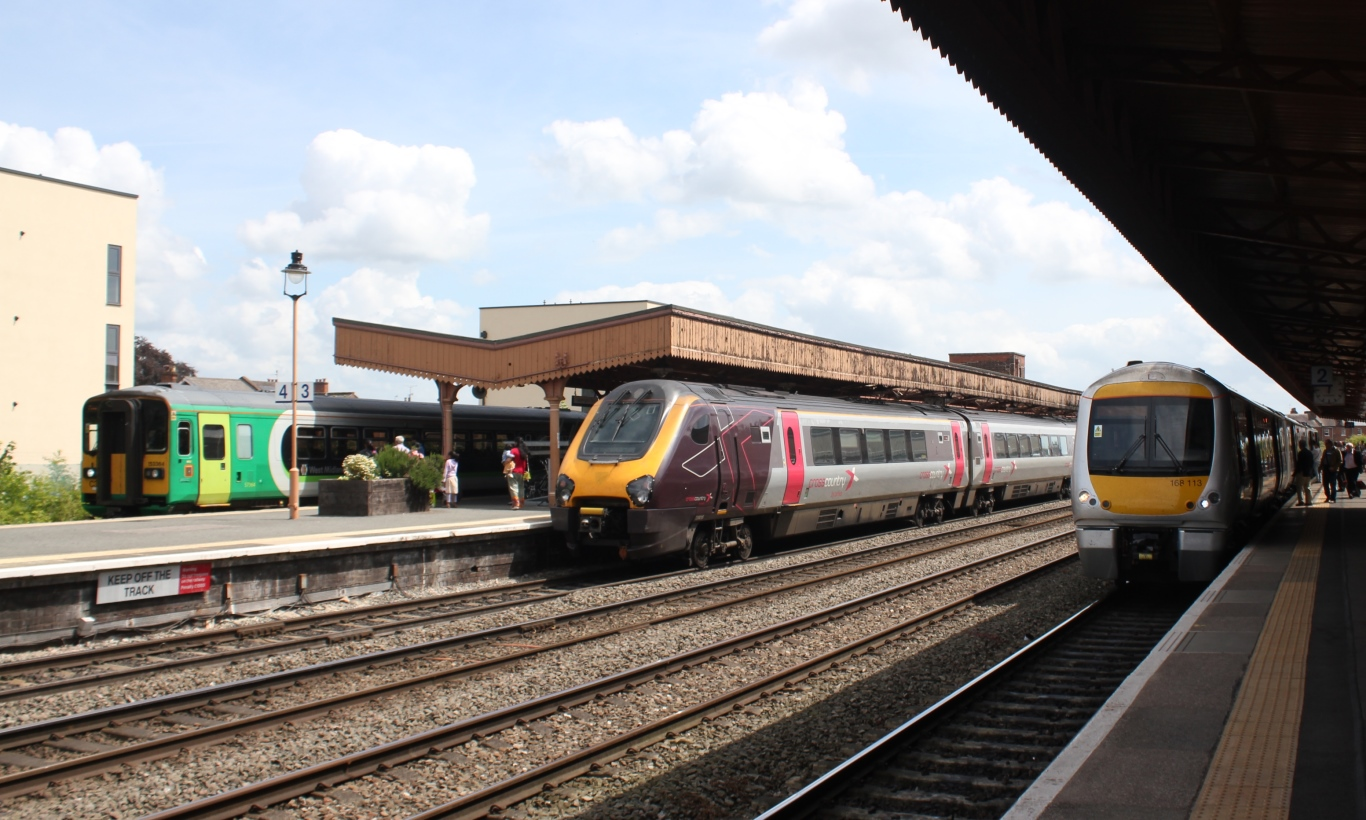
A West Midlands Trains service to Coventry (On the left), a CrossCountry service to Reading (Middle) and a Chiltern Railways service to Birmingham (On the right).

The station is served by three train operating companies:

=== Chiltern Railways ===
Chiltern Railways services run every half hour between London Marylebone and Birmingham Moor Street (limited stop, alternate trains continue through to Birmingham Snow Hill, with 3 evening trains extending to Stourbridge Junction); further trains, at approximately two-hourly intervals, travel from here to Stratford-upon-Avon and to Moor Street (stopping service). Until the May 2023 timetable change, a number of the Birmingham trains started from Kidderminster in the mornings and terminated there in the evenings, whilst a limited through service ran between Marylebone and Stratford-upon-Avon.

On Sundays, the frequency of trains is about half of that indicated above northbound to Moor Street and southbound to Marylebone, with hourly services between the two. An additional two services to Stourbridge via Birmingham Snow Hill run in the evening peak. The service starting from here to Stratford-upon-Avon remains two-hourly.

=== CrossCountry ===
One long-distance train per hour stops in each direction. Northbound services go to Manchester Piccadilly, via Coventry, Birmingham International, Birmingham New Street, Wolverhampton, Stafford and Stoke-on-Trent; southbound to Bournemouth, via Banbury, Oxford, Reading, Basingstoke and Southampton Central.

=== West Midlands Railway ===
West Midlands Railway operate an hourly local service to Nuneaton via Kenilworth, Coventry and Bedworth. Since 2023 this route has been branded as the Elephant & Bear Line.

WMR also operates an early morning service on Mondays to Saturdays to Worcester Foregate Street, via Birmingham Snow Hill, Birmingham Moor Street, Stourbridge Junction, Kidderminster and Worcester Shrub Hill at the beginning of the day and from there in the evening. An additional limited stop service terminates at Snow Hill on Saturday mornings only.

| Preceding station | National Rail | Following station |
|---|---|---|
| Warwick | Chiltern Railways; London to Birmingham | Banbury |
| Warwick | Chiltern Railways; Leamington Spa–Stratford | Terminus |
| Coventry | CrossCountry; Manchester–Bournemouth | Banbury |
| Birmingham; New Street | CrossCountry; Leeds/Newcastle–Southampton Central/Reading | Banbury |
| Warwick; Limited Service | West Midlands Railway; Leamington Spa to Worcester | Terminus |
| Kenilworth | West Midlands Railway; Nuneaton – Coventry – Leamington | Terminus |

== Former motive power depots ==
The London and Birmingham Railway opened a motive power depot on the west side of the line at their Milverton station in 1844. It was replaced by a larger engine shed nearby in 1881, which was known as Warwick (Milverton). This depot closed on 17 November 1958 and was demolished. Locomotives were then serviced at the former Great Western Railway depot at Leamington Spa.

The Great Western Railway opened a motive power depot on the east side of the line south of Leamington Spa General Station in 1906. This was closed by British Railways on 14 June 1965 and was demolished.
