= Marton, Warwickshire =

Village and civil parish in Warwickshire, England

Coordinates: 52.316°N 1.404°W

Marton
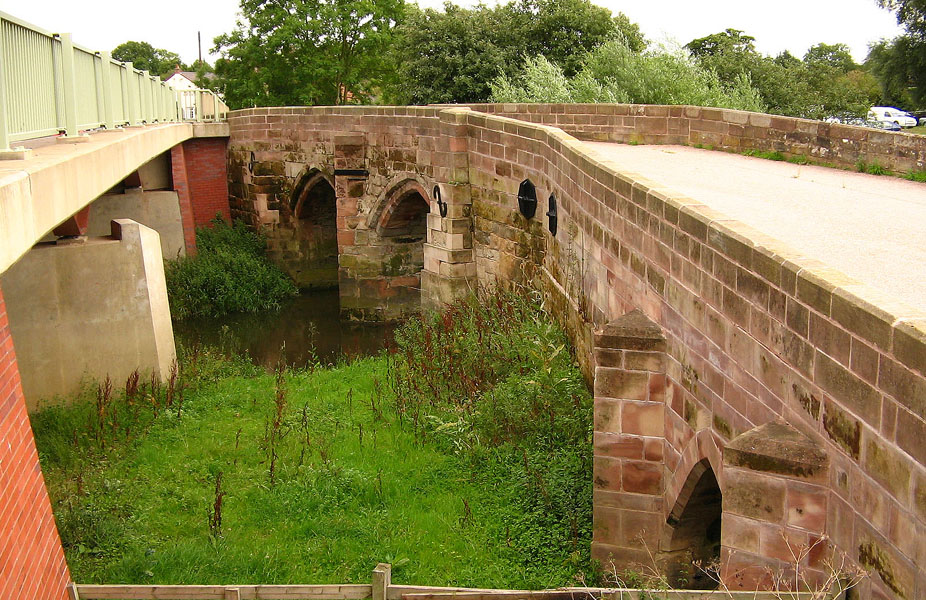
- Marton Bridge

- Location within Warwickshire
- Population: 484 (2001 & 2011)
- OS grid reference: SP407688
- Civil parish: Marton
- District: Rugby
- Shire county: Warwickshire
- Region: West Midlands
- Country: England
- Sovereign state: United Kingdom
- Post town: RUGBY
- Postcode district: CV23
- Dialling code: 01926
- Police: Warwickshire
- Fire: Warwickshire
- Ambulance: West Midlands
- UK Parliament: Kenilworth and Southam

Marton is a village and civil parish in Warwickshire, England.

== Village ==
The parish is within the Borough of Rugby and in the 2011 Census had a population of 484. The hamlet of Marton Moor lies south of the village.

Marton is on the A423 road between Coventry and Southam. To the north of the village is the River Leam and just to the west the River Itchen joins the Leam. Due to its proximity from these two rivers, parts of the village have periodically suffered from flooding.

Marton was mentioned in the Domesday Book as Mortone. In the early Middle Ages it was a place of some importance, as it was the centre of a hundred named Meretone. By the late 12th century this had become part of the hundred of Knightlow.

Just north of Marton is a medieval bridge over the River Leam known as Marton Bridge, which was built in 1414 by a locally born merchant called John Middleton. In 1928 a modern bridge was effectively built over the top of the medieval one, and it was hidden from view. However, in 2000 a new bridge was built alongside and the old bridge was uncovered and restored. The old bridge now carries pedestrians, while the modern bridge carries road traffic. Another point of interest in Marton is the Marton Museum of Country Bygones which has a collection of old agricultural implements. The village church of St Esprit is Grade II* listed.

Marton used to have a a railway station on the former Rugby to Leamington Spa line, which was about half a mile south of the village, but this closed in 1959. There was also a junction called Marton Junction further south from the village, where the Rugby to Leamington Spa railway joined the Leamington to Weedon route.
