= Cawston, Warwickshire =

Civil parish and village in England

Coordinates: 52°21′18″N 1°18′24″W

Cawston is a civil parish and suburban village close to the south west of Rugby, on the A4071 (which is in turn just one mile from the M45). The population of the civil parish at the 2021 census was 5,192. For hundreds of years the village was basically a hamlet and the two settlements remained separate despite Rugby's continued growth. However, in 2003–04 a new housing development, Cawston Grange, was completed all but connecting the two settlements. Cawston Grange Primary School was built at the same time to educate children in the area aged 4–11 and there is a nursery for pre-school children as well as shops.

One of the most significant older buildings in the village is Cawston House. It was built in 1545 by Edward Boughton. The house has been in the hands of several notable titled families and was also used as a convalescent home for troops from Belgium in World War I, a girls' school between 1938 and 1958, and a research and development unit for an engineering company. The house was greatly altered in 1907 and remains the same externally to this day. In 2004 the house was bought by a developer and sub-divided to make a retirement village.

The old Rugby to Leamington railway line ran through the old village (this closure predates the Beeching cuts, but part was still used as a freight line to Rugby Cement works at Long Itchington) and its path can still be walked along. The railway bridge over the A4071 has in recent years gained minor fame for the 'witty' slogans written on it. Examples of such (referring to a different village near Rugby) are "Home rule for Crick" and "Fly Crick air". In August 2007 construction of the Rugby Western Relief Road started just west of the village, a project which was completed in 2010.
