= Rugby Cement =

- Industry: Cement
- Founded: 1862 as Rugby Lias Lime & Cement Company Ltd
- Defunct: 2000
- Fate: Taken over by RMC Group
- Headquarters: Rugby, Warwickshire

Rugby Cement was the common name for a company based principally in Rugby, Warwickshire, which produced portland cement. With its origins in the early 19th century, the company was founded in 1862 as the Rugby Lias Lime & Cement Company Ltd before being renamed the Rugby Portland Cement Company Ltd in 1872, in 1979 it was renamed the Rugby Group plc. In 2000 Rugby Cement was taken over by the RMC Group, which was itself taken over by the Mexican firm Cemex in 2005. Cement production still continues at the New Bilton site in Rugby under Cemex ownership.

== History ==
The business was first started in 1825 as a small family business by two local businessmen Thomas Walker and his son George Walker when they started producing lime mortar at a site on their land at New Bilton and nearby Newbold-on-Avon, exploiting locally available deposits of what Professor H.B. Woodward described in 1898 as "the finest inland section of lower lias limestone in the country".

The first public company the Rugby Lias Lime & Cement Company Ltd was founded in 1862. In around 1870 the company began producing portland cement, and the company was renamed the Rugby Portland Cement Company Ltd. in 1872.

The next milestone in the company's history occurred in 1933 when Sir Halford Reddish became the managing director of the company. The company began to expand its activities, acquiring four plants at nearby Southam in 1934, Rochester in 1937, Gillingham in 1939, and Stockton in 1945. The first two were rebuilt and modernised with the latest technology, but the latter two were soon closed down as they competed with the Southam and Rochester plants.

In 1955, the company founded an Australian subsidiary, Cockburn Cement Ltd, in Perth, Australia, which was later merged in 1999 into Adelaide Brighton Cement.

In 1965 a 92 km pipeline was opened to transport chalk as slurry from Kensworth Chalk Pit, Bedfordshire to the Rugby plant.

By the 1980s the company branched out from its Portland cement base to offer a wider variety of cement types, including sulfate-resistant cements, cements for the offshore oil industry, and quick-drying cements.

In 1984 the company bought the Addison Corporation of Atlanta, Georgia, thus entering the American construction market, and also saw it enter the joinery market.

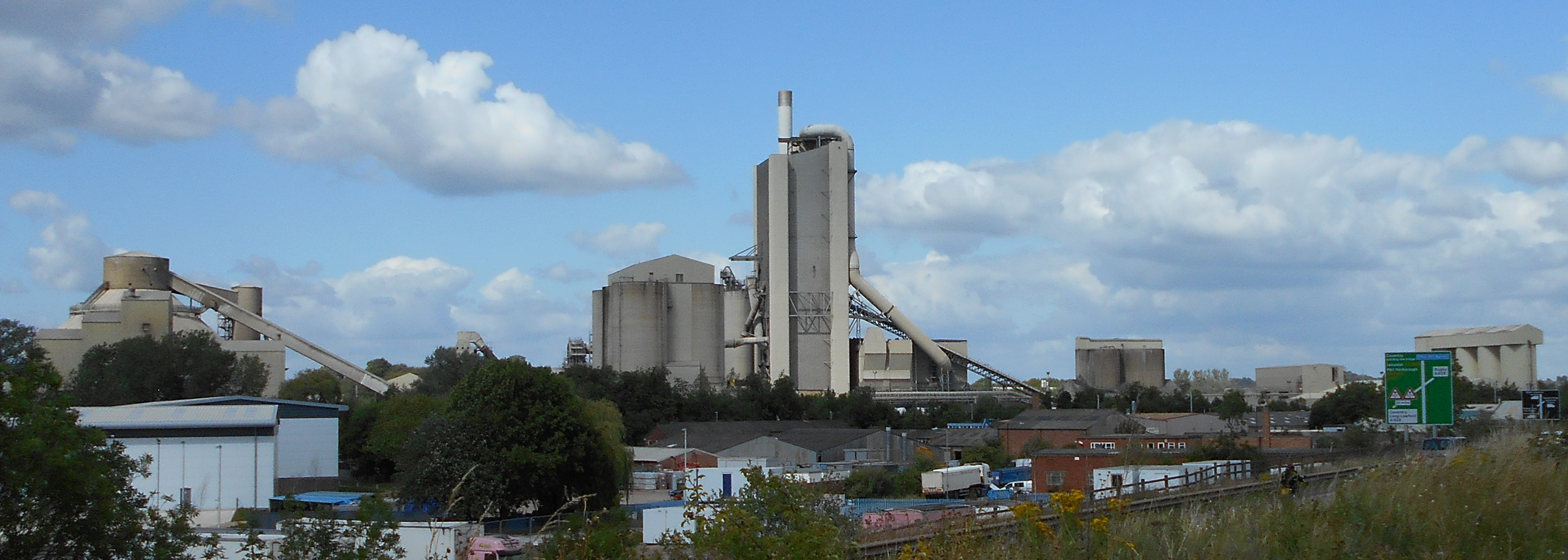
The cement works at Rugby

In the late 1990s, the plant at Rugby was upgraded at a cost of £200 million to a production capacity of 1.8 million tonnes. At the same time the plants at Southam and Rochester were closed down as production was concentrated at Rugby.

== See also ==
- Blue Lias – locally available limestone
