= Marton railway station (Warwickshire) =

Disused railway station in Warwickshire, England

Marton
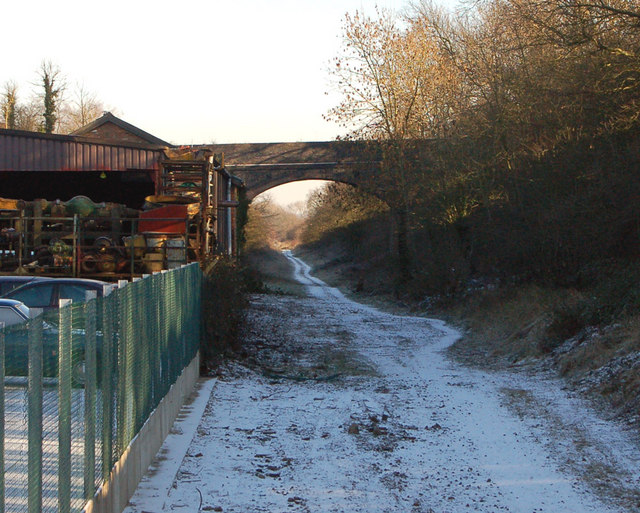
- Site of the former station at Marton, Warwickshire, in January 2010

General information
- Location: Marton, Rugby; England
- Coordinates: 52.30893°N 1.39572°W
- Grid reference: SP412680
- Platforms: 2

Other information
- Status: Disused

History
- Original company: LNWR
- Post-grouping: London, Midland and Scottish Railway

Key dates
- 1 March 1851: Station opens
- 1 July 1853: Name changed to Marton for Southam
- October 1860: Name changed back to Marton
- 15 June 1959: Station closes for passengers
- 3 July 1961: Station closes for freight
Location

Marton railway station was a railway station serving Marton in the English county of Warwickshire on the Rugby to Leamington line.

Among the many schemes to build a line between Rugby and Leamington was one by the Rugby, Leamington and Warwick Railway Company. This later became known as the Rugby and Leamington Railway and received royal assent on 13 August 1846. The undertaking was sold to the London and North Western Railway on 17 November 1846 and the line opened on 1 March 1851.

Marton station was situated half-a-mile south of the village it served on the road to Long Itchington (now the A423). The brick-built station buildings were on the Down (Leamington-bound) side of the line.

Marton station closed to passenger traffic on 15 June 1959 and closed to freight in July 1961.

The rail bridge over the A423 was demolished in August 2022, removing the access to the former station permanently.

| Preceding station | Disused railways | Following station |
|---|---|---|
| Birdingbury | London and North Western Railway; Leamington to Rugby line | Leamington Spa |
