= West Coast Main Line =

Principal railway route in Great Britain

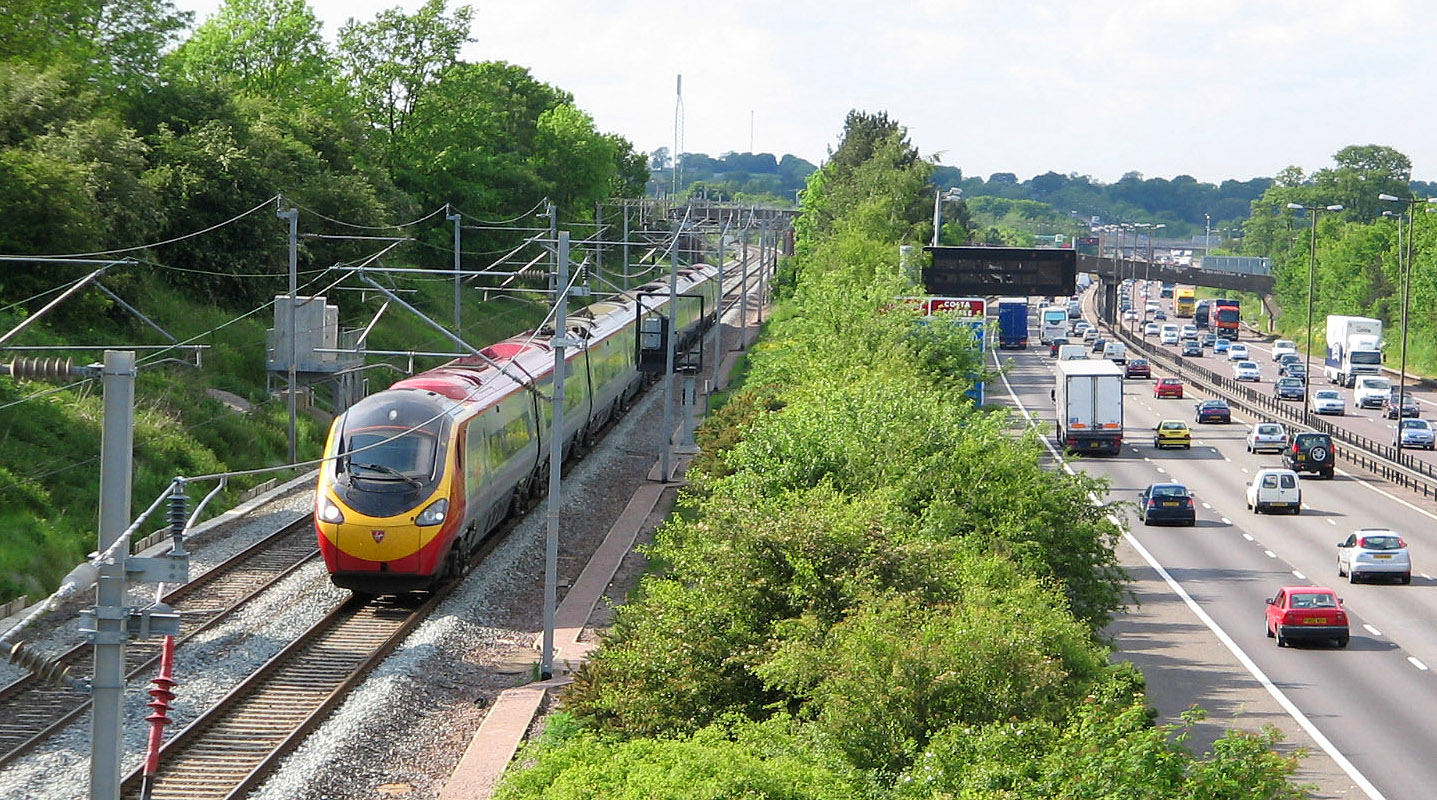
- The West Coast Main Line running alongside the M1 motorway at Watford Gap

Overview
- Status: Operational
- Owner: Network Rail
- Locale: Greater London; East of England; South East England; East Midlands; West Midlands; North West England; Scotland
- Termini: Glasgow Central; London Euston
- Stations: 46

Service
- Type: Inter-city rail; high-speed rail; rail freight
- System: National Rail
- Operators: Passenger: Avanti West Coast; Caledonian Sleeper; CrossCountry; Lumo; Northern Trains; ScotRail; TransPennine Express; Transport for Wales; West Midlands Trains; Freight: DB Cargo UK; Direct Rail Services; Freightliner; GB Railfreight

History
- Opened: 1837–1881

Technical
- Line length: 399 mi (642 km)
- Num of tracks: Two, four or six
- Track gauge: 4 ft 8 1/2 in (1,435 mm) standard gauge
- Loading gauge: W10
- Electrification: Overhead line, 25 kV 50 Hz AC
- Operating speed: 110 or 125 mph (177 or 201 km/h) (Note: 125 mph (200 km/h) for Class 390 Pendolino tilting trains only.)
Route map
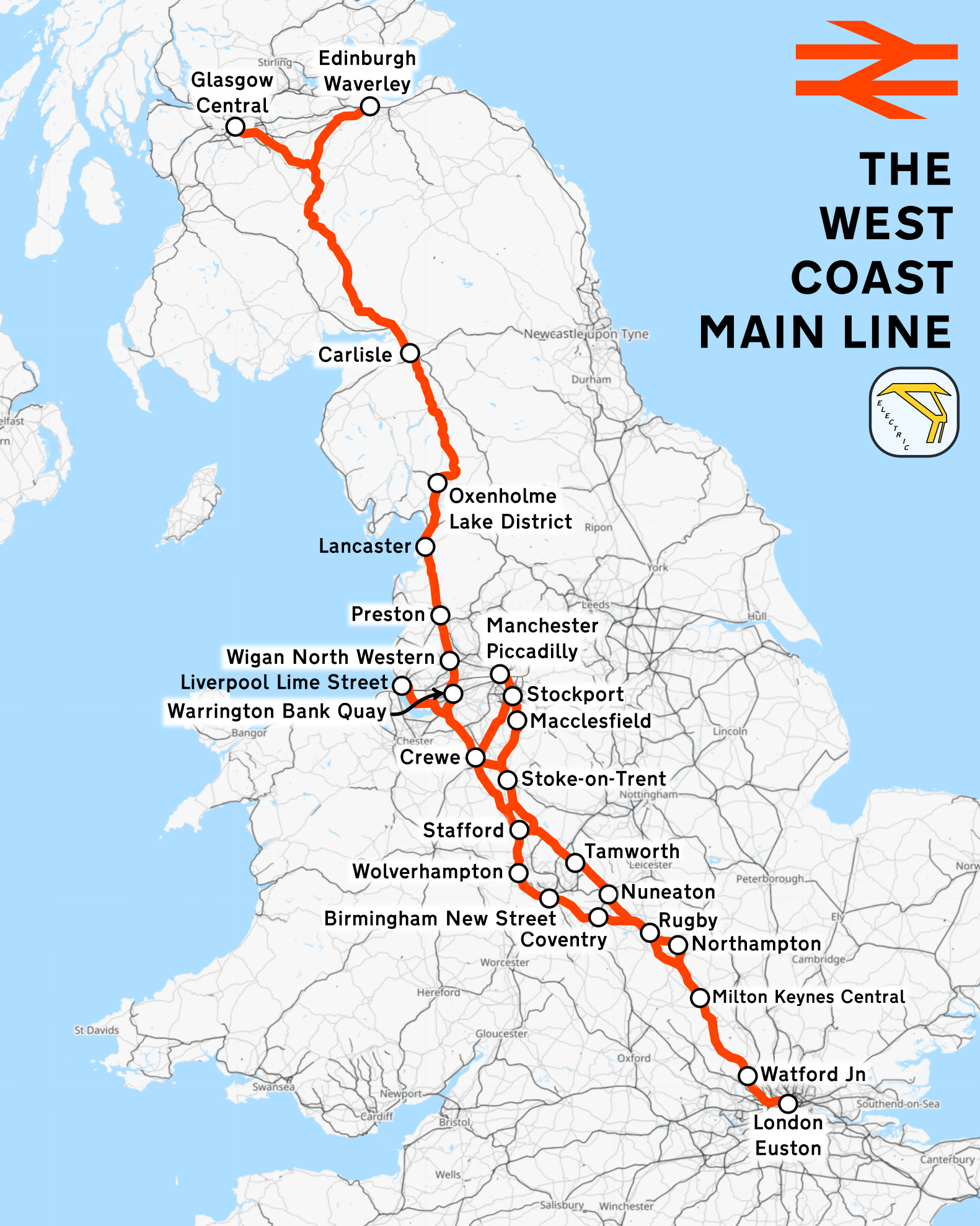
(Click to expand)
- All routes shown. A detailed diagram of the core route can be found at West Coast Main Line diagram.

The West Coast Main Line (WCML) is a significant railway corridor in Great Britain, connecting the major cities of London and Glasgow with branches to Birmingham, Manchester, Liverpool and Edinburgh. It is one of the busiest mixed-traffic railway routes in Europe, carrying a mixture of inter-city rail, regional rail, commuter rail and rail freight traffic. The core route of the WCML runs from London to Glasgow for 399 miles (642 km) and was opened between 1837 and 1881; this totals a route mileage of 700 miles (1,127 km) by including its many branches. The Glasgow–Edinburgh via Carstairs line connects the WCML to Edinburgh Waverley; however, the main London–Edinburgh route is the East Coast Main Line (ECML) via York. Several sections of the WCML form part of the suburban railway systems in London, Coventry, Birmingham, Manchester, Liverpool and Glasgow, with many more smaller commuter stations, as well as providing links to more rural towns.

It is one of the busiest rail freight routes in Europe, carrying 40% of all UK traffic.; it is the principal corridor linking the European mainland (via the Channel Tunnel) through London and South East England to the West Midlands, North West England and Scotland. The line has been declared a strategic European route and designated a priority Trans-European Networks (TENS) route. A number of railway writers refer to it as "The Premier line".

The WCML was not originally conceived as a single route, but was built as a patchwork of local lines by several companies which were linked together. The largest of these amalgamated in 1846 to create the London and North Western Railway (LNWR), which then gradually absorbed most of the others; the exceptions were the Caledonian Railway in Scotland and the North Staffordshire Railway (NSR), which both remained independent until 1923. The core route was built mostly between the 1830s and 1850s, but several cut-off routes and branches were built in later decades. In 1923, the entire route came under the ownership of the London, Midland and Scottish Railway (LMS), when the railway companies were grouped under the Railways Act 1921. The LMS itself was nationalised in 1947 to form part of British Railways (BR).

As the WCML is the most important long-distance railway trunk route in Britain, BR carried out an extensive programme of modernisation of it between the late 1950s and early 1970s, which included full overhead electrification of the route and the introduction of modern inter-city passenger services at speeds of up to 110 mph (177 km/h). Further abortive modernisation schemes were proposed, including the introduction of the Advanced Passenger Train (APT) in the 1980s; this was an ill-fated high speed train which used tilting technology, which was required to allow faster speeds on the curving route, and the abortive InterCity 250 project in the early 1990s. Further modernisation of the route occurred during the 2000s in the period of privatisation, which saw speeds raised further to 125 mph (201 km/h) and the introduction of tilting Class 390 Pendolino trains.

As much of the line has a maximum speed of 125 mph (201 km/h), it meets the European Union's definition of an upgraded high-speed line, although only Class 390 Pendolinos with tilting mechanisms operated by Avanti West Coast travel at that speed. Non-tilting trains are limited to 110 mph (177 km/h).

== Geography ==
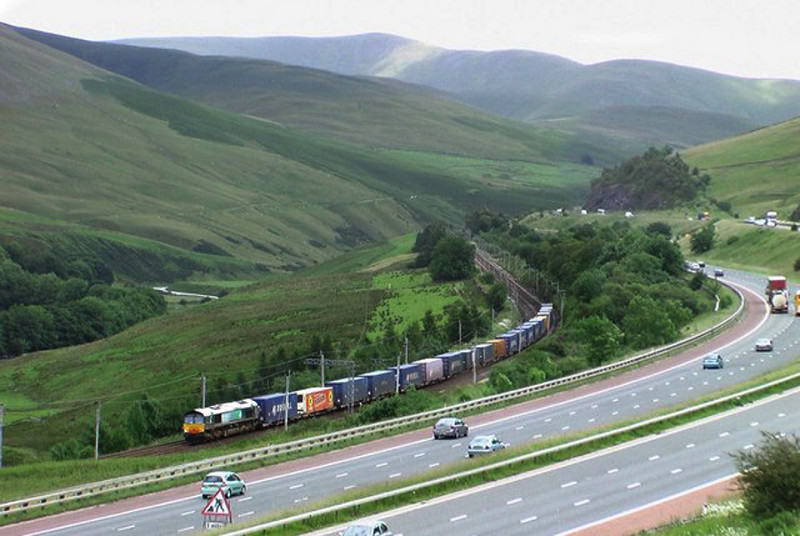
The northern WCML as it weaves through the Lune Gorge in Cumbria, alongside the M6

The spine between London Euston and Glasgow Central is 399 miles (642 km) long, with principal InterCity stations at Watford Junction, Milton Keynes Central, Rugby, Stafford, Crewe, Warrington Bank Quay, Wigan North Western, Preston, Lancaster, Oxenholme Lake District, Penrith and Carlisle.

The spine has bypasses serving the major towns and cities of Northampton, Coventry, Birmingham and Wolverhampton. Spurs serve Stoke-on-Trent, Macclesfield, Stockport, Manchester, Runcorn and Liverpool. There is also a branch to Edinburgh, from Carstairs in Scotland, although this is not the most direct route between London and Edinburgh. It provides a direct connection between the WCML and the ECML.

Originally, the lines between Rugby, Birmingham and Stafford were part of the main spine, until the Trent Valley Line was built in 1847. This line formed a direct connection between Rugby and Stafford, becoming the a part of the spine. South of Rugby, there is a bypass loop that serves Northampton. There is a spur at Weaver Junction north of Crewe to Liverpool, which is the oldest flyover-type junction in Britain. A spur branches off from Crewe to serve Manchester; two more branch off to Stoke-on-Trent: one between Colwich Junction in the Trent Valley, south of Stafford, with another north of the town.

The geography of the route was determined by avoiding large estates and hilly areas, such as the Chiltern Hills, including Tring Cutting; the Watford Gap and Northampton uplands, followed by the Trent Valley; the mountains of Cumbria, with a summit at Shap; and Beattock Summit in South Lanarkshire. This legacy means that the WCML has limitations as a long-distance main line, with lower maximum speeds than the ECML route. The principal solution has been the adoption of tilting trains, initially with British Rail's APT and latterly the Class 390 Pendolino trains constructed by Alstom, which were introduced by Virgin Trains in 2003. A 'conventional' attempt to raise line speeds, as part of the InterCity 250 upgrade in the 1990s, would have relaxed maximum cant levels on curves and seen some track realignments; this scheme faltered for lack of funding in the economic climate of the time.

== History ==
=== Pre-grouping 1837–1923 ===
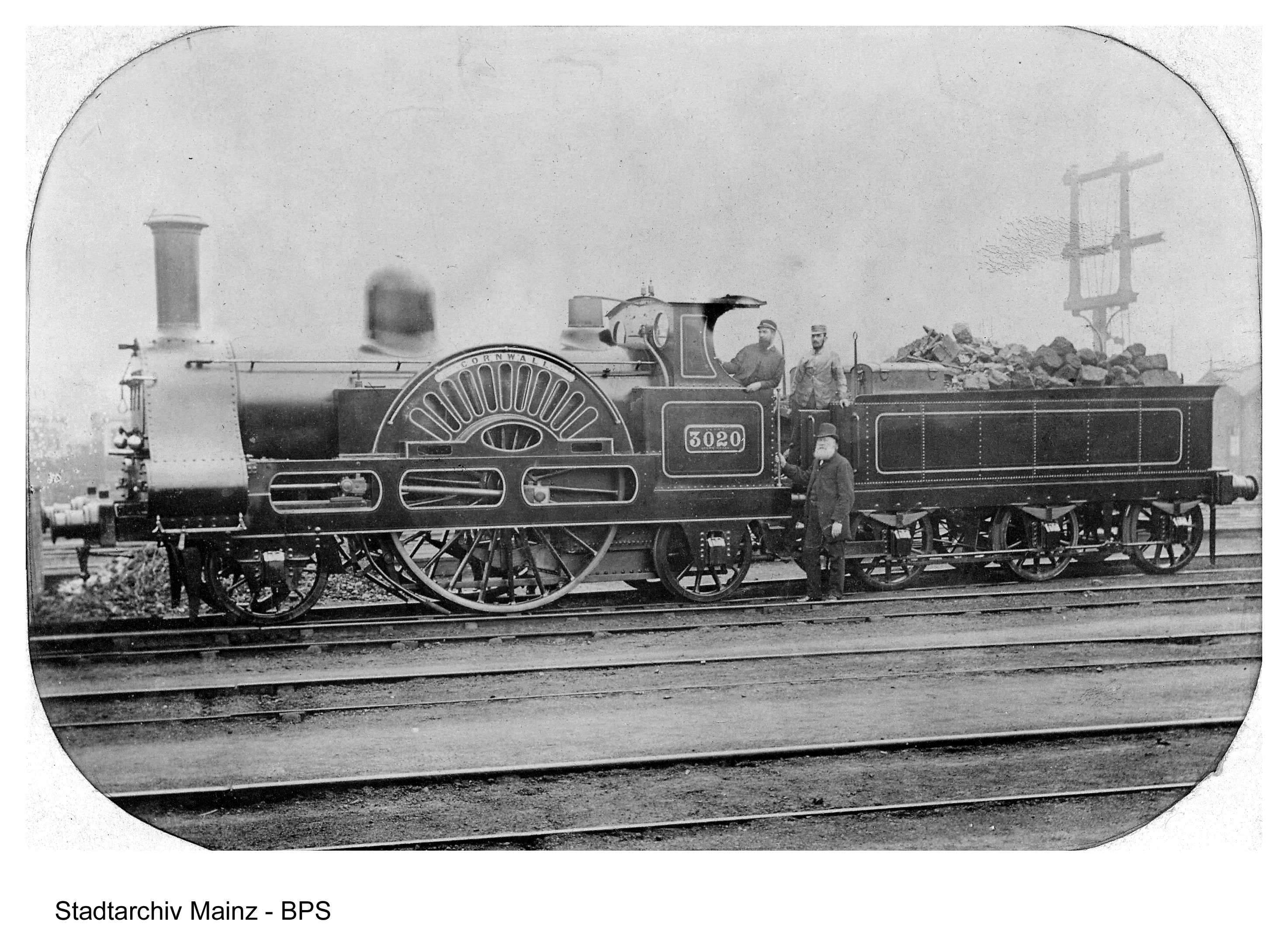
3020 Cornwall, an early LNWR express locomotive (built 1847, as pictured circa 1890)

The early history of the WCML is complex, as it was not originally conceived as a single trunk route; it was built as a patchwork of separate lines instead by different companies, mostly during the 1830s and 1840s, but some parts were opened as late as the 1880s. After the completion of the pioneering Liverpool and Manchester Railway in 1830, schemes were mooted to build more inter-city lines. The business practice of the early railway era was for companies to promote individual lines between two destinations, rather than to plan grand networks of lines, as it was considered easier to obtain backing from investors.

The first stretch of what is now the WCML was the Grand Junction Railway connecting the Liverpool and Manchester Railway to Birmingham, via Warrington Bank Quay, Crewe, Stafford and Wolverhampton, opening in 1837. The following year the London and Birmingham Railway was completed, connecting to the capital via Coventry, Rugby and the Watford Gap. The Grand Junction and London and Birmingham railways shared a Birmingham terminus at Curzon Street station, so that it was now possible to travel by train between London, Birmingham, Manchester and Liverpool. These lines, together with the Trent Valley Railway (between Rugby and Stafford, avoiding Birmingham) and the Manchester and Birmingham Railway (Crewe–Manchester), amalgamated operations in 1846 to form the London and North Western Railway (LNWR). Three other companies, the North Union Railway (Parkside–Wigan–Preston), the Lancaster and Preston Junction Railway and the Lancaster and Carlisle Railway, completed a through route to Carlisle by the end of 1846; these were later absorbed by the LNWR.

North of Carlisle, the Caledonian Railway remained independent and opened its main line from Carlisle to Beattock on 10 September 1847; it connected to Edinburgh in February 1848 and to Glasgow in November 1849. The route to Scotland was marketed by the LNWR as 'The Premier Line'. Through trains consisted of jointly-owned West Coast Joint Stock to simplify operations because the cross-border trains ran over the LNWR and Caledonian Railway. The first direct London to Glasgow trains in the 1850s took 12.5 hours to complete the 399-mile (642 km) journey.

Another important section, the North Staffordshire Railway (NSR), which opened its route in 1848 from Macclesfield (connecting with the LNWR from Manchester) to Stafford and Colwich Junction via Stoke-on-Trent, also remained independent. The NSR provided a useful alternative route to Manchester, however poor relations between the LNWR and the NSR meant that through trains did not run until 1867.

The final sections of what is now the WCML were put in place over the following decades. A direct branch to Liverpool Lime Street, bypassing the earlier Liverpool and Manchester line, was opened in 1869 from Weaver Junction, north of Crewe, to Ditton Junction, via the Runcorn Railway Bridge over the river Mersey.

At the northern end, the Caledonian replaced its original Southside terminus in Glasgow, with the much larger and better located Glasgow Central in 1879.

To expand capacity, the line between London and Rugby was widened to four tracks in the 1870s. As part of this work, the Northampton Loop was built, opening in 1881, connecting to Northampton before rejoining the main line at Rugby.

=== LMS 1923–1948 ===
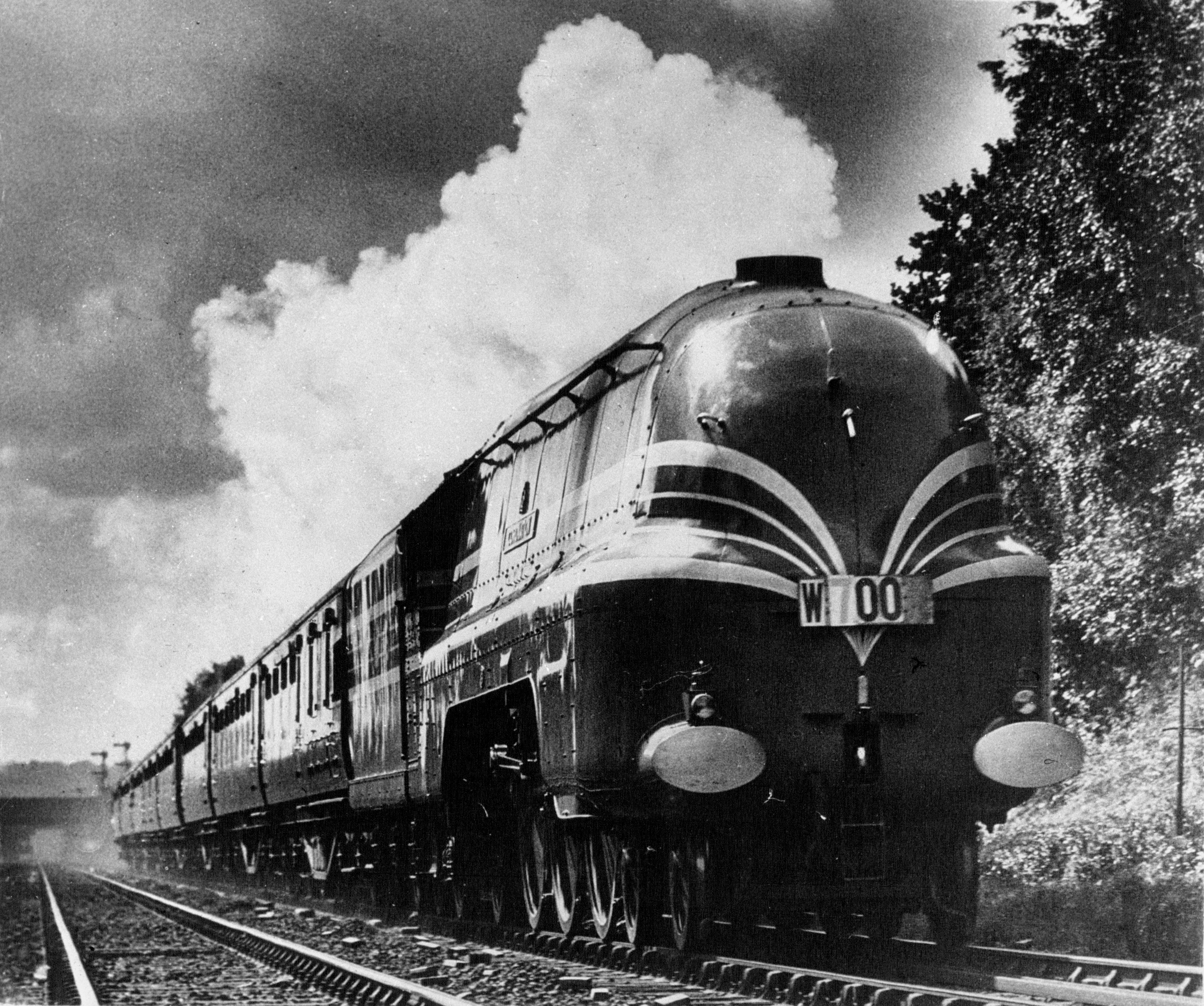
The Coronation Scot in 1937, hauled by a streamlined Coronation Class locomotive

The entire route came under the control of the London, Midland and Scottish Railway (LMS) on 1 January 1923 when the railway companies were grouped, under the Railways Act 1921.

The LMS competed fiercely with the rival London and North Eastern Railway's East Coast Main Line for London to Scotland traffic. (Note: See the Race to the North article.) Attempts were made to minimise end-to-end journey times for a small number of powerful lightweight trains that could be marketed as glamorous premium crack expresses, especially between London and Glasgow, such as the 1937–39 Coronation Scot, hauled by streamlined Princess Coronation Class locomotives, which made the journey in 6 hours 30 minutes, making it competitive with the rival East Coast Flying Scotsman (British Railways in the 1950s could not match this, but did achieve a London-Glasgow timing of 7 hours 15 minutes in the 1959–60 timetable by strictly limiting the number of coaches to eight and not stopping between London and Carlisle.

=== British Rail 1948–1997 ===
In 1948, following nationalisation, the line came under the control of British Railways' London Midland and Scottish Regions, when the term West Coast Main Line came into use officially, although it had been used informally since at least 1912.

==== Modernisation by British Rail ====
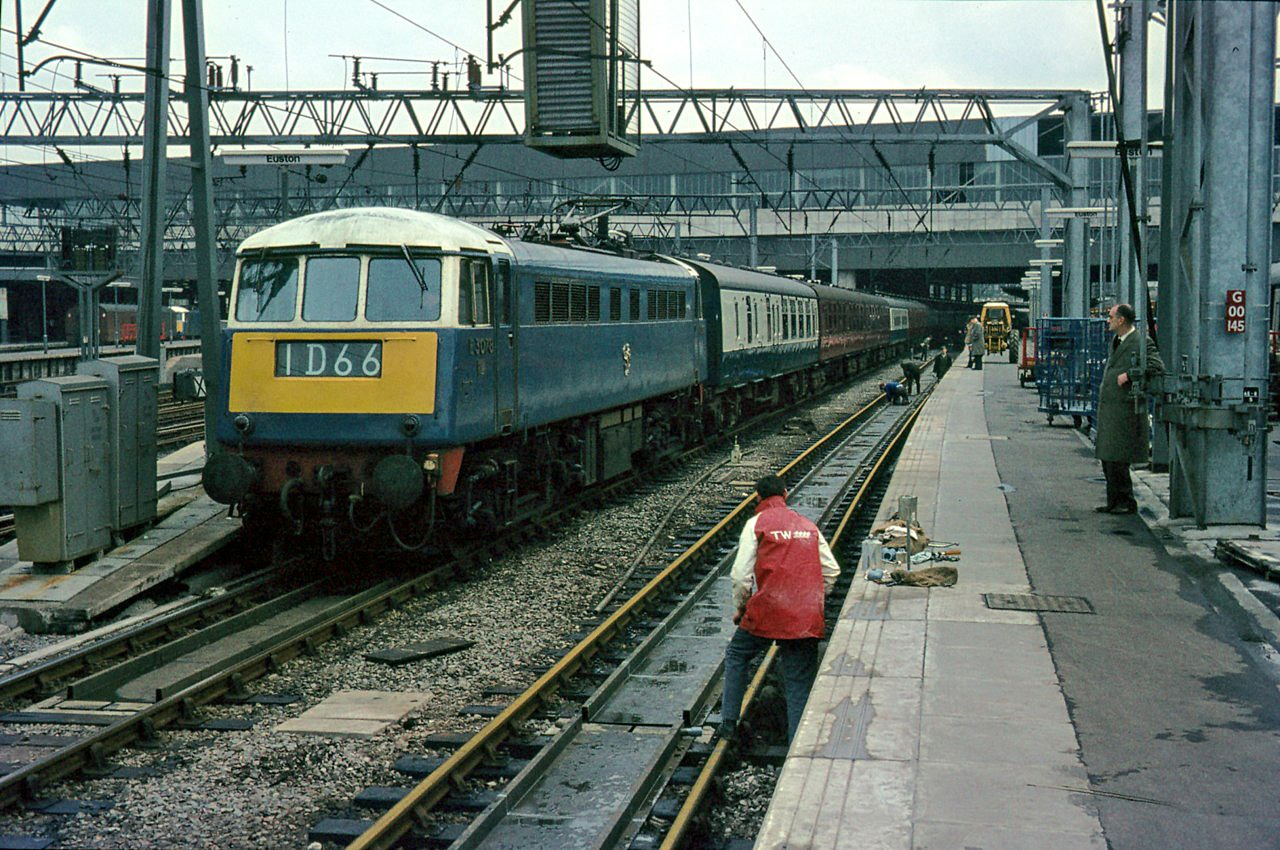
A train headed by a Class 85 electric locomotive at Euston in 1966, shortly after the introduction of electric train services on the WCML

As part of the 1955 modernisation plan, British Rail carried out a large programme of modernisation of the WCML in stages between 1959 and 1974; the modernisation involved upgrading the track and signalling to allow higher speeds, rebuilding a number of stations and electrification of the route with overhead line equipment. The first stretch to be upgraded and electrified was Crewe to Manchester, completed on 12 September 1960; this was followed by Crewe to Liverpool, completed on 1 January 1962. Electrification was then extended south to London.

The first electric trains from London ran on 12 November 1965, with a full public service to Manchester and Liverpool launched on 18 April 1966. Electrification of both the Birmingham branch and the routes to Manchester via Stoke-on-Trent was completed on 6 March 1967, allowing electric services to commence to those destinations. In March 1970, the government approved electrification of the northern half of the WCML, between Weaver Junction (where the branch to Liverpool diverges) and Glasgow, and this was completed on 6 May 1974. The announcement, after five years of uncertainty, was made 48 hours before the writ was issued for a by-election in South Ayrshire. The Observer commented that, if the £25 million decision was politically rather than financially motivated, it would have the makings of a major political scandal.

A new set of high-speed long-distance services was introduced in 1966, launching British Rail's highly successful InterCity brand (Note: A hyphen was used in the brand name at first (Inter-City), before being dropped.) and offering journey times as London to Birmingham in 1 hour 35 minutes, and London to Manchester or Liverpool in 2 hours 40 minutes (and even 2 hours 30 minutes for the twice-daily Manchester Pullman). This represented a big improvement on the 3 hours 30 minutes to Manchester and Liverpool of the fastest steam service. A new feature was that these fast trains were offered on a regular-interval service throughout the day; initially hourly to Birmingham, two-hourly to Manchester and so on.

The service proved to be so popular that, in 1972, these InterCity service frequencies were doubled to deal with increased demand. With the completion of the northern electrification in 1974, London to Glasgow journey times were reduced from 6 hours to 5. Along with electrification came modern coaches such as the Mark 2 and the fully integral, air-conditioned Mark 3 design from 1974. These remained the mainstay of express services until the early 2000s. Line speeds were raised to a maximum 110 mph (180 km/h) and these trains, hauled by Class 86 and Class 87 electric locomotives, came to be seen as BR's flagship passenger service. Passenger traffic on the WCML doubled between 1962 and 1975.

The modernisation also saw the demolition and redevelopment of several of the key stations on the line; BR was keen to symbolise the coming of the electric age by replacing the Victorian-era buildings with new structures, built from glass and concrete. Notable examples were Birmingham New Street, Manchester Piccadilly, Stafford, Coventry and London Euston. To enable the latter, the famous Doric Arch portal into the original Philip Hardwick-designed terminus was demolished in 1962, amid much public outcry.

Electrification of the Edinburgh branch was carried out in the late 1980s, as part of the ECML electrification project, to allow InterCity 225 sets to access Glasgow via Carstairs Junction.

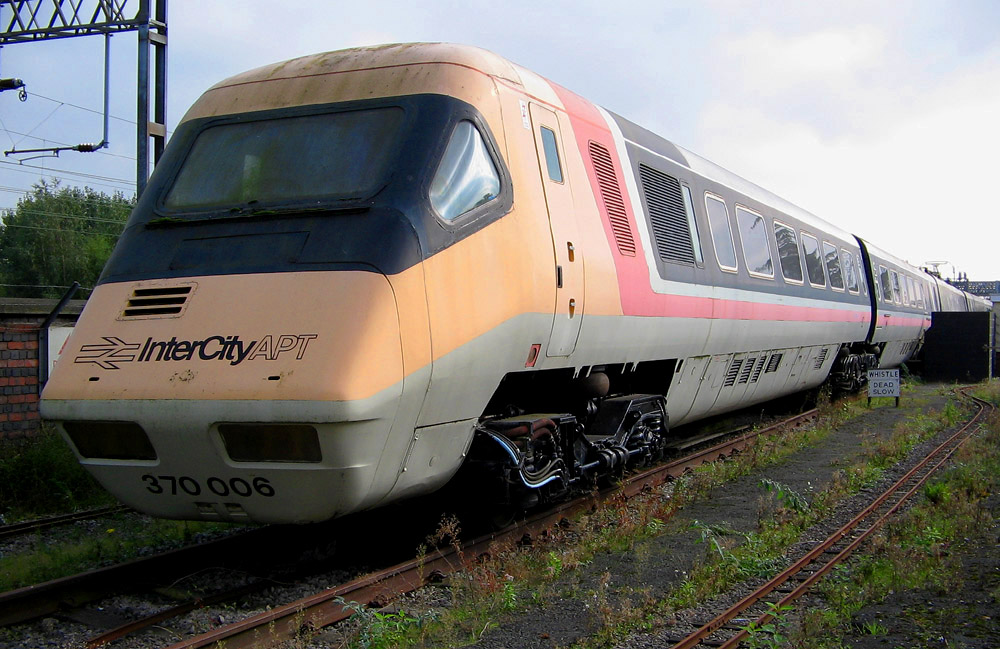
The Advanced Passenger Train, British Rail's ill-fated tilting train, seen here next to the WCML at Crewe Heritage Centre

Modernisation brought great improvements in speed and frequency. However some locations and lines were no longer served by through trains or through coaches from London, such as Windermere; Barrow-in-Furness, Whitehaven and Workington; Huddersfield, Bradford Interchange, Leeds and Halifax (via Stockport); Blackpool South; Colne (via Stockport); Morecambe and Heysham; Southport (via Edge Hill); Blackburn and Stranraer Harbour. Also notable was the loss of through services between Liverpool and Scotland; however, these were restored by TransPennine Express in 2019.

British Rail introduced the Advanced Passenger Train (APT) project, which proved that London–Glasgow WCML journey times of less than 4 hours were achievable and paved the way for the later tilting Virgin Pendolino trains. In the late 1980s, British Rail put forward a track realignment scheme to raise speeds on the WCML; a proposed project called InterCity 250, which entailed realigning parts of the line in order to increase curve radii and smooth gradients in order to facilitate higher-speed running. The scheme, which would have seen the introduction of new rolling stock derived from that developed for the East Coast electrification, was scrapped in 1992.

=== Privatised era 1997–present ===
As part of the privatisation of British Rail in the 1990s, the infrastructure was taken over in 1994 by the private company Railtrack, which later collapsed in 2002 and was replaced by the not-for-profit company Network Rail. WCML's InterCity services became part of the InterCity West Coast franchise; Virgin Trains commenced operations in 1997. In 2019, Avanti West Coast won the new West Coast Partnership franchise, taking over from Virgin.

==== Modernisation by Railtrack and Network Rail ====
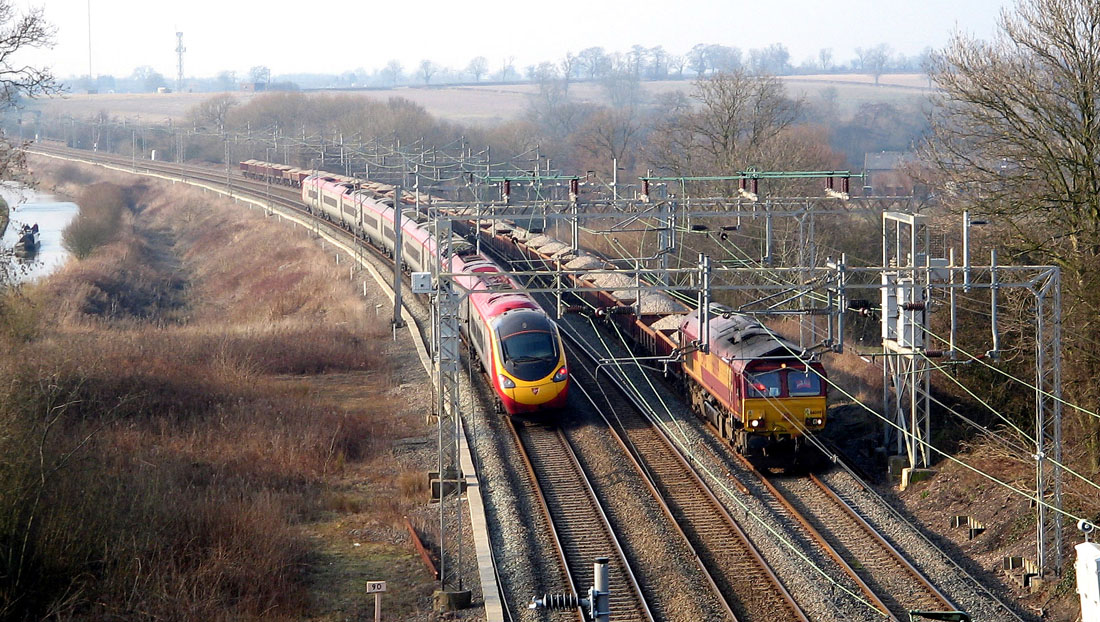
A Virgin Trains Pendolino and an EWS Class 66-hauled freight train on the WCML

By the dawn of the 1990s, it was clear that further modernisation was required. Initially this took the form of the InterCity 250 project. The modernisation plan unveiled by Virgin and the new infrastructure owner Railtrack involved the upgrade and renewal of the line to allow the use of tilting Pendolino trains with a maximum line speed of 140 mph (225 km/h), in place of the previous maximum of 110 mph (177 km/h). Railtrack estimated that this upgrade would cost £2 billion, be ready by 2005, and cut journey times to 1 hour for London to Birmingham and 1 hour 45 mins for London to Manchester.

However, these plans proved too ambitious and were subsequently scaled back. The upgrade was described as "a classic example of disastrous project management." Central to the implementation of the plan was the adoption of moving block signalling, which had never been proven on anything more than simple metro lines and light rail systems – not on a complex high-speed heavy-rail network such as the WCML. Despite this, Railtrack made what would prove to be the fatal mistake of not properly assessing the technical viability and cost of implementing moving block prior to promising the speed increase to Virgin and the government.

By 1999, with little headway on the modernisation project made, it became apparent to engineers that the technology was not mature enough to be used on the line. The bankruptcy of Railtrack in 2001 and its replacement by Network Rail, following the Hatfield crash brought a reappraisal of the plans, while the cost of the upgrade soared. Following fears that cost overruns on the project would push the final price tag to £13 billion, the plans were scaled down, bringing the cost down to between £8 billion and £10 billion, to be ready by 2008, with a maximum speed for tilting trains of a more modest 125 mph (201 km/h) – equalling the speeds available on the East Coast route, but some way short of the original target, and even further behind BR's original vision of 155 mph (250 km/h) speeds planned and achieved with the APT.

The first phase of the upgrade, south of Manchester, opened on 27 September 2004 with journey times of 1 hour 21 minutes for London to Birmingham and 2 hours 6 minutes for London to Manchester. The final phase, introducing 125 mph (201 km/h) running along most of the line, was announced as opening on 12 December 2005, bringing the fastest journey between London and Glasgow to 4 hours 25 minutes (down from 5 hours 10 minutes). However, considerable work remained, such as the quadrupling of the track in the Trent Valley; upgrading the slow lines; the second phase of remodelling Nuneaton; and the remodelling of Stafford, Rugby, Milton Keynes and Coventry stations, which were completed in late 2008. The upgrading of the Crewe–Manchester line via Wilmslow was completed in summer 2006.

In September 2006, a new speed record was set on the WCML; a Pendolino train completed the 399-mile (642 km) Glasgow Central to London Euston run in a record 3 hours 55 minutes, beating the APT's record of 4 hours 15 minutes, although the APT still holds the overall record on the northbound run.

The decade-long modernisation project was finally completed in December 2008. This allowed Virgin's VHF (very high frequency) timetable to be progressively introduced through early 2009; the highlights of which were a three trains per hour service to both Birmingham and Manchester during off-peak periods. Nearly all London-Scottish timings were brought under the 4 hours 30 minutes barrier with one service (calling only at Preston) achieving a London–Glasgow time of 4 hours 8 minutes.

Some projects that were removed from the modernisation as a result of the de-scoping, such as a flyover at Norton Bridge station, were later restarted. A £250 million project to grade-separate the tracks at Norton Bridge that allowed for increased service frequency as well as improved line-speeds was completed in spring 2016. Other projects such as the replacement of a weak bridge in Watford allowed line-speeds to be increased from 90 mph (145 km/h) to 125 mph (201 km/h), decreasing journey times.

== Infrastructure ==
=== Track ===
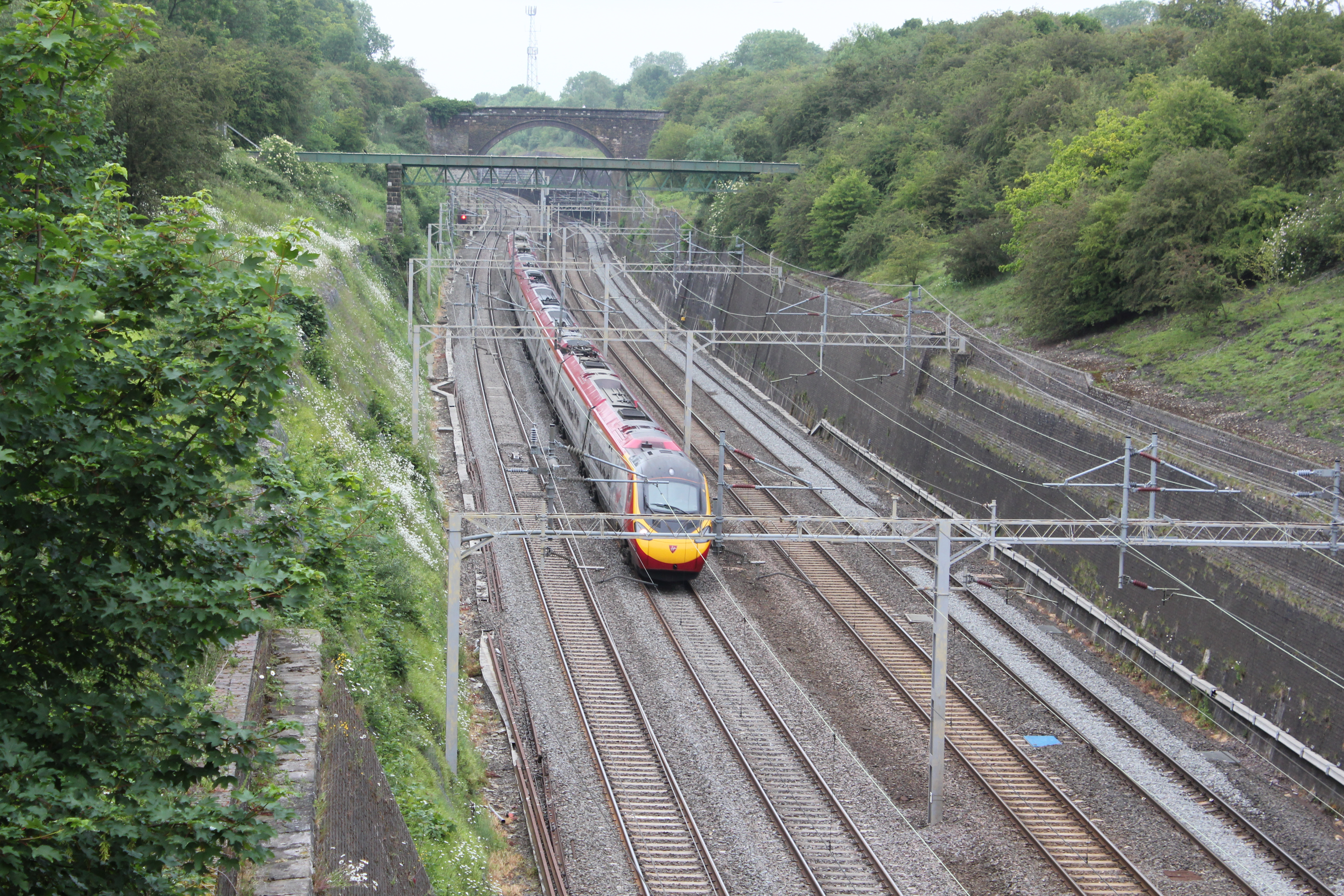
Quadruple track section of line at Roade cutting in Northamptonshire; lines have already divided south of here and diverge a little further north

The main spine of the WCML is quadruple track on almost all of the route from London to south of Winsford. At Hanslope Junction, near Milton Keynes, the line divides with one pair going direct to Rugby and the other pair diverting via Northampton to rejoin at Rugby. The spine continues north in quadruple track until Brinklow, where it reduces to triple track. The line between Brinklow and Nuneaton has three tracks, with one northbound track and fast and slow southbound tracks. The line then reverts to quadruple track at Nuneaton. North of Rugeley, there is a short double track stretch through the 777-yard (710 m) Shugborough Tunnel. The line is then quadruple track most of the way to Acton Bridge except for a double track section between Winsford and Hartford. The line becomes quadruple again between Warrington Bank Quay and Wigan North Western, except for a short section via the Golborne cut-off where it has two tracks. There are two more stretches of quadruple track, otherwise the line is double track to Scotland. The first is from Euxton Balshaw Lane to Preston, and the second is between Glasgow Central and Rutherglen.

The WCML is noted for the diversity of branches served from the spine, notably those to/from the West Midlands and North Wales, Greater Manchester and Merseyside. These are detailed in the route diagram.

The complete route has been cleared for W10 loading gauge freight traffic, allowing use of higher 9 ft 6 in (2,896 mm) hi-cube shipping containers. The route passes through Nuneaton and the Midlands and this area has been called the "Golden Triangle of Logistics".

=== Electrification ===
Nearly all of the WCML is electrified with overhead line equipment, energised at 25 kV AC. Several branches of the WCML in the North West have been electrified between 2012 and 2019, such as:

- Preston to Blackpool North line, on which electric services commenced in May 2018
- Preston to Manchester Piccadilly, via Bolton, which saw electric services commence in February 2019
- Wigan to Liverpool, via St Helens Shaw Street and St Helens Junction
- Wigan to Lostock Parkway branch.

== Rolling stock ==
The majority of stock used on the WCML is new-build, part of Virgin's initial franchise agreement having been a commitment to introduce a brand-new fleet of tilting Class 390 Pendolino trains for long-distance high-speed WCML services. The 53-strong Pendolino fleet, plus three tilting Super Voyager diesel sets, were leased for use on these inter-city services. One Pendolino was written off in 2007, following the Grayrigg derailment. After the 2007 franchise changes in the Midlands, more Super Voyagers were transferred to Virgin West Coast, instead of going to the new CrossCountry franchise. The Super Voyagers were used on London Euston to Chester and Holyhead services because the North Wales Main Line is not electrified. Super Voyagers were also used on Virgin's London-Scotland via Birmingham services, even though this route is entirely electrified; this situation changed since the expansion of the Pendolino fleet; from 2013 onward, Class 390 sets have been routinely deployed on Edinburgh/Glasgow–Birmingham services.

By 2012, the WCML Pendolino fleet was strengthened by the addition of two coaches to 31 of the 52 existing sets, turning them into 11-car trains. Four brand new 11-car sets were also part of this order, one of which replaced the set lost at Grayrigg. Although the new stock was supplied in Virgin livery, it was not expected to enter traffic before 31 March 2012, when the InterCity West Coast franchise was due to be relet, although the date for the new franchise was later put back to December 2012.

Previous franchisees Central Trains and Silverlink (operating local and regional services partly over sections of the WCML) were given 30 new Class 350 Desiros, originally ordered for services in the South East. Following Govia's successful bid for the West Midlands franchise in 2007, another 37 Class 350 units were ordered to replace its older fleet of Class 321s.

The older BR-vintage locomotive-hauled passenger rolling stock still has a limited role on the WCML, with the overnight Caledonian Sleeper services between London Euston and Scotland using Mark 3 and Mark 2 coaches until their replacement with Mark 5 stock in October 2019. Virgin also retained and refurbished one of the original Mark 3 rakes with a Driving Van Trailer and a Class 90 locomotive, as a standby set to cover for breakdowns. This set was retired from service with a railtour on 25 October 2014. In November 2014, the "Pretendolino" was transferred to Norwich Crown Point to enter service with Abellio Greater Anglia, having come to the end of its agreed lease to Virgin Trains.

In September 2022, following the death of Queen Elizabeth II, locomotive-hauled services returned briefly to the WCML once more when incumbent operator Avanti West Coast employed a rake of Mark 3 coaches, hauled by a Class 90 locomotive, to provide additional services to Euston for those wishing to travel to London for the Queen's lying-in-state and subsequent funeral.

The following tables list the rolling stock that forms core passenger services on the WCML, serving its principal termini; it is not exhaustive, as many other types use small sections of the WCML as part of other routes.

=== Commuter and regional trains ===
Family	Class	Image	Type	Top speed		Operator	Routes
Family	Class	Image	Type	mph	km/h	Operator	Routes
Sprinter	Class 153		Diesel multiple unit	75	120	Transport for Wales	Chester–Crewe
Sprinter	Class 156		Diesel multiple unit	75	120	ScotRail	Glasgow South Western Line
Sprinter	Class 158		Diesel multiple unit	90	145	Northern Trains; Transport for Wales	Settle–Carlisle line; Birmingham International–Shrewsbury; Aberystwyth, Pwllheli; Chester and Holyhead
Bombardier Turbostar	Class 170		Diesel multiple unit	100	161	CrossCountry	Cardiff Central–Nottingham; Birmingham New Street–Nottingham; Birmingham New Street–Stansted Airport; Birmingham New Street–Leicester
Siemens Desiro	Class 185		Diesel multiple unit	100	161	TransPennine Express	TransPennine North West
Second Generation	Class 318		Electric multiple unit	90	145	ScotRail	Glasgow Central–Lanark, Cathcart Circle Line and Carstairs
Second Generation	Class 320/3		Electric multiple unit	90	145	ScotRail	North Clyde Line; Argyle Line; Whifflet Line; Cathcart Circle Line
Second Generation	Class 320/4		Electric multiple unit	100	161	ScotRail	North Clyde Line; Argyle Line; Whifflet Line; Cathcart Circle Line
	Class 323		Electric multiple unit	90	145	Northern Trains	Crewe–Manchester Piccadilly; Stoke-on-Trent–Manchester Piccadilly
CAF Civity	Class 331		Electric multiple unit	100	161	Northern Trains	Crewe–Manchester Piccadilly; Stoke-on-Trent–Manchester Piccadilly; Blackpool North to Manchester Airport via Preston
Siemens Desiro	Class 350		Electric multiple unit	110	180	London Northwestern Railway	London Euston–Tring; Milton Keynes Central; Northampton and Birmingham New Street; Birmingham New Street–Liverpool Lime Street; Stafford–Crewe via Stoke-on-Trent; London Euston–Crewe, via the Trent Valley line
Bombardier Electrostar	Class 377		Electric multiple unit	100	161	Southern	Watford Junction–East Croydon
Siemens Desiro	Class 380		Electric multiple unit	100	161	ScotRail	Ayrshire Coast Line; Inverclyde Line; North Berwick Line; Paisley Canal Line; Argyle Line; Cathcart Circle Line
Hitachi AT200	Class 385		Electric multiple unit	100	161	ScotRail	Shotts Line
Alstom Aventra	Class 730/0		Electric multiple unit	90	145	West Midlands Railway	Birmingham New Street–Wolverhampton, Birmingham International and Coventry
Alstom Aventra	Class 730/2		Electric multiple unit	110	177	London Northwestern Railway	London Euston–Tring, Milton Keynes Central, Northampton and Birmingham New Street; Birmingham New Street–Liverpool Lime Street; Crewe–London Euston, via the Trent Valley line

=== High-speed trains ===
Group	Class	Image	Type	Top speed		Operator	Routes
Group	Class	Image	Type	mph	km/h	Operator	Routes
Bombardier Voyager	Class 220		Diesel-electric multiple unit	125	200	CrossCountry	Birmingham New Street–Manchester Piccadilly; Glasgow Central–Edinburgh Waverley; before joining or leaving the ECML
Bombardier Voyager	Class 221		Diesel-electric multiple unit	125	200	CrossCountry	Birmingham New Street–Manchester Piccadilly; Glasgow Central–Edinburgh Waverley; before joining or leaving the ECML
Bombardier Voyager	Class 222		Diesel-electric multiple unit	125	200	Lumo	London - Stirling
Alstom Pendolino	Class 390		Electric multiple unit	125	200	Avanti West Coast	London Euston–Manchester Piccadilly; London Euston–Liverpool Lime Street; London Euston–Blackpool North; London Euston–Birmingham New Street and the West Midlands; London Euston–Glasgow Central and Edinburgh Waverley
CAF Civity	Class 397		Electric multiple unit	125	200	TransPennine Express	Manchester Airport and Liverpool Lime Street–Glasgow Central and Edinburgh Waverley
Hitachi AT300	Class 802 Nova 1		Bi-mode multiple unit	125	200	TransPennine Express	Manchester Airport and Liverpool Lime Street–Glasgow Central and Edinburgh Waverley
Hitachi AT300	Class 805 Evero		Bi-mode multiple unit	125	200	Avanti West Coast	London Euston–Chester; London Euston–Blackpool North; London Euston–Wrexham General; London Euston–Liverpool Lime Street; London Euston–Wolverhampton; London Euston–Holyhead
Hitachi AT300	Class 807		Electric multiple unit	125	200	Avanti West Coast	London Euston–Blackpool North; London Euston–Liverpool Lime Street; London Euston–Wolverhampton; London Euston–Birmingham New Street; London Euston–Manchester Piccadilly

=== Sleeper trains ===
Class	Image	Type	Top speed		Operator	Routes
Class	Image	Type	mph	km/h	Operator	Routes
Class 92		Electric locomotive	87	140	GB Railfreight, on behalf of Caledonian Sleeper	London Euston–Glasgow Central or Edinburgh Waverley
Mark 5 coach		Lounge; Seated sleeper; Sleeping car	100	161	Caledonian Sleeper	All Caledonian Sleeper services

== Operators ==
=== Avanti West Coast ===
The current principal train operating company on the WCML is Avanti West Coast, which runs the majority of long-distance services under the West Coast Partnership rail franchise. In November 2016, the government announced that the (then named) InterCity West Coast franchise would be replaced by a new West Coast Partnership, which includes operating the planned High Speed 2 (HS2) service as well as the existing WCML express services. In August 2019, the DfT announced that First Trenitalia West Coast Rail (trading as Avanti West Coast) was the successful bidder. It commenced operation of the franchise on 8 December 2019.

Avanti operates the following general off-peak service pattern, in trains per hour (tph):

- 9 tph from London Euston; of which:
  - 3 tph to Manchester Piccadilly
  - 2 tph to Birmingham New Street; of which:
    - 1 tph continues to Scotland, via Wolverhampton, alternating between Edinburgh Waverley or Glasgow Central
  - 1 tph to each of Chester, Liverpool Lime Street and Glasgow Central, via the Trent Valley
  - 5 tpd to Holyhead
  - 1 tpd to Wrexham General.

Additional peak terminating services run between London Euston and Preston, Wolverhampton, Crewe, Birmingham International, Lancaster and Carlisle. Additional trains during the early morning, late evening, rush hour and night that terminate or start at Birmingham. There are also three daily services each weekday between London Euston and Blackpool North.

=== West Midlands Trains ===
West Midlands Trains is the current principal commuter and outer suburban operator on the route; it also provides some long-distance services which terminate at London Euston. They are all operated under the London Northwestern Railway brand.

From London Euston, there are:

- 2 tph from London to Birmingham; of which:
  - 1 tph calling at the majority of stations en route
  - 1 tph calling only at Watford Junction, Milton Keynes Central, Northampton, Rugby, Coventry, Canley, Tile Hill, Berkswell, Hampton-in-Arden, Birmingham International and Marston Green
- 1 tph to Northampton, calling at Leighton Buzzard, Bletchley, Milton Keynes Central and Wolverton
- 1 tph to Crewe, stopping at Watford Junction, Milton Keynes Central, Rugby, Nuneaton, Atherstone, Tamworth, Lichfield Trent Valley, Rugeley Trent Valley and Stafford. Some services also call at Hemel Hempstead, Berkhamsted, Tring, Cheddington, Leighton Buzzard and Bletchley.
- 2 tph to Milton Keynes Central, calling at Bushey, Watford Junction, Kings Langley, Apsley, Hemel Hempstead, Berkhamsted, Tring, Cheddington, Leighton Buzzard and Bletchley
- 2 tph to Tring, calling at Harrow & Wealdstone, Watford Junction, Hemel Hempstead and Berkhamsted.

It also operates on the following local branches off the WCML and are classified as part of it:

- 2 tph between Bletchley to Bedford, on the Marston Vale Line
- 1 train every 45 minutes between Watford Junction and St Albans Abbey, on the Abbey Line.

=== CrossCountry ===
CrossCountry operates the following services that run along the WCML.

Between Coventry and Manchester:

- 2 tph to Manchester Piccadilly
- 1 tph to Bournemouth
- 1 tph to Bristol Temple Meads; of which:
  - 2 tpd extend to Paignton.

Between Coventry and Birmingham New Street:

- 1tph to Reading
- 1tph to Newcastle.

Between Edinburgh Waverley and Glasgow Central:

- A limited service to/from Glasgow Central, which operate to either Penzance, Plymouth, Newcastle, Bristol Temple Meads or Birmingham New Street. On summer weekends, trains also extend to Paignton, Penzance and Newquay.

=== ScotRail ===
ScotRail operates services on the following sections of the WCML:

- Argyle Line trains on the section from Cambuslang to Carluke, before veering off on the short branch to Lanark or continuing to Carstairs
- North Berwick Line runs from Glasgow Central High Level, via Motherwell and Carstairs, and on to Haymarket, Edinburgh Waverley and North Berwick
- Glasgow South Western Line runs for several miles near to Carlisle, before heading west towards Dumfries, Kilmarnock, Ayr and Stranraer.

=== Southern ===
Southern operates a service on the West London Line and then between Wembley Central, Harrow & Wealdstone and Watford Junction:

- 1 tph to East Croydon
- 1 tph to Watford Junction.

=== TransPennine Express ===
TransPennine Express provides 1 tph in each direction along the WCML between Manchester Piccadilly (Note: Services commence at Manchester Airport.) or Liverpool Lime Street, and Glasgow Central or Edinburgh Waverley; services alternate between serving each.

=== Caledonian Sleeper ===
Caledonian Sleeper operates services along the length of the WCML, providing 1 tpd each way overnight between London and Scotland.

== Recent developments ==
=== Felixstowe and Nuneaton freight capacity scheme ===
A number of items of work are under way or proposed to accommodate additional freight traffic between the Haven ports and the Midlands, including track dualling:

- The Nuneaton North Chord was completed and opened on 15 November 2012; it has eased access for some trains between the Birmingham to Peterborough Line and the WCML
- The Ipswich chord was opened at the end of March 2014, allowing trains to run without reversing from the Port of Felixstowe towards the Midlands.

=== Stafford Area Improvements Programme ===
A planned flying junction and 2.5 mi (4.0 km) track diversion in the Stafford to Norton Bridge area. This replaced the previous level junction where the Stafford to Manchester via Stoke-on-Trent line diverges from the trunk route at Norton Bridge, avoiding conflicting train movements to enhance capacity and reduce journey times. This allowed two extra off-peak trains per hour from Euston to the North West, one extra train per hour from Manchester to Birmingham and one additional freight train per hour. Additional freight capacity was also provided around Stafford station.

The resignalling work associated with this project was due to be completed in summer 2015 and the Norton Bridge work was complete in December 2016, followed by a new timetable introduced in December 2017.

=== Weaver Junction to Liverpool signalling ===
Resignalling work the WCML spur track from Liverpool to Weaver Junction was underway in 2016. Signal control moved to the Manchester Rail Operating Centre, removing five local signal boxes. The signalling improvements have improved journey times on this section of line.

== Proposed development ==
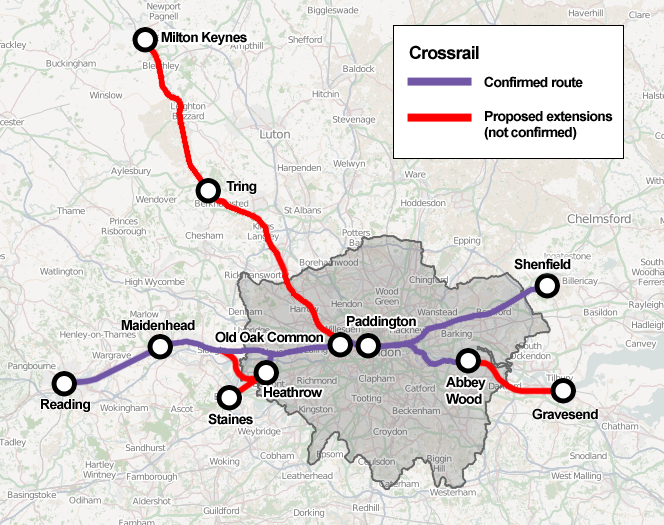
Outline map of the possible future Crossrail extensions, as recommended in the 2011 RUS, which includes the WCML

=== Increased line speed ===
In 2007, Virgin Trains proposed plans to increase the line speed in places on the WCML; this was particularly along sections of the Trent Valley Line between Stafford and Rugby from 125 to 135 mph (201 to 217 km/h), after the quadrupling of track had been completed. This would permit faster services and possibly allow additional train paths. It was claimed that 135 mph (217 km/h) was achievable by Pendolino trains, while using existing lineside signalling without the need for cab signalling via the use of the TASS system (Tilt Authorisation and Speed Supervision) to prevent overspeeding. In practice, regulations introduced by the HMRI (now the Office of Rail and Road) at the time of the ECML high-speed test runs in 1991 are still in force prohibiting this. Network Rail was aware of Virgin Trains' aspirations; however, in November 2009 Chris Mole MP (then Parliamentary Under Secretary of State, Transport) announced that there were no plans for this to happen and thus for the foreseeable future the maximum speed will remain at 125 mph (201 km/h). In promoting this proposal, Virgin Trains reported that passenger numbers on Virgin West Coast increased from 13.6 million in 1997/98 to 18.7 million in 2005/6, while numbers on CrossCountry grew from 12.6 million to 20.4 million over the same period.

=== Crossrail extension ===
In the London & South East Rail Utilisation Strategy (RUS) document published by Network Rail in 2011, a proposal was put forward to extend the Crossrail lines along the WCML as far as Tring and Milton Keynes Central. The scheme would involve the construction of a tunnel in the vicinity of the proposed new station at Old Oak Common, in West London, connecting the Crossrail route to the WCML slow lines, with a potential for interchange with the forthcoming High Speed 2 line.

A proportion of westbound Crossrail trains terminate at London Paddington, due to capacity limitations; the RUS recommends that the WCML extension as it will enable these services to continue beyond Paddington, maximising the use of the central London tunnels. The RUS also notes that diversion of WCML regional rail services via Crossrail into central London would alleviate congestion at Euston station; consequently, this would reduce the need for the infrastructure work required on the London Underground network to accommodate HS2 passengers arriving at Euston. The Crossrail extension proposal has not been confirmed or funded. In August 2014, the government launched a study into the Crossrail extension.

== Accidents ==
Name	Date	Deaths	Injuries	Notes
2025 Shap derailment	3 November 2025	0	4	
Grayrigg derailment	23 February 2007	1	89	Accident occurred at at Lambrigg Crossovers, south of Grayrigg.
Tebay rail accident	15 February 2004	4	5	Deaths were workers; no public involvement
Norton Bridge rail crash	16 October 2003	0	1	
Winsford rail crash	23 June 1999	0	31	
Watford rail crash	8 August 1996	1	69	
Stafford rail crash (1996)	8 March 1996	1	22	
Newton rail crash	21 July 1991	4	22	
Stafford rail crash (1990)	4 August 1990	1	35	
Colwich rail crash	19 September 1986	1	60	
Wembley Central rail crash	11 October 1984	3	18	
Nuneaton rail crash	6 June 1975	6	67	
Watford Junction rail crash	23 January 1975	1	11	
Hixon rail crash	6 January 1968	11	27	
Stechford rail crash	28 February 1967	9	16	
Cheadle Hulme 'bend' derailment	28 May 1964	3	0	
Coppenhall Junction railway accident	26 December 1962	18	34	
Harrow and Wealdstone railway accident	8 October 1952	112	340	The worst peace-time railway accident in the UK.
Weedon rail crash (1951)	21 September 1951	15	36	
Lambrigg Crossing signal box between Grayrigg and Oxenholme.	18 May 1947	0	38	An express hit a light engine, due to the driver missing a signal while looking in his food box. Four were hospitalised, 34 minor injuries.
Lichfield rail crash	1 January 1946	20	21	
Bourne End rail crash	30 September 1945	43	64	
Winwick rail crash	28 September 1934	12	0	
Weedon rail crash	14 August 1915	10	21	
Quintinshill rail crash	22 May 1915	227	246	Worst ever railway accident in the UK.
Ditton Junction rail crash	17 September 1912	15	0	
Chelford rail accident	22 December 1894	14	48	
Wigan rail crash	1 August 1873	13	30 (major injuries)	
Tamworth rail crash	14 September 1870	3	13	
Warrington rail crash	29 June 1867	8	33	
Atherstone rail accident	16 November 1860	10	0	

== Route ==
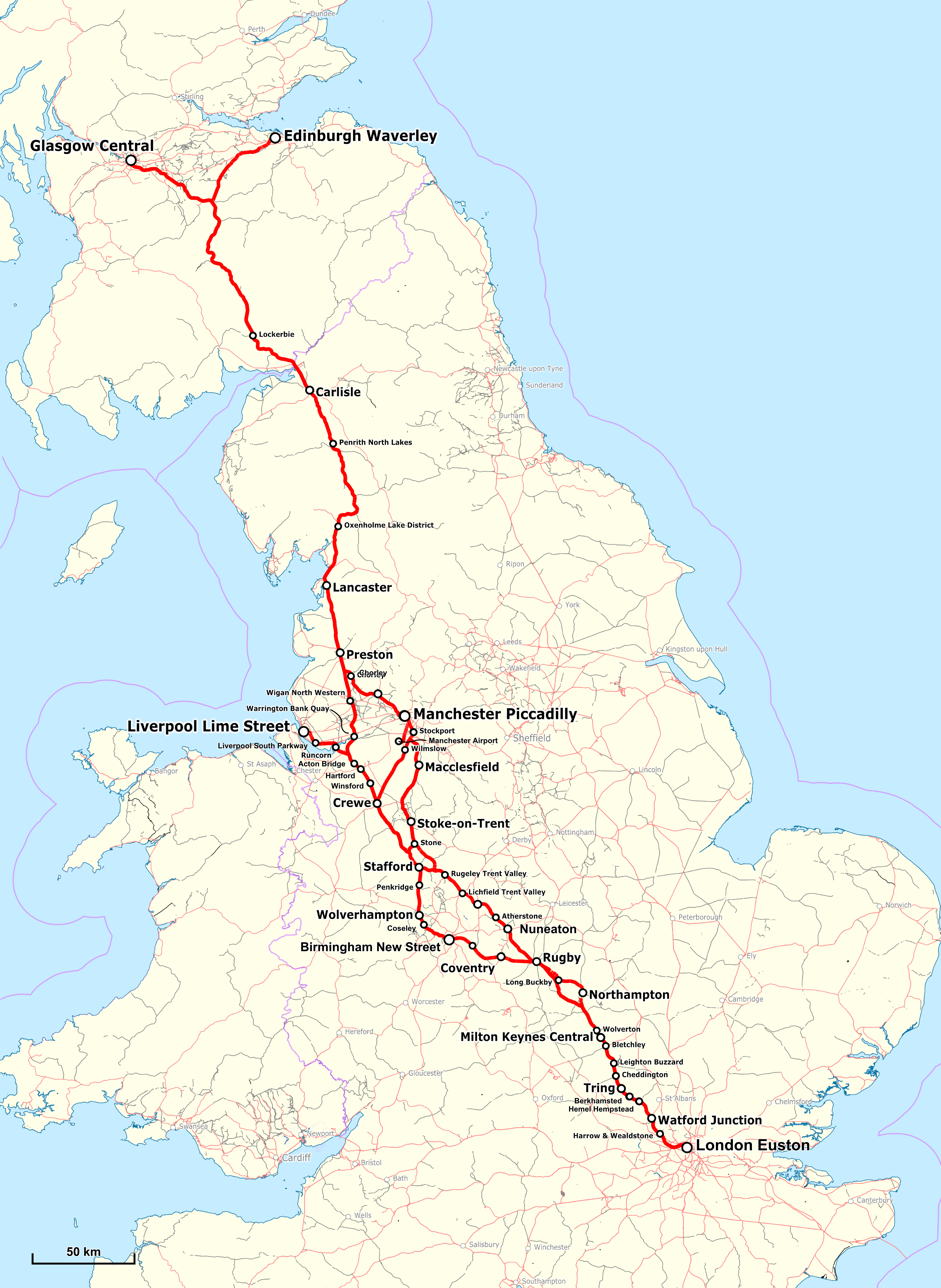
Map of the WCML

In June 2019, Network Rail formed five regions to support Britain's railways. In August and September 2019, 14 routes responsible for the operation, maintenance and renewal of infrastructure were assigned across these regions. The WCML runs through two of these regions (Scotland's Railway and North West and Central) and is a part of three routes (Scotland, North West and West Coast Main Line South).

The cities and towns served by the WCML are listed in the tables below. Stations on loops and branches are marked **. Those stations in italics are not served by inter-city services run by Avanti West Coast, but only by local trains. Between Euston and Watford Junction, the WCML is largely but not exactly paralleled by the operationally independent Watford DC Line; this is a local stopping route now part of London Overground, with 17 intermediate stations including three with additional platforms on the WCML.

The final table retraces the route specifically to indicate the many loops, branches, junctions and interchange stations on the core of the WCML.

The North Wales Coast Line between Crewe and Holyhead is not electrified. Services between London, Chester and Holyhead are operated by Class 805 bi-mode units; the route was formerly operated by Class 221 Super Voyager diesel-electric multiple units or, on occasions, a Pendolino set was hauled from Crewe to Holyhead by a Class 57/3 diesel locomotive.

=== London to Glasgow and Edinburgh ===
Town/City	Station	Ordnance Survey grid reference	Branches and loops
London	London Euston	TQ295827	
Wembley	Wembley Central	TQ182850	
Harrow	Harrow and Wealdstone	TQ154894	
Bushey	Bushey	TQ118953	
Watford	Watford Junction	TQ109973	
Kings Langley	Kings Langley	TL080019	
Apsley	Apsley	TL062048	
Hemel Hempstead	Hemel Hempstead	TL042059	
Berkhamsted	Berkhamsted	SP993081	
Tring	Tring	SP950122	
Cheddington	Cheddington	SP922185	
Leighton Buzzard	Leighton Buzzard	SP910250	
Milton Keynes (Bletchley area)	Bletchley	SP868337	
Milton Keynes (centre)	Milton Keynes Central	SP841380	
Milton Keynes (Wolverton area)	Wolverton	SP820414	
Northampton	Northampton	SP623666	Northampton loop
Long Buckby	Long Buckby	SP511759	Northampton loop
Rugby	Rugby	SP511759	
Nuneaton	Nuneaton	SP364921	
Atherstone	Atherstone	SP304979	
Polesworth	Polesworth	SK264031	
Tamworth	Tamworth	SK213044	
Lichfield	Lichfield Trent Valley	SK136099	
Rugeley	Rugeley Trent Valley	SK048191	
Stafford	Stafford	SJ918229	
Stoke-on-Trent	Stoke-on-Trent	SJ879456	Stafford–Manchester line
Congleton	Congleton	SJ872623	Stafford–Manchester line
Macclesfield	Macclesfield	SJ919736	Stafford–Manchester line
Stockport	Stockport	SJ892898	Stafford–Manchester line
Manchester	Manchester Piccadilly	SJ849977	Stafford–Manchester line
Crewe	Crewe	SJ711546	
Winsford	Winsford	SJ670660	
Northwich	Hartford	SJ631717	
Acton Bridge	Acton Bridge	SJ598745	
Runcorn	Runcorn	SJ508826	Crewe–Liverpool line
Liverpool	Liverpool South Parkway		Crewe–Liverpool line
Liverpool	Liverpool Lime Street	SJ352905	Crewe–Liverpool line
Warrington	Warrington Bank Quay	SJ599878	
Wigan	Wigan North Western	SD581053	
Euxton	Euxton Balshaw Lane		
Leyland	Leyland		
Preston	Preston	SD534290	
Lancaster	Lancaster	SD471617	
Carnforth	Carnforth	SD497706	
Oxenholme (Kendal)	Oxenholme Lake District	SD531901	
Penrith	Penrith	NY511299	
Carlisle	Carlisle	NY402554	
Lockerbie	Lockerbie	NY137817	
Carstairs	Carstairs	NS952454	
Carluke	Carluke	NS839501	
Craigneuk	Shieldmuir	NS773555	
Motherwell	Motherwell	NS750572	
Uddingston	Uddingston	NS693608	
Newton	Newton	NS664604	
Cambuslang	Cambuslang	NS639606	
Rutherglen	Rutherglen	NS615619	
Glasgow	Glasgow Central	NS587651	
Kirknewton	Kirknewton	NT104671	
Currie	Curriehill	NT176682	
Wester Hailes	Wester Hailes	NT198697	
Kingsknowe	Kingsknowe	NT210702	
Slateford	Slateford	NT223710	
Edinburgh (Haymarket/West End)	Haymarket	NT239731	Glasgow–Edinburgh via Carstairs line
Edinburgh	Edinburgh Waverley	NT257738	Glasgow–Edinburgh via Carstairs line

==== Branches and loops ====
The WCML is noted for the diversity of branches served between London and Glasgow. The adjacent diagram deals with the very complex network of lines in the West Midlands that link the old route via Birmingham with the new WCML route via the Trent Valley (i.e. 1830s versus 1840s).

In the following tables, related to the WCML branches, only the inter-city stations are recorded:

===== Rugby–Birmingham–Wolverhampton–Stafford =====
City/Town		Station	Ordnance Survey grid reference
Rugby		Rugby	SP511759; SP331781; SP187836; SP069866; SO992900; SO919988; SJ918229
Coventry	Coventry	Coventry	SP511759; SP331781; SP187836; SP069866; SO992900; SO919988; SJ918229
Coventry	Canley	Canley	SP511759; SP331781; SP187836; SP069866; SO992900; SO919988; SJ918229
Coventry	Tile Hill	Tile Hill	SP511759; SP331781; SP187836; SP069866; SO992900; SO919988; SJ918229
Balsall Common		Berkswell	SP511759; SP331781; SP187836; SP069866; SO992900; SO919988; SJ918229
Hampton in Arden		Hampton-in-Arden	SP511759; SP331781; SP187836; SP069866; SO992900; SO919988; SJ918229
Birmingham Airport		Birmingham International	SP511759; SP331781; SP187836; SP069866; SO992900; SO919988; SJ918229
Solihull	Marston Green	Marston Green	SP511759; SP331781; SP187836; SP069866; SO992900; SO919988; SJ918229
Birmingham	Lea Hall	Lea Hall	SP511759; SP331781; SP187836; SP069866; SO992900; SO919988; SJ918229
Birmingham	Stechford	Stechford	SP511759; SP331781; SP187836; SP069866; SO992900; SO919988; SJ918229
Birmingham	Adderley Park	Adderley Park	SP511759; SP331781; SP187836; SP069866; SO992900; SO919988; SJ918229
Birmingham	Birmingham city centre	Birmingham New Street	SP511759; SP331781; SP187836; SP069866; SO992900; SO919988; SJ918229
Smethwick		Smethwick Rolfe Street	SP511759; SP331781; SP187836; SP069866; SO992900; SO919988; SJ918229
Smethwick		Smethwick Galton Bridge	SP511759; SP331781; SP187836; SP069866; SO992900; SO919988; SJ918229
Oldbury		Sandwell and Dudley	SP511759; SP331781; SP187836; SP069866; SO992900; SO919988; SJ918229
Tipton		Dudley Port	SP511759; SP331781; SP187836; SP069866; SO992900; SO919988; SJ918229
Tipton		Tipton	SP511759; SP331781; SP187836; SP069866; SO992900; SO919988; SJ918229
Dudley	Coseley	Coseley	SP511759; SP331781; SP187836; SP069866; SO992900; SO919988; SJ918229
Wolverhampton		Wolverhampton	SP511759; SP331781; SP187836; SP069866; SO992900; SO919988; SJ918229
Penkridge		Penkridge	SP511759; SP331781; SP187836; SP069866; SO992900; SO919988; SJ918229
Stafford		Stafford	SP511759; SP331781; SP187836; SP069866; SO992900; SO919988; SJ918229

===== Crewe–Manchester–Preston =====
City/Town	Station	Ordnance Survey grid reference
Crewe	Crewe	SJ711546
Wilmslow	Wilmslow	SJ850811
Stockport	Stockport	SJ892898
Manchester	Manchester Piccadilly	SJ849977
Bolton	Bolton	SD719086
Preston	Preston	SD534290

==== Tunnels, viaducts and major bridges ====
Major civil engineering structures on the WCML include the following. Many of the engineering features on the southern part of the route are original to the opening of the London and Birmingham Railway in the 1830s and are now listed buildings in recognition of their historic and engineering interest.

Tunnels, viaducts and major bridges on the West Coast Main Line
Railway Structure	Length	Distance from Carlisle	ELR	Location
Clyde Bridge	8 chains	102 miles 04 chains – 101 miles 76 chains	WCM2	South of Glasgow Central
Eglinton Street Tunnels	200 yards (183 m)	101 miles 22 chains – 101 miles 13 chains	WCM2	South of Glasgow Central
Clyde Viaduct No. 37		94 miles 16 chains	WCM2	West of Uddingston
Orbiston Viaduct No. 24 (River Calder)	5 chains	90 miles 62 chains – 90 miles 57 chains	WCM2	Between Uddingston and Motherwell
Mouse Water Viaduct	5 chains	76 miles 13 chains – 76 miles 08 chains	WCM1	Between Carluke and Carstairs
Float Viaduct (River Clyde)	5 chains	72 miles 52 chains – 72 miles 47 chains	WCM1	Between Carstairs South Junction and Lockerbie
Lamington Viaduct (River Clyde)	6 chains	62 miles 70 chains – 62 miles 64 chains	WCM1	Between Carstairs South Junction and Lockerbie
Crawford Viaduct (River Clyde)	5 chains	55 miles 62 chains – 55 miles 57 chains	WCM1	Between Carstairs South Junction and Lockerbie
Harthorpe Viaduct (Elvan Water)	6 chains	47 miles 06 chains – 47 miles 00 chains	WCM1	Between Carstairs South Junction and Lockerbie
Elvan Water Viaduct		42 miles 78 chains	WCM1	Between Carstairs South Junction and Lockerbie
Cogrie Viaduct (River Annan)	4 chains	35 miles 70 chains – 35 miles 66 chains	WCM1	Between Carstairs South Junction and Lockerbie
Dryfe Water Viaduct	4 chains	27 miles 32 chains – 27 miles 28 chains	WCM1	Between Carstairs South Junction and Lockerbie
Milk Water Viaduct	7 chains	23 miles 75 chains – 23 miles 68 chains	WCM1	Between Lockerbie and Carlisle stations
Mein Water Viaduct		17 miles 65 chains	WCM1	Between Lockerbie and Carlisle stations
Kirtle Water Viaduct		15 miles 60 chains	WCM1	Between Lockerbie and Carlisle stations
Sark Viaduct (Scotland/England Border)		8 miles 55 chains	WCM1	Between Lockerbie and Carlisle stations
Esk Viaduct	7 chains	6 miles 50 chains – 6 miles 43 chains	WCM1	Between Lockerbie and Carlisle stations
Eden Viaduct	3 chains	1 mile 23 chains – 1 mile 20 chains	WCM1	Between Lockerbie and Carlisle stations
Caldew Viaduct	7 chains	0 miles 66 chains – 0 miles 59 chains	WCM1	Between Lockerbie and Carlisle stations
		Distance from Lancaster		
Eamont Viaduct	5 chains	50 miles 12 chains – 50 miles 07 chains	CGJ7	Between Penrith and Oxenholme stations
Lowther Viaduct	7 chains	48 miles 57 chains – 48 miles 50 chains	CGJ7	Between Penrith and Oxenholme stations
Birkbeck Viaduct		33 miles 28 chains	CGJ7	Between Penrith and Oxenholme stations
North Lune Viaduct		32 miles 20 chains	CGJ7	Between Penrith and Oxenholme stations
River Lune		31 miles 55 chains	CGJ7	Between Penrith and Oxenholme stations
Docker Garth's Viaduct	6 chains	24 miles 03 chains – 23 miles 77 chains	CGJ7	Between Penrith and Oxenholme stations
Beela Viaduct		13 miles 02 chains	CGJ7	Between Oxenholme Lake District and Lancaster
Lune Viaduct	12 chains	0 miles 38 chains – 0 miles 26 chains	CGJ7	Between Oxenholme Lake District and Lancaster
		Distance from Preston		
Lancaster Canal		20 miles 36 chains	CGJ6	
Conder Viaduct		16 miles 76 chains	CGJ6	Between Lancaster and Preston
Wyre Viaduct		13 miles 01 chains	CGJ6	Between Lancaster and Preston
Barton Viaduct		4 miles 30 chains	CGJ6	Between Lancaster and Preston
Fylde Road Viaduct		0 miles 64 chains	CGJ6	Between Lancaster and Preston
		Distance from Newton-le-Willows Junction		
Ribble Viaduct	12 chains	21 miles 33 chains – 21 miles 21 chains	CGJ5	Between Preston and Wigan North Western
River Yarrow Viaduct	5 chains	14 miles 55 chains – 14 miles 50 chains	CGJ5	Between Preston and Wigan North Western
Leeds Liverpool Canal	4 chains	6 miles 04 chains – 6 miles 00 chains	CGJ5	Between Wigan North Western and Warrington Bank Quay
Leeds Liverpool Canal	7 chains	4 miles 24 chains − 4 miles 17 chains	CGJ5	Between Wigan North Western and Warrington Bank Quay
		Distance from London Euston		
River Mersey		181 miles 25 chains	CGJ2	South of Warrington Bank Quay
Acton Grange Viaducts (Manchester Ship Canal)	5 chains	180 miles 40 chains – 180 miles 35 chains	CGJ2	South of Warrington Bank Quay
Preston Brook Tunnel	78 yards (71 m)	176 miles 07 chains – 176 miles 04 chains	CGJ2	North of Weaver Junction
Birdswood Tunnel (Up Liverpool flyover)	1 chain	175 miles 44 chains – 175 miles 43 chains	CGJ1	Weaver Junction
Dutton Viaduct (River Weaver)	22 chains	174 miles 18 chains – 173 miles 76 chains	CGJ1	North of Acton Bridge
Vale Royal Viaduct (River Weaver)	6 chains	168 miles 72 chains – 168 miles 66 chains	CGJ1	South of Hartford
River Sow		137 miles 52 chains	LEC4	Between former Norton Bridge and Stafford
Baswich Viaducts (Staffs. & Worc. Canal and River Penk)	7 chains	131 miles 57 chains – 131 miles 50 chains	LEC2	Between Stafford and Rugeley Trent Valley
Shugborough Tunnel	777 yards (710 m)	129 miles 01 chains – 128 miles 46 chains	LEC2	Between Stafford and Rugeley Trent Valley
Shugborough Viaduct (River Trent)	3 chains	127 miles 71 chains – 127 miles 68 chains	LEC2	Between Stafford and Rugeley Trent Valley
Trent & Mersey Canal		127 mile 22 chains	LEC2	Between Stafford and Rugeley Trent Valley
River Trent Viaduct	4 chains	122 miles 18 chains – 122 miles 14 chains	LEC2	Between Rugeley Trent Valley and Lichfield Trent Valley
Trent and Mersey Canal		121 miles 29 chains	LEC2	Between Rugeley Trent Valley and Lichfield Trent Valley
Coventry Canal		115 miles 18 chains	LEC2	Between Lichfield Trent Valley and Tamworth
River Tame	4 chains	112 miles 36 chains – 112 miles 32 chains	LEC2	Between Lichfield Trent Valley and Tamworth
Tamworth Viaduct (River Anker)		109 miles 70 chains	LEC2	South of Tamworth station
Polesworth North Viaduct	4 chains	106 miles 53 chains – 106 miles 49 chains	LEC2	North of Polesworth
Polesworth South Viaduct (River Anker)	4 chains	105 miles 75 chains – 105 miles 71 chains	LEC2	Between Polesworth and Atherstone
Coventry Canal		105 miles 59 chains	LEC2	Between Polesworth and Atherstone
Coventry Canal		102 miles 05 chains	LEC2	Between Polesworth and Atherstone
River Anker Viaduct	2 chains	96 miles 38 chains – 96 miles 36 chains	LEC2	Between Nuneaton and Rugby
Ashby Canal		94 miles 61 chains	LEC2	Between Nuneaton and Rugby
Oxford Canal		89 miles 61 chains	LEC2	Between Nuneaton and Rugby
Oxford Canal		88 miles 10 chains	LEC2	Between Nuneaton and Rugby
Oxford Canal		85 miles 54 chains	LEC2	Between Nuneaton and Rugby
Avon Viaduct	5 chains	84 miles 09 chains – 84 miles 04 chains	LEC2	Between Nuneaton and Rugby
Oxford Canal		82 miles 16 chains	HNR	Northampton line, between Rugby and Long Buckby
Crick Tunnel	595 yards (544 m)	79 miles 47 chains – 79 miles 20 chains	HNR	Northampton line, between Rugby and Long Buckby
Grand Union Canal		78 miles 60 chains	HNR	Northampton line, between Rugby and Long Buckby
Watford Lodge Tunnel	115 yards	78 miles 52 chains – 78 miles 47	HNR	Northampton line, between Rugby and Long Buckby
River Nene Viaduct	5 chains	67 miles 77 chains – 67 miles 72 chains	HNR	Northampton line, between Long Buckby and Northampton
River Nene Viaduct	5 chains	66 miles 09 chains – 66 miles 04 chains	HNR	Northampton line, between Long Buckby and Northampton
Earl Cowpers (River Nene)	6 chains	65 miles 19 chains – 65 miles 13 chains	HNR	Northampton line, between Northampton and Wolverton
Grand Junction Canal	4 chains	65 miles 11 chains – 65 miles 07 chains	HNR	Northampton line, between Northampton and Wolverton
Hunsbury Hill Tunnel	1152 yards (1053 m)	64 miles 54 chains – 63 miles 70 chains	HNR	Northampton line, between Northampton and Wolverton
Roade Cutting ‘Birdcage’ support structure	49 chains	60 miles 76 chains – 60 miles 27	HNR	Northampton line, between Northampton and Wolverton
Oxford Canal		79 miles 71 chains	LEC1	Between Rugby and Wolverton
Kilsby Tunnel	1 mile 656 yards (2209 m)	78 miles 13 chains – 76 miles 64 chains	LEC1	Between Rugby and Wolverton
Leicester Branch Canal		75 miles 11 chains	LEC1	Between Rugby and Wolverton
Grand Union Canal		73 miles 09 chains	LEC1	Between Rugby and Wolverton
Weedon Viaduct	4 chains	69 miles 15 chains – 69 miles 11 chains	LEC1	Between Rugby and Wolverton
Stowe Hill Tunnel	491 yards (449 m)	68 miles 32 chains – 68 miles 09 chains	LEC1	Between Rugby and Wolverton
Grand Union Canal		62 miles 59 chains	LEC1	Between Rugby and Wolverton
Wolverton Viaduct	9 chains	53 miles 01 chains – 52 miles 72 chains	LEC1	Between Rugby and Wolverton
Grand Union Canal	2 chains	52 miles 42 chains – 52 miles 40 chains	LEC1	North of Wolverton station
Grand Union Canal		52 miles 18 chains	LEC1	South of Wolverton
Linslade Tunnels	287 yards (262 m), down fast 283 yards (259 m)	40 miles 73 chains – 40 miles 60 chains	LEC1	North of Leighton Buzzard
Grand Union Canal		34 miles 53 chains	LEC1	Between Cheddington and Tring
Northchurch Tunnels	349 yards (319 m)	29 miles 12 chains – 28 miles 76 chains	LEC1	North of Berkhamsted
Grand Union Canal		25 miles 21 chains	LEC1	Between Berkhamsted and Hemel Hempstead
Nash Mills railway bridge (crosses the Grand Union Canal)	22 miles 26 chains	Between Apsley and Kings Langley	LEC1	
Abbots Langley railway bridge	27 yards	22 miles 15 chains	LEC1	South of Kings Langley
Watford Slow Tunnel	1 mile 230 yards (1820 m)	19 miles 44 chains – 18 miles 33 chains	LEC1	North of Watford Junction
Watford Fast Tunnel	1 mile 55 yards (1660 m)	19 miles 40 chains – 18 miles 38 chains	LEC1	North of Watford Junction
Colne Viaduct	3 chains	16 miles 66 chains – 16 miles 63 chains	LEC1	North of Bushey
Bushey Arches Viaduct	6 chains	16 miles 11 chains – 16 miles 05 chains	LEC1	North of Bushey
Brent Viaducts		6 miles 77 chains	LEC1	West of Stonebridge Park
Kensal Green Tunnels	320 yards (293 m)	4 miles 59 chains – 4 miles 45 chains	LEC1	West of Kensal Green
Primrose Hill Tunnel (Fast)	1182 yards (1081 m)	2 miles 27 chains – 1 mile 54 chains	LEC1	North-west of London Euston
Primrose Hill Tunnel (Slow)	1170 yards (1070 m)	2 miles 27 chains – 1 mile ? chains	LEC1	North-west of London Euston
Lower Park Street Tunnel	127 yards (116 m)	0 miles 68 chains – 0 miles 62 chains	LEC1	North-west of London Euston
Upper Park Street Tunnel	162 yards (148 m)	0 miles 67 chains – 0 miles 60 chains		North-west of London Euston

=== WCML branches and junctions ===
Location	Type	Route	Details
Camden Jnct	Branch	18	Watford DC Line (WDCL)
+	Junction	6	North London Line from Primrose Hill joins WDCL and WCML
Willesden Jnct	Junction	6	North London Line from West Hampstead joins WDCL and WCML
+	Junction	2	West London Line from Clapham Junction joins WCML
+	Junction	6	North London Line from Richmond joins WCML
Willesden Junction	Interchange	6	North London Line with Watford DC Line
Watford Junction	Branch	18	Watford DC Line terminates at separate bay platforms
+	Branch	18	St Albans Branch Line (AC single line single section) to St Albans Abbey
Bletchley	Branch	18	Marston Vale Line to Bedford
Bletchley High Level (Denbigh Hall South Jnct)	Branch	16	Freight only line to Newton Longville (remnant of mothballed Varsity Line to Oxford)
Hanslope Junction	Loop	18	Northampton Loop leaves a few miles north of Wolverton and rejoins just south of Rugby
Rugby	Junction	17	West Midlands Main Line to Coventry, Birmingham, Wolverhampton and Stafford
Nuneaton	Junction	19	The Birmingham to Peterborough Line from Peterborough
+	Junction	17	The Coventry to Nuneaton Line
+	Junction	17	The Birmingham to Peterborough Line to Birmingham
Tamworth	Interchange	17	The Cross Country Route from Bristol and Birmingham to Derby and the North East
Lichfield Trent Valley	Interchange	17	The Cross-City Line Redditch to Lichfield
+	Junction	17	north of the station
Rugeley Trent Valley	Junction	17	The Chase Line from Birmingham to Rugeley
Colwich Junction	Branch	18	to Stoke-on-Trent and Manchester (Route 20 from Cheadle Hulme)
Stafford	Junction	17	West Midlands Main Line from Coventry, Birmingham and Wolverhampton
Norton Bridge	Branch	18	to Stone to join line from Colwich Jnct to Manchester (Route 20 from Cheadle Hulme)
Stoke-on-Trent	Junction	19	from Derby
Kidsgrove	Branch	18	to Alsager and Crewe
Cheadle Hulme	–	20	Route 18 London – Manchester Line becomes Route 20 through to Manchester
Crewe	Branch	18	from Kidsgrove (diesel service from Skegness, Grantham, Nottingham, Derby and Stoke-on-Trent)
+	Junction	14	The Welsh Marches Line from South Wales, Hereford and Shrewsbury
+	Junction	22	to Chester and the North Wales Coast Line
+	Junction	20	to Wilmslow, Manchester Airport, Stockport and Manchester
Hartford North	Junction	20	(freight only) from Northwich
Weaver Junction	Branch	18	to Runcorn and Liverpool (Route 20 from Liverpool South Parkway)
Liverpool South Parkway	–	20	Route 18 London to Liverpool Line becomes Route 20 to Liverpool Lime Street
Warrington	Junction	22	from Llandudno and Chester to Manchester
Winwick Jnct	Junction	20	to Liverpool, Earlestown and Manchester
Golborne Jnct	Junction	20	to Liverpool, Newton-le-Willows and Manchester
Ince Moss/Springs Branch Junction	Junction	20	The Liverpool to Wigan Line
Wigan	Junction	20	from Manchester
Euxton Jnct	Junction	20	The Manchester to Preston Line from Manchester
Farington Jnct	Junction	23	East Lancashire Line and Caldervale Line
Farington Curve Jnct	Junction	23	Ormskirk Branch Line, East Lancashire Line and Caldervale Line
Preston Dock	Junction	23	west
Preston	Junction	20	to Blackpool North
Morecambe South Jnct	Junction	23	to Morecambe
Hest Bank Jnct	Junction	23	from Morecambe
Carnforth Jnct	Junction	23	Furness Line to Barrow-in-Furness and the Leeds to Morecambe Line to Leeds
Oxenholme	Junction	23	to Windermere
Penrith	Junction	23	Route 23 uses two junctions to the north of the station
Carlisle	Junction	23	Route 23 Settle-Carlisle Railway and Route 9 from Newcastle
+	Junction	23	The Cumbrian Coast Line from Barrow-in-Furness
Gretna Jnct	Junction	26	to the Glasgow South Western Line
Carstairs South Jnct	Junction	24	Route 18 West Coast Main Line becomes Route 24 to Edinburgh
Carstairs South	–	26	Route 18 West Coast Main Line becomes Route 26 to Glasgow

== See also ==
- Castle Douglas and Dumfries Railway
- East Coast Main Line
- Great Central Main Line
- Highland Main Line
- Irish Sea tunnel
- Midland Main Line
- Midland Main Line railway upgrade
- Portpatrick Railway
- Rail transport in Great Britain
- West Coast Main Line route modernisation
