= Fallside railway station =

Disused railway station in Uddingston, South Lanarkshire

Coordinates: 55.8192°N 4.0616°W

Fallside

General information
- Location: Uddingston, South Lanarkshire; Scotland
- Platforms: 2

Other information
- Status: Disused

History
- Original company: Caledonian Railway
- Post-grouping: London, Midland and Scottish Railway; British Railways (Scottish Region)

Key dates
- 1 August 1872: Opened
- 1 January 1917: Closed
- 1 May 1919: Reopened
- 3 August 1953: Permanently closed
Location

Fallside railway station served the town of Uddingston, South Lanarkshire, Scotland from 1873 to 1953 on the Clydesdale Junction section of the Caledonian main line.

== History ==
The station opened on 1 August 1872 by the Caledonian Railway. To the north east was the signal box as well as numerous collieries and work sites, one being Bothwell Park Brick Works. The station closed on 1 January 1917 but reopened on 1 May 1919, before closing permanently on 3 August 1953.

== Services ==
Preceding station	Historical railways	Following station
Motherwell; Line closed, station open	Clydesdale Junction line	Uddingston; Line closed, station open
Bothwell (CR); Line closed, station closed	Bothwell line	Uddingston; Line closed, station open
Uddingston; Line and station open	West Coast Main Line	Motherwell; Line and station open
