= CV4 =

CV4 may refer to:

- CV4, a postal district in the Coventry postcode area, particularly Westwood Heath
- USS Ranger (CV-4), an aircraft carrier operated by the United States Navy from 1934 until 1946, after which she was sold for scrap
