= Burton Green =

Village in Warwickshire, England

Coordinates: 52.381°N 1.606°W

- Cromwell Tower in Burton Green, historic water tower; now a private residence.

- Mosaics in Burton Green produced by children of Burton Green Primary School to celebrate the Coronation of King Charles III.

- Location within Warwickshire
- Civil parish: Burton Green
- District: Warwick
- Shire county: Warwickshire
- Region: West Midlands
- Country: England
- Sovereign state: United Kingdom
- Post town: KENILWORTH
- Postcode district: CV8

Burton Green is a village and civil parish in the Warwick district of the county of Warwickshire, England, some 4.8 km (3.0 mi) northwest of Kenilworth (where the population can be found in Abbey Ward) and 8.8 km (5.5 mi) southwest of Coventry. It is mostly residential, surrounded by farmland and has a village hall, a primary school and a pub-restaurant 'Hickory's Smokehouse', formerly The Peeping Tom pub. The civil parish was created from part of Stoneleigh on 2 April 2012. It is situated directly on the border with southwestern Coventry and is contiguous with the city's Westwood Heath district, and borders the Metropolitan Borough of Solihull to the northwest. Burton Green comprises four roads: Red Lane, Hob Lane, Hodgetts Lane and Cromwell Lane. There is a disused water tower off Cromwell Lane, which has now been converted into a luxury private home.

Final alignment of the HS2 built Cromwell Lane Bridge in Burton Green, Warwickshire opened October 2026.

== High Speed 2 ==
The route for the currently under construction high-speed rail line High Speed 2, from London to Birmingham, will run underneath the centre of Burton Green in a 700 metres (2,300 ft) tunnel, reusing a disused rail route – the former junction between Kenilworth and Berkswell bypassing Coventry, that closed in 1969 and became a Greenway. The village hall, which lies in the path of the new railway, has been demolished and replaced with a new facility in a different location.

Photo of the new HS2 built Burton Green Village Hall opened in 2023

Former Peeping Tom Pub, now Hickory's Smokehouse in Burton Green

Bockendon Grange Farm in Burton Green, Warwick District, England
