= Uddingston railway station =

Railway station in South Lanarkshire, Scotland

Uddingston
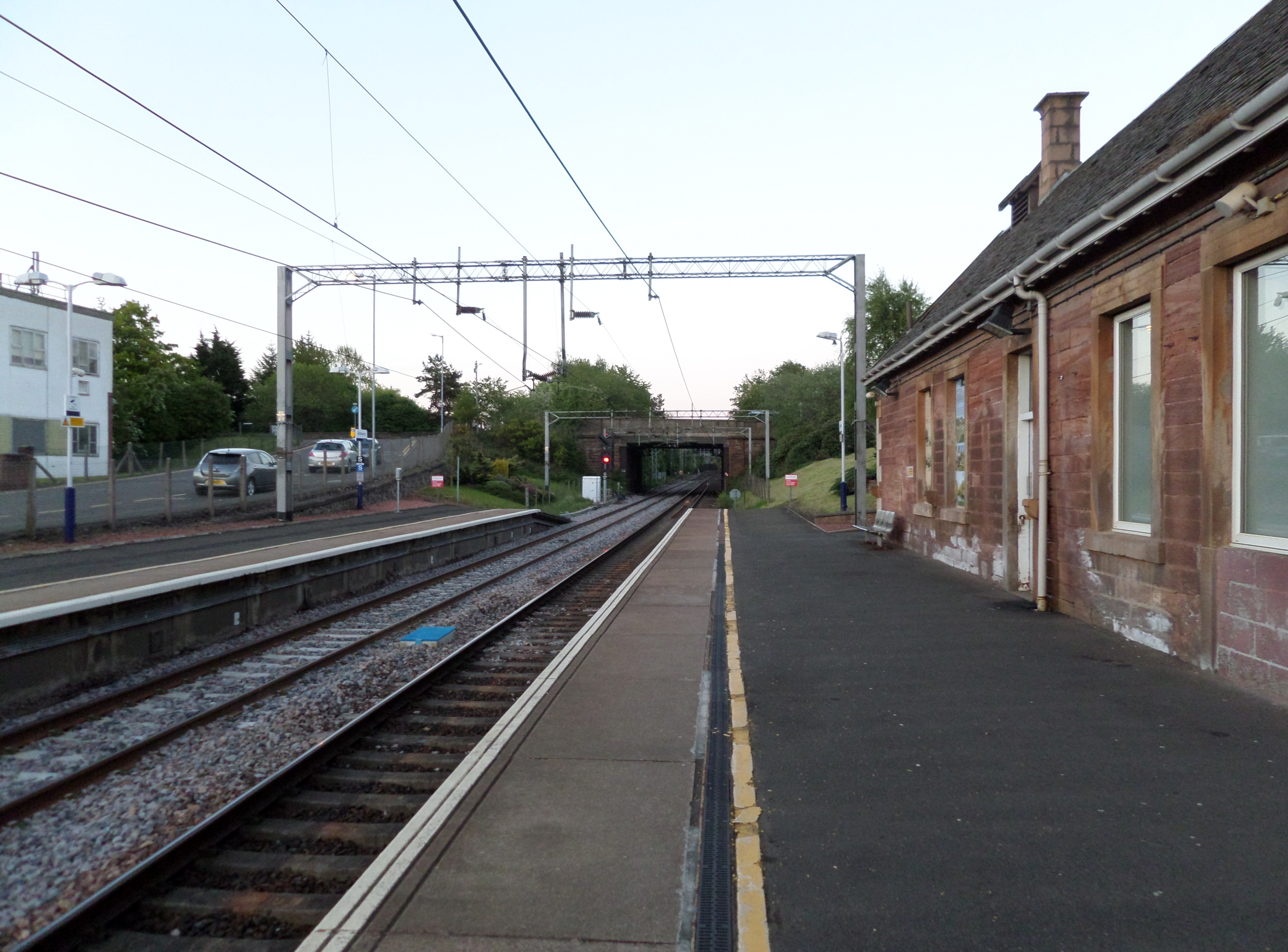

General information
- Location: Uddingston, South Lanarkshire; Scotland
- Coordinates: 55°49′25″N 4°05′12″W
- Grid reference: NS693608
- Managed by: ScotRail
- Transit authority: SPT
- Platforms: 2

Other information
- Station code: UDD

History
- Original company: Clydesdale Junction Railway
- Pre-grouping: Caledonian Railway
- Post-grouping: LMS

Key dates
- 1 June 1849: Initial station opened

Passengers
- 2020/21: ▼0.138 million
- 2021/22: ▲0.409 million
- 2022/23: ▲0.568 million
- 2023/24: ▲0.702 million
- 2024/25: 0.702 million
Location
Notes
- Passenger statistics from the Office of Rail and Road

Uddingston railway station serves the small town of Uddingston, South Lanarkshire, Scotland. ScotRail provides passenger services to this station on the Argyle Line and Shotts Line.

== History ==
=== Overview ===
The first Uddingston station, on the east side of the Glasgow Road bridge, was opened by the Clydesdale Junction Railway on 1 June 1849. In 1878, it was replaced by the second one immediately west of the bridge. The station was renamed Uddingston Central (1952–1962) to avoid confusion with the nearby Uddingston (NB) renamed Uddingston East. The latter closing in 1955, the former reverted to Uddingston in 1962.

Prior to the 2014 Whifflet Line electrification, Argyle Line services provided through links to Central Low Level via Rutherglen and then onwards to Dalmuir via Yoker northbound and to Motherwell southbound (alternate services continued to Lanark).

=== Access & facilities ===
The building on Station Road, housing various public facilities, leads to Platform 1 (Glasgow-bound trains). A footbridge over the double track connects to Platform 2 (Motherwell/Edinburgh-bound trains) and the car park.

=== Enhancements ===
Around 2005, ScotRail, SPT and South Lanarkshire Council funded improvements that included:

- £610,000 investment in more than doubling the number of parking spaces and improving pedestrian access
- installation of an automatic ticket vending machine and renewal of ticketing system within booking office
- the opening of the "Coffee Stop"
- addition of hanging baskets and floral beds through working with the local community
- new station seating both on platforms and within the waiting room
- installation of flat-screen destination displays for both platforms and waiting area
- addition of fully accessible public toilets on Platform 1
- addition of public telephone on Platform 1
- refurbishment of the waiting room on Platform 1 to meet accessibility requirements including automatic doors and accessible ticket counter

Since 2005, a volunteer group has been responsible for beautifying the station precinct with flower beds and hanging baskets.

Free parking attracted commuters from outside the area. The proposal to expand the park and ride facility appears to have been actioned in 2019.

=== Accidents ===
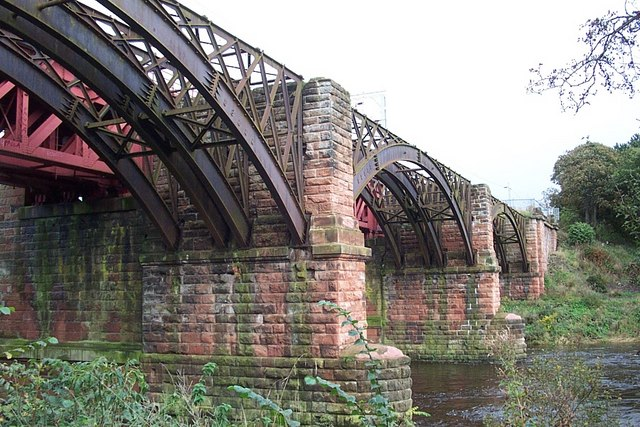
Uddingston Viaduct over the River Clyde: Disused rail bridge (1848) in foreground, Current bridge (1903) in background, October 2006.

1862: A worker at the coal depot was fatally crushed between some trucks and a passing train.

1867: On a westbound collision with the arch of the Glasgow Road bridge, a transported van rolled back into the following carriage, injuring five passengers, two seriously.

1892: A coal train struck a 12-year-old boy on the Clyde rail bridge about 600 yards (549 m) to the west. After severing his right leg and left foot, he died within hours.

1900: A passenger train bisected the upper and lower parts of a man walking about 240 yards (219 m) to the west.

1901: A passing train sliced in two a man on the rail bridge.

1902: During fog, a passing engine inflicted massive head injuries to a man by the Haughhead Colliery signal box, about three-quarters mile (1.2 km) to the west.

1903: A passenger carriage sideswiped a bridge worker. Months later, an eastbound passenger train struck a man. After the front coupling hooked the mangled body, his clothing and limbs became scattered from the colliery signal box to Bellshill.

1906: A westbound passenger train hauling three fruit vans at the rear, uncoupled one at Holytown. A brake failure caused the van to soon roll onto the main line, where it pursued and smashed into the rear of the train, which had inadvertently stopped 100 yards (91 m) west of Uddingston station. Eleven passengers received cuts and bruises, and the rolling stock incurred significant damage.

1908: A light engine hit a young man causing near fatal injuries.

1911: Near the Viewpark Colliery signal box, immediately east of Uddingston Junction, a westbound passenger train ran down two surfacemen. One died and the other sustained leg injuries and facial wounds.

1914: A porter seized a passenger, who was boarding a moving train. In the attempt to drag him back, both men dropped between the train and platform. The passenger sustained fractured ribs and the porter minor injuries. Later that year, a passing train fatally mangled a woman about one-half mile (0.8 km) to the west. The following month, a passing westbound express fatally injured a retired army doctor who fell from the platform.

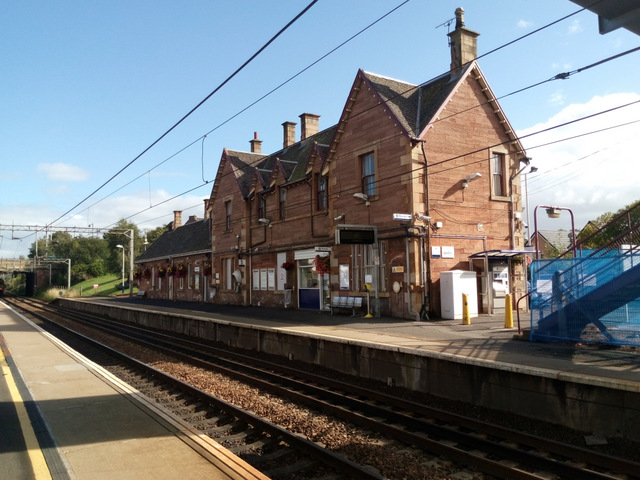
Uddingston railway station, 2015.

1920: A passing train decapitated and mutilated a man west of the rail bridge.

1932: Falling between the carriage and the platform, a woman sustained two compound fractures below the knee.

1934: A westbound express fatally injured an LMS employee supervising repairs to the rail bridge.

1936: A passenger who dropped through a carriage window onto the platform, while his train bypassed the station, incurred minor injuries.

1957: On a 12-coach Mid-Day Scot, three of the five derailed units sustained serious damage. On board, one person was killed and five were injured. Restoring the 400 yards (366 m) of damaged track took 24 hours.

2013: An individual experienced leg injuries on being struck by a train.

2014: A cyclist became trapped under a train after riding off the platform edge.

=== Sidings ===
A goods yard existed to the north east of Glasgow Rd that included the siding for John Gray & Co.'s Uddingston Iron Works. The Viewpark Colliery siding, that stretched 600 yards (549 m) west-northwest, and slightly more east-southeast, from near the present day southern end of Spindlehowe Rd, was accessed initially from that location (just east of the Uddingston Junction), and later from the NBR.

== Services ==
Passenger trains per hour
Direction	Terminus	Via	Mon–Sat	Sun (from 10am)
Eastbound	Edinburgh Waverley	Bellshill, Holytown	1	0.5
	Lanark	Motherwell, Shieldmuir	1	
	Lanark	Bellshill, Motherwell, Shieldmuir	1	1
	Motherwell	Bellshill		1
Westbound	Glasgow Central High		3	2.5

Preceding station	National Rail	Following station
Bellshill	ScotRail; Shotts Line	Cambuslang
Bellshill	ScotRail; Argyle Line	Cambuslang
	Historical railways	
Motherwell; Line and station open	Caledonian Railway; Clydesdale Junction Railway	Newton; Line and station open
Fallside; Line open, station closed	Caledonian Railway; Clydesdale Junction line	Newton; Line and station open
Bellshill; Line and station open	Caledonian Railway; Cleland and Midcalder Line	Terminus

The hourly (two-hourly Sundays) Shotts Line terminates at Edinburgh Waverley.

East and West Coast Main Line trains pass through the station to/from Glasgow Central but do not stop.

Passengers wishing to reach destinations on the routes via Central Low Level must change at Cambuslang or transfer between the main line and Low Level platforms at Central for onward connections.
