= Berkswell railway station =

Railway station in the West Midlands, England

Coordinates: 52.396°N 1.643°W

Berkswell
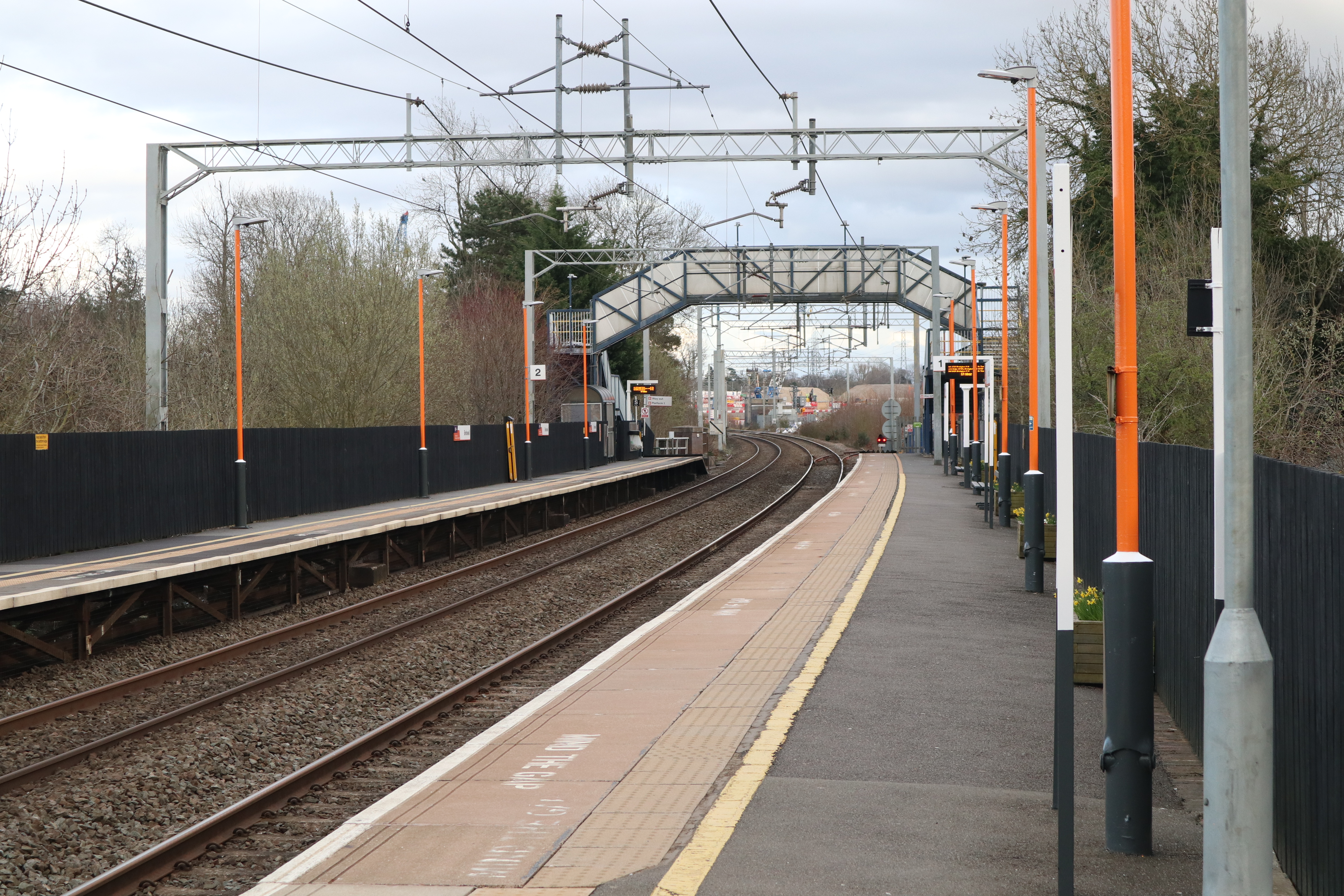

General information
- Location: Balsall Common, Solihull; England
- Grid reference: SP244776
- Manager: West Midlands Railway
- Transit authority: Transport for West Midlands
- Platforms: 2

Other information
- Station code: BKW
- Fare zone: 5
- Classification: DfT category E

Key dates
- 1844: Opened as Docker's Lane
- 1 January 1853: Renamed Berkswell
- 1 February 1928: Renamed Berkswell & Balsall Common
- 1955: Renamed Berkswell

Passengers
- 2021/22: ▲0.162 million
- 2022/23: ▲0.222 million
- 2023/24: ▲0.255 million
- 2024/25: ▲0.285 million
- 2025/26: ▲0.309 million
Location
Notes
- Passenger statistics from the Office of Rail and Road

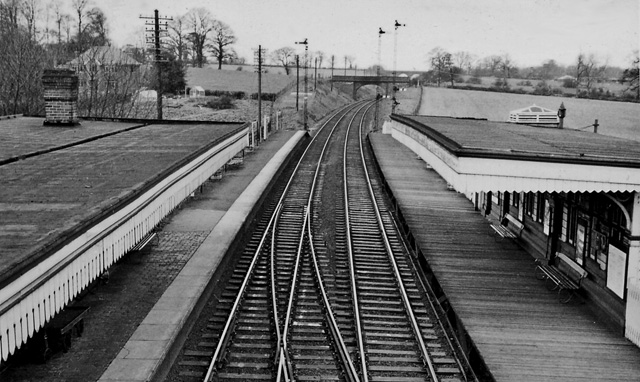
The station in 1962

Berkswell railway station (/ˈbɜːrkswəl/ BURK-swəl), in the West Midlands of England, takes its name from the nearby village of Berkswell although it is located on the northern edge of the village of Balsall Common. The station originally opened in 1844 as Docker's Lane, changed to Berkswell on 1 January 1853, then to Berkswell & Balsall Common on 1 February 1928 before reverting to Berkswell again in 1955.

It is situated on the West Coast Main Line between Birmingham and Coventry, specifically between the stations of Hampton-in-Arden and Tile Hill (in west Coventry). The station and all trains serving it are operated by West Midlands Railway, while Avanti West Coast pass through the station without stopping. There are small lakes and a river on the Eastern side of the railway station.

== History ==
Berkswell was once the junction for a LNWR line authorised in 1881 that ran to Kenilworth on the existing Coventry–Leamington line. The new line opened for goods traffic on 2 March 1884 and passengers on 2 June 1884 and provided the LNWR with a route between Birmingham and Leamington that was similar in length to the GWR's rival route through Solihull. The passenger services along this line ran from Birmingham New Street to Leamington Spa, and some continued to Rugby. It closed to all traffic on 3 March 1969. The trackbed of this line is gradually being converted into a "Greenway" for walking, cycling, and horse-riding. The route for the proposed High Speed 2 line will lie broadly parallel to this greenway, thus necessitating its realignment through and north-west of the village of Burton Green. A length of track of the Kenilworth line survives as a siding. It was occasionally used for stabling the Royal Train. Even though the station is situated in the far larger community of Balsall Common, there are currently no plans to revert its name back to the more accurate ‘Berkswell & Balsall Common’.

In 2004, as part of a plan to upgrade the line to carry more high speed trains, the level crossing situated to the east of the station was removed and two small low parallel tunnels were built under the railway, one for road traffic and the other for pedestrians. The road tunnel, being too narrow for two-way traffic, is controlled by traffic lights. The level crossings at Tile Hill and Canley were also removed in the upgrade.

== Facilities ==
The station has a ticket office located on platform 1 which is open Monday-Thursday 07:00-13:00, Friday 07:00-13:00 and 15:00-21:00, Saturday 08:00-16:00 and Sunday 10:00-16:30. When the ticket office is open tickets must be purchased before boarding the train. Outside of these times there is a ticket machine in the waiting room on platform 1 which accepts card payments only - cash and voucher payments can be made to the senior conductor on the train. When the waiting room is closed, tickets must be purchased from the ticket office (if open) or from the senior conductor on the train.

There is a free car park for rail users on Station Road. Cycle parking is also available.

Step free access is available between the platforms via the public subway on Station Road. Station staff provide information and assistance whilst the ticket office is open. Outside of these hours information is available from help points located on both platforms and from the senior conductor on the train. Berkswell station is accredited by the Secure Station Scheme.

== Services ==
Berkswell is served by two trains per hour each way, to Birmingham New Street northbound and to London Euston via Northampton southbound. There are extra services towards Birmingham New Street in the morning peak. Some services to/from London Euston are split at Northampton with one service running between Birmingham New Street and Northampton and another between Northampton and London Euston.

On Sundays there is an hourly service each way between Birmingham New Street and London Euston via Northampton.

All services are operated by West Midlands Trains. Most services are operated under the London Northwestern Railway brand but some services (mainly early morning and late night services which start/terminate at Coventry) operate under the West Midlands Railway brand.

Preceding station	National Rail	Following station
Hampton-in-Arden towards Birmingham New Street	London Northwestern Railway London–Birmingham	Tile Hill towards London Euston
Hampton-in-Arden	West Midlands Railway Coventry - Birmingham New Street/Wolverhampton Limited service	Tile Hill
Birmingham International	West Midlands Railway Coventry - Birmingham New Street/Wolverhampton Limited service	Tile Hill
	Disused railways	
Hampton-in-Arden; Line and station open	London and North Western Railway; Berkswell loop London and Birmingham Railway	Kenilworth; Line closed, station open
