= Westwood Heath =

Suburb of Coventry, England

Coordinates: 52°23′07″N 1°34′38″W

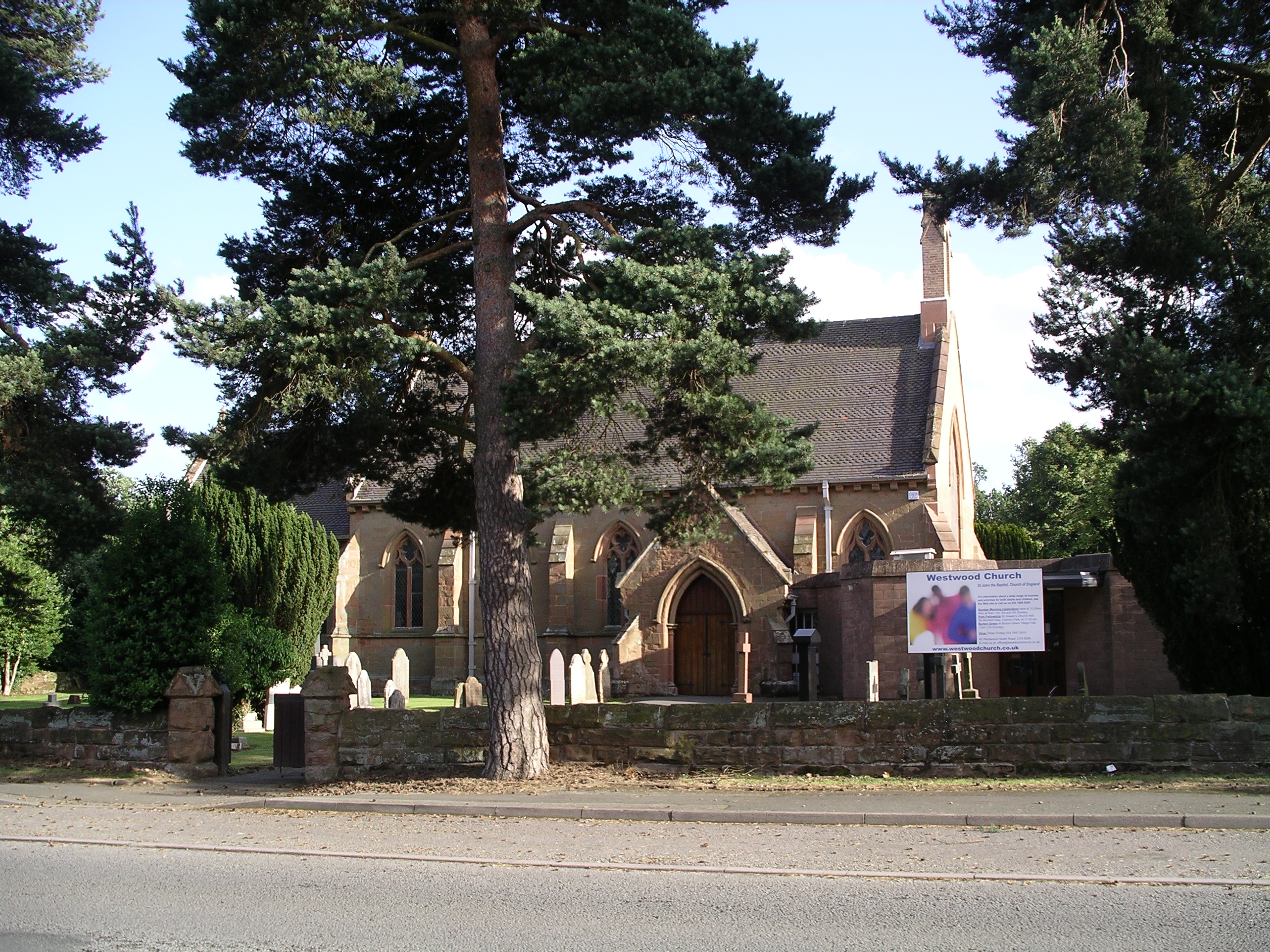
Church of St. John the Baptist ("Westwood Church")

Westwood Heath is a southwestern suburb of the City of Coventry in the West Midlands, England.

It is bordered by the suburbs of Cannon Park and Canley, and by the University of Warwick campus to the east, the suburb of Tile Hill to the north, Tile Hill Village and the village of Burton Green to the west, and rural Warwickshire to the south. Westwood Heath is considered to be one of the most prosperous districts of Coventry.

== Local landmarks ==
Some of the notable landmarks in the Westwood Heath area include:

- St John the Baptist Church
- Greek Orthodox Church
- Westwood Business Park
- The Westwood Club
- Coventry University Sports Ground
