= Tile Hill railway station =

Railway station in Coventry, England

Tile Hill
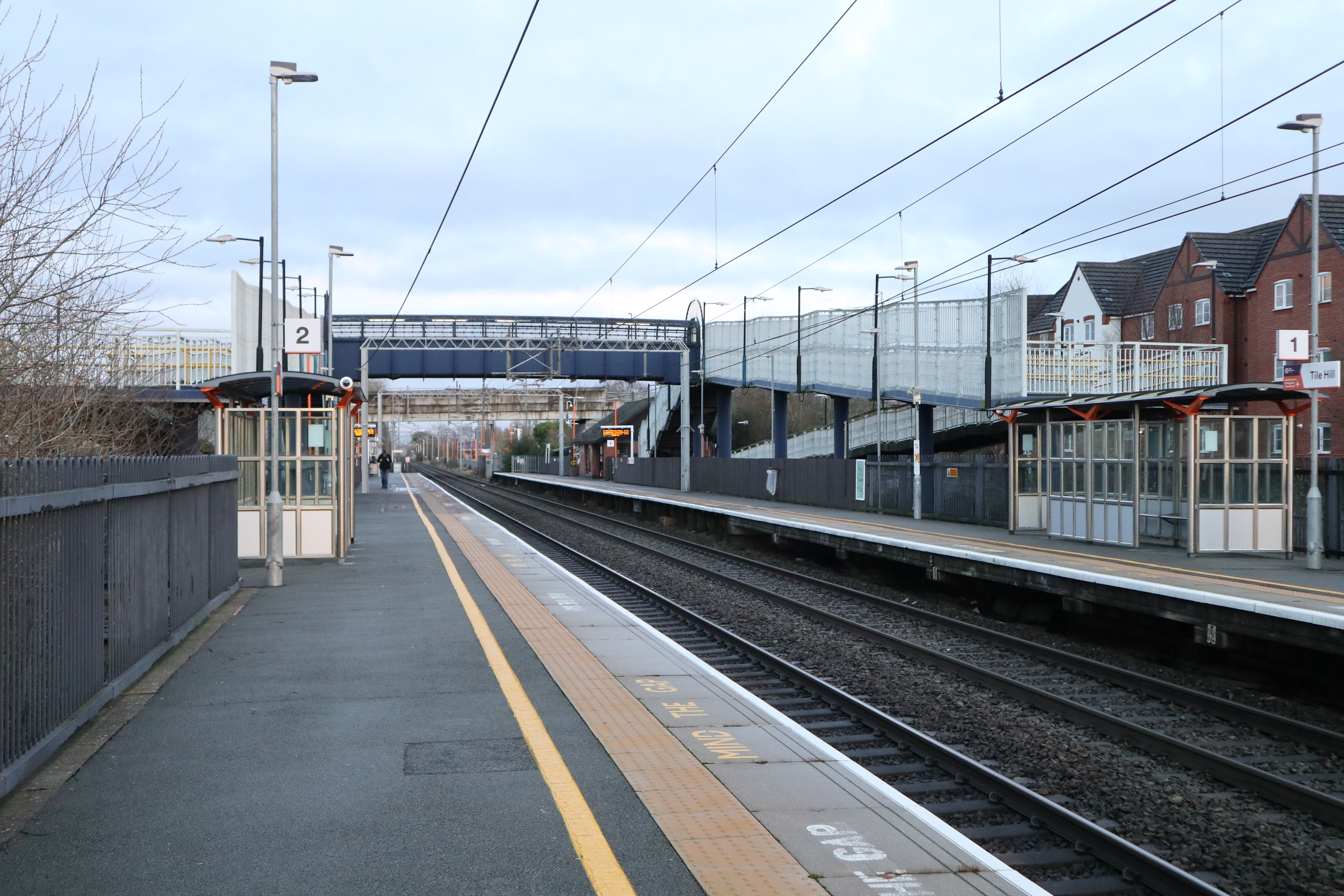
- View from the platforms in 2024 looking east

General information
- Location: Tile Hill, Coventry; England
- Coordinates: 52.3951°N 1.5970°W
- Grid reference: SP275775
- Manager: West Midlands Railway
- Transit authority: Transport for West Midlands
- Platforms: 2

Other information
- Station code: THL
- Fare zone: 5
- Classification: DfT category E

Key dates
- 1850: Station opens as Allesley Lane
- 1857: Station renamed Allesley Gate
- 1 April 1864: Station renamed Tile Hill

Passengers
- 2021/22: ▲0.326 million
- 2022/23: ▲0.428 million
- 2023/24: ▲0.483 million
- 2024/25: ▲0.542 million
- 2025/26: ▲0.570 million
Location
Notes
- Passenger statistics from the Office of Rail and Road

Tile Hill railway station is situated in the west of Tile Hill, Coventry, in the West Midlands of England. The station, and all trains serving it, are operated by West Midlands Railway.

== History ==
Tile Hill station was opened in 1850, and was originally known as Allesley Lane, until 1857 it was renamed to Allesley Gate, it assumed its current name of Tile Hill in 1864. The station was located at a point where the railway crossed the road on a level crossing. It originally had staggered platforms, with one platform on one side of the level crossing, and the other to the other side of the level crossing. The station was completely rebuilt when the line was electrified in the 1960's to its more conventional present form.

The level crossing adjacent to the station lasted until 2004, where a large bridge was built to carry road traffic over the railway and a footbridge built to connect the station platforms, Level crossings at Berkswell and Canley were also removed to upgrade the line for more high speed trains.

In 2009 the railway platform was extended, almost doubling the size. This was the case for a number of stations along the route.

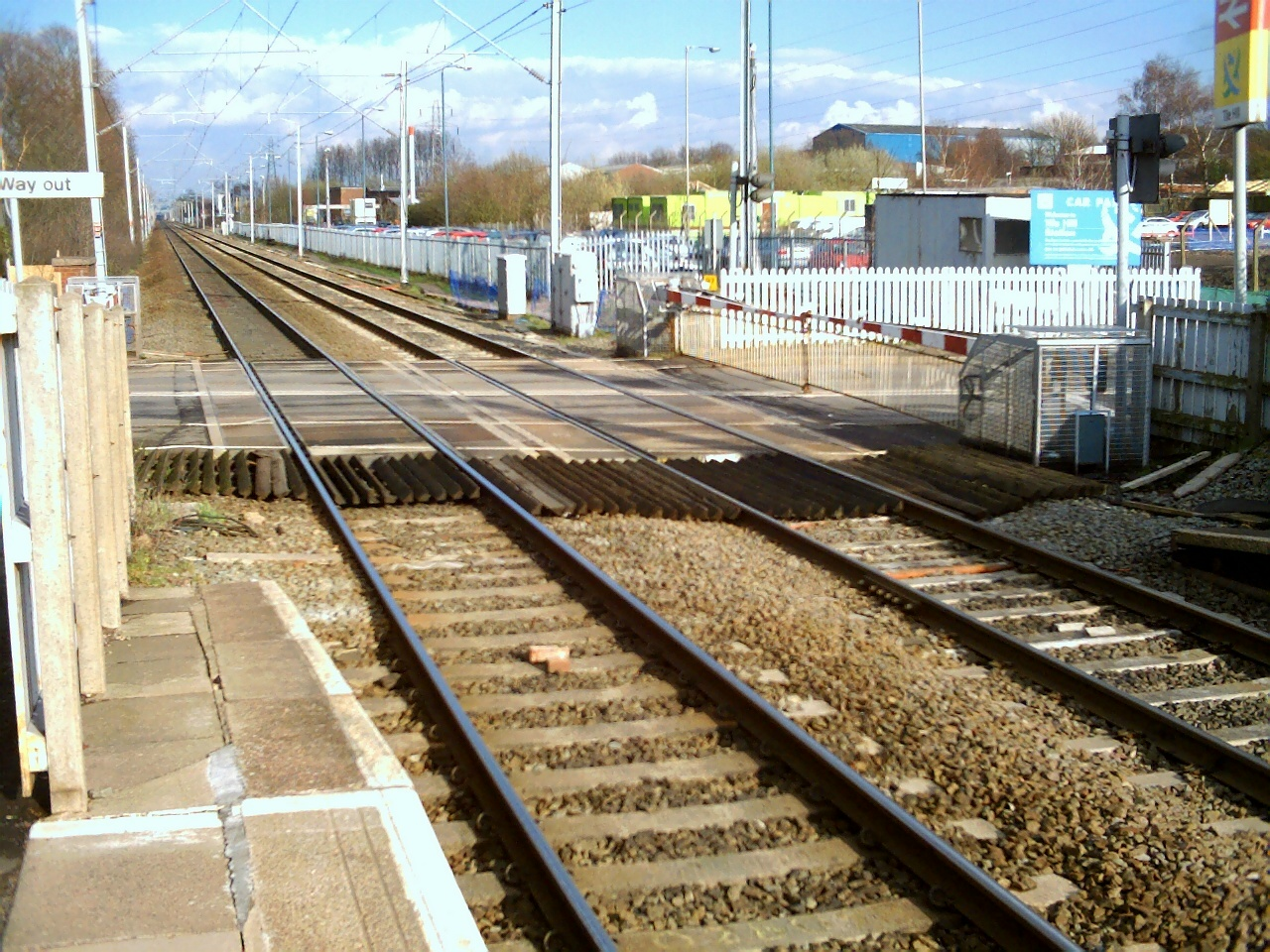
Tile Hill level crossing in 2004, shortly before it was closed and the bridge was constructed.

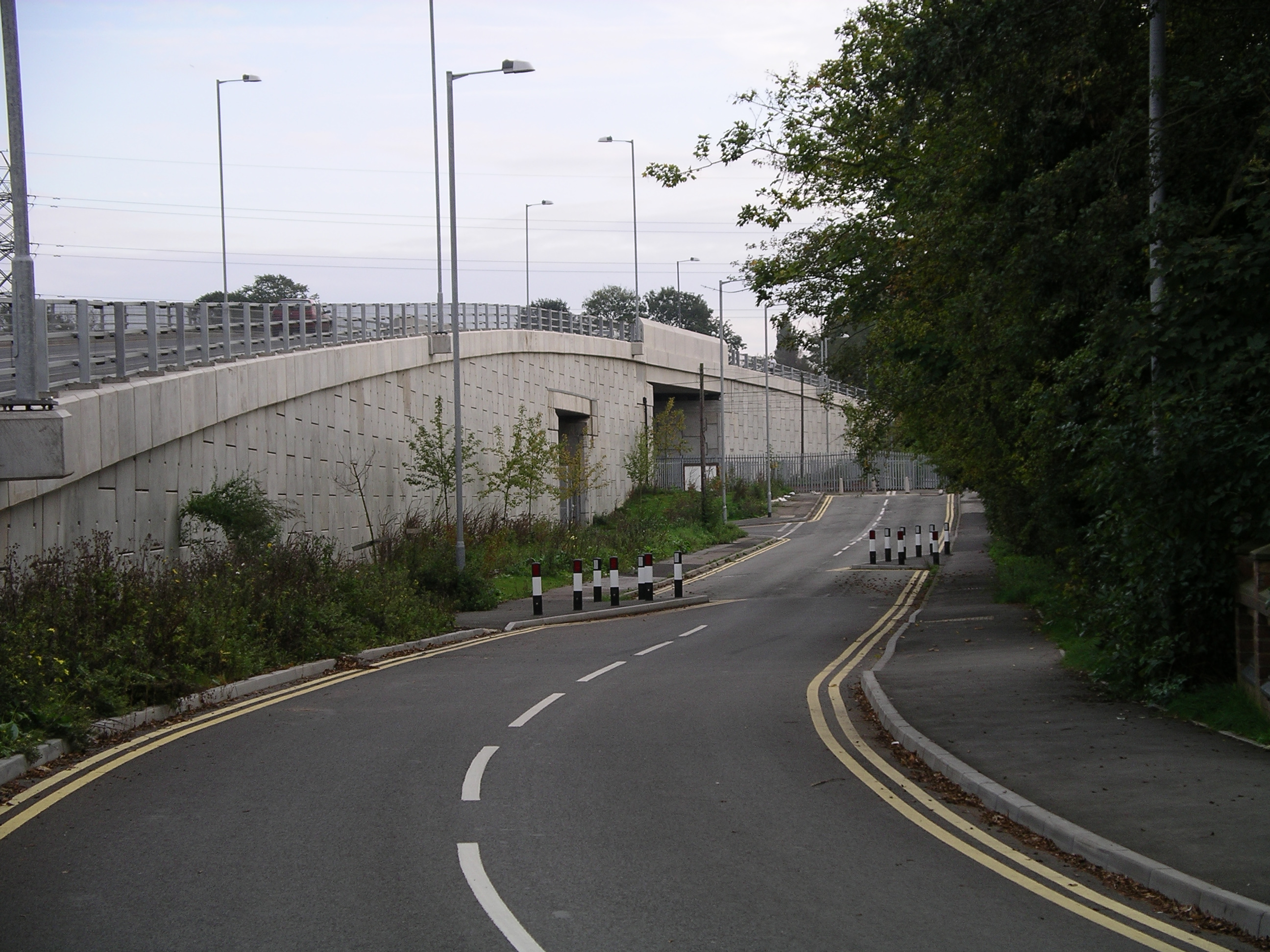
The new road bridge over the railway, adjacent to Tile Hill railway station.

== Facilities ==
The station has a ticket office located on platform 1 which is open Monday 06:00–19:00, Tuesday-Thursday 07:00–19:00, Friday 07:00–20:00, Saturday 08:00–19:00 and Sunday 08:30–14:00. When the ticket office is open tickets must be purchased before boarding the train. Outside of these times there is a ticket machine outside the ticket office which accepts card payments only - cash and voucher payments can be made to the senior conductor on the train.

== Services ==
Tile Hill is served by two trains per hour each way, to Birmingham New Street northbound and to London Euston via Northampton southbound. Some services to/from London Euston are split at Northampton with one service running between Birmingham New Street and Northampton and another between Northampton and London Euston.

On Sundays, the service is hourly during the morning with 2 trains per hour running through the afternoon.

All services are operated by West Midlands Trains. Most services are operated under the London Northwestern Railway brand but some services (mainly early morning and late night services which start/terminate at Coventry) operate under the West Midlands Railway brand.

Preceding station	National Rail	Following station
Berkswell towards Birmingham New Street	London Northwestern Railway London–Birmingham	Canley towards London Euston
Berkswell	West Midlands Railway Coventry - Birmingham New Street/Wolverhampton Limited service	Canley
