= West Coast Main Line diagram =

UK railway line diagram

The West Coast Main Line is a major trunk railway in the United Kingdom, linking London with Glasgow. The Watford DC lines are intricately linked with the southern part of the WCML and are also shown in full. A detailed diagram of the line is housed on this page for technical reasons. Note that some complex areas have been simplified for clarity.

Where dates for a railway station are shown as e.g. (1853–1959/1964) these refer to the dates of closure to passengers and freight.

This is a route-map template for the West Coast Main Line, a UK railway.

- For a key to symbols, see {{railway line legend}}.
- For information on using this template, see Template:Routemap.
- For pictograms used, see Commons:BSicon/Catalogue.

Note: Per consensus and convention, most route-map templates are used in a single article in order to separate their complex and fragile syntax from normal article wikitext. See these discussions for more information.

== Sources ==
- Butt, R. V. J. (October 1995). The Directory of Railway Stations: details every public and private passenger station, halt, platform and stopping place, past and present (1st ed.). Sparkford: Patrick Stephens Ltd. ISBN 978-1-85260-508-7. OCLC 60251199. OL 11956311M.
- Dewick, Tony (2002). Complete Atlas of Railway station Names (1st ed.). Hersham: Ian Allan Publishing. ISBN 0-7110-2798-6.
- Jowett, Alan (March 1989). Jowett's Railway Atlas of Great Britain and Ireland: From Pre-Grouping to the Present Day (1st ed.). Sparkford: Patrick Stephens Ltd. ISBN 978-1-85260-086-0. OCLC 22311137.
- Jowett, Alan (1993). Jowett's Atlas of Railway Centres: of Great Britain showing their development from the earliest times up to and including the 1990s - Volume 1 (1st ed.). Sparkford: Patrick Stephens Ltd. ISBN 1-8526-0420-4. OCLC 30919645.
- Pike, S. N. (2008) [1947]. Mile by Mile on the L.M.S. Peterborough: Silverlink Publishing. ISBN 0 947971 90 4.
- Yonge, John (2005). Gerald Jacobs (ed.). Railway Track Diagrams - Book 4: Midlands & North West (Quail Track Plans) (2nd ed.). Bradford on Avon: Trackmaps (formerly Quail Map Co.). ISBN 0-9549-8660-1. OCLC 133041211.
