= Canley railway station =

Railway station in Coventry, England

Coordinates: 52.399°N 1.548°W

Canley
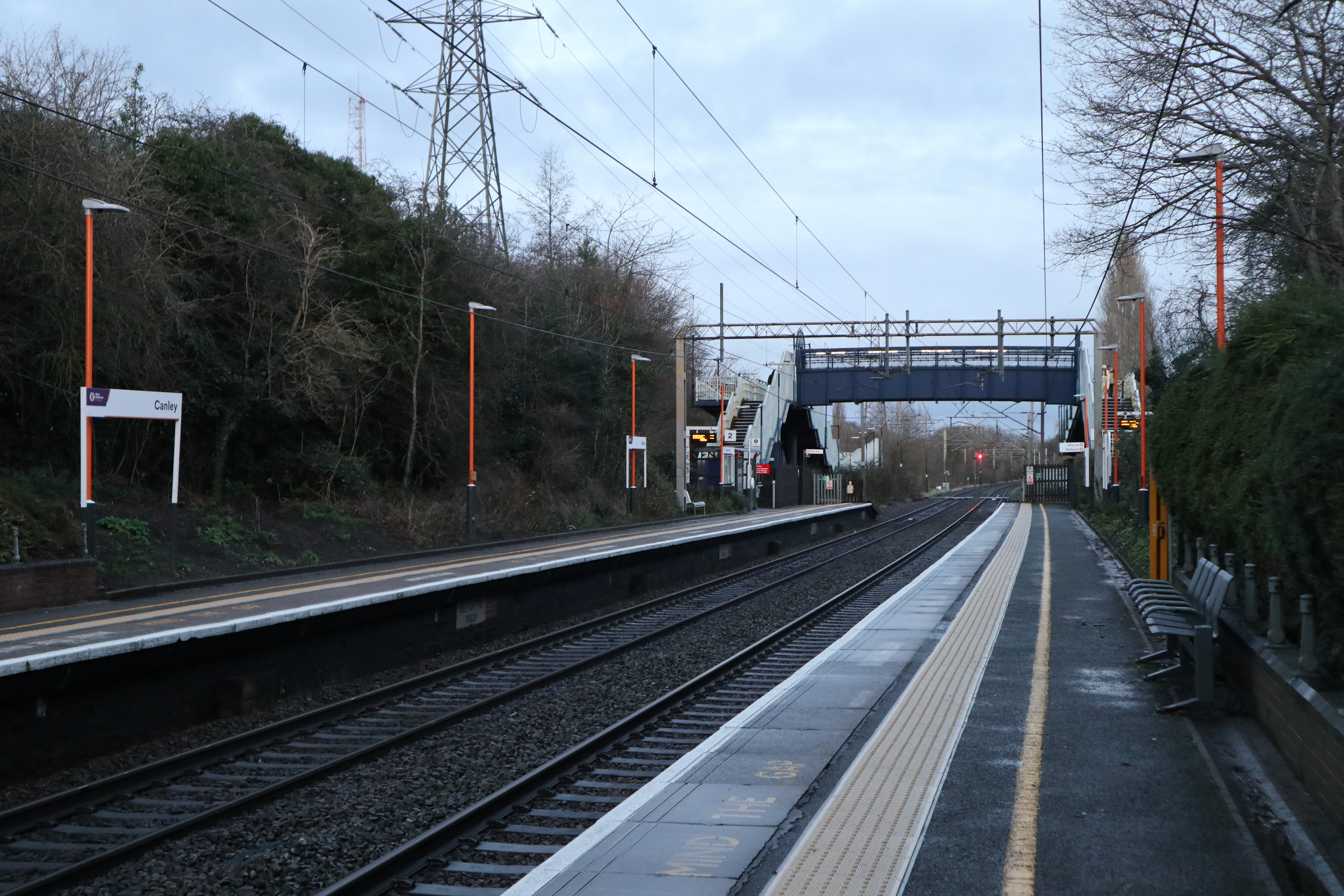
- View looking east in 2024.

General information
- Location: Canley, Coventry; England
- Grid reference: SP308780
- Manager: West Midlands Railway
- Transit authority: Transport for West Midlands
- Platforms: 2

Other information
- Station code: CNL
- Fare zone: 5
- Classification: DfT category E

Passengers
- 2021/22: ▲0.258 million
- 2022/23: ▲0.364 million
- 2023/24: ▲0.430 million
- 2024/25: ▲0.453 million
- 2025/26: ▲0.483 million
Location
Notes
- Passenger statistics from the Office of Rail and Road

Canley railway station is situated in Canley, Coventry, in the West Midlands of England. The station, and all trains serving it, are operated by West Midlands Trains, with most trains under the WMT's London Northwestern Railway brand.

It is situated on the edge of Coventry Business Park, to the west of the Earlsdon area of Coventry, and close to the University of Warwick. It has two platforms, a small booking office and waiting room.

== History ==
Canley station was opened on 30 May 1940 and originally known as Canley Halt, However, the 'Halt' suffix was later dropped as it was built primarily to serve the Standard Motor Company works alongside.

There was a railway level crossing adjacent to the station until 2002 when the road was closed and a footbridge was built over the railway line. Level crossings also at Berkswell and Tile Hill were removed in 2004 to upgrade the line for more high speed trains.

== Facilities ==
The station has a ticket office located on platform 1 which is open Monday 07:00-13:00 and 15:00-18:00, Tuesday-Thursday 07:00-12:00, Friday 07:00-19:00, Saturday 08:00-16:00 and Sunday 10:00-12:00. When the ticket office is open tickets must be purchased before boarding the train. Outside of these times there is a ticket machine outside the ticket office which accepts card payments only - cash and voucher payments can be made to the senior conductor on the train.

There are 3 car parks for the station on Canley Road - 2 are located on the Birmingham-bound side of the railway and another on the London-bound side. All car parks are free for rail users. Cycle parking is also available.

Step free access is available between the platforms via the ramp. Station staff provide information and assistance whilst the ticket office is open. Outside of these hours information is available from help points located on both platforms and from the senior conductor on the train. Canley station is accredited by the Secure Station Scheme.

== Services ==
Canley is served by two trains per hour each way, to Birmingham New Street northbound and to London Euston via Northampton southbound. There are extra services towards Birmingham New Street in the morning peak. Some services to/from London Euston are split at Northampton with one service running between Birmingham New Street and Northampton and another between Northampton and London Euston.

On Sundays there is an hourly service each way between Birmingham New Street and London Euston via Northampton.

All services are operated by West Midlands Trains. Most services are operated under the London Northwestern Railway brand but some services (mainly early morning and late night services which start/terminate at Coventry) operate under the West Midlands Railway brand.

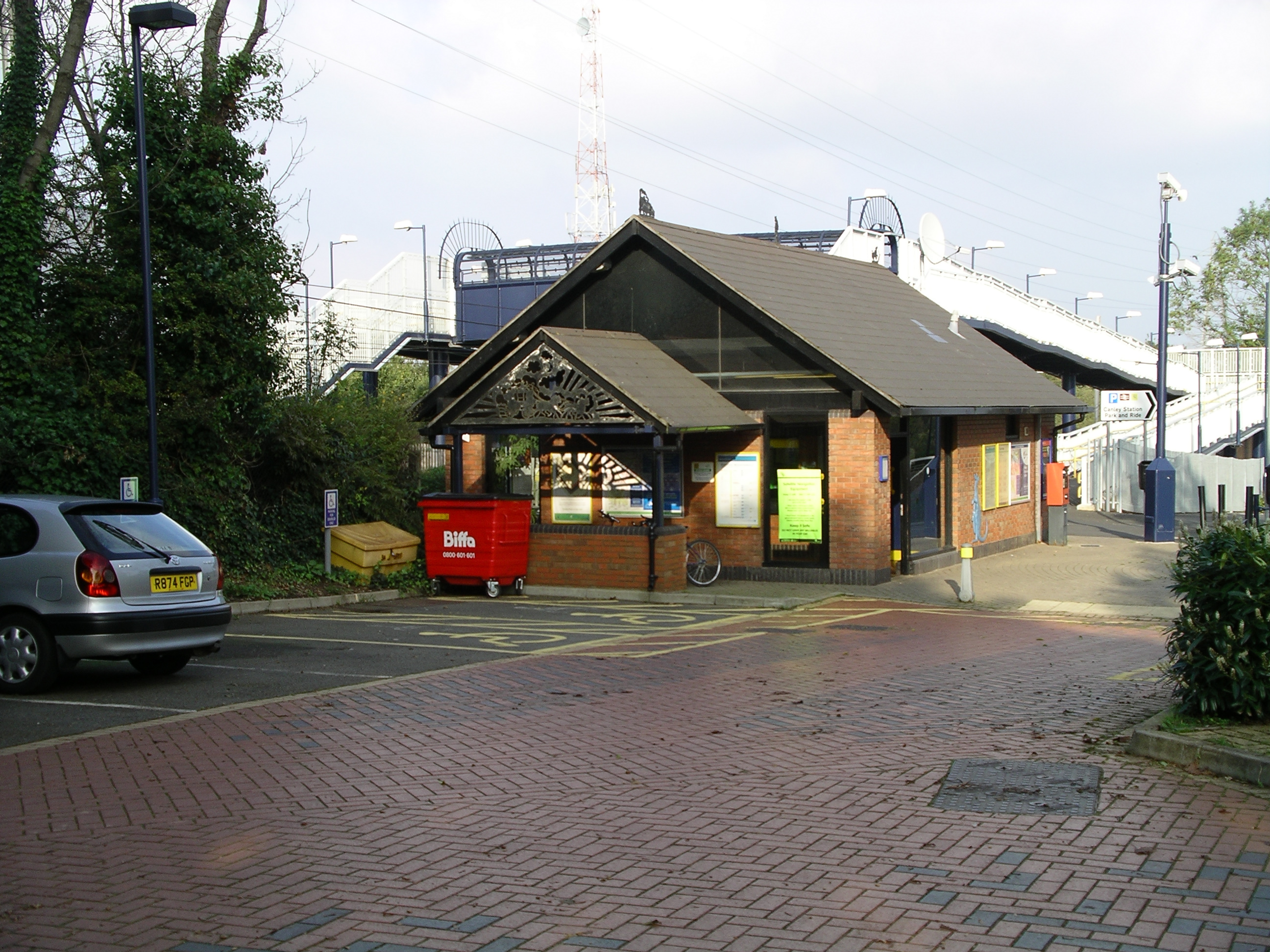
Canley railway station (from the car park)

Preceding station	National Rail	Following station
Tile Hill towards Birmingham New Street	London Northwestern Railway London–Birmingham	Coventry towards London Euston
Tile Hill	West Midlands Railway Coventry - Birmingham New Street/Wolverhampton Limited service	Coventry
