= Hawkesbury =

Hawkesbury or Hawksbury may refer to:

== People ==
- Baron Hawkesbury, or Charles Jenkinson, 1st Earl of Liverpool (1727-1808), English statesman

== Places ==
=== Australia ===
- Hawkesbury Island, Queensland, an island
- Hawkesbury River, a river in New South Wales
- City of Hawkesbury a local government area in New South Wales
- Electoral district of Hawkesbury, a seat in the New South Wales Legislative Assembly

=== Canada ===
- Hawkesbury Island, an island in British Columbia
- Hawkesbury, Ontario, a town
  - Hawkesbury Airport, or Hawkesbury (West) Airport (TC: CNV4)
  - Hawkesbury (East) Airport (TC: CPG5)
  - Hawkesbury (Windover Field) Airport (TC: CPD8)
- Port Hawkesbury, a town in Nova Scotia
  - Port Hawkesbury Airport (IATA: YPS, ICAO: CYPD)

=== New Zealand ===
- Hawksbury, New Zealand, a locality near Waikouaiti

=== United Kingdom ===
- Hawkesbury, Gloucestershire, a village in Gloucestershire
- Hawkesbury, Warwickshire, a village in Warwickshire
  - Hawkesbury Junction, a canal junction near the village
  - Hawkesbury Lane railway station, which formerly served the village

== Ships ==
- HMCS Hawkesbury, a ship of the Royal Canadian Navy
- HMAS Hawkesbury, two ships of the Royal Australian Navy

== Other uses ==
- Hawkesbury Agricultural College, New South Wales, Australia (1891-1989)
- UWS Hawkesbury, a former campus of Western Sydney University

== See also ==
- East Hawkesbury, Ontario, Canada
- Hawkesbury and Nepean Wars, Australia
- Hawkesbury River (disambiguation)
