= Coventry Colliery =

Coal mine in Warwickshire, England

- Interactive map of Coventry Colliery
- Location: Keresley, England; 52°27′25″N 1°31′41″W
- Products: Coal
- Opened: 1911
- Active: 1917–1991
- Closed: 1991
- Company: 1911–1924: Warwickshire Coal Company; 1924–1947: Coltness Iron Company; 1947–1991: National Coal Board

Coventry Colliery was a coal mine located in the village of Keresley End in northern Warwickshire, between Bedworth and Coventry, England. Closed in 1991, the site today has been redeveloped as a distribution park, owned by Prologis.

== Wykens Collieries ==
Wyken Collieries Ltd had started to extract coal from coal seams within the Warwickshire Coalfield from 1862, across three mining developments in North Warwickshire:

- Wyken Colliery: served by the Oxford Canal, in 1862 the London & North Western Railway built a short connecting mineral railway to its own Coventry to Nuneaton Line. This mine was worked out by 1881
- Alexandra Colliery: started at the same time as the Wyken, it was also served from the same LNWR railway. Miners moved to this pit after the closure of the Wyken, but it too became exhausted by 1919
- Craven Colliery: started after the other two mines, it also was served by the same LNWR branch

In 1902, the company commenced trial excavations at Keresley north of Coventry, and soon discovered a viable coal seam. The sinking of a new mine was sanctioned by an Act of Parliament, but not started due to economic problems.

== Development ==
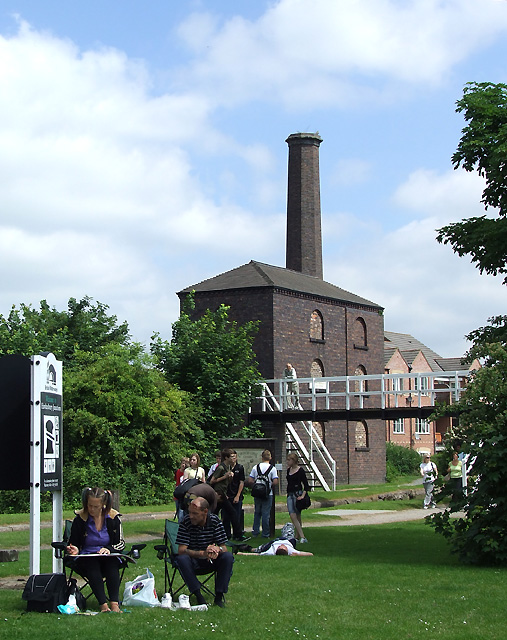
The abandoned dual-steam engine pump house of the Coventry Canal/Oxford Canal at Hawkesbury Junction. Made redundant by the sinking of the shafts of the Coventry Colliery in 1913, after this time water ingress into the colliery was pumped out into the canals

On 14 February 1911, the investors in the Wykens Collieries formed the new Warwickshire Coal Company Ltd, to take over the mines of the Wykens company and develop the coal seam at Keresley. The sinking of the shafts of the Coventry Colliery were begun immediately. By 1913, the shafts had reached below the geographical reach of the single 114 feet (35 m) shaft of the Hawkesbury Junction steam engine pump house supplying water to both the Coventry and Oxford canals. Originally built in 1821, it housed a Newcomen steam engine, which was brought from Griff Colliery, where it had already worked for 100 years. Named Lady Godiva, it was decommissioned in 1913 but left in place, moved to the Dartmouth Museum in the 1960s. This geographic resource meant that the colliery had an immediate outlet for its pumped-out water ingress.

== Operations ==
With the twin shafts sunk to a depth of 720 yards (660 m), the mine began operating in 1917. Originally, the colliery had its own branch from the Coventry Canal, but in 1919 with the return of the men from the First World War, production increased. A separate and new 2 miles (3.2 km) private railway was constructed from the LNWR's Coventry to Nuneaton Line at Three Spires Junction.

As a result of the mines expansion, the village of Keresley expanded. Modern new houses were built in the new expansion areas of Keresley Newlands and Keresley End, which included the inclusion of inside toilets and good sized gardens. In 1924 the mine company built a Social Club, operated by the Miners' Federation of Great Britain. The club closed in May 2012, after losses mounted to £500 per day.

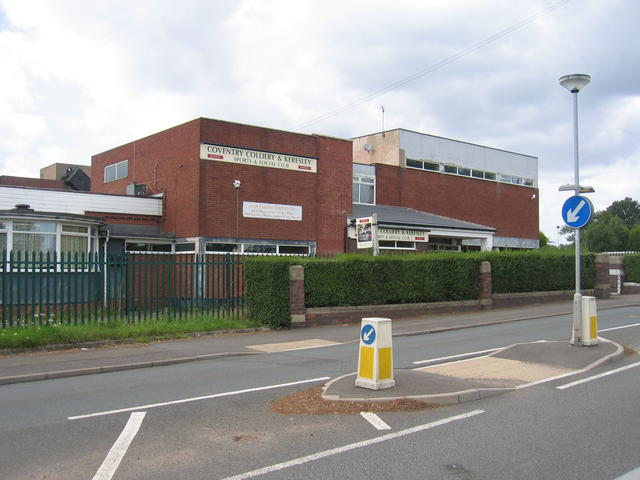
The former Coventry Colliery Social Club

In 1924 all shares in Warwickshire Coal Co Ltd were acquired by the Coltness Iron Company (CIC) Ltd. With the closure due to complete workout in 1927 of the Craven Colliery, all miners were transferred to the Coventry Colliery. With significant contracts to supply coal to electricity generation stations in Birmingham and Coventry, including the Hams Hall power stations, the company hired in over 1,000 coal wagons. By 1939, the last year of full production before the Second World War, the colliery was producing over 1,000,000 long tons (1,000,000 t) of coal per annum.

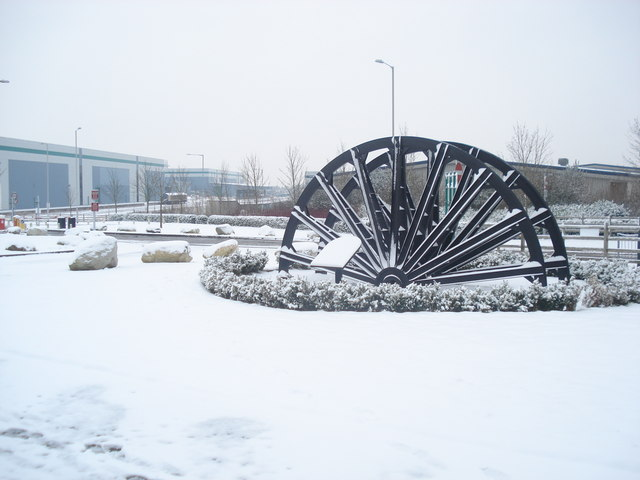
Memorial to the former workers of both the Coventry Colliery and the smokeless fuel plant, now located on the redeveloped ProLogis distribution park

Nationalised on 1 January 1947, the colliery became part of the National Coal Board's Area 4 (Warwickshire). In the early 1960s, the NCB started a development of a smokeless coal plant, known as a Homefire Plant, on site. This came into production in 1967, and resultantly in an NCB reorganisation the Coventry Colliery became part of the South Midlands Area (SMD).

Somewhat unusually for a colliery in the Midlands, there was substantial support for the 1984-1985 United Kingdom miners' strike, and it had a majority of the workforce on strike for a large part of the dispute.

The colliery closed for redevelopment in October 1991, with the site handed over to the local authority in 1996. The Homefire Plant closed in 2000.

== Transport ==
Originally, the colliery had its own branch from the Coventry Canal.

But the large amounts of spoil created, and the reduction in shipping charges associated with building materials, necessitated the building of a temporary 2 miles (3.2 km) private railway, which connected with the London & North Western Railway's Coventry to Nuneaton Line at Three Spires Junction near Foleshill. In 1919, with the return of the men from the First World War, production increased. The line was hence rebuilt as double track with extensive sidings adjacent to Three Spires Junction, and formally used for the distribution of extracted coal.

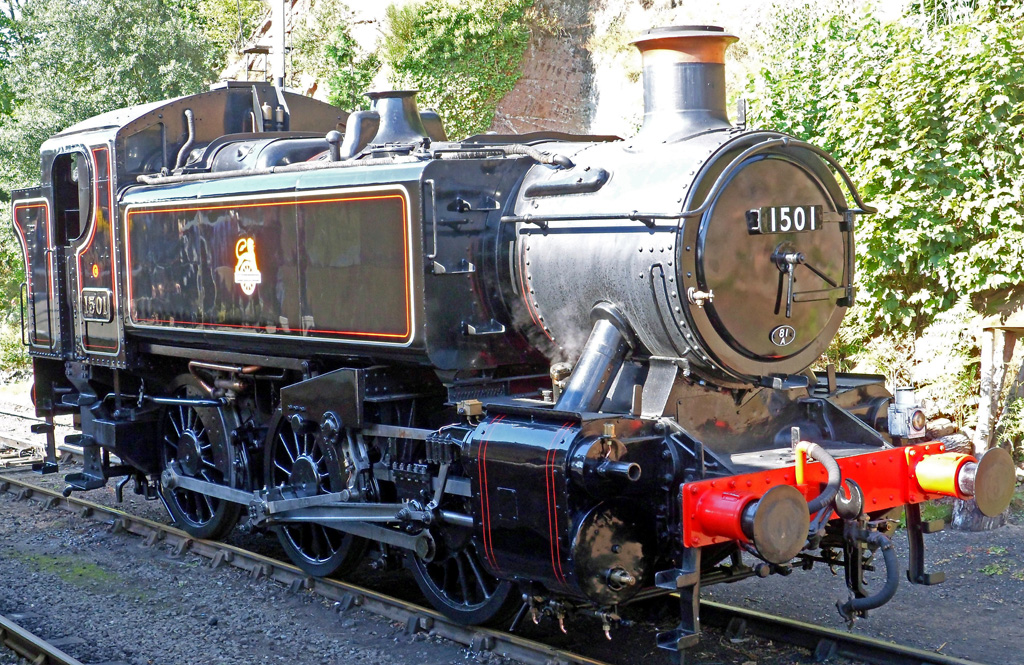
Ex-GWR 1500 Class No.1501, now in preservation at the Severn Valley Railway

On site the railway operated both 4 ft 8 1/2 in (1,435 mm) and 2 ft (610 mm), the later used for the distribution of spoil and goods onsite. The company bought its own locomotives to operate these private lines, bought new and secondhand from a range of manufacturers, including Andrew Barclay Sons & Company, North British Locomotive Company and Peckett & Sons.

In the early 1960s, with the Beeching cuts making former British Railways steam engines cheaply available, the NCB bought three ex Great Western Railway 1500 Class 0-6-0 Pannier Tanks in 1962, No.s 1501, 1502 and 1509. All three were sent to Andrew Barclay Sons & Company in Scotland for refurbishment before use on the colliery system, and their being brought into operation resulted in all of the other existing standard gauge locomotives being scrapped onsite.

In 1970, the NCB contracted in British Rail Class 08 diesel shunters. The three 1500 Class locomotives were sold into preservation at the Severn Valley Railway, with 1502 and 1509 providing a kit of spares to refurbish 1501, before they were scrapped at Cashmore's, Great Bridge in October 1970.

=== Locomotives ===
The colliery company/NCB owned and operated locomotives were:

Locomotive	Gauge	Type	Manufacturer	Built	Acquired	Disposed	Notes
Renown	4 ft 8 1/2 in (1,435 mm)	0-4-0ST	Andrew Barclay Sons & Company	1911	1911	1933	Bought new, sold on to other owners
Coventry No.1	4 ft 8 1/2 in (1,435 mm)	0-6-0T	North British Locomotive Company	1939	1939	1970	Bought new, 1962 to Ansley, 1963 to Newdigate, 1965 to Haunchwood, 1967 back to Newdigate, 1970 sold to Quainton Rly Soc. Now used as Thomas
Coventry No.2	4 ft 8 1/2 in (1,435 mm)	0-6-0ST	Peckett & Sons	19 May 1924	1924	September 1969	Type OX1. Bought new, works No. 1662. Refurbished at Andrew Barclay in 1963, it worked at the Arley Colliery, before returning to the Coventry Colliery in September 1968. Scrapped onsite by Thos W Ward the following year
Coventry No.3	4 ft 8 1/2 in (1,435 mm)	0-6-0ST	Peckett & Sons	1925	1925	1963	Type OX1. Bought new, scrapped onsite
Coventry No.4	4 ft 8 1/2 in (1,435 mm)	0-6-0ST	Peckett & Sons	1927	1927	1963	Type OX1. Bought new, scrapped onsite
Coventry No.5	4 ft 8 1/2 in (1,435 mm)	0-6-0T	Sharp, Stewart & Company		1933	1962	Ex-Barry Railway Class A, scrapped onsite
William Stratford	4 ft 8 1/2 in (1,435 mm)	0-6-0T	Andrew Barclay Sons & Company	1923	1958	1962	Ex-Baddesley Colliery, scrapped onsite
No.1501	4 ft 8 1/2 in (1,435 mm)	0-6-0PT	Swindon Works	1949	1962	1970	Acquired from British Railways 1962. Sold into preservation at the Severn Valley Railway
No.1502	4 ft 8 1/2 in (1,435 mm)	0-6-0PT	Swindon Works	1949	1962	1970	Acquired from British Railways 1962. Source of spares for No.1501, scrapped October 1970 at Cashmore's, Great Bridge
No.1509	4 ft 8 1/2 in (1,435 mm)	0-6-0PT	Swindon Works	1949	1962	1970	Acquired from British Railways 1962. Source of spares for No.1501, scrapped October 1970 at Cashmore's, Great Bridge
Coventry No.6	2 ft (610 mm)	0-4-0WT	Orenstein & Koppel	1911	1929	1942	Ex-Thos W Ward
Coventry No.7	2 ft (610 mm)	2-A	John Fowler & Company	1938	1938	1961	First diesel to operate on the colliery system

== Prologis Park, Coventry ==
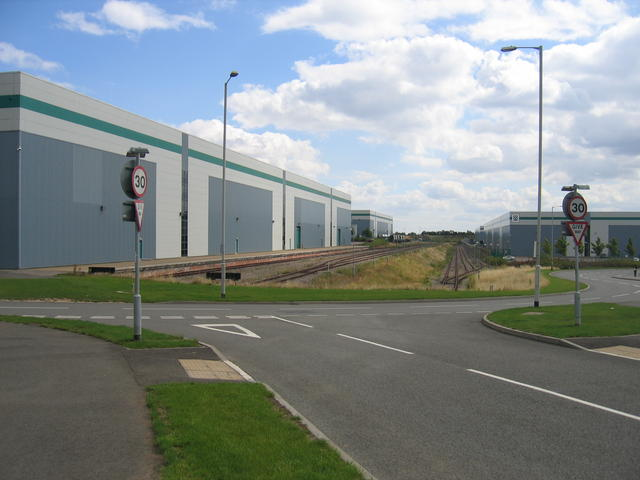
Warehouses developed on Prologis Park, a distribution park built on the site of the former Coventry Colliery. The site retains its connection to the UK National Rail Network via Network Rail

After British Coal handed the site over to the local authority in 1996, the site was divided into three areas:

- The residual Homefire "smokeless coal" plant
- A country park, called Keresley Park. This also houses the new Keresley Community Centre opened in 1999
- A new distribution park, owned by Prologis

After the closure of the Homefire plant in 2000, that area was also redeveloped as part of the distribution park. Retaining its connection to the national rail network via Network Rail, the site also has road connections to the M6 motorway.

In 2008, a memorial was erected to the former miners of the colliery and workers at the smokeless fuel plant.

In April 2024, Prologis was granted permission to expand the logistics facility an additional 159,000 square feet.

The link road off Wheelwright Lane, which commences next to the level crossing, is named Winding House Lane.

== See also ==
- Daw Mill
- Dexter Colliery
