= Bradley Reserve (Turramurra) =

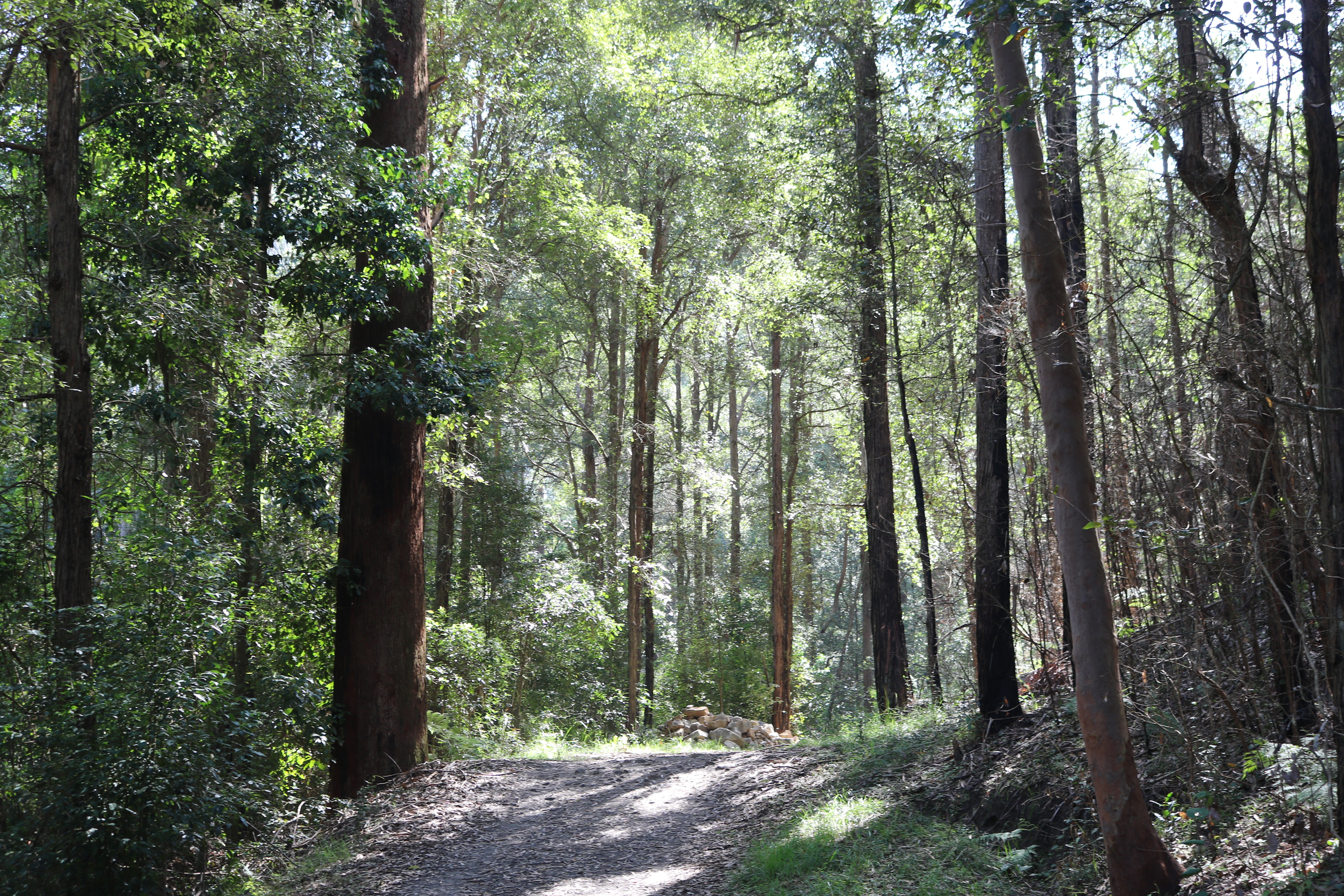
- the Great North Walk with tall Eucalyptus trees

- Coordinates: 33°45′22″S 151°06′16.3″E
- Country: Australia
- State: New South Wales

Bradley Reserve is located 15 km (9 mi) north-west from Sydney. Situated near the suburb of Turramurra and bordering Lane Cove National Park, in the state of New South Wales, Australia.

The reserve contains scenic outlooks, sandstone outcrops, heath, woodlands and tall eucalyptus forest. Tree species include the Blackbutt, Sydney Blue Gum and the Native Crabapple. Recreational activities include bushwalking and birdwatching. The Great North Walk passes through Bradley Reserve.
