= Daimler Halt =

Former railway station in Warwickshire, England

General information
- Location: off Sandy Lane, Coventry; England
- Coordinates: 52.4187°N 1.5144°W
- Grid reference: SP331802
- Platforms: 2

Other information
- Status: Disused

History
- Pre-grouping: London and North Western Railway
- Post-grouping: London, Midland and Scottish Railway

Key dates
- 1917: Opened for workmen
- 1956: Became public station
- 1964: Closed
Location

Daimler Halt was a railway halt in Coventry, England, built by the London and North Western Railway in 1917 and closed in 1964.

It was unusual in that it was built solely for use of employees of the Daimler Company. It became a public station in 1956. There were no station buildings with the exception of rain shelters on the platforms.

Preceding station	Historical railways	Following station
Coundon Road; Line open, station closed	London and North Western Railway; Coventry to Nuneaton Line	Foleshill; Line open, station closed
