= Hawkesbury, Warwickshire =

Coordinates: 52.4585°N 1.4749°W

Hawkesbury
- Village
- Location within Warwickshire
- Area: 0.4741 km^{2} (0.1831 sq mi)
- Population: 2,290 (2021 census)
  - Density: 4,830/km^{2} (12,500/sq mi)
- OS grid reference: SP359847
- District: Nuneaton and Bedworth
- Shire county: Warwickshire
- Region: West Midlands
- Country: England
- Sovereign state: United Kingdom
- Post town: Coventry
- Postcode district: CV6
- Dialling code: 02476
- Police: Warwickshire
- Fire: Warwickshire
- Ambulance: West Midlands
- UK Parliament: North Warwickshire

Hawkesbury or Hawkesbury Village is a village in the Nuneaton and Bedworth district of Warwickshire, England. It lies between Coventry and Bedworth. In 2021 it had a population of 2,290.

== Village ==
Although the area name of Hawkesbury is of Anglo-Saxon origin, the hamlet of Hawkesbury grew up around nearby Hawkesbury Junction, a canal junction where the Oxford Canal meets the Coventry Canal, which became operational in 1803. The area was historically part of the ancient parish of Foleshill. There is a Hawkesbury Hall nearby, which was once owned by the Parrott family, who owned coal mining interests in the area. Historically two collieries operated in the vicinity, both of which are long gone.

The village borders the northernmost edge of Coventry and is separated from the city by a thin stretch of countryside and the M6 motorway, adjacent to Junction 3. It is situated within the Poplar Ward of the Nuneaton and Bedworth Borough Council area, less than 2 miles south of Bedworth town centre, 5 miles south of Nuneaton and 5 miles northwest of central Coventry.

Until around 1999, it consisted of three streets with approximately 140 houses and a population of 250. Housing developments have now increased the number of houses to approximately 740 with an adult population of 1,147.

This specific area has previously been referred to as a number of different locations, including Exhall, Longford, Tackley, Little Bayton and Black Horse Road. Due to these anomalies, it was felt that the area should be given a specific identity.

Towards the start of 2005, contact was made between Nuneaton and Bedworth Borough Council and Warwickshire County Council regarding signage for the area, which is defined as being between the Hawkesbury Lane railway crossing on Black Horse Road, where Hawkesbury Lane station used to be, and the humpback bridge over the Coventry Canal, alongside Hawkesbury Junction, where the Oxford Canal starts.

Following consultation, Warwickshire County Council reached the decision that this area should be known as Hawkesbury Village. The area includes the Moorings Business Park.

In August 2005, the Hawkesbury Village Residents' Association was formed to act as a voice of the community and assist with local issues.
