= Longford and Exhall railway station =

Former railway station in Warwickshire, England

Longford and Exhall

General information
- Location: Woodshires Road, Longford, Coventry; England
- Coordinates: 52.4531°N 1.4904°W
- Grid reference: SP347840
- Platforms: 2

Other information
- Status: Disused

History
- Pre-grouping: London and North Western Railway
- Post-grouping: London, Midland and Scottish Railway

Key dates
- 2 September 1850: Opened
- 23 May 1949: Closed
Location

Longford & Exhall was a small railway station serving the areas of Longford and Exhall, to the north of Coventry, England, on the Coventry to Nuneaton Line, built by the London and North Western Railway. The station was opened in 1850, along with the line, and was the first to be closed, closing on 23 May 1949.

It was located at the point where the railway line crossed over Woodshires Road.

Preceding station	Historical railways	Following station
Foleshill; Line open, station closed	London and North Western Railway; Coventry to Nuneaton Line	Hawkesbury Lane; Line open, station closed
