= Challenge (cycle and car) =

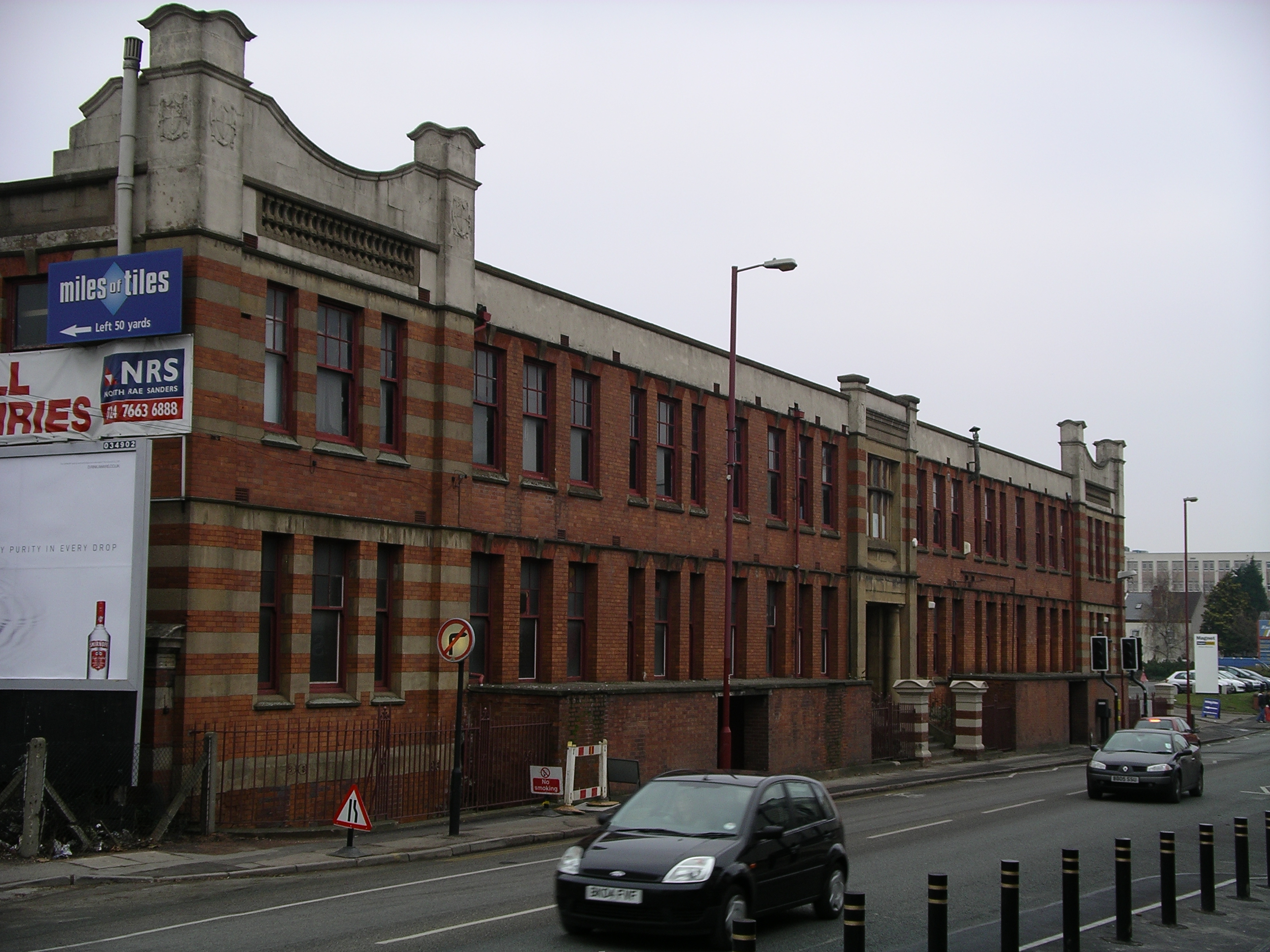
Challenge's former office building (built 1906–7) on Foleshill Road, Coventry. (photo 2007)

Challenge started to make cycles in Foleshill, Coventry, England in 1903; they also made a Challenge light car from about 1912 to 1915. They moved into new premises on Foleshill Road, Coventry around 1906 or 1907, which consisted of an impressive symmetrical red-brick office building with sheds behind. The Edwardian office building still stands today.

The earliest known examples of their work include A 1905 Challenge Motorcycle, and a 1907 No3 Roadster sold by G.W.Rice as "The Surbiton".
