= HMAS Hawkesbury =

Two ships of the Royal Australian Navy (RAN) have been named HMAS Hawkesbury, after the Hawkesbury River in New South Wales.

- HMAS Hawkesbury (K363), a River-class frigate launched in 1943, decommissioned in 1947, recommissioned in 1952, and decommissioned for the second time in 1955
- HMAS Hawkesbury (M 83), a Huon-class minehunter launched in 1998 and commissioned but in reserve as of 2016

== Battle honours ==
Ships named HMAS Hawkesbury are entitled to carry three battle honours:

- Pacific 1944–45
- New Guinea 1944
- Borneo 1945

== See also ==
- HMCS Hawkesbury (K415), a Canadian Flower-class corvette from World War II.
