= Coundon Road railway station =

Former railway station in Warwickshire, England

Coundon Road
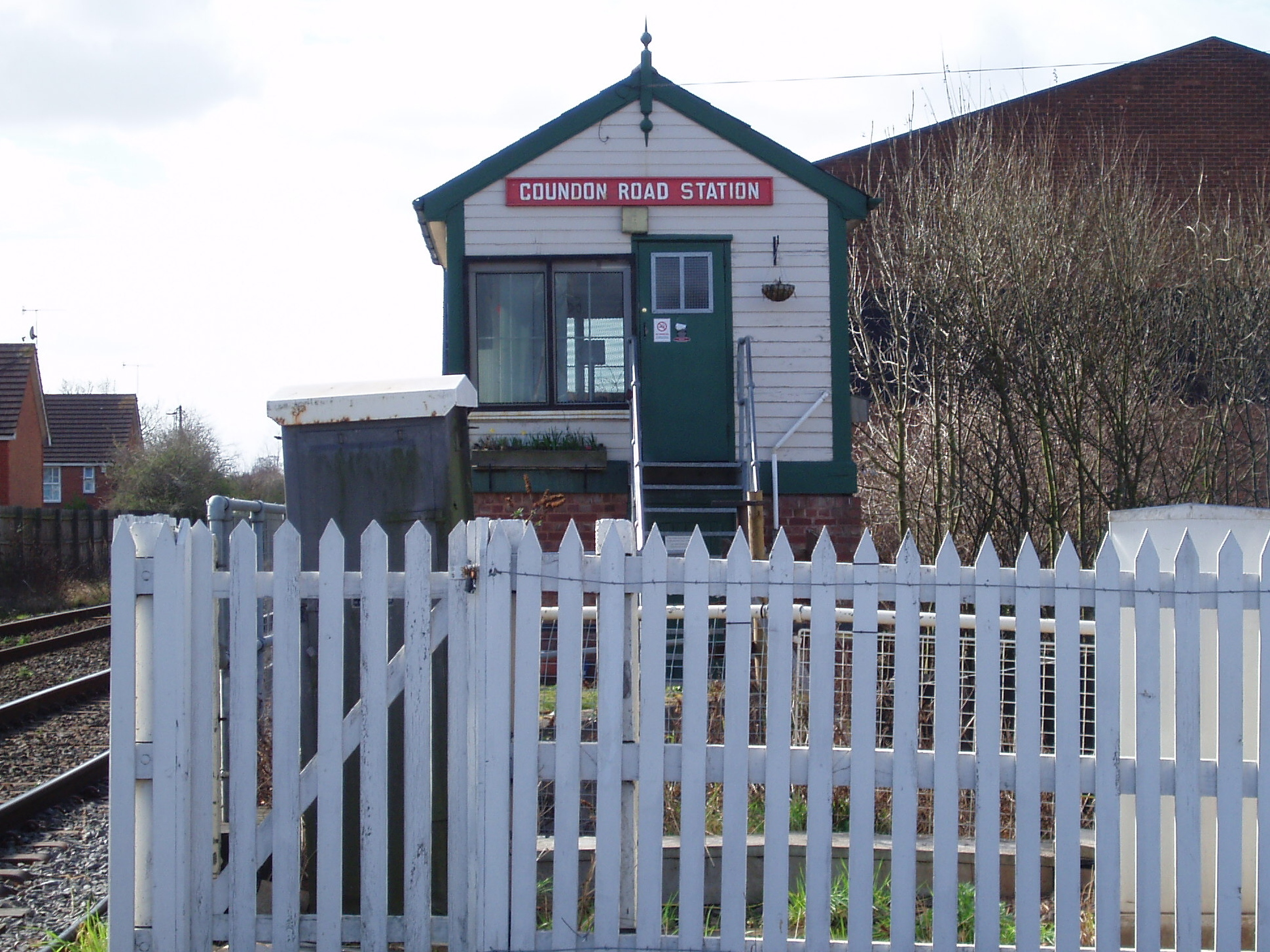
- The signal box in 2008

General information
- Location: Coundon Road, Coventry; England
- Coordinates: 52.4139°N 1.5223°W
- Grid reference: SP325795
- Platforms: 2

Other information
- Status: Disused

History
- Pre-grouping: London and North Western Railway
- Post-grouping: London, Midland and Scottish Railway

Key dates
- 1850: Opened
- 1896: Rebuilt
- 1965: Closed
Location

Coundon Road railway station was a railway station in Coventry, England, built by the London and North Western Railway in 1850. It was the first station north of Coventry on the Coventry to Nuneaton Line, and closed in 1965.

In January 1857, Coundon Road station became the temporary terminus on the route when the nearby Spon End Viaduct collapsed. The station was rebuilt in 1896 after the original station buildings were destroyed by fire.

The Up (Coventry) platform and station master's house can still clearly be seen, with the house now part of Bablake School's site as their Classics block. The Down (Nuneaton) platform is also in situ, although with its platform edging now removed.

A bid was made to the Restoring Your Railway Fund in March 2020 for funding for a feasibility study into reopening the station. The bid was not successful.

== Signal box ==
Also on the site at Coundon Road was the 1876 LNWR signal box, which controlled the level crossing gates and signals. The signal box closed on 23 May 2009 as part of the Coventry - Nuneaton line resignalling project, whereby the control of the level crossing and signalling passed to the West Midlands Signalling Centre, Birmingham. The signal box was finally demolished in the early hours of Sunday 26 January 2014, almost five years after signalling its last train.

Preceding station	Historical railways	Following station
Coventry; Line and station open	London and North Western Railway; Coventry to Nuneaton Line	Daimler Halt; Line open, station closed
