= GWR 1500 Class =

Great Western Railway steam locomotive

Great Western Railway 1500 Class
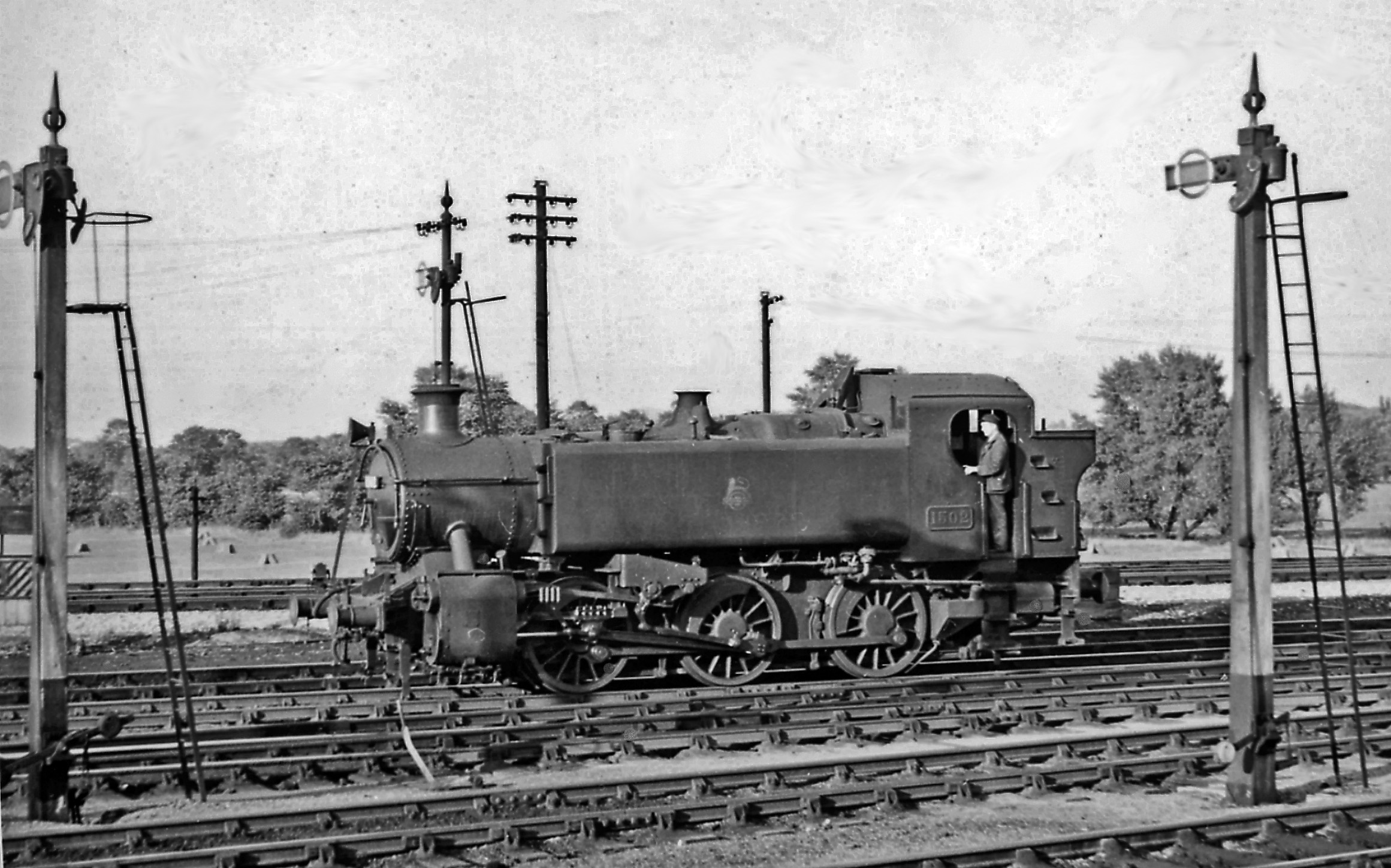
- No. 1502 at Didcot 1957
Type and origin
- Power type: Steam
- Designer: Frederick Hawksworth
- Builder: Swindon Works
- Order number: Lot 373
- Build date: 1949
- Total produced: 10
Specifications
- Configuration
  - Whyte: 0-6-0PT
  - UIC: Ch2tg
- Gauge: 4 ft 8 1/2 in (1,435 mm) standard gauge
- Driver dia.: 4 ft 7 1/2 in (1.410 m)
- Minimum curve: 3 1/2 chains (231 ft; 70 m)
- Wheelbase: 12 ft 10 in (3.91 m)
- Loco weight: 58 long tons 4 cwt (130,400 lb or 59.1 t) (62.9 short tons)
- Fuel type: Coal
- Boiler: GWR Standard No. 10
- Boiler pressure: 200 lbf/in^{2} (1.4 MPa)
- Cylinders: Two, outside
- Cylinder size: 17.5 in × 24 in (444 mm × 610 mm)
- Valve gear: Walschaerts
- Valve type: piston valves
Performance figures
- Tractive effort: 22,515 lbf (100.15 kN)
Career
- Operators: British Railways, National Coal Board
- Power class: GWR: C BR: 4F
- Numbers: 1500–1509
- Axle load class: GWR: Red
- Locale: Western Region
- Withdrawn: BR: 1959–1963, NCB: 1970
- Disposition: One preserved, remainder scrapped

The Great Western Railway (GWR) 1500 Class is a class of 0-6-0PT type steam locomotive. Despite being a GWR Hawksworth design, all ten (nos 1500–1509) were completed under the administration of the Western Region of British Railways in 1949, just after Nationalisation.

== Overview ==
Coming from a railway company with a well-developed standardisation policy, the 15xx was an unconventional break. Unlike almost all previous panniers they had outside cylinders, Walschaerts valve gear, and a very short wheelbase of 12 ft 10 in (3.91 m) to go round curves of 3.5 chains (231 ft; 70 m). Above footplate level they were very similar to the 9400 class, and shared the same Standard No. 10 boiler. The major difference was below the (very small) footplate, where they resembled the USATC S100 Class that the GWR and other railways had used during the Second World War.

Although a functional design, the class had limited usefulness as they were route-restricted by their high weight and were unsuitable for fast running because of their short wheelbase. Largely confined to empty stock workings at London Paddington station, their lives were short; for example 1509 lasted barely ten years in BR service. Four of the class, 1506 to 1509, were based in Wales, Newport Pill, Ebbw Junction & Cardiff Canton, 1508 was withdrawn from that last shed. Like the 1600 and 9400 classes, their construction now appears to have been of doubtful value.

The onset of dieselisation and the decline in traffic on the railway network meant the 1500s were withdrawn and scrapped while still in workable condition. However No. 1501 has seen regular use at the Severn Valley Railway in preservation, much longer than its life in BR ownership.

Year	Quantity in service at start of year	Quantity withdrawn	Locomotive number(s)
1959	10	1	1509
1960	9	0	–
1961	9	2	1501-2
1962	7	2	1505/8
1963	5	5	1500/3-4/6-7

== Preservation ==
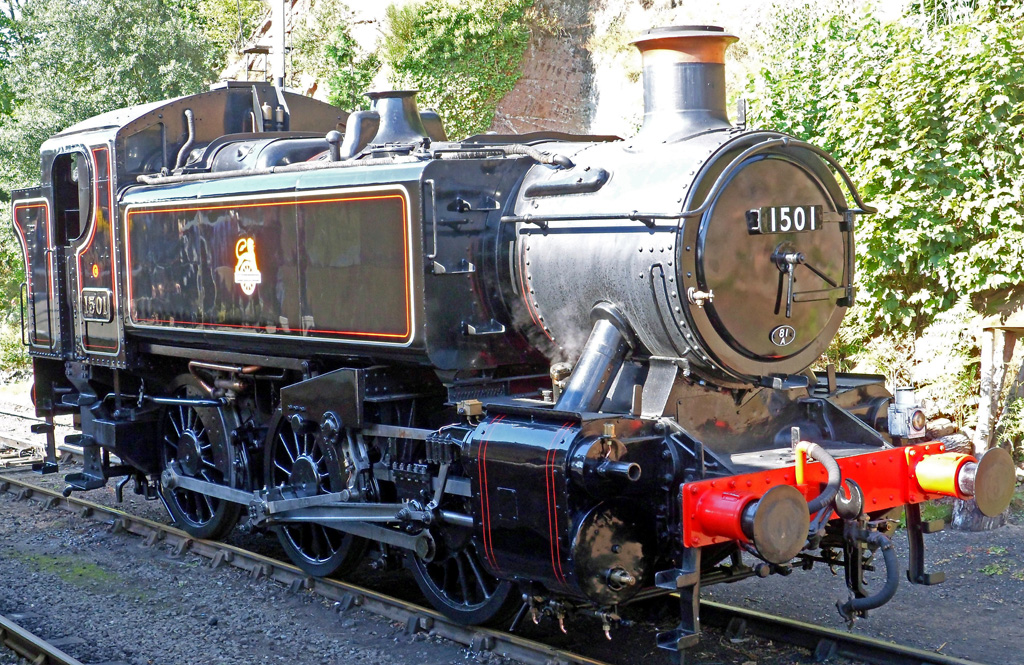
1501 after restoration in 2012 and wearing the early BR lined black scheme

1501 was one of the first of the class to be withdrawn in 1961, but was sold along with 1502 and 1509 to the National Coal Board for use at Coventry Colliery. The three locos were sent to Andrew Barclay Sons & Co., in Kilmarnock, Scotland for overhaul before delivery to the NCB. All three locomotives were purchased in 1970 by the Severn Valley Railway. Locomotives 1502 and 1509 were used as sources of spares for the restoration of 1501. The remains of 1502 and 1509 were scrapped at Cashmore's, Great Bridge in October 1970.

In 2006 No. 1501's boiler certificate expired and it was withdrawn from traffic. The locomotive was overhauled and steamed again in August 2012. It was repainted in British Railways lined black colour scheme with the early BR emblem on its tanks, a livery not normally used on shunting locomotives but carried by classmates 1501 and 1503 while at Old Oak Common. It was withdrawn from service again at the start of 2023 and will require a full overhaul before any further use.

== See also ==
- GWR 0-6-0PT – list of classes of GWR 0-6-0 pannier tank, including table of preserved locomotives
