= Foleshill railway station =

Former railway station in Warwickshire, England

Foleshill

General information
- Location: Lockhurst Lane, Holbrooks, Coventry; England
- Coordinates: 52.4332°N 1.5049°W
- Grid reference: SP337817
- Platforms: 2

Other information
- Status: Disused

History
- Pre-grouping: London and North Western Railway
- Post-grouping: London, Midland and Scottish Railway

Key dates
- 2 September 1850: Opened
- 18 January 1965: Closed
Location

Foleshill railway station was a railway station in Foleshill, Coventry, England, built by the London and North Western Railway on the Coventry to Nuneaton Line. The railway station was located in the northern part of Coventry, approximately 3 miles from the city centre, on the northern end of Lockhurst Lane in Holbrooks.

There are a few remnants of the old station, all that can be seen is the remains of one of the platforms and the railway line is still in use by both goods and passenger trains. The station was located directly to the north of the Lockhurst Lane road bridge across the railway. The station also had a signal box located on the down line just to the south of the station immediately before the road bridge, right at the foot of the pedestrian stairs off Lockhurst Lane down to Holbrooks Lane.

Labour Members of Warwickshire County Council have raised the prospect of the station reopening.

A bid was made to the Restoring Your Railway Fund in March 2020 for funding for a feasibility study into reopening the station. The bid was not successful.

In 2023, Transport for West Midlands (TfWM) and the West Midlands Rail Executive (WMRE) put forward plans to reopen the station.

Preceding station	Historical railways	Following station
Daimler Halt; Line open, station closed	London and North Western Railway; Coventry to Nuneaton Line	Longford and Exhall; Line open, station closed
