= Coventry–Nuneaton line =

Railway line in the UK

Coventry to Nuneaton Line
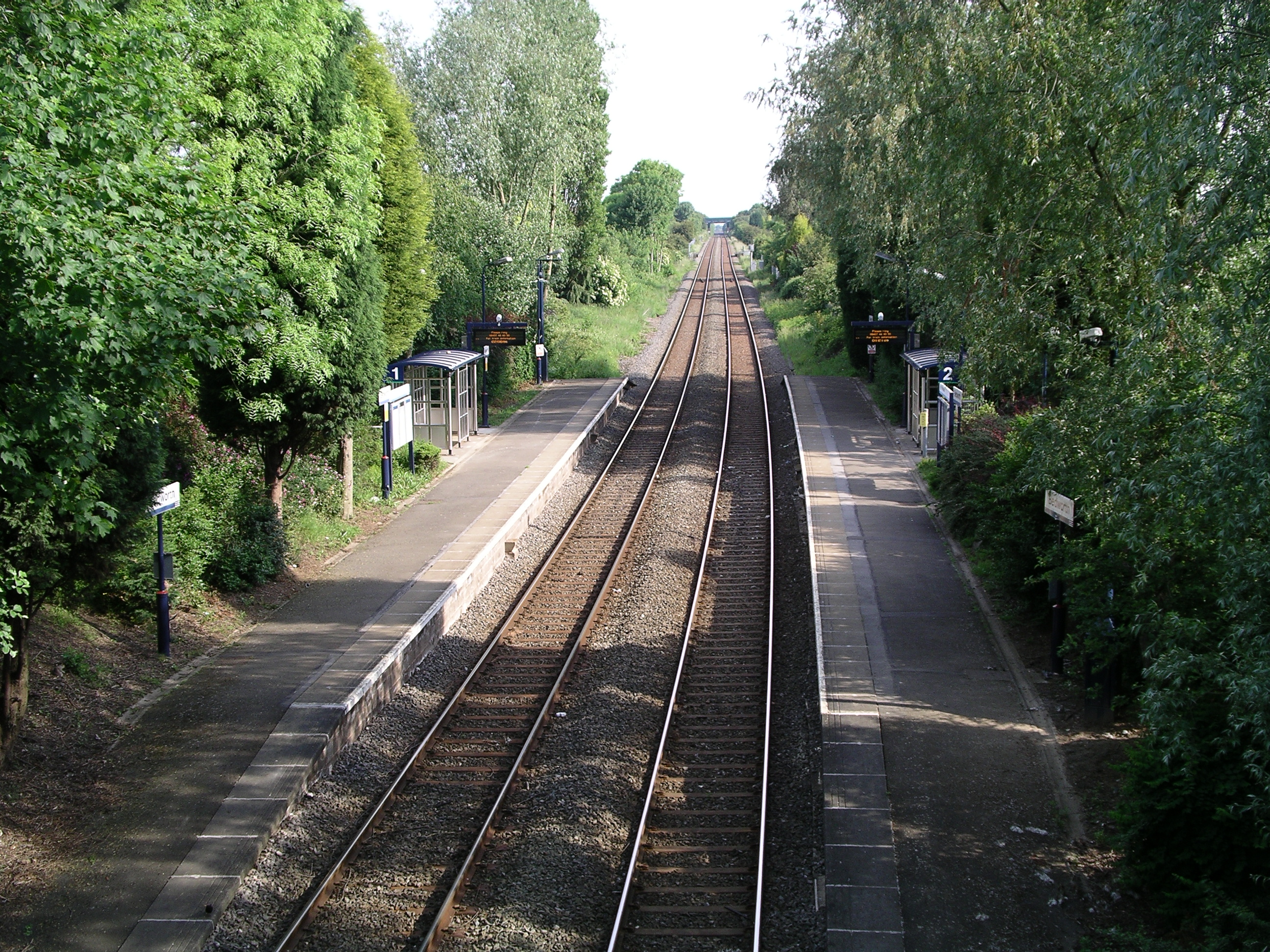
- Bedworth railway station

Overview
- Status: Operational
- Owner: Network Rail
- Locale: Warwickshire; Coventry; West Midlands (region)
- Termini: Nuneaton; Coventry
- Stations: 5

Service
- Type: Commuter rail, Rail freight
- System: National Rail
- Operator: West Midlands Trains
- Rolling stock: Class 172; Class 196

History
- Opened: 1850

Technical
- Line length: 10 miles 15 chains
- Number of tracks: 2
- Track gauge: 4 ft 8 1/2 in (1,435 mm) standard gauge
Route map
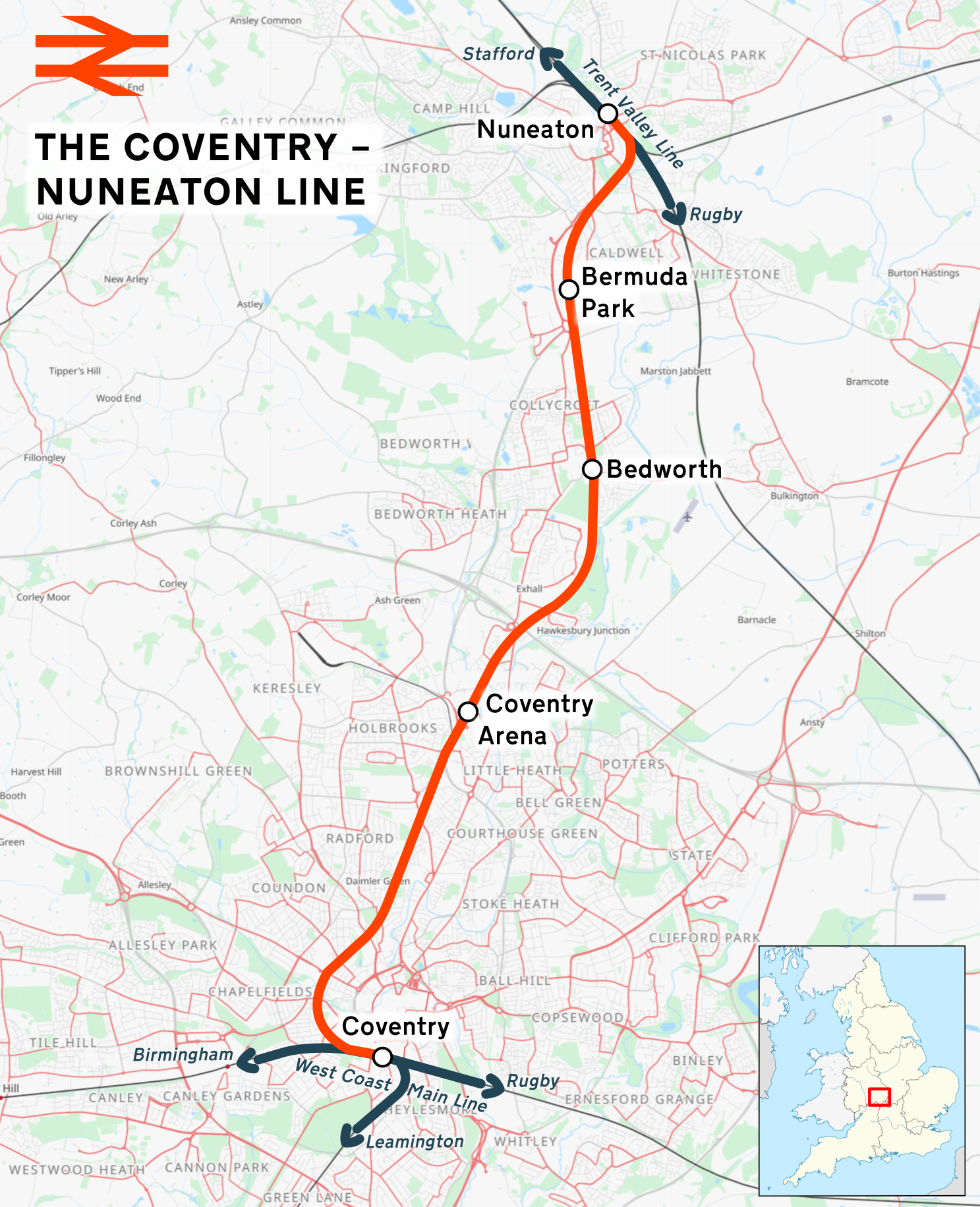
(Click to expand)

The Coventry to Nuneaton Line is a railway line linking Coventry and Nuneaton in the West Midlands of England. The line has a passenger service. It is also used by through freight trains, and freight trains serving facilities on the route.

The current passenger stations on the route are Nuneaton, Bermuda Park, Bedworth, Coventry Arena and Coventry. Freight services run to Bedworth Murco Oil Terminal and Prologis Park Industrial Estate. The line has previously served many other small stations and now-closed goods yards.

Until 2016, the only intermediate station on the route was Bedworth. On 14 December 2011, the UK Government announced an £18.8 million project to upgrade the line, which included new stations at the Ricoh Arena and Bermuda Park (opened January 2016), lengthening of the platforms at Bedworth, and increasing the service frequency from hourly to half-hourly.

The line is currently not electrified, but it was proposed to electrify it at 25 kV AC overhead as part of the Electric Spine scheme. This part of the scheme has been scrapped with other electrification projects.

== Services ==
All passenger services on the line are operated by West Midlands Trains who run an hourly service in each direction between Nuneaton and Leamington Spa via Coventry and Kenilworth, since 2023 this service has been branded as the Elephant & Bear Line. In July 2016 it was announced that a prototype three coach Class 230 unit, would be trialled on the line for an initial period of 12 months. The unit consists of three rebuilt carriages of a former London Underground D78 Stock train. After the prototype unit caught fire in December 2016, it was announced in January 2017 that the planned trial had been cancelled.

Freight trains also use the line, travelling from the Chiltern Main Line via Leamington Spa, heading towards the West Coast Main Line.

== History ==
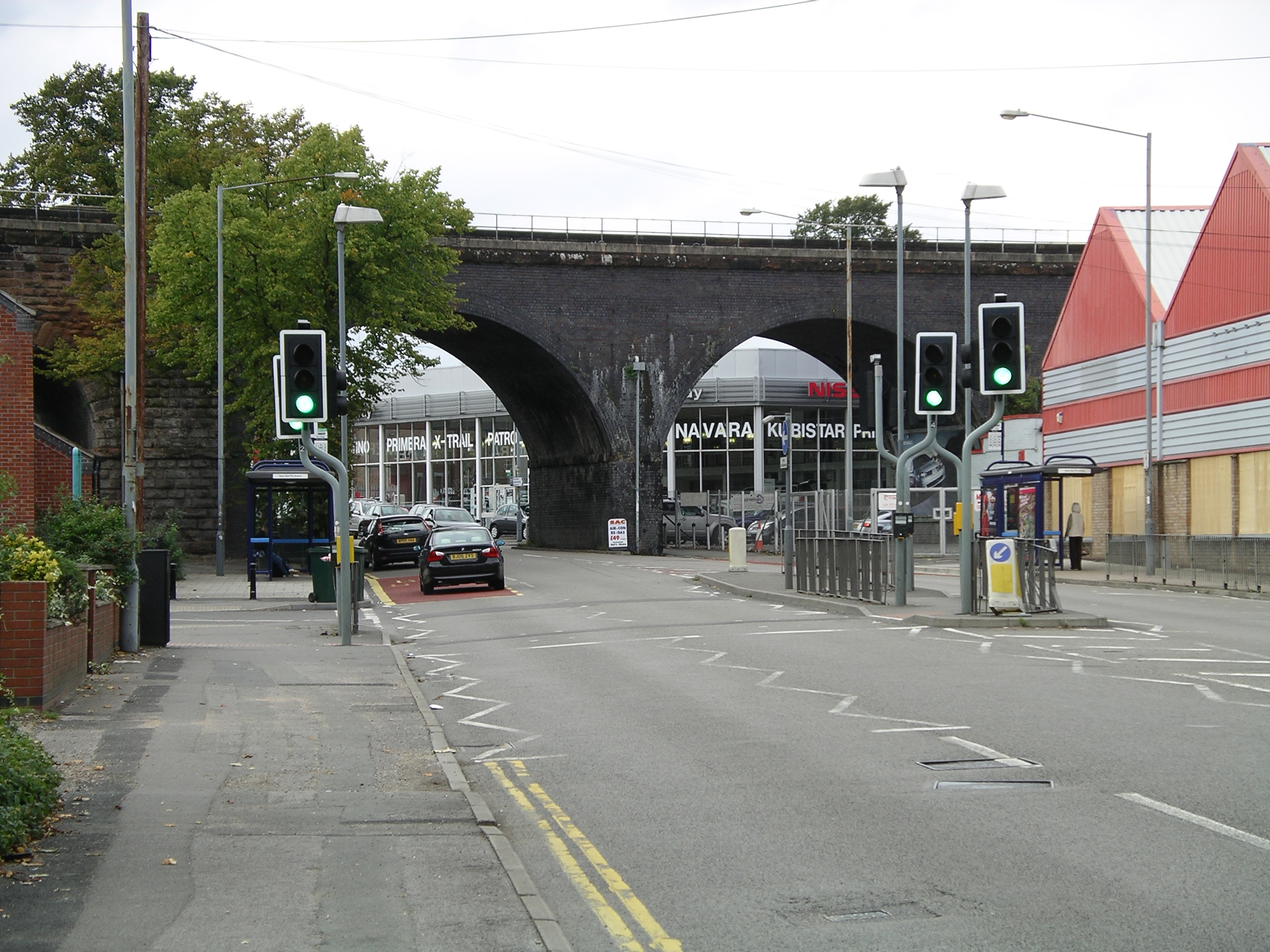
The replacement Spon End Viaduct

The line was built for the London and North Western Railway and was opened on 2 September 1850.

On 26 January 1857, 23 of the 28 arches of the Spon End Viaduct collapsed, due to poor quality construction. This meant trains travelling south terminated at Coundon Road while the viaduct was rebuilt. This took three and a half years to complete and services to Coventry were restored on 1 October 1860.

The line originally had intermediate stations at Coundon Road, Foleshill, Longford and Exhall, Hawkesbury Lane, Bedworth and Chilvers Coton. In 1855 a station was constructed at Radford Road but was never opened and was later demolished. In 1917, Daimler Halt was opened between Coundon Road and Foleshill. But this was a private halt for the use of workers at the adjacent Daimler factory, and was not accessible to the general public. There were also various branches and sidings running from the line to serve local coal mines and factories, the longest of which was the 'Coventry Loop Line' (see below)

The line came under the ownership of the London, Midland and Scottish Railway (LMS) in 1923, and then British Railways in 1948. The little-used Longford and Exhall station was closed in 1949. All of the other intermediate stations were closed on 18 January 1965 (along with those on the Coventry to Leamington Line) when passenger services were withdrawn as a consequence of The Reshaping of British Railways report. Following this, the line became freight-only for the next 22 years.

British Rail restored passenger services to the line on 11 May 1987, under the Speller Act. Initially there were no intermediate stations on the re-opened line until 16 May 1988 when the rebuilt Bedworth station was opened.

=== Coventry Loop Line ===
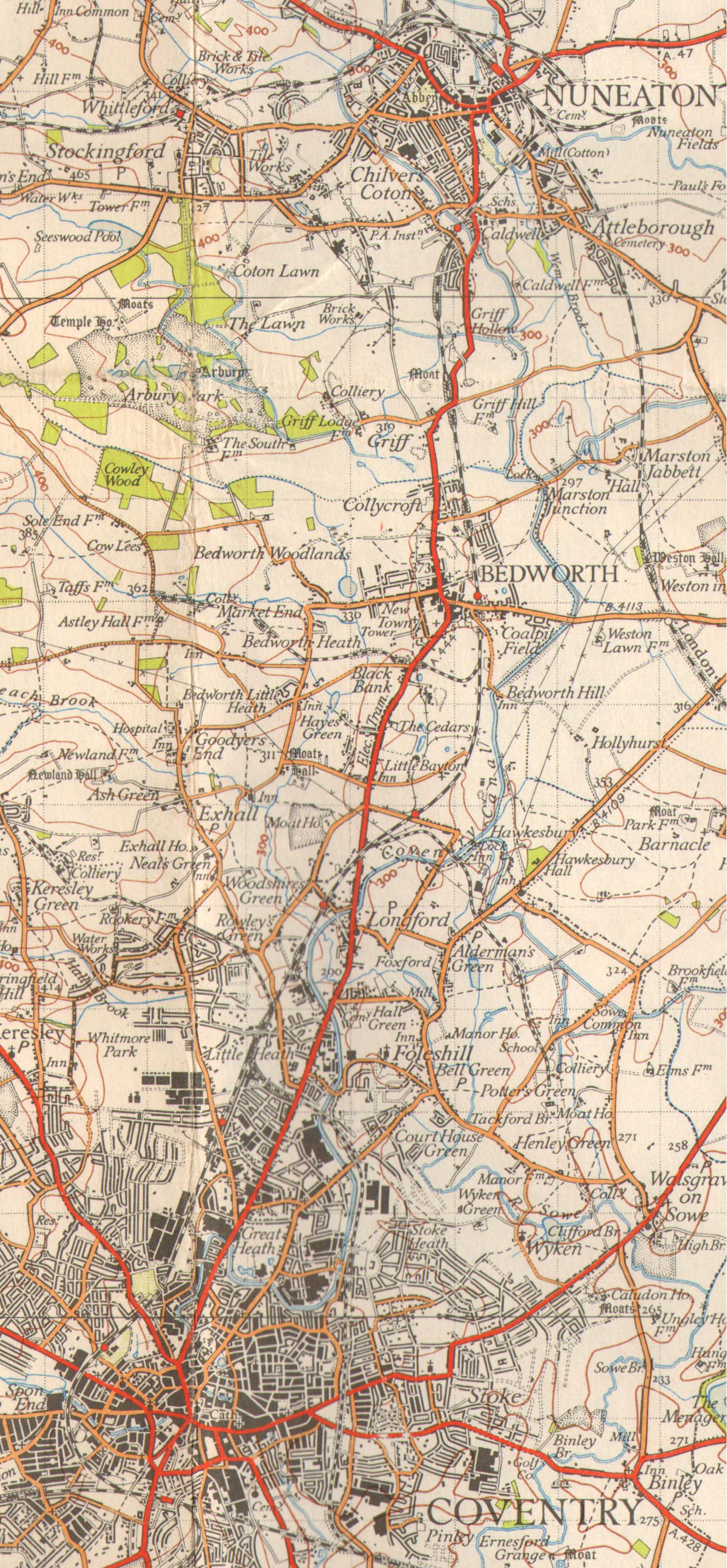
1946 Ordnance Survey map of the Coventry and Nuneaton area. The line and its various branches can be seen.

The Coventry Loop Line was a freight-only branch which ran from Three Spires Junction on the Coventry–Nuneaton Line to Humber Road Junction on the Coventry–Rugby Line. The line was built so freight trains could avoid running through Coventry station, and was first opened in 1914. It had two goods stations at Bell Green and Gosford Green, as well as a number of sidings serving local industries, but never had any scheduled passenger service, although passenger trains occasionally used the line as a diversionary route during engineering works.

Humber Road Junction was closed in 1963, after goods traffic dwindled, and so the branch became a long siding from Three Spires Junction. The last traffic to the Chrysler factory ended in 1981, and the rest of the branch closed in September that year. The track was lifted in 1982. Much of the former trackbed of the line has since been built over as part of the A444 Phoenix Way.

=== 2016 station openings ===
The line runs near to the Coventry Building Society Arena stadium on the northern edge of Coventry. Funding for two new stations, Coventry Arena and Bermuda Park, was approved in December 2011. New plans will also see the number of carriages increased from 1 to 3 and the service upgraded to half hourly, a new platform built at Coventry station and also future extensions of the line to Kenilworth and Leamington Spa. After the completion of the Electric Spine project, such a service would be operated by electric multiple units.

Work on building the stations started in October 2014 with the stations opening on 18 January 2016,

=== Service upgrade ===
From 19 May 2019, services on the Coventry to Nuneaton route have been significantly upgraded by West Midlands Trains, with the single-car Class 153s replaced by 2-car Class 172 units. Saturdays (which will coincide with games at the Coventry Building Society Arena) will see three trains per hour in each direction. The line is also connected with the Coventry to Leamington Spa line, with direct trains from Nuneaton to Leamington Spa. In December 2021 West Midlands Trains once again declared their failure to run services on the line, as well as the Coventry–Leamington line, until at least the end of January 2022. This followed their failure in early 2021 to maintain a service.

== Future proposals ==
In 2019 a report by Midlands Connect proposed reinstating direct services between Coventry and Leicester, for the first time since 2004, by reinstating a "dive under" under the West Coast Main Line at Nuneaton, connecting the Coventry-Nuneaton line to the Nuneaton-Leicester line. Currently this journey is only possible by changing at Nuneaton.

In 2023, Transport for West Midlands (TfWM) and the West Midlands Rail Executive (WMRE) put forward plans to reopen Foleshill railway station.

== See also ==
- Coventry to Leamington line
