= Hawkesbury Junction =

Canal junction in Warwickshire, England

Coordinates: 52.4579°N 1.4690°W

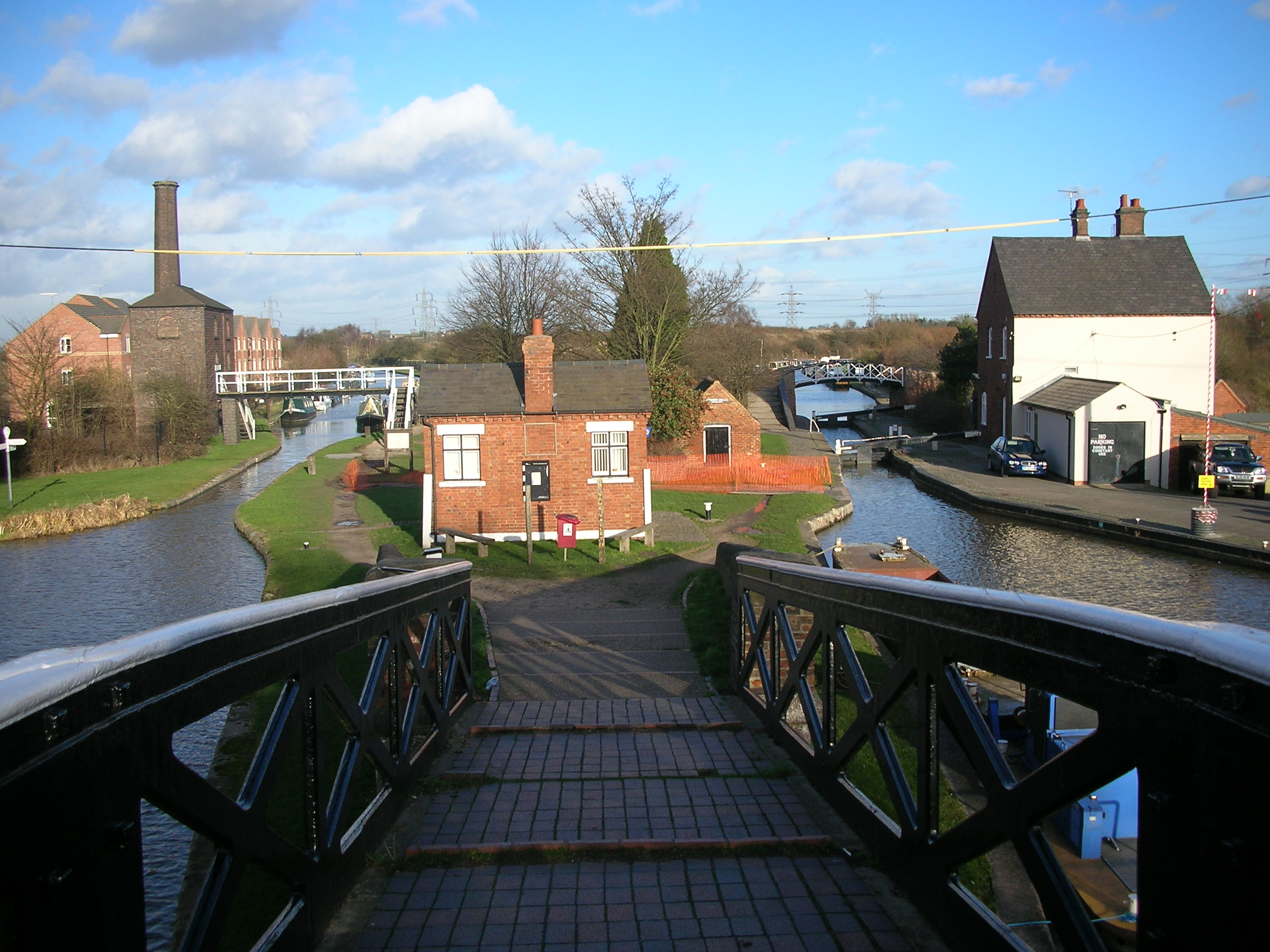
- The engine house and Coventry Canal on the left, with the Oxford Canal on the right
- Interactive map of Hawkesbury Junction

Specifications
- Status: Open
- Navigation authority: Canal and River Trust

History
- Date completed: 1803

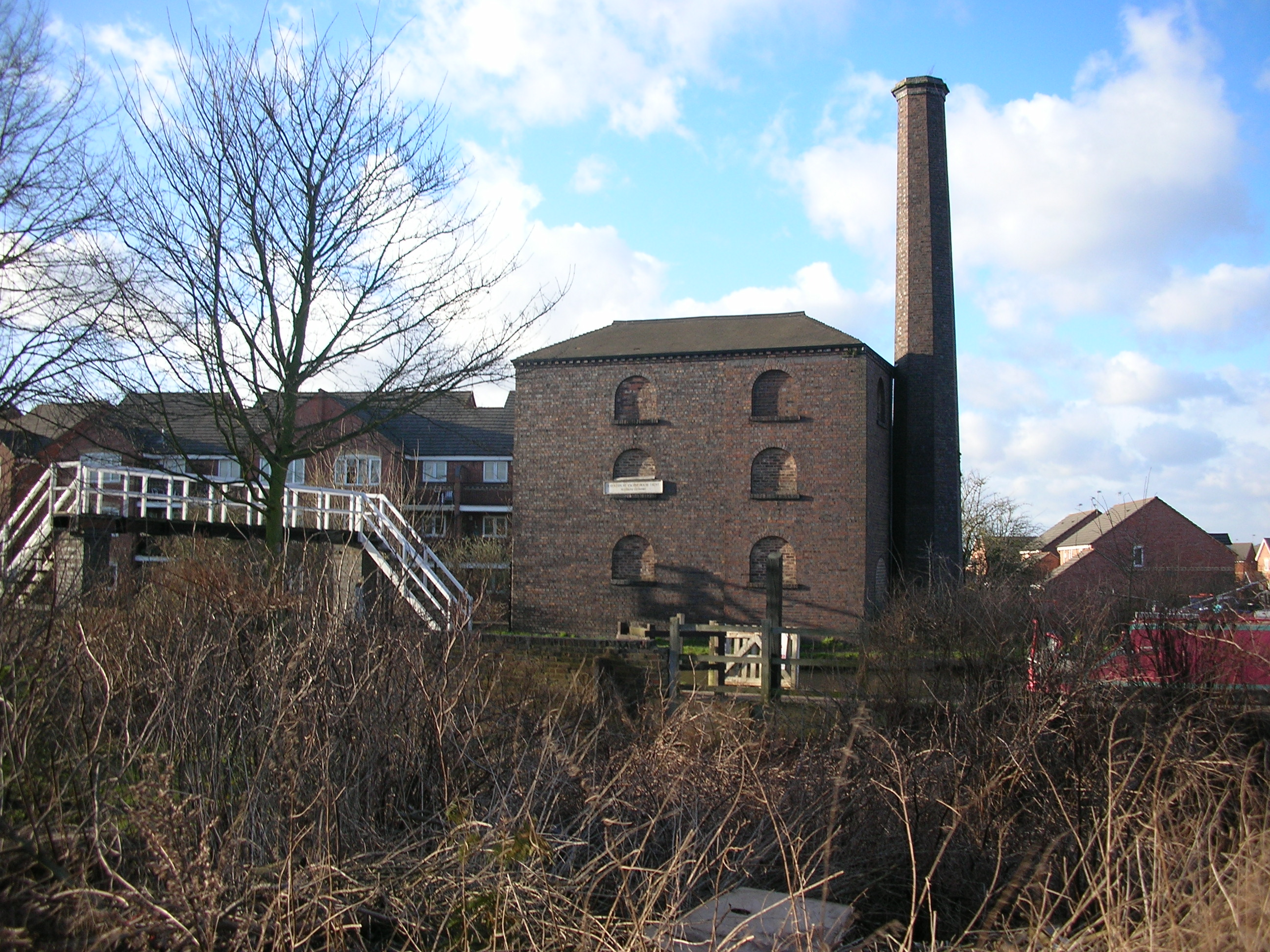
Engine house at the junction, on the Coventry Canal

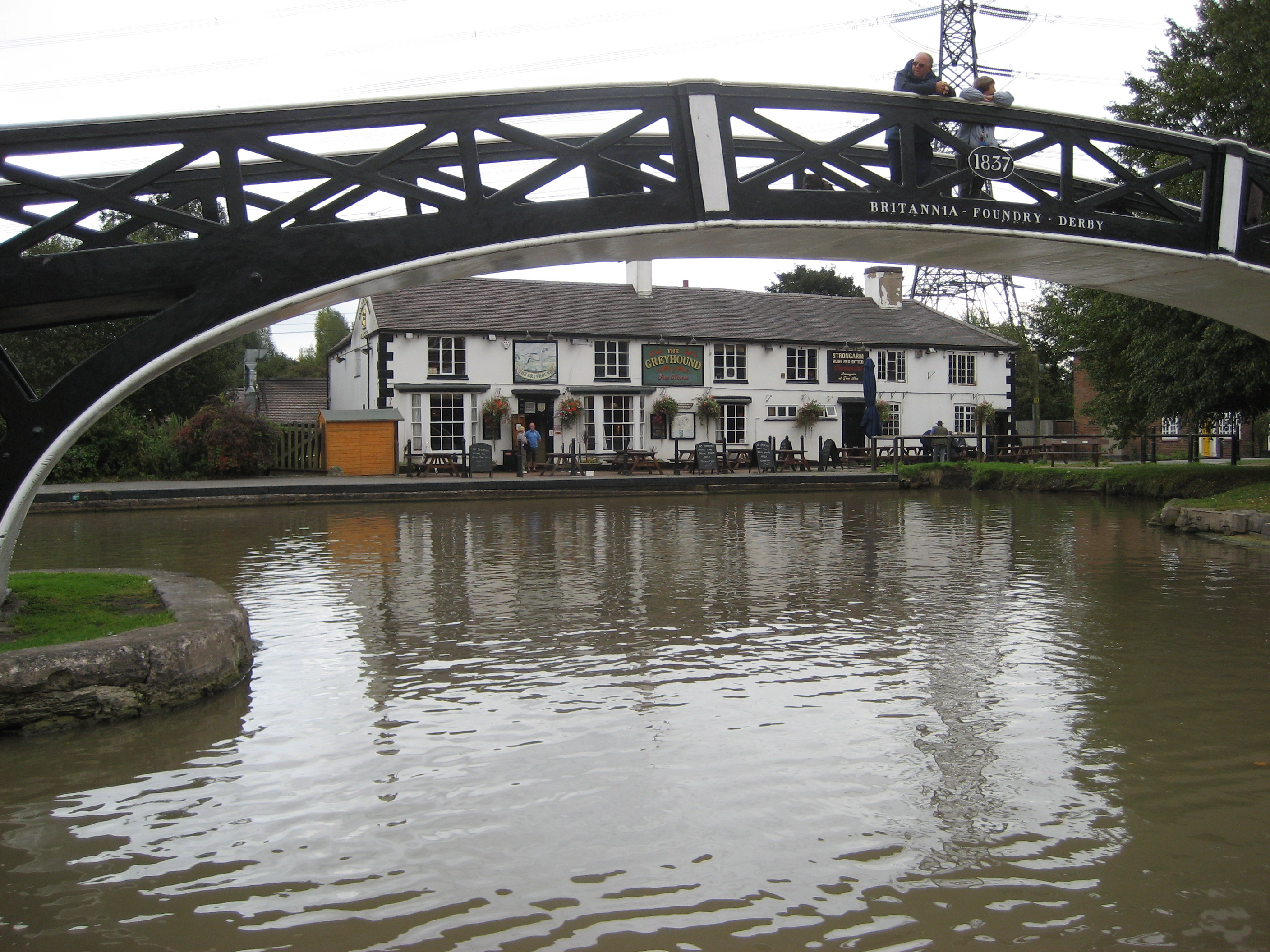
Hawkesbury Junction viewed from the Coventry Canal looking towards the Oxford Canal

Hawkesbury Junction or Sutton Stop (grid reference SP360846) is a canal junction in England, at the northern limit of the Oxford Canal where it meets the Coventry Canal, near Hawkesbury Village, Warwickshire, between Bedworth and Coventry. The alternative name, Sutton Stop, arises from the name of a family which provided several lock keepers there in the nineteenth century.

== History ==
=== 18th-century origins ===
The Coventry Canal was authorised by an act of Parliament, the Coventry Canal Act 1768 (8 Geo. 3. c. 36), and although the long term aim was to link Coventry to the Grand Trunk Canal (later called the Trent and Mersey Canal), the first priority was to reach the coalfields at Bedworth, so that coal could be shipped to Coventry. The first 10 miles (16 km) were completed in 1769, and coal traffic proved profitable. The Oxford Canal was authorised in that year by the Oxford Canal Act 1769 (9 Geo. 3. c. 70), and was built as a contour canal by James Brindley, which made it rather inefficient for the transport of goods. Brindley died in 1772, and the line from Coventry to Banbury was completed by Samuel Simcock in 1778.

The junction between the canals was the source of great controversy. The Oxford Canal Act 1769 contained clauses which stipulated that both companies had the right to the tolls on the other's canal for certain traffic which passed between them. Thus the tolls for all coal traffic on the first 2 miles (3.2 km) of the Oxford Canal were to go to the Coventry company, while tolls which the Coventry Canal collected for the first 3.5 miles (5.6 km) of travel by all goods except coal which had passed through the junction were to be given to the Oxford company. The junction was originally to be located at Gosford Green, but Brindley changed his mind while the bill was in Parliament, and tried to get the junction moved to Bedworth. This would have deprived the Coventry Canal of tolls on all coal traffic using the Oxford Canal, and so a compromise was reached. Longford was chosen as the site for the junction, and the compensation clauses were added to ensure that the Coventry Canal received much the same revenue as it would have done, had the junction been at Gosford. It was a complicated solution, and required both canals to run parallel to one another for some distance.

The Oxford company sought ways to alter the solution. First they tried offering £1,500 to the Coventry Canal, in the hope that the compensation clauses would not be enacted. Then they tried to obtain a second act of Parliament, which would remove the clauses, but this was defeated by opposition from the Coventry Canal and its supporters. Their next tactic was to plan a bypass, which would connect to the Birmingham Canal system, and avoid the need for a junction altogether. This failed, and so they did nothing for two years, but in 1776 made another attempt to reach agreement. They agreed that they would accept the compensation payments if the Coventry Canal completed their line to Fradley Junction within five years. The Coventry company replied by suggesting that if the junction was opened immediately, and trade could only pass between the canals at the junction, they would build their line to Fradley as soon as possible. If they failed to reach Fradley in seven years, no compensation claims would be made until the link was made. The Oxford company then suggested that they should assist the Coventry company to build a canal to the Staffordshire collieries, but the offer was not welcomed.

Finally, the Coventry Canal took legal action. They obtained a mandamus writ from the Court of King's Bench, which compelled the Oxford company to open the junction. The junction was opened on 15 April 1777 at Longford. There was an error in the levels, and whereas a level junction controlled by a stop lock was anticipated, the Oxford Canal was about 7 inches (18 cm) higher, which resulted in it losing water to the Coventry Canal every time the lock was used. The canals ran parallel for 1 mile (1.6 km), costing the boatmen time and the carriers money. Sir Roger Newdigate described the whole thing as "a very troublesome contrivance".

=== 19th century ===
The junction was moved to its present location in 1803. In commercial carrying times, the junction was a major rendezvous for working boats awaiting orders for their next cargo from the many pits in the area.

A stop lock on the Oxford Canal isolates the water levels of the two original canal companies, with the Oxford being a little higher. A disused engine house, built in 1821, stands on the western bank of the Coventry Canal. It originally housed a Newcomen steam engine, which was brought from Griff Colliery, where it had already worked for 100 years, and which was used to pump water from mines in the area to supply the canal.

=== 20th century ===
By 1913, the developing shafts of the Coventry Colliery had reached below the geographical reach of the pump engine. Named Lady Godiva, it was decommissioned in 1913 but left in place, and eventually moved to the Dartmouth Museum in the 1960s, as the Newcomen Memorial Engine. The canal provided an immediate outlet for the colliery's pumped-out water ingress.

== Location ==
From the junction, the Coventry Canal heads to the south-west and is level to Coventry Basin, a distance of 5.5 miles (8.9 km). To the north, it joins the Ashby Canal at Marston Junction, 2.8 miles (4.5 km) away, and the pound is level until the top lock of the Atherstone flight of eleven locks is reached, 11.1 miles (17.9 km) from the junction. The character of the Oxford Canal between the junction and Braunston, where it joins the Grand Union Canal, was completely changed in the 1830s, when the winding bends of Brindley's contour canal were replaced by straight cuts which required embankments, cuttings and aqueducts, but the scheme reduced the distance to Braunston from 36 miles (58 km) to 22 miles (35 km). The canal is level from the stop lock to Hillmorton Locks, 15.3 miles (24.6 km) away. There are three pairs of locks at Hillmorton, as each was duplicated when the canal was straightened, to cope with the volume of traffic.

== See also ==
- List of conservation areas in the West Midlands
- Oxford Canal
- Tooley's Boatyard

== Bibliography ==
- Cumberlidge, Jane (2009). Inland Waterways of Great Britain (8th ed.). Imray Laurie Norie and Wilson. ISBN 978-1-84623-010-3.
- Hadfield, Charles (1970). The Canals of the East Midlands. David & Charles.
- Nicholson (2003). Nicholson Guide Vol 3 - Birmingham & the Heart of England. Harper Collins. ISBN 0-00-713666-8.
- Pearson, Michael (2003). Canal Companion: Oxford and Grand Union (5th ed.). J. M. Pearson & Son (Publishers). ISBN 0-9545383-0-7.
