= Hawkesbury Lane railway station =

Former railway station in Warwickshire, England

Coordinates: 52.460599°N 1.477339°W

Hawkesbury Lane
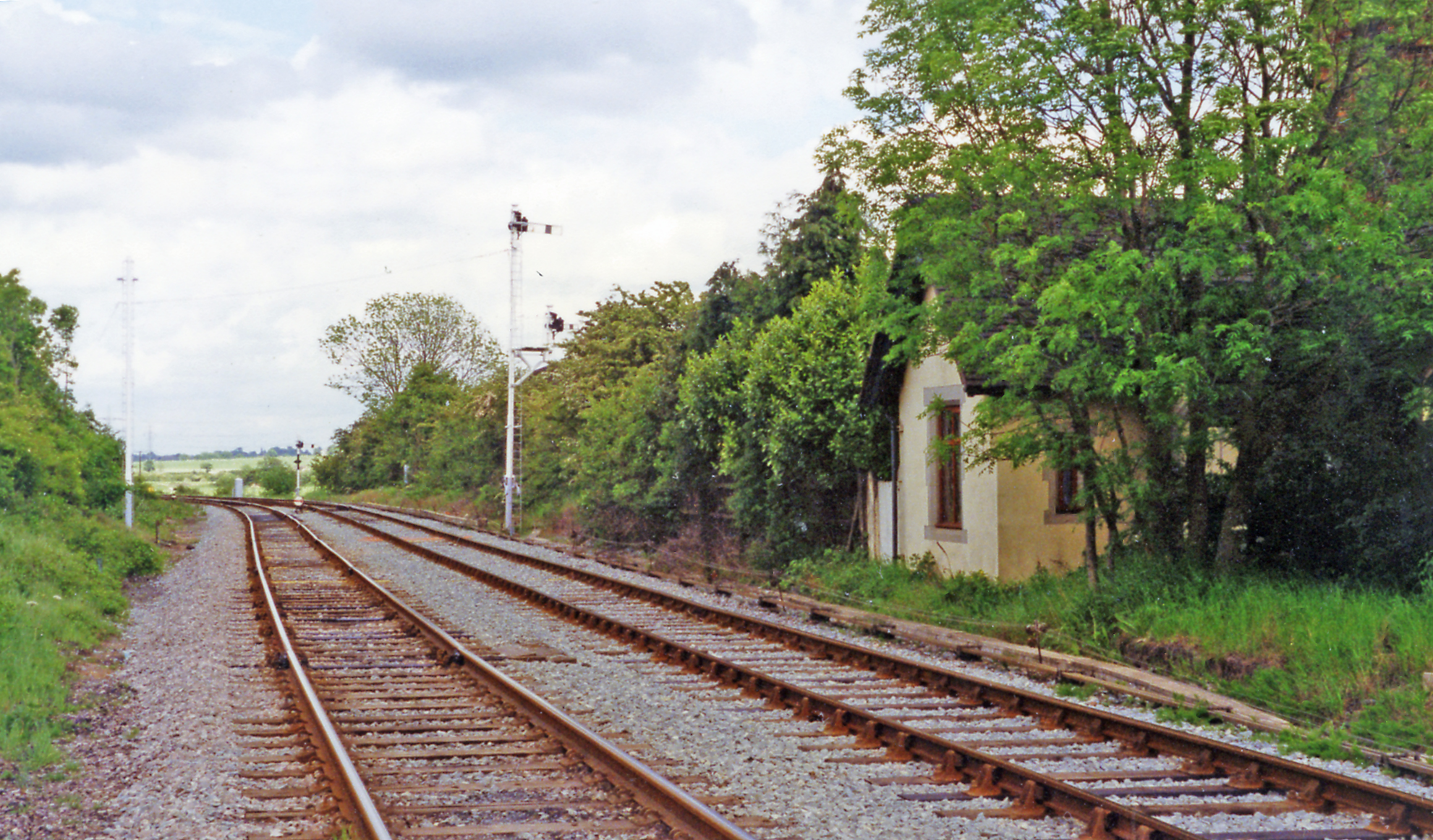
- Site of the station in 1995

General information
- Location: Black Horse Rd, Hawkesbury, Bedworth; England
- Platforms: 2

Other information
- Status: Disused

History
- Pre-grouping: London and North Western Railway

Key dates
- 2 September 1850: Opened
- 18 January 1965: Closed
Location

Hawkesbury Lane was a railway station on the Coventry to Nuneaton Line, which served the village of Hawkesbury, just north of Coventry and south of Bedworth. It opened along with the line in 1850, and was closed in 1965 when passenger services on the route were withdrawn.

The station was located just north of the still existing level crossing on Black Horse Road, and had unusually low platforms.

In a document by West Midlands Rail Executive it was proposed that Hawkesbury could reopen to passengers as part of a long term 30 year strategy for the West Midlands. It was proposed for reopening between 2034 and 2047.

Preceding station	Historical railways	Following station
Longford and Exhall; Line open, station closed	London and North Western Railway; Coventry–Nuneaton line	Bedworth; Line and station open
