= Foleshill =

Suburb in West Midlands, England

Coordinates: 52.42546°N 1.50202°W

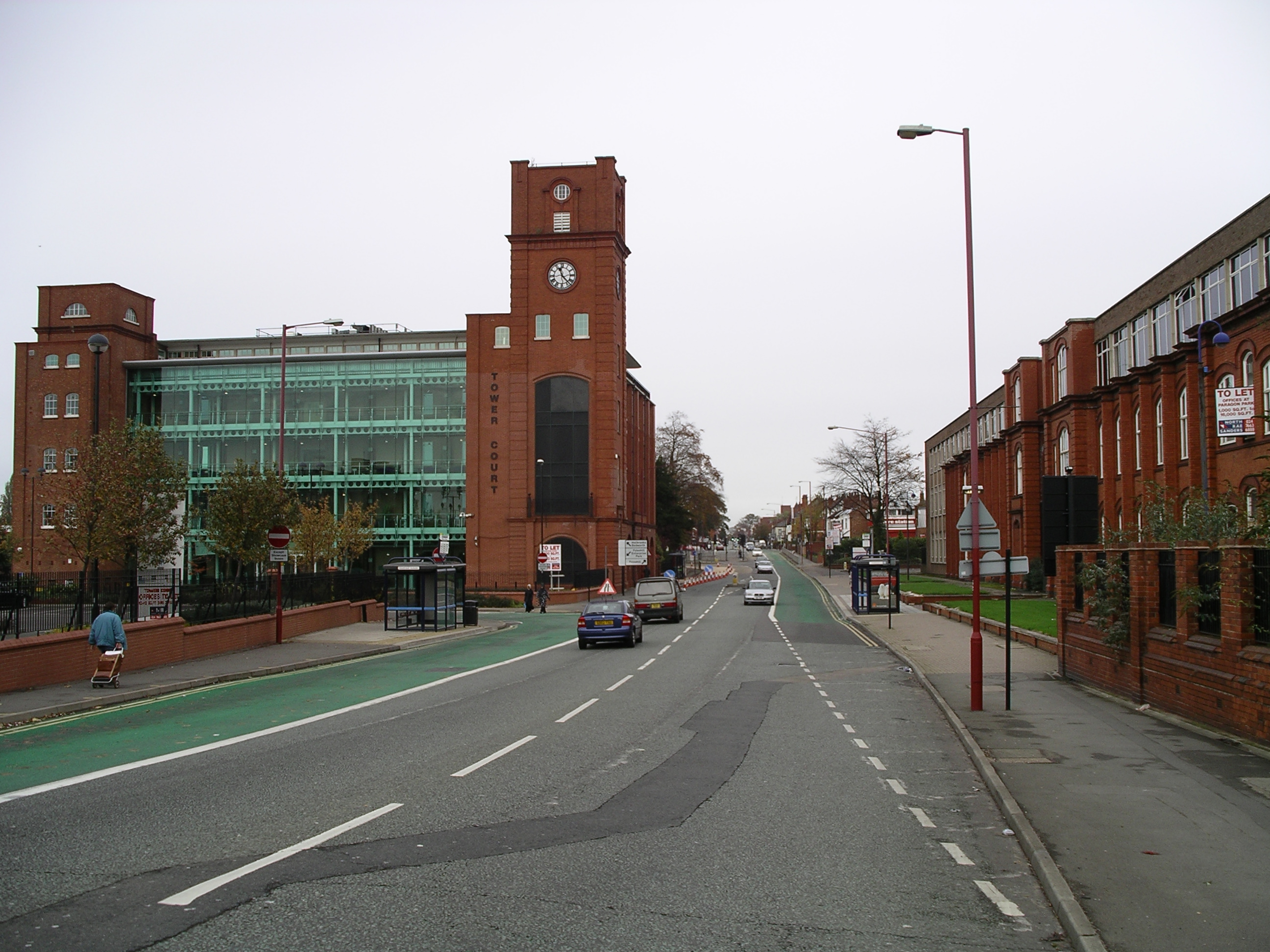
- Tower Court and Foleshill Road, Foleshill

- Location within the West Midlands
- Population: 22,478 (2021 census)
- Metropolitan borough: Coventry
- Metropolitan county: West Midlands
- Region: West Midlands
- Country: England
- Sovereign state: United Kingdom

Foleshill (/ˈfoʊzəl/ FOH-zəl) is a suburb in the north of Coventry, in the county of the West Midlands, England. Longford, Courthouse Green and Rowley Green are to its north and Keresley is to its west. The population of the Ward at the 2021 census was 22,478.

== History ==
Foleshill was originally a village and parish to the north of Coventry, it was mentioned in the Domesday Book of 1086 along with Ansty as part of the estate formerly held by Lady Godiva. The meaning of the name is believed to be derived from 'hill of the folk or people' (Folks Hill). Foleshill was originally part of Warwickshire, but became part of the County of the City of Coventry from 1451 to 1842, when it again became part of Warwickshire. From 1894 to 1932 it was the seat of the Foleshill Rural District. In 1931 the civil parish had a population of 1639. On 1 April 1932 the parish was abolished and merged with Coventry and Bedworth.

Development of industries within the area such as the Ordnance Works, J&J Cash Ltd (silk ribbon weaving), and various brick works; was aided by the existence of the Coventry to Nuneaton railway, (upon which it had a railway station until 1965) and the Coventry Canal.

In July 1905, Courtaulds Ltd opened its factory in Foleshill and grew to become a world leader in the production of artificial fibres, requiring a considerable expansion of the facility over the following years. The now-demolished Courtaulds chimney was reputed to be the tallest in England when it was erected in 1924. It stood 365 feet (111 m) tall, was built on 15 feet (4.5 m) - deep foundations, had a base diameter of 26 feet (8 m) tapering to 16 feet (5 m) at the top, and consisted of 917,000 bricks weighing a total of 4,000 tons (4,064 metric tons). Tower Court, formerly one of the Courtaulds buildings, is now used as offices.

Jaguar Cars had a factory in the area in the 1930s and 1940s. Riley Cars were based in Foleshill from 1916 to 1948, when production was moved to the MG factory in Abingdon, Oxfordshire.

Challenge, an early cycle and car manufacturer, moved into new premises which included an impressive red-brick office building, which can still be seen on Foleshill Road.

The original Coventry and Warwickshire Hospital was built in the mid-1860s in the gothic style and accommodating just 60 beds, which at the time was sufficient for Coventry's requirements. The hospital was extended to cope with the increasing needs of the developing city, and what remained of the original building was destroyed by Luftwaffe bombing during World War II.

The most troubled section of Foleshill is arguably the Pridmore council estate, which has a history of crime including widespread arson and vandalism. In October 2000, plans were unveiled to demolish more than 130 homes in the area. However, when plans for new houses on the site were unveiled in July 2002, it was announced that just 65 new properties would be built there, along with a community centre, shops and a public park. By May 2005, the rehousing was almost complete, and a new housing development has since been completed in the place of the old properties.

The area gained notoriety across the region when on the evening of 29 January 1999 a 22-year-old man, Richard Waring, was fatally shot during a brawl outside the Crow and the Oak public house. In February 2000, local drug dealer Andrew Henson was cleared of murder but found guilty of manslaughter in connection with the shooting and received an eight-year prison sentence. Two other men were cleared.

Filmmaker Michael Moore was proclaimed "Lord Moore of Foleshill" for $8,000 paid with an American Express card as part of a bit in episode 4 of TV Nation.

Foleshill Health Centre, opened in August 2021, is said to be the UK's greenest health centre, specially designed to international Passivhaus sustainability standards. It was constructed in just 25 weeks, using modules designed and manufactured by Portakabin at its manufacturing facility in York. It was at that time one of the most-energy-efficient health buildings in the UK.

== Demography ==
In the post-WW2 period the area acquired a large ethnic minority population. It is now the only one of the 18 wards in Coventry where non-whites form a majority of the population. At the 2011 census, 50.1% of the population were Asian, 30.8% were White, 11% were Black, 3.5% were Mixed. 1.7% were Arab, and 3% belonged to another ethnic group.

As of 2021, in Foleshill West and Foleshill East, white people made up 14.6% and 17.2% of the population respectively and around half of the population were born outside of the UK.

== Religion ==
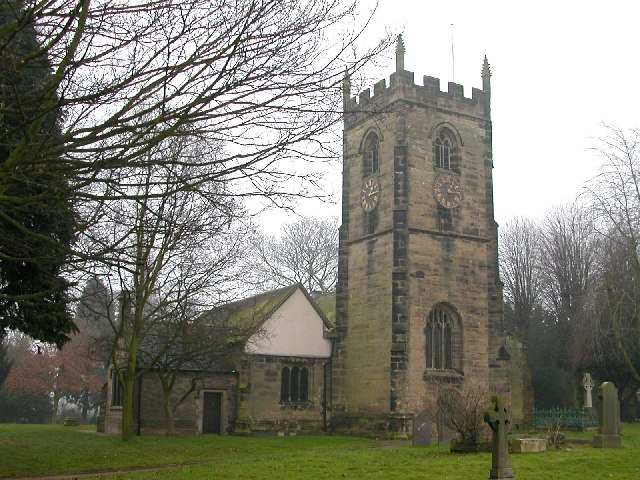
St Laurence's Church, Foleshill.

The Muslim population of Foleshill West and Foleshill East stands at 46.1% and 45.6% respectively.

Religious groups in Foleshill with their own places of worship include:

- St Paul's Church, consecrated in 1842, and rebuilt in 1956 after being struck by an incendiary bomb during the Coventry Blitz.
- St Laurence's Church, a Grade II* listed building with architecture dating from the 15th-19th century. Like St Paul's, it was damaged during the Blitz, requiring extensive repairs.
- Foleshill Road United Reformed Church
- The Church of Pentecost UK
- Foleshill Baptist Church, opened in 1924.
- Foleshill Spiritualist Church, founded in 1907.
- Cornerstone Tamil Church
- Ramgharia Sikh Temple
- Sanatan Dharm Hindu Temple Worship

According to Rev. James Canning, early religious meetings of Sikhs, Hindus and Muslims used the hall of St. Paul's Church as a venue.

The presence of multiple religious groups has been a source of community tension in the past.

== Notable residents ==
- George Eliot (1841–1849), English novelist, poet, journalist, translator and one of the leading writers of the Victorian era
- Tom Mann (1856–1941), father of the trade union movement and co-founder of the Labour Party UK.
- David Dilks (born 1938), historian and professor emeritus of international relations at University of Leeds.
- Surjit Athwal (1971–1998), honour killing victim
