= Hawkesbury River (disambiguation) =

The Hawkesbury River is a river in New South Wales, Australia

It may also refer to:

- Hawkesbury River Railway Bridge
- Hawkesbury River railway station
- Brooklyn Bridge, New South Wales, the local name for the officially named Hawkesbury River Road Bridge, which is adjacent to Peats Ferry Bridge
- Brooklyn, New South Wales, a village in NSW, Australia sometimes referred to as Hawkesbury River and served by the aforementioned station
