= Oxford Canal =

Canal in England

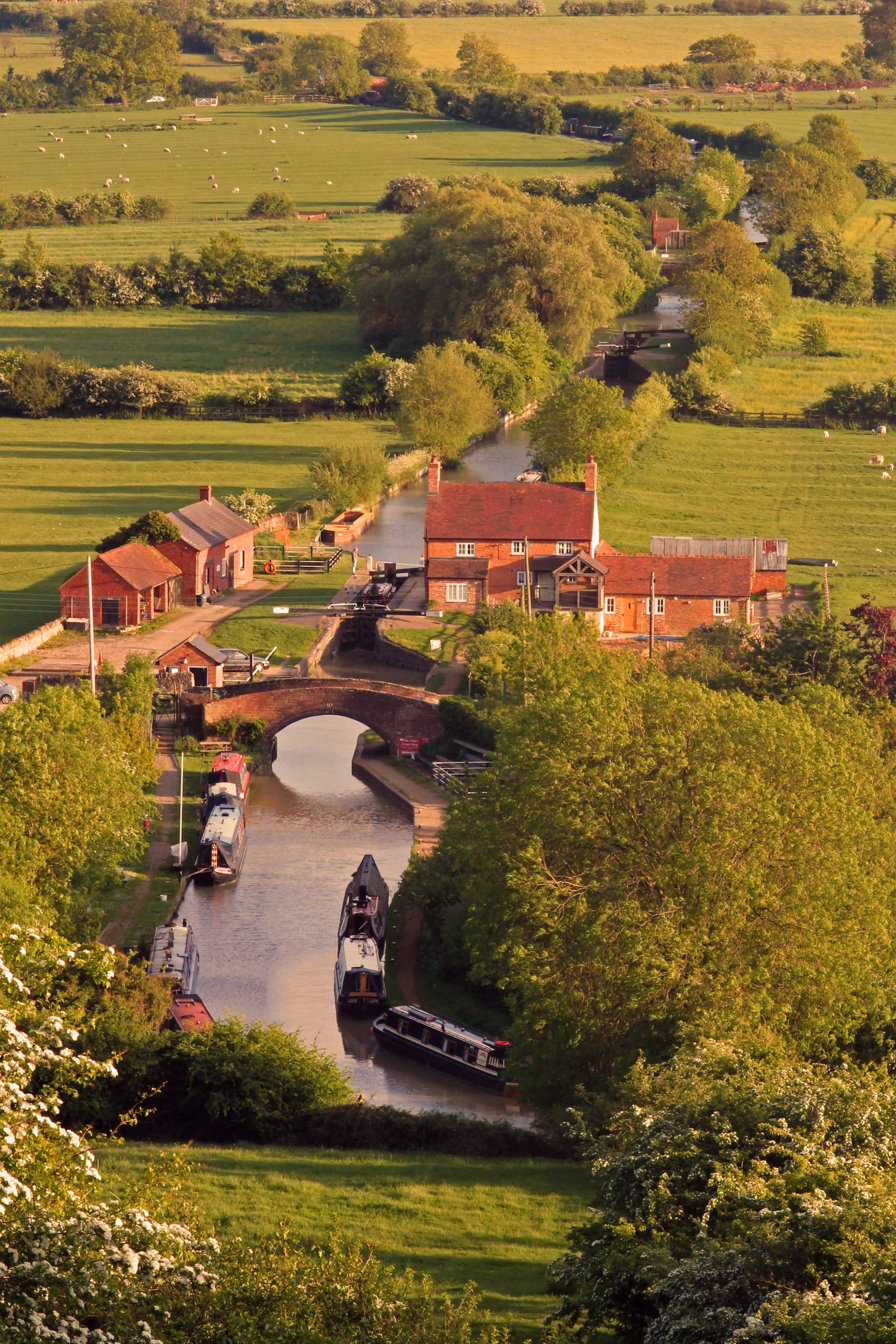
- The Oxford Canal viewed from Napton-on-the-Hill
- Interactive map of Oxford Canal
- Country: United Kingdom

Specifications
- Length: 78 miles (126 km)

History
- Current owner: Canal and River Trust
- Principal engineer: James Brindley and Samuel Simcock
- Date of act: 1769
- Date completed: 1 January 1790

Geography
- Start point: Oxford
- End point: Hawkesbury Village

The Oxford Canal is a 78-mile (126 km) narrowboat canal in southern central England linking the City of Oxford with the Coventry Canal at Hawkesbury (just north of Coventry and south of Bedworth) via Banbury and Rugby. Completed in 1790, it connects to the River Thames at Oxford, and links with the Grand Union Canal, which it is combined with for 5 miles (8 km) between to the villages of Braunston and Napton-on-the-Hill.

The canal is usually divided into the North Oxford Canal (north of Napton, via Rugby to Hawkesbury Junction near Coventry) and the South Oxford Canal, south of Napton to Banbury and Oxford.

The canal was for about 15 years the main canal artery of trade between the Midlands and London, via its connection to the Thames, until the Grand Union Canal (then called the Grand Junction Canal) took most of the London-bound traffic following its opening in 1805. The North Oxford Canal (which had been straightened in the 1830s) remained an important artery of trade carrying coal and other commodities until the 1960s; the more rural South Oxford Canal however became something of a backwater, especially following the opening of the Grand Junction Canal, and it faced closure proposals in the 1950s. Since the end of regular commercial goods carriage on the canal in the 1960s, it has gained a new use as a leisure resource, and become used primarily for narrowboat pleasure boating.

The Oxford Canal traverses Oxfordshire, Northamptonshire and east Warwickshire through broad, shallow valleys and lightly rolling hills; the canal's route northeast and then northwest forms part of the Warwickshire ring.

== The route ==
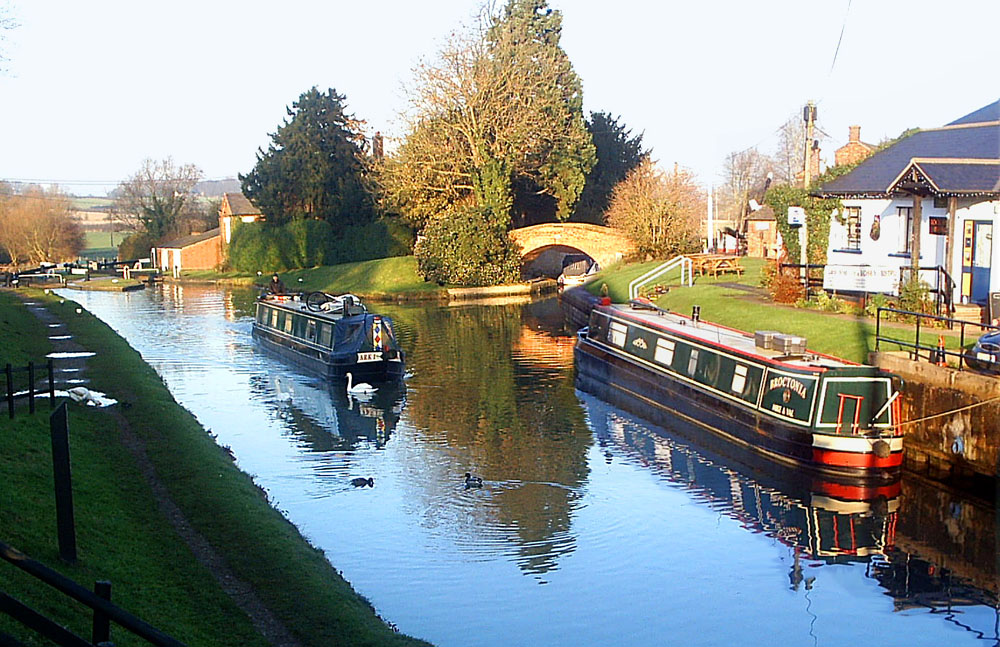
The canal and locks at Hillmorton

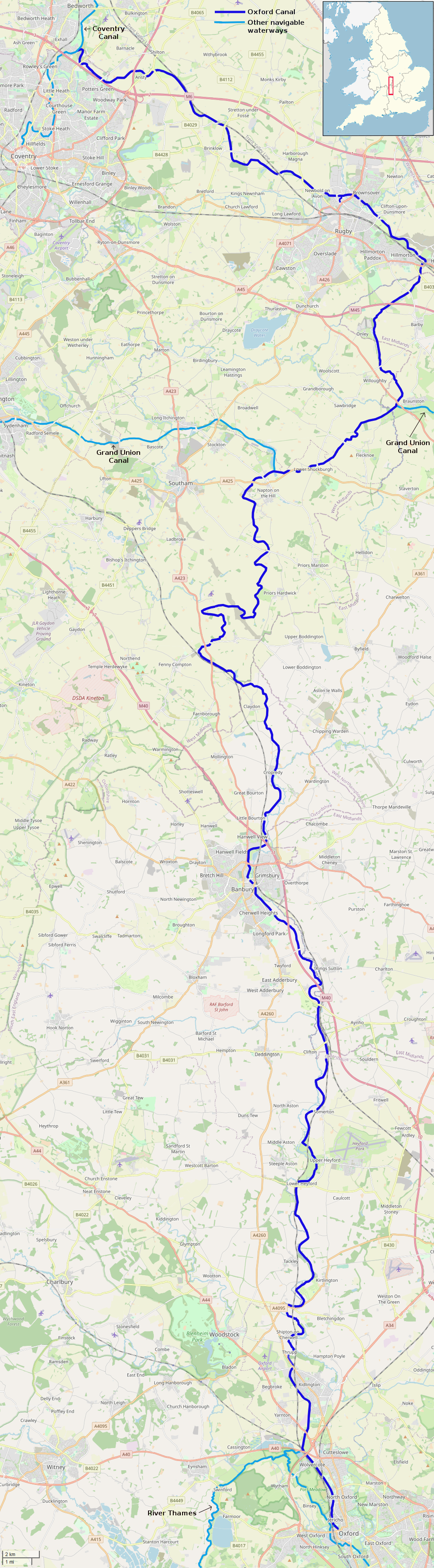
Geographic map of the Oxford Canal (zoom in to see detail)

The canal begins in Warwickshire near Hawkesbury Village at Hawkesbury Junction, also known as Sutton Stop, where it connects with the Coventry Canal, a little over 4 miles (or about 7 km) from the centre of Coventry and five miles (8 km) from Nuneaton. Within a mile were the late 18th- and 19th-century coal field/pit and colliery of the small town of Bedworth. From Hawkesbury, it runs southeast through the Warwickshire countryside for 15 miles (24 km) to Rugby.

The route between Coventry and Rugby is level, with no locks, apart from the stop lock at the junction. Parts of this section were straightened by raising and waterproofing in the 1820s; the remains of a more circuitous route (which kept to the chosen contour) can still be seen in places.

The canal winds through the northern part of Rugby. It passes through the 270-yard (250 m) Newbold Tunnel. In the churchyard in Newbold-on-Avon remains can be seen of an earlier canal tunnel built in the 1770s. It scales a flight of three locks at Hillmorton about three miles (5 km) east-southeast of the town.

East of Rugby, the canal passes southwest then south. It crosses under the M45 motorway and through broad low fields interspersed by views of wooded knolls and modest hills of Northamptonshire and Warwickshire to reach Braunston.

West of Braunston village centre, by a pub, the canal converges with the Grand Union Canal where both change direction to west-southwest. The latter canal has a major wharf, Braunston Marina, 770 yards (700 m) east and a campsite. The combined canal splits north of Napton-on-the-Hill:

- The Oxford Canal runs southwest and then turns south towards Oxford via Banbury.
- The Grand Union Canal runs north passing opposing marinas within a mile then northwest to Birmingham via Warwick.

After winding round Napton Hill, the canal ascends the Napton flight of nine locks to a local summit reach, well below the hilltop. After passing an old wharf and a pub at Fenny Compton, the canal enters a long cutting which until some time in the 19th century was a tunnel. This section is normally referred to as a "tunnel straight" or the Fenny Compton Tunnel.

The route between the farms of Priors Hardwick and Fenny Compton was never straightened, and is the most circuitous in the region: taking 5 1/2 miles (9 km) to cover 2.2 miles (3.5 km) (geodesically, as the crow flies). This coincides with the canal's highest "summit" reach in navigational terms. This reach is the "eleven-mile pound" mentioned in Tom Rolt's Narrow Boat.

The canal then descends the Claydon flight of locks and into the vale of the nascent Cherwell at Cropredy. The canal descends the valley to Oxford.

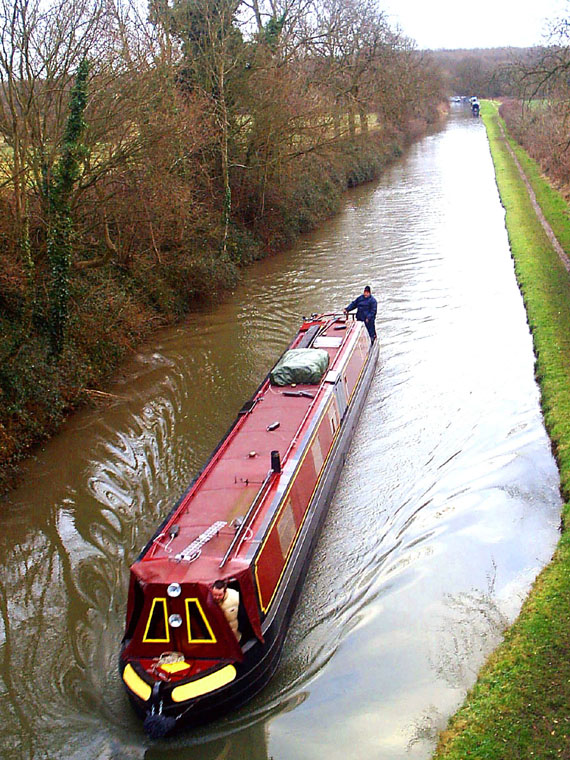
A canal boat on the canal near Brinklow on the long stretch between Coventry and Rugby.

Banbury has many visitor moorings alongside the historic and modern shopping areas in the middle of town. Banbury Town Council and Cherwell District Council treat the canal as an attraction to be encouraged; examples of its work include an old boatyard which has been incorporated into the town centre: Tooley's Historic Boatyard. About four miles (6 km) south is a lightly settled locality, Twyford Wharf, where narrowboats up to 60 feet (18 m) can be turned. Two villages nearby, Kings Sutton and Adderbury (Twyford), are within 30 minutes' walking distance along the road. Both offer several pubs.

Within Oxford's conurbation, the end of the canal has two links to the Thames:

- three miles (5 km) north of the city where Dukes Cut leads to King's Lock;
- a few hundred yards (metres) from the heart of the city centre by Oxford railway station. below Isis Lock (known to boatmen as 'Louse Lock') through Sheepwash Channel. This leads to an elongated navigable circuit at the Thames called "Four Rivers" above Osney Lock.

After 330 yards (300 m) below Isis Lock the Oxford Canal ends abruptly at Hythe Bridge Street near to the current Hythe Bridge over the Castle Mill Stream, a backwater of the River Thames that runs parallel to the Oxford Canal for its southernmost part. The canal used to continue through a bridge under Hythe Bridge Street to a turning basin and goods wharf south of Hythe Bridge Street. It then continued via a bridge under Worcester Street to end in a coal wharf beside New Road. In 1951 the basin and wharves were filled in and Nuffield College has taken part of the site.

The locks on the canal are as follows.

Locks on the Oxford Canal
Lock Number	Name	Rise of lock
1	Hawkesbury Lock (to/from Coventry Canal)	1 ft 0 in (0.30 m)
2–7	Hilmorton Locks	18 ft 7 in (5.66 m)
8–16	Napton Bottom Lock to Napton Top Lock	49 ft 1 in (14.96 m)
17–21	Claydon Top Lock to Claydon Bottom Lock	30 ft 6 in (9.30 m)
22	Elkington's Lock	6 ft 5 in (1.96 m)
23	Varney's Lock	5 ft 10 in (1.78 m)
24	Broadmoor Lock	7 ft 3 in (2.21 m)
25	Cropredy Lock	5 ft 6 in (1.68 m)
26	Slat Mill Lock	8 ft 0 in (2.44 m)
27	Bourton Lock	6 ft 5 in (1.96 m)
28	Hardwick Lock	7 ft 6 in (2.29 m)
29	Banbury Lock	5 ft 10 in (1.78 m)
30	Grant's Lock	9 ft 6 in (2.90 m)
31	King's Sutton Lock	10 ft 8 in (3.25 m)
32	Nell Bridge Lock	8 ft 8 in (2.64 m)
33	Aynho Weir Lock	1 ft 0 in (0.30 m)
34	Somerton Deep Lock	12 ft 0 in (3.66 m)
35	Heyford Common Lock	7 ft 2 in (2.18 m)
36	Allen's Lock	5 ft 0 in (1.52 m)
37	Dashwood Lock	9 ft 3 in (2.82 m)
38	Northbrook Lock	5 ft 0 in (1.52 m)
39	Pigeon Lock	8 ft 4 in (2.54 m)
40	Baker's Lock	8 ft 6 in (2.59 m)
41	Shipton Weir Lock	2 ft 5 in (0.74 m)
42	Roundham Lock	7 ft 5 in (2.26 m)
43	Kidlington Green Lock	4 ft 9 in (1.45 m)
44A	Duke's Lock	5 ft 4 in (1.63 m)
44B	Duke's Lock (to/from the Thames via Duke's Cut)	
45	Wolvercote Lock	3 ft 8 in (1.12 m)
46	Isis Lock (to/from the Thames via Sheepwash Channel)	3 ft 6 in (1.07 m)

The canal rises from Hawkesbury Junction to Hilmorton Top Lock, there is then a 6 1/2-mile (10.5 km) pound to Braunston Junction, where it joins the Grand Union canal. From Napton Junction the Oxford canal rises again though the Napton Locks. After Napton Top Lock there is a 10 1/2-mile (16.9 km) pound to Claydon Top Lock, from where the canal falls towards Oxford.

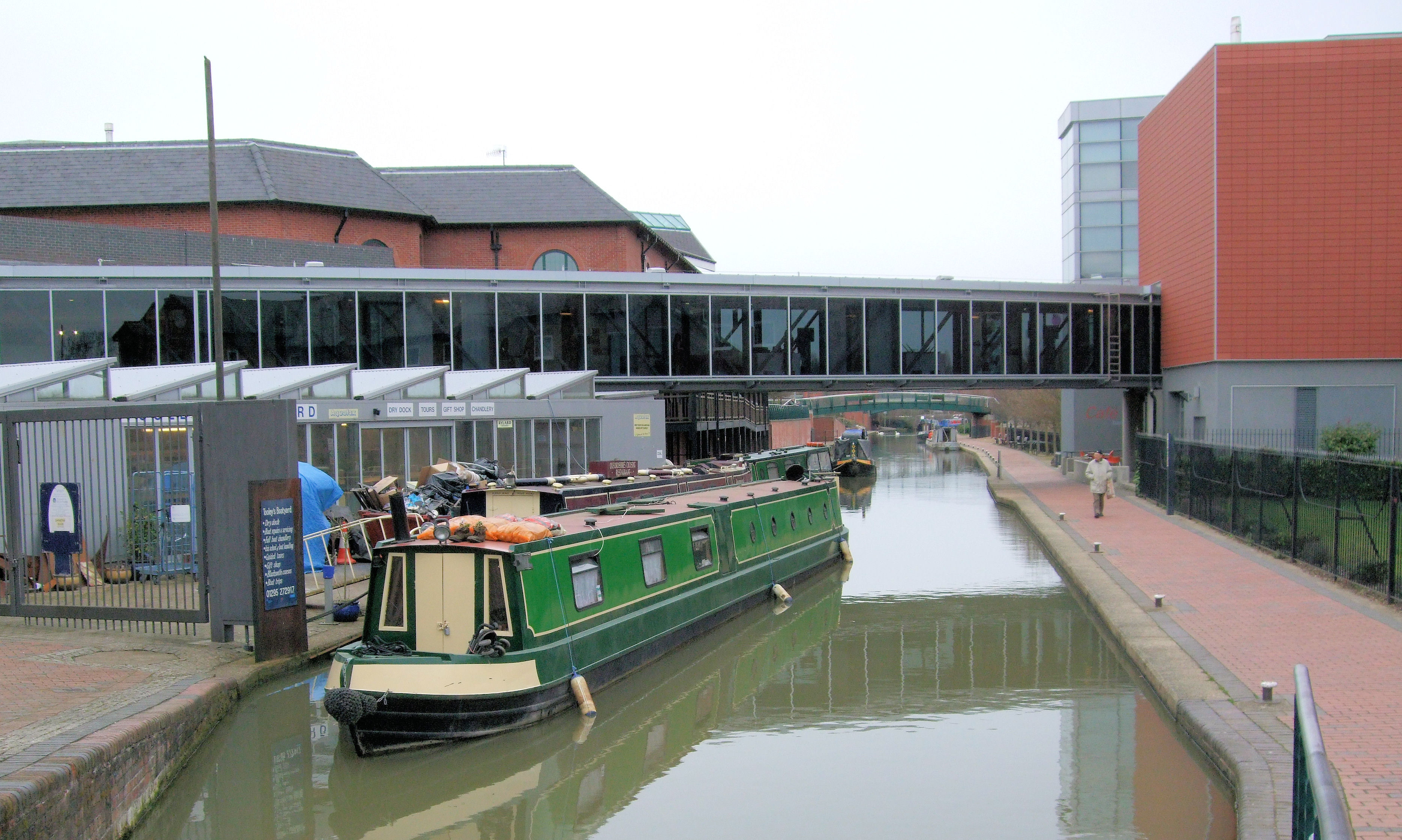
The Oxford Canal passes mainly through the Oxfordshire, Northamptonshire and Warwickshire countryside, and is often considered to be one of the most scenic canals in Britain. The construction of the Oxford Canal in 1790 aided Banbury's growth. The shot is taken at Tooley's Boatyard, Banbury.

== History ==
=== Construction ===
The Oxford Canal was constructed in several stages over a period of more than twenty years.

Oxford Canal Act 1769
- Act of Parliament
- Parliament of Great Britain
- Long title: An Act for making and maintaining a navigable Canal from the Coventry Canal Navigation to the City of Oxford.
- Citation: 9 Geo. 3. c. 70
- Territorial extent: Great Britain

Dates
- Royal assent: 21 April 1769
- Commencement: 8 November 1768 (Note: Start of session.)
- Repealed: 14 May 1829
Other legislation
Amended by	Oxford Canal Act 1775; Oxford Canal Act 1786; Oxford Canal Act 1799; Oxford Canal Act 1808
Repealed by	Oxford Canal Navigation Act 1829

Status: Repealed

Text of statute as originally enacted

In 1769 the Oxford Canal Act 1769 (9 Geo. 3. c. 70) authorising the Oxford Canal was passed, having been promoted in Parliament by Sir Roger Newdigate MP, who chaired the canal company. The intention was to link the industrial English Midlands to London via the River Thames. Construction began shortly after near Coventry. The principal motivation for the canal was the transport of coal from the Midlands to Oxford and London.

Surveying of the route and initial construction were originally supervised by the celebrated engineer James Brindley, assisted by Samuel Simcock who was also Brindley's brother-in-law. Brindley died in 1772, when the canal had only reached Brinklow, and Simcock took over. By 1774 the canal had reached Napton, but the company was already running out of money.

Oxford Canal Act 1775
- Act of Parliament
- Parliament of Great Britain
- Long title: An Act to amend an Act, made in the Ninth Year of the Reign of His present Majesty, for making and maintaining a Navigable Canal from the Coventry Canal Navigation to the City of Oxford.
- Citation: 15 Geo. 3. c. 9
- Territorial extent: Great Britain

Dates
- Royal assent: 30 March 1775
- Commencement: 29 November 1774
- Repealed: 14 May 1829
Other legislation
Amends	Oxford Canal Act 1769
Amended by	Oxford Canal Act 1786; Coventry to Oxford Canal Act 1794; Oxford Canal Act 1799; Oxford Canal Act 1808
Repealed by	Oxford Canal Navigation Act 1829

Status: Repealed

Text of statute as originally enacted

Oxford Canal Act 1786
- Act of Parliament
- Parliament of Great Britain
- Long title: An Act to amend and render effectual Two Acts of the Ninth and Fifteenth Years of His present Majesty, for making and maintaining a Navigable Canal from the Coventry Canal Navigation to the City of Oxford.
- Citation: 26 Geo. 3. c. 20
- Territorial extent: Great Britain

Dates
- Royal assent: 11 April 1786
- Commencement: 24 January 1786
- Repealed: 14 May 1829
Other legislation
Amends	Oxford Canal Act 1769; Oxford Canal Act 1775
Amended by	Coventry to Oxford Canal Act 1794; Oxford Canal Act 1799; Oxford Canal Act 1808
Repealed by	Oxford Canal Navigation Act 1829

Status: Repealed

Text of statute as originally enacted

Coventry to Oxford Canal Act 1794
- Act of Parliament
- Parliament of Great Britain
- Long title: An act for amending and altering certain acts of parliament, for making and maintaining a navigable canal, from the Coventry canal navigation, to the city of Oxford.
- Citation: 34 Geo. 3. c. 103
- Territorial extent: Great Britain

Dates
- Royal assent: 23 May 1794
- Commencement: 23 May 1794 (Note: The Acts of Parliament (Commencement) Act 1793.)
- Repealed: 14 May 1829
Other legislation
Amends	Oxford Canal Act 1769; Oxford Canal Act 1775; Oxford Canal Act 1786
Amended by	Oxford Canal Act 1799; Oxford Canal Act 1808
Repealed by	Oxford Canal Navigation Act 1829

Status: Repealed

Text of statute as originally enacted

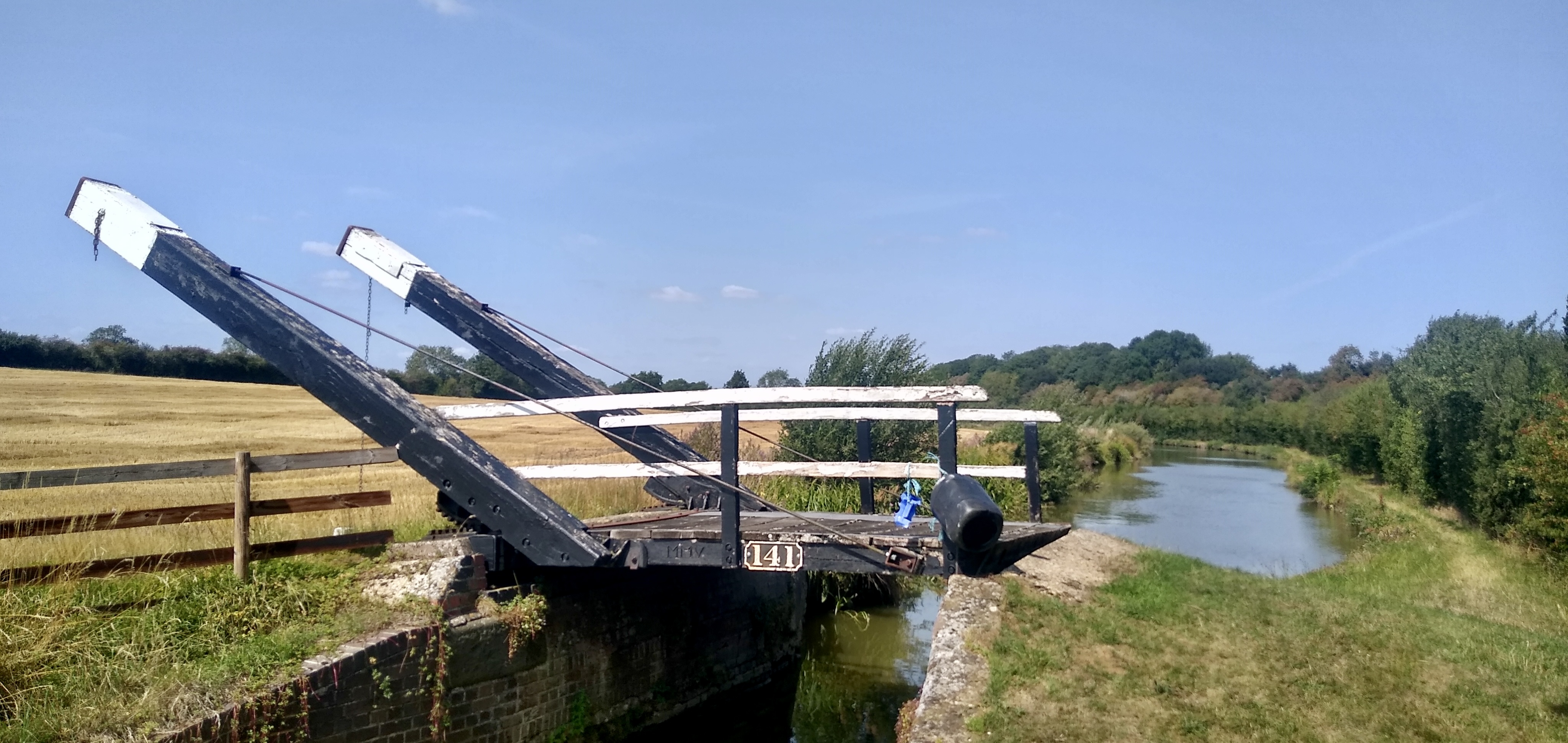
Wooden lift bridges were used on the southern section of the canal to save money

A second act, the Oxford Canal Act 1775 (15 Geo. 3. c. 9) was passed allowing the company to raise more funds. Construction soon started again and by 1778 the canal had reached Banbury. Financial problems meant that work on the final stretch from Banbury to Oxford did not begin until 1786, and when it did, James Barnes was appointed as the engineer. As funds were limited, the Banbury-Oxford stretch was built more cheaply, and to lower standards than the rest of the canal, and many cost saving measures were used whenever possible: Wooden lift or swing bridges were built, instead of more expensive fixed brick bridges. Deep locks were used wherever possible, with single gates at both ends instead of double gates. A stretch of the River Cherwell at Shipton-on-Cherwell was incorporated into the canal. This reduced construction costs, but the behaviour of the river makes the canal more difficult to use.

The Oxford Canal reached the outskirts of Oxford in 1789, when a coal wharf was opened at Heyfield Hutt, now the site of Hayfield Road. The final section into central Oxford was ceremonially opened on 1 January 1790.

The Duke's Cut, a short link from the Oxford Canal to the River Thames, just north of Oxford, was built in 1789 by the Duke of Marlborough.

The River Swift (a tributary of the River Avon) connected to the original route of the Oxford Canal near Cosford and was used as a water feeder to the canal. In 1785 there was a proposal to make the river navigable from the Oxford Canal at Cosford to the town of Lutterworth in Leicestershire. This proposal however never came to fruition. The River Swift, however is still an important feeder to the northern Oxford Canal, via the now unnavigable Brownsover Arm; a part of the canal which was bypassed when the canal was straightened.

=== Commercial use ===
==== Heyday ====
For the next 15 years the Oxford Canal became one of the most important and profitable transport links in Britain, with most commercial traffic between London and the Midlands using the route. Its principal traffic was coal from Warwickshire. It also carried stone, agricultural products and other goods.

A much more direct route between London and the Midlands, the Grand Junction Canal, was completed in 1805, connecting Braunston to London in much less distance. Much of the London-bound traffic switched to this faster route, as it avoided the passage of the River Thames which still had many flash locks. This greatly reduced Oxford Canal traffic south of Napton. However, the short section between Braunston and Napton became the link between the Warwick and Napton Canal and the Grand Junction Canal, making it part of the busy direct route between Birmingham and London. Despite these developments, the Oxford Canal remained highly profitable during this period; from 1824 to 1826, the company paid dividends of up to 55% to its shareholders.

The Grand Junction and Oxford canal companies were bitter rivals. When Parliament considered the bill for the Grand Junction Canal Act 1793 (33 Geo. 3. c. 80) for the building of the Grand Junction, the Oxford Canal successfully petitioned to make the Grand Junction pay "bar tolls" to the Oxford Canal to compensate for the loss of traffic south of Napton.

Traffic from Birmingham had to use five miles (8 km) of the Oxford Canal to get from Braunston to join the Grand Junction at Napton. The Oxford Canal exploited this by charging high tolls for Grand Junction traffic on this short section.

==== Straightening ====
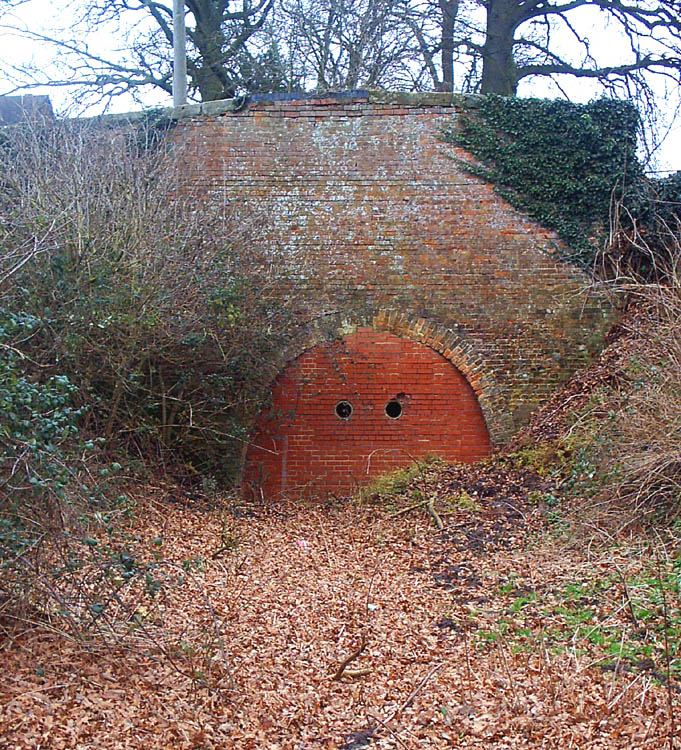
The abandoned tunnel at Newbold on the old route of the canal

The Oxford Canal was originally built as a contour canal, meaning that it twisted around hills to minimise vertical deviations from a level contour. This meant however that the canal followed a very winding and circuitous route: Although the distance between Coventry and Napton was only 16 miles (26 km) as the crow flies, the distance by the original route of the canal was 43 miles (69 km). This mattered little when the Oxford Canal had no competition, however, with increased canal competition, and one eye on the developing railway network, the company decided to straighten the route.

In 1827 Marc Isambard Brunel (father of Isambard Kingdom Brunel) re-surveyed the northern section of the canal between Braunston and Hawkesbury Junction to straighten it out and reduce navigation time. The following year another survey was carried out by Charles Vignoles. The work to straighten the canal was carried out between 1831 and 1834, the majority of the work being in the Rugby area, and this reduced the distance by 14 3/4 miles (23.7 km). The original tunnel at Newbold-on-Avon was abandoned when the canal was straightened, and replaced by a new one on a different alignment. The south portal of the old tunnel can still be seen next to the churchyard. The old line of the canal was either abandoned, or remained in use as arms serving various village wharves. The section south of Napton was never straightened.

==== Slow decline ====
The straightening of the canal coincided with the beginning of the railway age, and the opening of the London and Birmingham Railway in 1838, signalled the end of the dominance of the canals. However, despite the railway competition, the total tonnages of cargo carried on the canal did not decline immediately, and in fact continued to rise for some time, however, the company was forced to slash its tolls in order to remain competitive, and this put an end to the large profits which had previously been made, although ironically the railways provided a new source of income to the canal, who paid them to provide water for their locomotives at Rugby. Traffic on the canal remained such that the three locks at Hillmorton, the first on the canal after the stop lock at Hawkesbury Junction, became severely congested. The solution to the congestion was to duplicate or twin the existing locks at Hillmorton, creating three pairs of two parallel narrow locks, which allowed twice the traffic to pass the lock at any time. The work to double the locks was completed in August 1840. In 1842, nearly 21,000 boats passed through the locks.

In 1833 a section of the new line of canal in Barby Fields near Dunchurch was used as a test site for a new wrought iron boat, Swallow, built by Graham and Houston. Drawn by two horses, the boat completed a distance of 1.5 mile in 7 minutes 35 seconds, a speed of almost 12 miles per hour.

Traffic on the Oxford Canal held up reasonably well in the face of railway competition compared to many other navigations, but did see a gradual decline; in 1838, 520,000 tons were carried, which declined to 482,000 tons in 1868. However, income declined much more sharply due to the company slashing its tolls; takings which had gone from £18,478 in 1791/3, and then risen to a maximum of £90,446 in 1827/29, then fell to £26,312 in 1855. Nevertheless, the company was still profitable, and was able to pay dividends.

The northern section of the Oxford Canal between Coventry, Braunston and Napton remained an important trunk route, and remained extremely busy with freight traffic until the 1960s. The staple traffic was coal from the Warwickshire and Leicestershire coalfields to London via the Grand Union Canal. However, the southern section from Napton to Oxford became something of a backwater, and carried mostly local traffic.

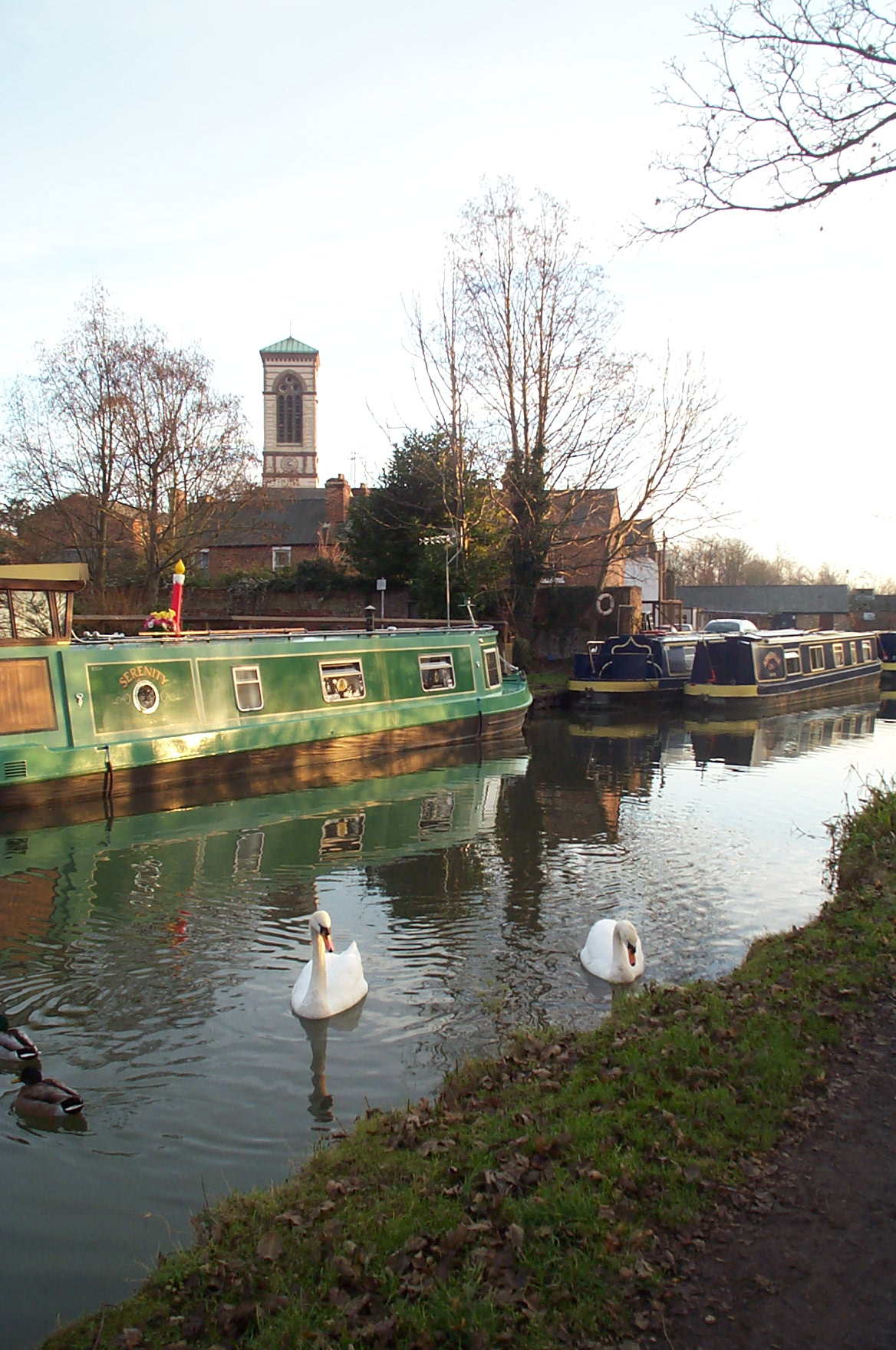
Looking from the Oxford Canal towards Jericho, with the campanile of St Barnabas Church in the background

==== 20th century ====
In 1934, the Braunston-Napton stretch of the canal was taken over by the recently formed Grand Union Canal company, and widened as part of that company's London to Birmingham main-line.

In a bid to raise funds to overcome an arrears of maintenance, in 1936, the Oxford Canal Company decided to sell off their terminal basin at Oxford. In 1937 Baron Nuffield (Later Viscount Nuffield) bought the canal basin at Oxford for £133,373 (equivalent to £7,855,200 in 2025). In 1951 he filled it in and built Nuffield College on part of the former coal wharf. Coal traffic was relocated to a canal wharf in Juxon Street, in Jericho, Oxford. The goods wharf and the remainder of the coal wharf are now under a public car park that Nuffield College lets to Oxford City Council. For this reason, the canal today ends abruptly in central Oxford.

Many Oxford Canal boatmen and women favoured horse traction long after those on other canals had changed their narrowboats to diesel power. In the 1930s, only around one in thirty of the boats trading on the canal's southern section was mechanically powered. One narrowboat carrying coal on the Oxford Canal was drawn by a mule until 1959 and was the last horse-drawn freight narrowboat in Great Britain. This boat, Friendship, is preserved at the National Waterways Museum, Ellesmere Port.

The Oxford Canal remained independent until it was nationalised in 1948 and became part of the Docks and Inland Waterways Executive, later the British Waterways Board. The Oxford Canal remained profitable until the mid-1950s, paying a dividend right up until nationalisation. As with most of Britain's narrow canal system, the Oxford Canal suffered from a rapid decline in freight traffic after the Second World War. By the mid-1950s very few narrowboats traded south of Napton and the southern section was at one point being threatened with closure, although the northern section (Napton to Coventry) remained well-used by commercial traffic until the 1960s.

=== Revival ===
During the 1960s pleasure boating began to grow in popularity and replace the old trading boats, After a fact-finding cruise on the canal, Barbara Castle (Minister for Transport) rejected a proposal for closure. The canal was designated as a cruiseway under the Transport Act 1968, which defined it as being a waterway to be maintained for leisure use.

The canal is now thriving. In the summer it is one of the most crowded canals on the network.

== Oxford Canal Walk ==
The towpath of the canal, with a 5 1/2-mile (9 km) extension from Hawkesbury Junction to Coventry on the towpath of the Coventry Canal, forms the 82-mile (132 km) Oxford Canal Walk. The 10-mile (16 km) stretch from Oxford to Kirtlington, where the Oxfordshire Way meets the canal, is also part of European walking route E2. The Canal Walk is popular with geocachers with many Geocache sites located alongside the canal.

== In literature ==
In Colin Dexter's crime novel The Wench Is Dead, Inspector Morse solves, from his hospital bed, the supposed Oxford Canal murder of Joanna Franks in 1859.

== See also ==
- Canals of Great Britain
- Eagle Ironworks, Oxford
- History of the British canal system

== Bibliography ==
- British Waterways Board (1965). Inland Cruising Booklet 6: Cruising on the Oxford Canal (New ed.). London: British Waterways Board.
- Compton, Hugh J. (1976). The Oxford Canal. Newton Abbot: David & Charles. ISBN 0-7153-7238-6. OCLC 3198544.
- Davies, Mark; Robinson, Catherine (2003) [2001]. A Towpath Walk in Oxford. Oxford: Oxford Towpath Press. ISBN 0-9535593-1-9.
- Rolt, L. T. C. (1944). Narrow Boat. ISBN 0-413-22000-1.
- Waterways World (1989). Oxford Canal Cruising Guide. ISBN 1-870002-25-3.

Next confluence upstream	River Thames	Next confluence downstream
River Evenlode (north)	Oxford Canal	Castle Mill Stream (north)
