= HMCS Hawkesbury =

Modified Flower-class corvette of the Royal Canadian Navy

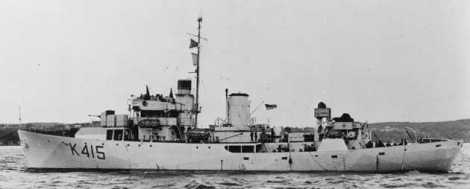
- HMCS Hawkesbury

History

Canada
- Name: HMCS Hawkesbury
- Namesake: Hawkesbury, Ontario
- Ordered: April 1942
- Builder: Morton Engineering and Dry Dock Co., Quebec City
- Laid down: 20 July 1943
- Launched: 16 November 1943
- Commissioned: 14 June 1944
- Decommissioned: 10 June 1945
- Identification: Pennant number: K415
- Honours and awards: Atlantic 1944–45
- Fate: Sold for mercantile use 1950, scrapped 1956

General characteristics
- Class & type: Flower-class corvette (modified)
- Displacement: 1,015 long tons (1,031 t; 1,137 short tons)
- Length: 208 ft (63.40 m)o/a
- Beam: 33 ft (10.06 m)
- Draught: 11 ft (3.35 m)
- Propulsion: single shaft; 2 × oil fired water tube boilers; 1 triple-expansion reciprocating steam engine; 2,750 ihp (2,050 kW)
- Speed: 16 knots (29.6 km/h)
- Range: 7,400 nautical miles (13,705 km) at 10 knots (18.5 km/h)
- Complement: 90
- Sensors & processing systems: 1 Type 271 SW2C radar; 1 Type 144 sonar
- Armament: 1 × 4 in (102 mm) QF Mk XIX naval gun; 1 × 2-pounder Mk.VIII single "pom-pom"; 2 × 20 mm Oerlikon single; 1 × Hedgehog A/S mortar; 4 × Mk.II depth charge throwers; 2 × depth charge rails with 70 depth charges

HMCS Hawkesbury was a modified Flower-class corvette that served with the Royal Canadian Navy during the Second World War. She fought primarily in the Battle of the Atlantic as a convoy escort. She was named for Hawkesbury, Ontario.

== Background ==
Flower-class corvettes like Hawkesbury serving with the Royal Canadian Navy during the Second World War were different from earlier and more traditional sail-driven corvettes. The "corvette" designation was created by the French as a class of small warships; the Royal Navy borrowed the term for a period but discontinued its use in 1877. During the hurried preparations for war in the late 1930s, Winston Churchill reactivated the corvette class, needing a name for smaller ships used in an escort capacity, in this case based on a whaling ship design. The generic name "flower" was used to designate the class of these ships, which – in the Royal Navy – were named after flowering plants.

Corvettes commissioned by the Royal Canadian Navy during the Second World War were named after communities for the most part, to better represent the people who took part in building them. This idea was put forth by Admiral Percy W. Nelles. Sponsors were commonly associated with the community for which the ship was named. Royal Navy corvettes were designed as open sea escorts, while Canadian corvettes were developed for coastal auxiliary roles which was exemplified by their minesweeping gear. Eventually the Canadian corvettes would be modified to allow them to perform better on the open seas.

== Construction ==
Hawkesbury was ordered April 1942 as part of the 1942-43 modified Flower-class building programme. This programme was known as the Increased Endurance (IE). Many changes were made, all from lessons that had been learned in previous versions of the Flower-class. The bridge was made a full deck higher and built to naval standards instead of the more civilian-like bridges of previous versions. The platform for the 4-inch main gun was raised to minimize the amount of spray over it and to provide a better field of fire. It was also connected to the wheelhouse by a wide platform that was now the base for the Hedgehog anti-submarine mortar that this version was armed with. Along with the new Hedgehog, this version got the new QF 4-inch Mk XIX main gun, which was semi-automatic, used fixed ammunition and had the ability to elevate higher giving it an anti-aircraft ability.

Other superficial changes to this version include an upright funnel and pressurized boiler rooms which eliminated the need for hooded ventilators around the base of the funnel. This changes the silhouette of the corvette and made it more difficult for submariners to tell which way the corvette was laying.

Hawkesbury was laid down by Morton Engineering and Dry Dock Co. at Quebec City, Quebec 20 July 1943 and was launched 16 November 1943. She was commissioned into the Royal Canadian Navy 14 June 1944 at Quebec. Due to her late arrival into the war Hawkesbury never had a refit.

== Service history ==
After workups Hawkesbury joined the Mid-Ocean Escort Force as a trans-Atlantic convoy escort. She was assigned to escort group C-7 in September 1944. She served with the group for the rest of the war. She returned to Canada in June 1945.

Lieutenant Commander William G. Curry served as the only commanding officer of HMCS Hawkesbury throughout the Second World War, having commissioned the Flower-class corvette new in 1944. Curry's naval service began earlier in the war as a communications officer aboard HMCS Snowberry, a British-built corvette on loan to the Royal Canadian Navy, during his first Atlantic crossing en route to a communications course in England. On that voyage, lookouts sighted an unidentified vessel on the horizon, which proved to be the British battleship HMS Rodney. After Curry signalled a challenge, Rodney is said to have replied, "Carry on Canada with your gallant little navy." Curry went on to accumulate over 400 days at sea during the war, an achievement later marked by a commemorative certificate.

Hawkesbury was paid off at Sydney, Nova Scotia 10 July 1945. She was transferred to the War Assets Corporation and laid up at Sorel, Quebec. She was sold for mercantile conversion and reappeared in 1950 as Campuchea under a Cambodian flag. In December 1956 she was broken up at Hong Kong by Hong Kong Chiap Hua Manufactory Co. The ship's bell that was used during her service with the Royal Canadian Navy was donated to her namesake town of Hawkesbury as part of the Canadian Naval Centennial.
