= Michael Mansbridge =

Michael Winstanley Mansbridge (1932 – 17 January 2014) was a British Anglican priest who was Archdeacon in Cyprus and the Gulf from 1983 to 1997. He was then Archdeacon in Cyprus from 1997 to 1999.

He was Chaplain of the University of Nairobi from 1962 to 1965; Vicar of Chilvers Coton with Astley from 1965 to 1975 and Rural Dean of Nuneaton from 1967-1974. He served as Vicar of Holy Trinity, Leamington from 1975 to 1988 before his appointment as Archdeacon.
