= Coventry Arena railway station =

Railway station in the West Midlands, England

Coordinates: 52.4469°N 1.4948°W

Coventry Arena
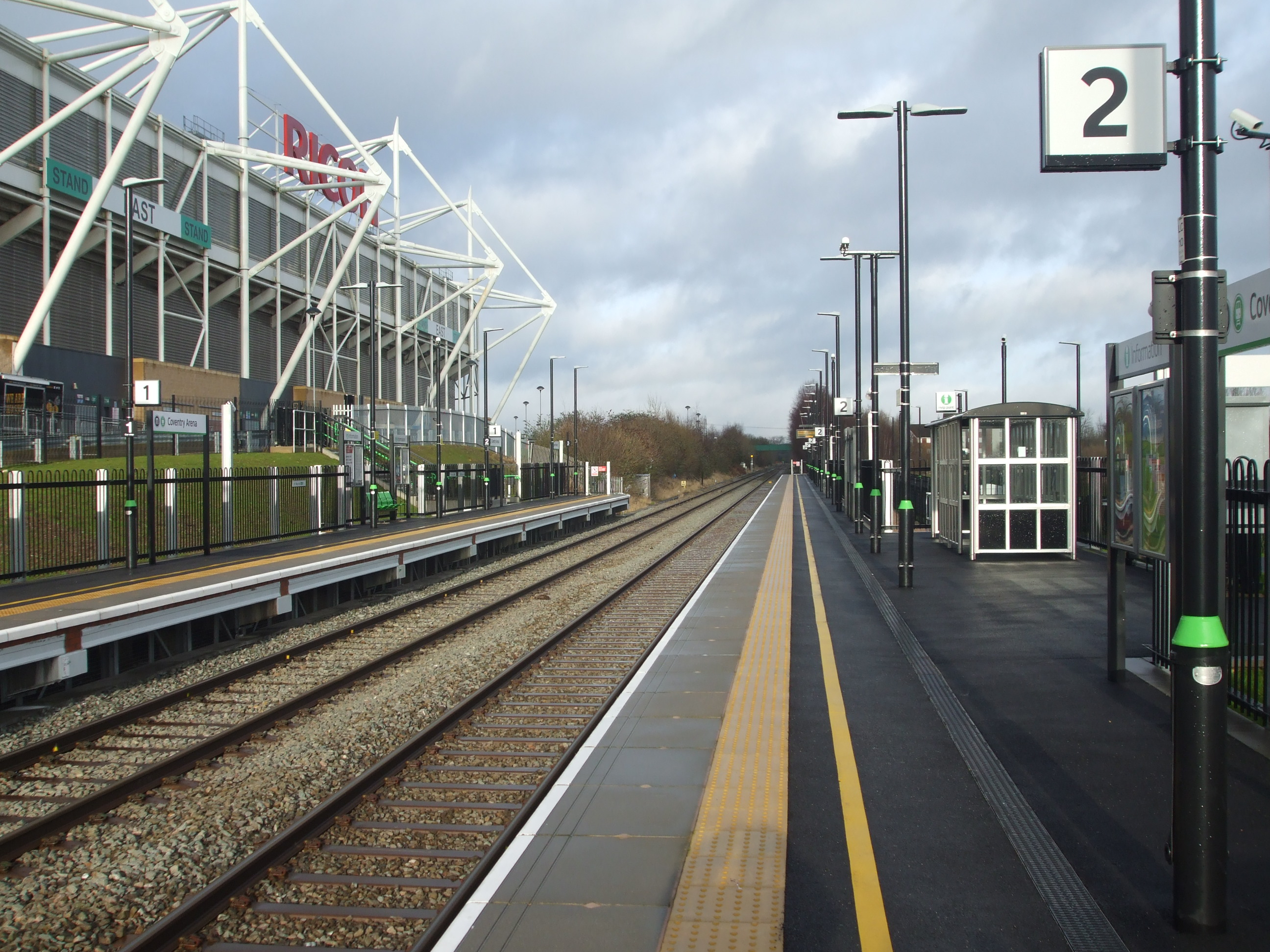
- Station soon after opening in January 2016

General information
- Location: Coventry; England
- Grid reference: SP344833
- Manager: West Midlands Railway
- Transit authority: Transport for West Midlands
- Platforms: 2

Other information
- Station code: CAA
- Fare zone: 5

Key dates
- 18 January 2016: Opened

Passengers
- 2021/22: ▲68,134
- 2022/23: ▲107,660
- 2023/24: ▲108,950
- 2024/25: ▲135,028
- 2025/26: ▲177,370
Location
Notes
- Passenger statistics from the Office of Rail & Road

Coventry Arena railway station is a railway station on the Coventry-Nuneaton Line. Located to the north of Coventry, England, it serves the adjacent Coventry Arena, for which it is named. It was opened on 18 January 2016, along with Bermuda Park station after considerable delays.

Although the station was intended to serve the adjacent arena, it was announced in August 2015 that the station would be closed for one hour preceding and following football matches, rugby matches and concerts on safety grounds as there was insufficient rolling stock to run the services necessary for spectators: while six-carriage trains could be chartered to run every half-an-hour during weekends, the fares generated would not cover the chartering cost.

== History ==
No previous station has existed at this site. However, the former Longford & Exhall station, which closed in 1949, was situated around 1/2 mile (800 m) to the north.

Funding for the new station was approved in December 2011. However, a number of setbacks meant that construction did not begin until October 2014 with services projected to start in June 2015, although this was later pushed back several times. The station opened together with Bermuda Park station in Nuneaton on 18 January 2016.

== Services ==
One train per hour calls in each direction Mondays to Saturdays throughout the day, with southbound trains continuing to Leamington Spa via Coventry and Kenilworth and northbound services running towards Nuneaton via Bedworth. Sunday services do not start running until after 10am, but then run hourly until the end of service.

Since 2023, this route has been branded as the Elephant & Bear Line.

Preceding station	National Rail	Following station
Coventry	West Midlands Railway Leamington–Coventry–Nuneaton	Bedworth
