= Higham railway station =

Higham railway station may refer to a number of stations in the United Kingdom.

- Higham railway station (Kent), an open station on the North Kent Line
- Higham railway station (Suffolk), former station on the Ipswich to Ely Line
- Higham on the Hill railway station, former station on the Nuneaton to Ashby line
