= Bermuda Park railway station =

Railway station in Warwickshire, England

Bermuda Park
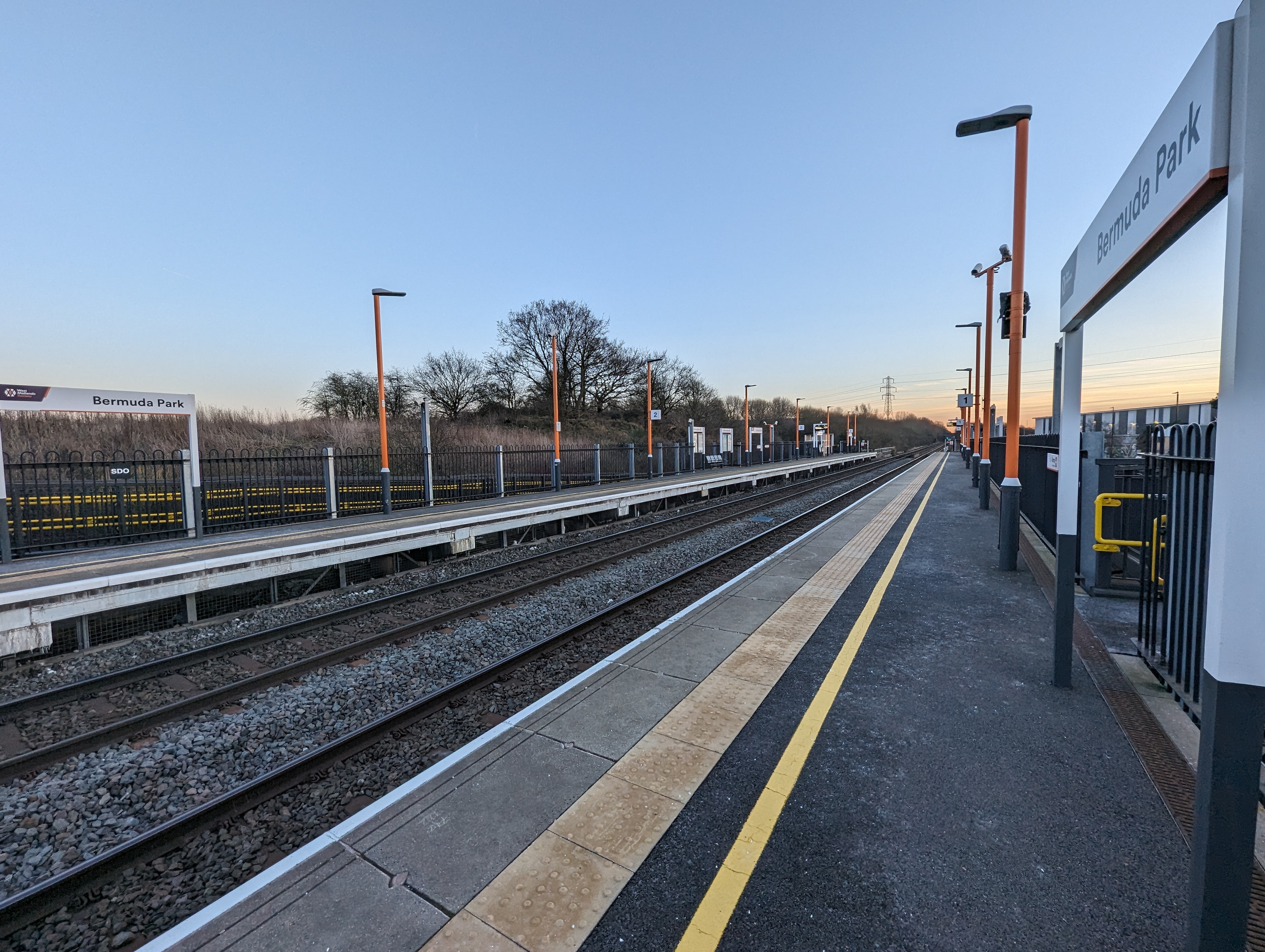
- Bermuda Park station seen in January 2024

General information
- Location: Bermuda, Nuneaton and Bedworth; England
- Coordinates: 52.5029°N 1.4726°W
- Grid reference: SP358896
- Manager: West Midlands Railway
- Platforms: 2

Other information
- Station code: BEP

Key dates
- 18 January 2016: Opened

Passengers
- 2021/22: ▲25,612
- 2022/23: ▼21,942
- 2023/24: ▼19,798
- 2024/25: ▲28,434
- 2025/26: ▲38,086
Location
Notes
- Passenger statistics from the Office of Rail and Road

Bermuda Park railway station is a railway station in the Bermuda area of Nuneaton, Warwickshire, England. It serves the Bermuda Park Industrial Estate, on the Coventry to Nuneaton Line between the existing stations at Nuneaton and Bedworth. Funding for the new station was approved in December 2011, along with that for the new Coventry Arena railway station. Both stations opened on 18 January 2016.

A planning application for the station was submitted to Warwickshire County Council in June 2012. Warwickshire County Council subsequently submitted an application to Nuneaton and Bedworth Borough Council for the station in November 2013.

Work on building the station started on 6 October 2014. Work was announced as "nearing completion" in March 2015, with piling completed ready for the platforms to be installed. Having originally been scheduled to be completed by the summer of 2015, the completion of the project was delayed several times. The eventual opening date of Monday 18 January 2016 was announced by train operator London Midland on 15 January 2016.

No station previously existed at this site, but the former Chilvers Coton station, which British Railways closed in 1965, was about 1/2 mile (800 m) to the north.

== Services ==
One train per hour calls in each direction Mondays to Saturdays throughout the day, northbound to Nuneaton only, with southbound trains continuing towards Coventry, Kenilworth and Leamington Spa. Sunday services do not start running until after 10 am.

Since 2023, this route has been branded as the Elephant & Bear Line.

Preceding station	National Rail	Following station
Bedworth	West Midlands Railway Leamington – Coventry – Nuneaton	Nuneaton
