= West Midlands Trains =

British state-owned train operating company

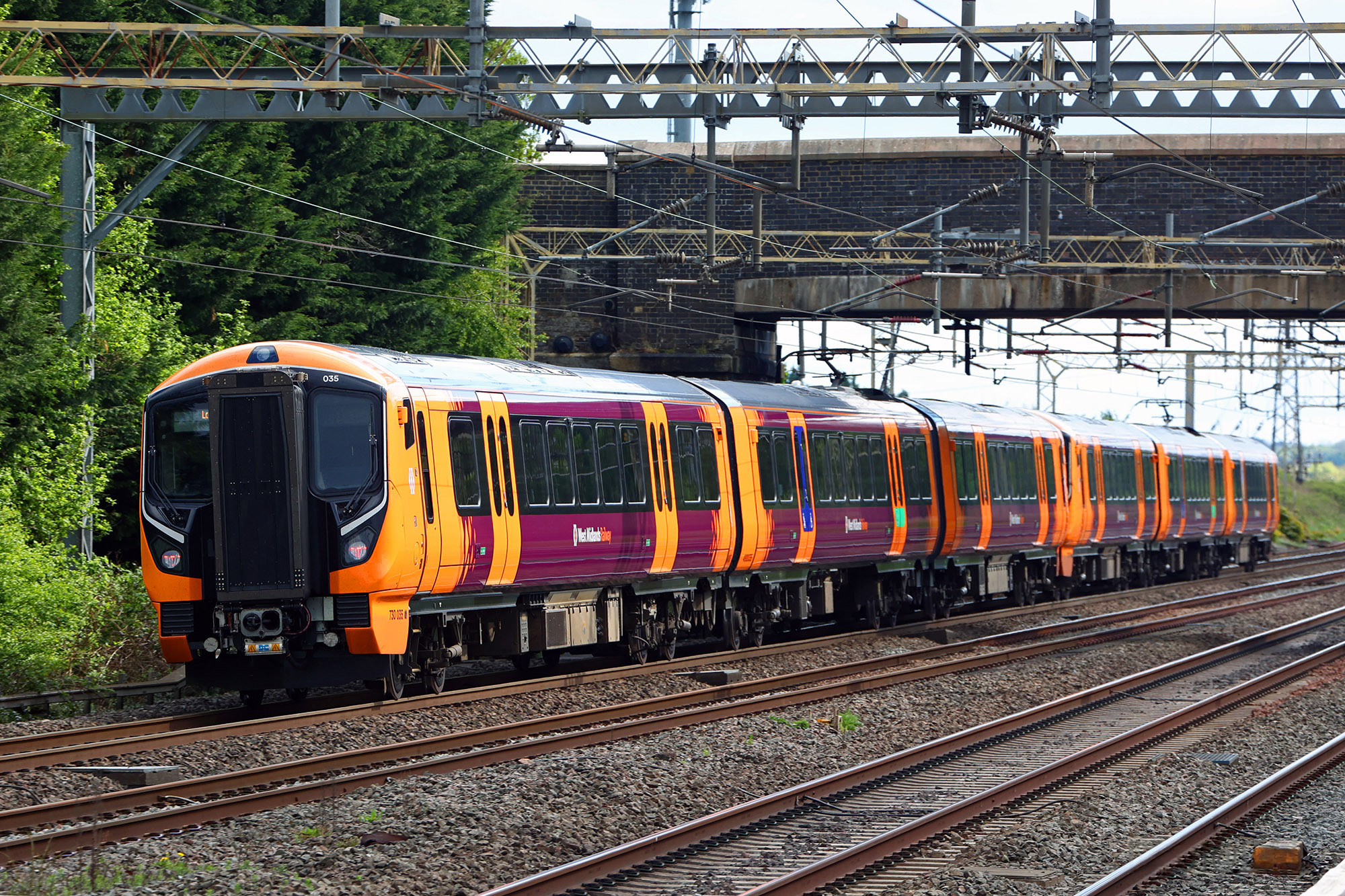
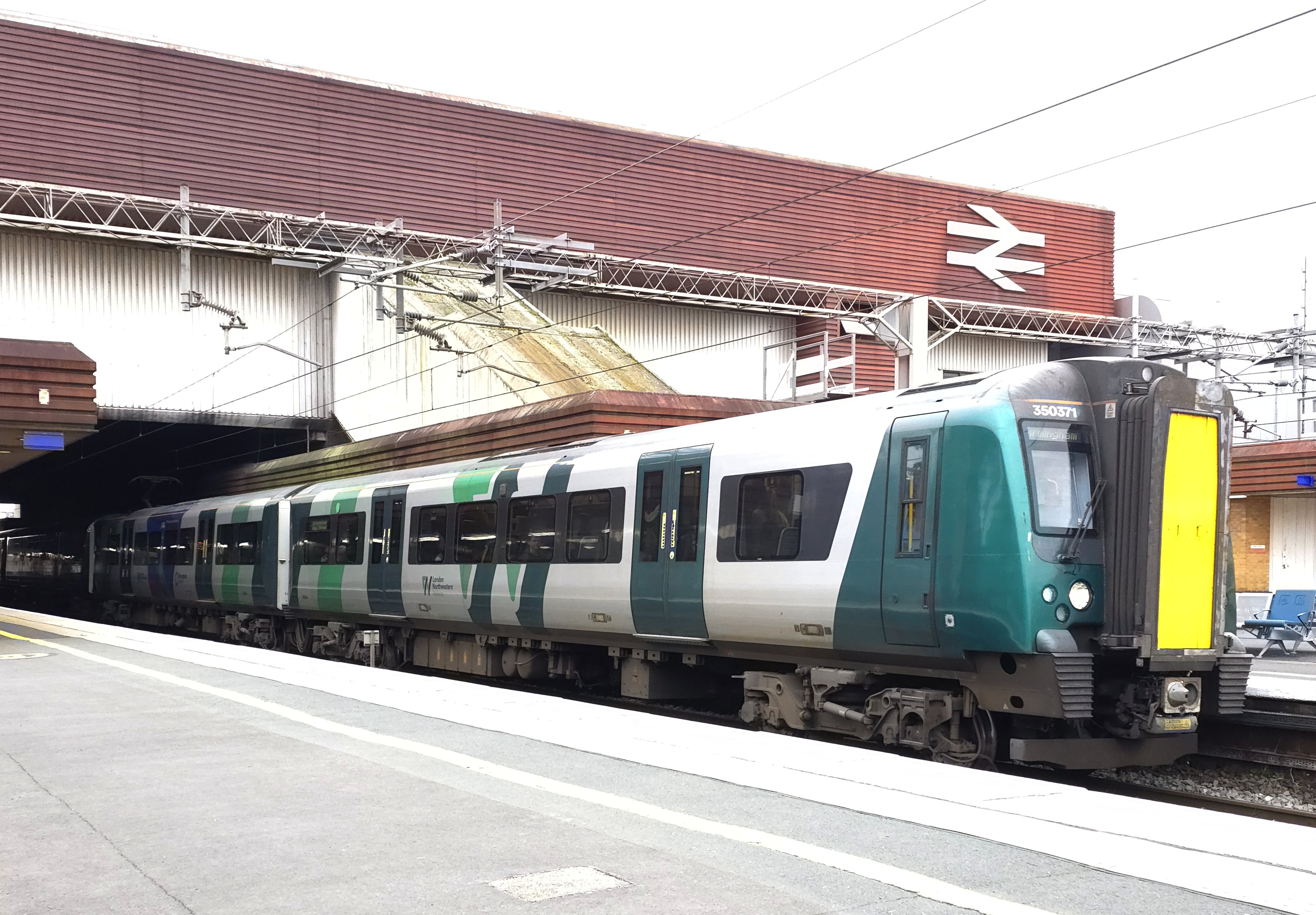
- Top/left: Class 730/0 Landmark in WMR livery at Cheddington; Bottom/right: Class 350/3 in LNR livery at Birmingham International

Overview
- Franchises: West Midlands; 1 February 2026 – Present
- Main regions: Greater London; West Midlands
- Other regions: East of England; East Midlands; North West; South East
- Fleet: West Midlands Railway: Class 139 Parry People Mover; Class 172 Turbostar; Class 196 Civity; Class 730/0 Aventra; London Northwestern Railway: Class 150 Sprinter; Class 350 Desiro; Class 730/0 Aventra; Class 730/2 Aventra
- Stations called at: 178
- Stations operated: 146
- Parent company: DfT Operator
- Headquarters: Birmingham
- Reporting mark: LM
- Predecessor: West Midlands Trains Limited

Technical
- Length: 539 mi (867 km)

Other
- Website: westmidlandsrailway.co.uk londonnorthwesternrailway.co.uk
Route map
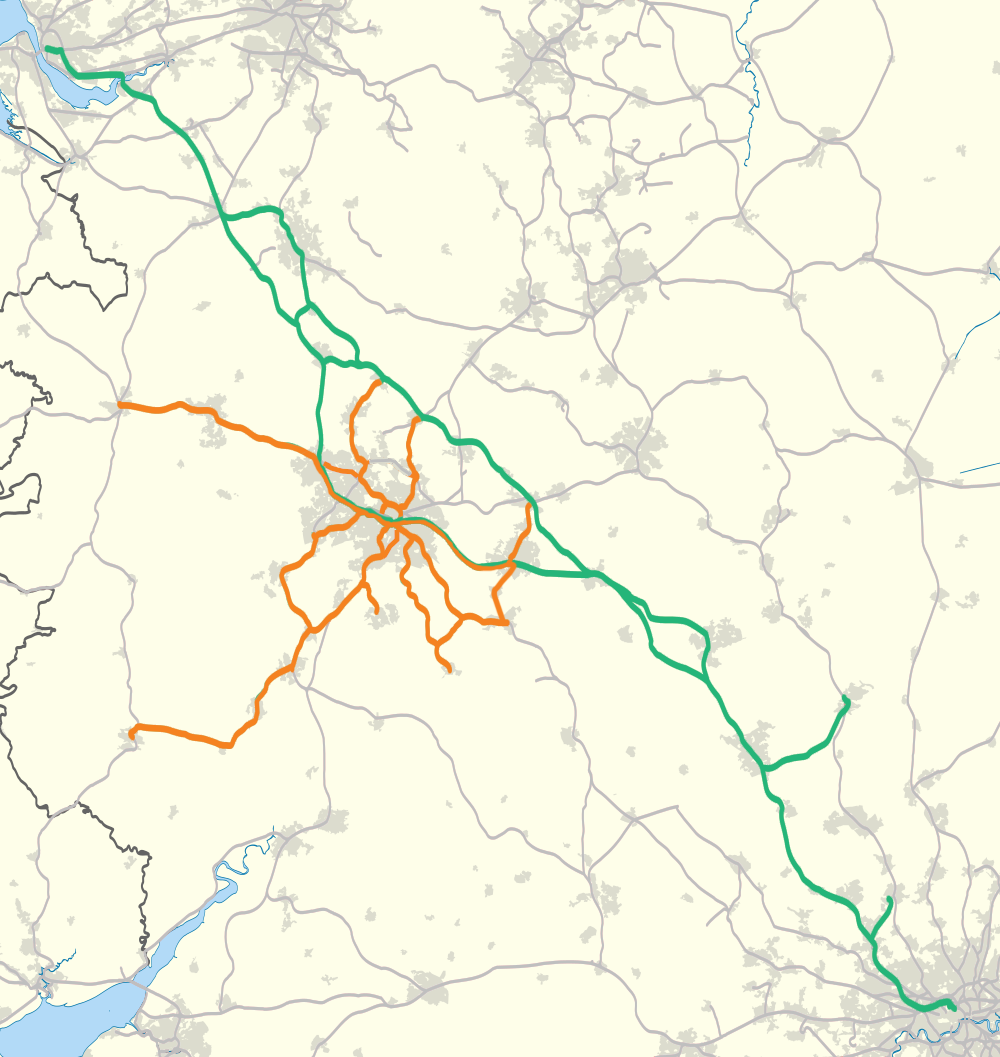
West Midlands Railway
London Northwestern Railway

WM Trains Limited, trading as West Midlands Trains, is a state-owned British train operating company that operates commuter and local services in the West Midlands region and on the West Coast Main Line between London and the Northwest under two trading names: within the West Midlands region as West Midlands Railway (WMR) and outside the region as London Northwestern Railway (LNR). It assumed responsibility for these services on 1 February 2026 at the conclusion of the outsourcing contract previously placed with Transport UK Group and Mitsui & Co. The company is now part of the GBR West Midlands business unit, which is bringing together train and track operations in preparation for the establishment of Great British Railways.

== Services ==
=== London Northwestern Railway services ===
WMT's services along the West Coast Main Line (WCML) rail corridor are operated under the London Northwestern Railway brand. These services include:

- services out of London Euston;
- two local lines that branch off the WCML at Watford Junction and Bletchley.

As of February 2026, the typical off-peak Monday–Saturday London Northwestern Railway service pattern, with frequencies in trains per hour (tph), includes:

West Coast Main Line
Route	tph	Calling at
London Euston – Tring	2	Harrow & Wealdstone; Watford Junction; Hemel Hempstead; Berkhamsted
London Euston – Milton Keynes Central	2	Harrow & Wealdstone; Bushey; Watford Junction; Kings Langley; Apsley; Hemel Hempstead; Berkhamsted; Tring; Cheddington, Leighton Buzzard; Bletchley
London Euston – Birmingham New Street	2	Watford Junction (1 tph); Leighton Buzzard; Bletchley; Milton Keynes Central; Wolverton; Northampton; Long Buckby; Rugby; Coventry; Canley; Tile Hill; Berkswell; Hampton-in-Arden; Birmingham International
London Euston – Crewe	1	Milton Keynes Central; Rugby; Nuneaton; Atherstone; Tamworth; Lichfield Trent Valley; Rugeley Trent Valley; Stafford
Stafford – Crewe	1	Stone; Stoke-on-Trent; Longport; Kidsgrove; Alsager
Birmingham New Street – Liverpool Lime Street	1	Smethwick Galton Bridge; Wolverhampton; Penkridge; Stafford; Crewe; Winsford; Hartford; Acton Bridge; Runcorn; Liverpool South Parkway
Birmingham New Street – Liverpool Lime Street	1	Coseley; Wolverhampton; Penkridge; Stafford; Crewe; Runcorn; Liverpool South Parkway; Mossley Hill
Abbey Line
Route	tph	Calling at
Watford Junction – St Albans Abbey	1	Watford North; Garston; Bricket Wood; How Wood; Park Street
Marston Vale Line
Route	tph	Calling at
Bletchley – Bedford	1	Fenny Stratford; Bow Brickhill; Woburn Sands; Aspley Guise; Ridgmont; Lidlington; Millbrook; Stewartby; Kempston Hardwick; Bedford St Johns

The primary express trains along the WCML are provided by Avanti West Coast.

=== West Midlands Railway services ===
In the West Midlands region, WMT's train services are operated under the West Midlands Railway brand. These services include:

- services through Birmingham;
- the Elephant & Bear Line (Nuneaton - Leamington) branch line.

Services on the short Stourbridge Town branch line are run by the open access operator Pre Metro Operations, who operate services on behalf of WMT under the West Midlands Railway brand name.

As of April 2026, the typical off-peak Monday–Saturday West Midlands Railway service pattern, with frequencies in trains per hour (tph), includes:

Birmingham – Shrewsbury
Route	tph	Calling at
Birmingham New Street – Shrewsbury	1	Smethwick Galton Bridge; Wolverhampton; Shifnal; Telford Central; Wellington
Birmingham New Street – Shrewsbury	1	Tame Bridge Parkway; Darlaston; Willenhall; Wolverhampton; Bilbrook; Codsall; Albrighton; Cosford; Shifnal; Telford Central; Oakengates; Wellington
Malvern Line
Route	tph	Calling at
Birmingham New Street – Hereford	1	University; Bromsgrove; Droitwich Spa; Worcester Foregate Street; Malvern Link; Great Malvern; Colwall; Ledbury; Some journeys additionally call at Worcester Shrub Hill after Droitwich Spa
Cross-City Line
Route	tph	Calling at
Lichfield Trent Valley – Bromsgrove	2	Lichfield City; Shenstone; Blake Street; Butlers Lane; Four Oaks; Sutton Coldfield; Wylde Green; Chester Road; Erdington; Gravelly Hill, Aston; Duddeston; Birmingham New Street; Five Ways; University; Selly Oak; Bournville; Kings Norton; Northfield; Longbridge; Barnt Green (1 tph)
Four Oaks – Redditch	2	Sutton Coldfield; Wylde Green; Chester Road; Erdington; Gravelly Hill; Aston; Birmingham New Street; Five Ways; University; Selly Oak; Bournville; Kings Norton; Northfield; Longbridge; Barnt Green; Alvechurch
Chase Line
Route	tph	Calling at
Wolverhampton – Walsall	2	Coseley; Tipton; Dudley Port; Sandwell & Dudley; Smethwick Galton Bridge; Smethwick Rolfe Street; Birmingham New Street; Duddeston; Aston; Witton; Perry Barr; Hamstead; Tame Bridge Parkway; Bescot Stadium
Birmingham International – Rugeley Trent Valley	2	Marston Green; Lea Hall; Stechford; Adderley Park (1 tph); Birmingham New Street; Tame Bridge Parkway; Walsall; Bloxwich; Bloxwich North; Landywood; Cannock; Hednesford; Rugeley Town
Snow Hill lines
Route	tph	Calling at
Stratford-upon-Avon – Worcester Foregate Street via Dorridge	1	Stratford-upon-Avon Parkway; Lapworth; Dorridge; Widney Manor; Solihull; Olton; Acocks Green; Small Heath; Birmingham Moor Street; Birmingham Snow Hill; Jewellery Quarter; The Hawthorns; Smethwick Galton Bridge; Rowley Regis, Cradley Heath; Stourbridge Junction; Hagley; Blakedown; Kidderminster, Droitwich Spa; Worcester Shrub Hill
Stratford-upon-Avon – Kidderminster via Whitlocks End	1	Stratford-upon-Avon Parkway; Wilmcote; Wootton Wawen; Henley-in-Arden; Danzey; Wood End; The Lakes; Earlswood; Wythall; Whitlocks End; Shirley; Yardley Wood; Hall Green; Spring Road; Tyseley; Small Heath; Birmingham Moor Street; Birmingham Snow Hill; Jewellery Quarter; The Hawthorns; Smethwick Galton Bridge; Langley Green; Rowley Regis; Old Hill; Cradley Heath; Lye; Stourbridge Junction
Whitlocks End – Kidderminster	1	Shirley; Yardley Wood; Hall Green; Spring Road; Tyseley; Small Heath; Birmingham Moor Street, Birmingham Snow Hill; Jewellery Quarter; The Hawthorns; Smethwick Galton Bridge; Langley Green; Rowley Regis; Old Hill; Cradley Heath; Lye; Stourbridge Junction
Dorridge – Worcester Foregate Street	1	Widney Manor; Solihull; Olton; Acocks Green; Tyseley; Birmingham Moor Street; Birmingham Snow Hill; Jewellery Quarter; The Hawthorns; Smethwick Galton Bridge; Rowley Regis; Cradley Heath; Stourbridge Junction; Hagley; Blakedown; Kidderminster; Hartlebury, Droitwich Spa
Camp Hill Line
Route	tph	Calling at
Birmingham New Street – Kings Norton	2	Moseley Village; Kings Heath; Pineapple Road
Elephant & Bear Line
Route	tph	Calling at
Leamington Spa – Nuneaton	1	Kenilworth; Coventry; Coventry Arena; Bedworth; Bermuda Park
Stourbridge Shuttle
Route	tph	Calling at
Stourbridge Junction – Stourbridge Town	6	Shuttle service

== Political background ==
In the lead-up to the 2024 United Kingdom general election, the Labour Party of Keir Starmer committed itself to bring the passenger operations of the British rail network back under state ownership. Following its election win, the government introduced the Passenger Railway Services (Public Ownership) Act 2024 that received royal assent in November 2024.

In July 2025, the government announced that DfT Operator would take over responsibility for passenger services from Transport UK Group and Mitsui & Co on 1 February 2026. (Although the process is sometimes described as "nationalisation", this is in contrast to the previous "privatisation" rather than any compulsory acquisition. Formally, the outsourcing contract ("franchise") was merely not renewed when it reached its end-date, and employed staff were transferred to the successor company at their existing terms and conditions in accordance with the TUPE regulations.)

== Rolling Stock ==
=== Fleet ===
Family	Class	Image	Type	Top speed		Number	Carriages	Routes operated	Built
Family	Class	Image	Type	mph	km/h	Number	Carriages	Routes operated	Built
Shunting locomotive
	08		Shunter	15	24	2	N/A	Stock movements	1952–1962
West Midlands Railway
Parry People Mover	139		Railcar	20	32	2	1	Stourbridge Town branch line	2009
Bombardier Turbostar	172		DMU	100	161	8	2	Birmingham–Hereford; Snow Hill lines	2010
Bombardier Turbostar	172		DMU	100	161	4	2	Birmingham–Hereford; Snow Hill lines	2011
Bombardier Turbostar	172		DMU	100	161	12	2	Birmingham–Hereford; Snow Hill lines	2011
Bombardier Turbostar	172		DMU	100	161	15	3	Birmingham–Hereford; Snow Hill lines	2011
CAF Civity	196		DMU	100	161	12	2	Birmingham–Shrewsbury; Birmingham–Hereford; Camp Hill line; Leamington Spa to Nuneaton	2019–2020
CAF Civity	196		DMU	100	161	14	4	Birmingham–Shrewsbury; Birmingham–Hereford; Camp Hill line; Leamington Spa to Nuneaton	2019–2020
Bombardier Aventra	Class 730/0 Landmark		EMU	90	145	48	3	Wolverhampton – Walsall via Birmingham New Street; Cross-City Line; Chase Line	2021–2023
London Northwestern Railway
Sprinter	150		DMU	75	121	3	2	Marston Vale line	1985–1986
Siemens Desiro	350		EMU	110	177	50	4	Abbey Line; Birmingham New Street–Northampton; Stafford–Crewe via Stoke-on-Trent; London Euston–Tring/Milton Keynes Central; London Euston–Northampton; London Euston–Crewe via Trent Valley Line; London Euston–Birmingham New Street; Birmingham New Street–Liverpool Lime Street; London Euston–Walsall	2004–2014
Bombardier Aventra	Class 730/0 Landmark		EMU	90	145	48	3	London Euston – Tring/Milton Keynes Central	2021–2023
Bombardier Aventra	Class 730/2		EMU	110	177	36	5	Birmingham New Street–Northampton; London Euston–Tring/Milton Keynes Central; London Euston–Northampton; London Euston–Crewe via Trent Valley Line; London Euston–Birmingham New Street	2021–2024
