= Arley and Fillongley railway station =

Disused railway station in Old Arley, Warwickshire, England

Coordinates: 52.49844°N 1.59747°W

Arley and Fillongley
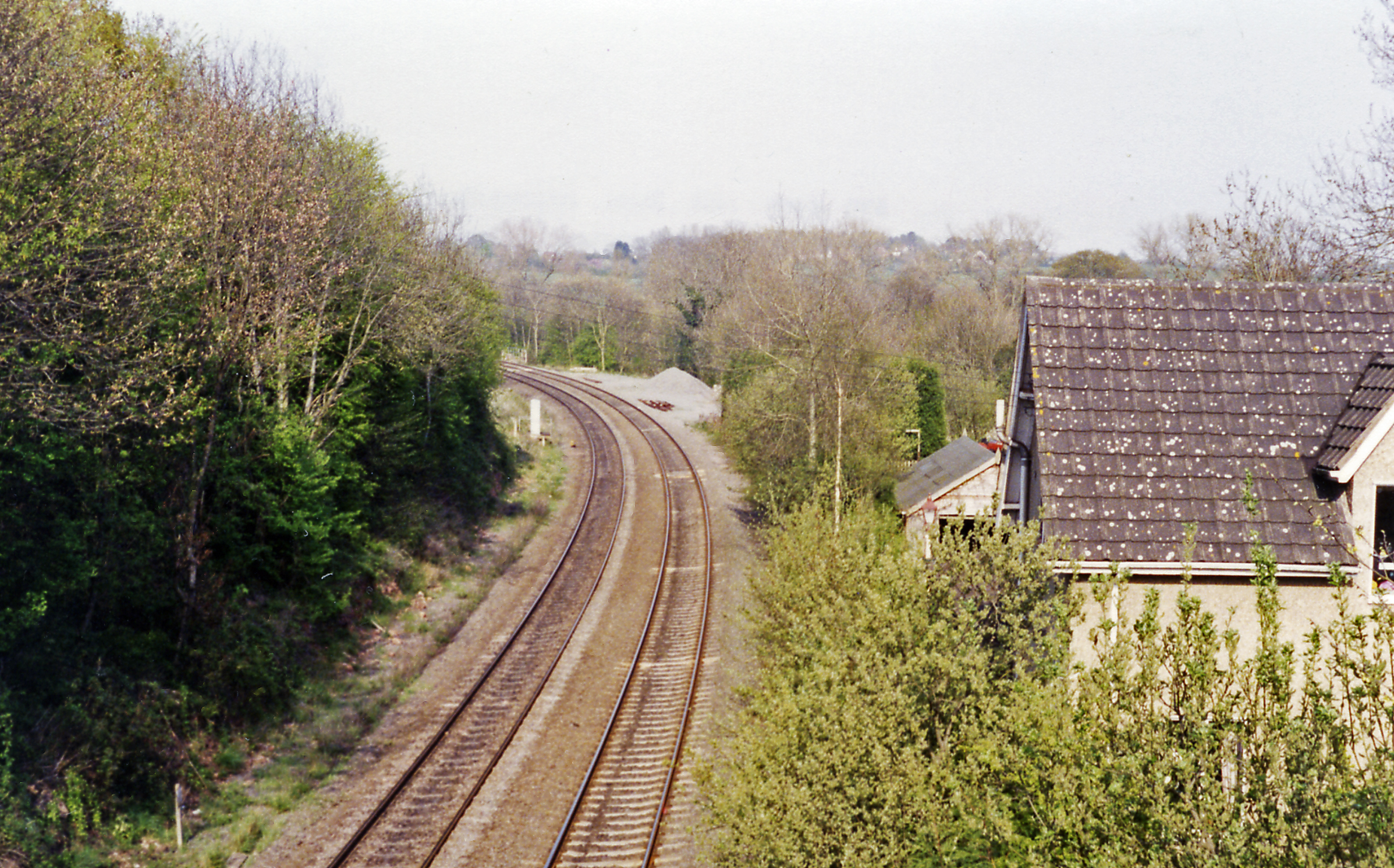
- Site of the station in April 1995

General information
- Location: Old Arley, North Warwickshire; England
- Platforms: 2

Other information
- Status: Disused

History
- Original company: Midland Railway
- Pre-grouping: Midland Railway
- Post-grouping: London Midland and Scottish Railway

Key dates
- 1 November 1864: Station opened as Arley
- 1 March 1867: Name changed to Arley and Fillongley
- 7 November 1960: Station closed
Location

Arley and Fillongley railway station was a station on the Midland Railway, which operated in the Midland county of Warwickshire, in England.

== History ==
The station was opened by the Midland Railway, and was absorbed by the London Midland and Scottish Railway during the Grouping of 1923. Passing on to the London Midland Region of British Railways on nationalisation in 1948, it was then closed by the British Transport Commission.

== Present day ==
The station master's house still exists as a private residence. Trains on the Birmingham to Peterborough Line still pass the site.

Preceding station	Historical railways	Following station
Shustoke	Midland Railway; Birmingham-Peterborough line	Stockingford
