= Nuneaton Abbey Street railway station =

Former railway station in England

Coordinates: 52.528944°N 1.480484°W

Nuneaton Abbey Street
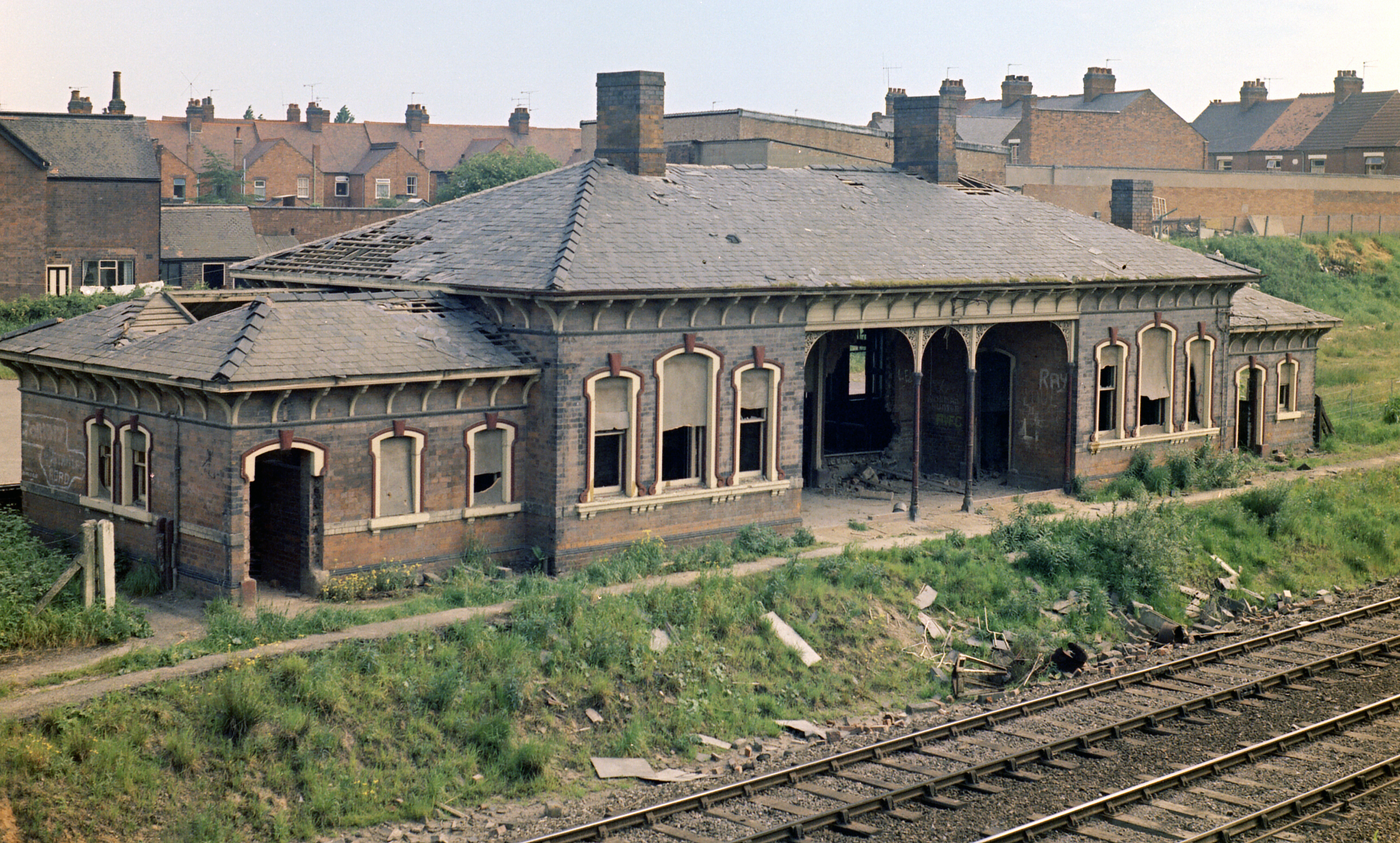
- The derelict main building of Abbey Street station in 1975, seven years after closure, the platforms had been removed by this time, and the building is awaiting demolition.

General information
- Location: Midland Road, Nuneaton; England
- Platforms: 2

Other information
- Status: Disused

History
- Pre-grouping: Midland Railway

Key dates
- 1 December 1864: Opened as Nuneaton Midland
- 1 September 1873: Rebuilt and relocated
- 2 June 1924: Renamed Nuneaton Abbey Street
- 4 March 1968: Closed
Location

Nuneaton Abbey Street was the second main railway station serving Nuneaton in Warwickshire, England. It operated between 1864 and its closure in 1968. The other main station is Nuneaton Trent Valley which is still open, but now known as simply Nuneaton. The station served the Birmingham-Nuneaton-Leicester Line and also the now closed Ashby and Nuneaton Joint Railway.

It was originally opened on 1 December 1864 by the Midland Railway on their line from Birmingham to Nuneaton. The station was rebuilt in a slightly different location in 1873 when the Ashby and Nuneaton Joint Railway was opened. The station was designed by the Midland Railway company architect John Holloway Sanders.

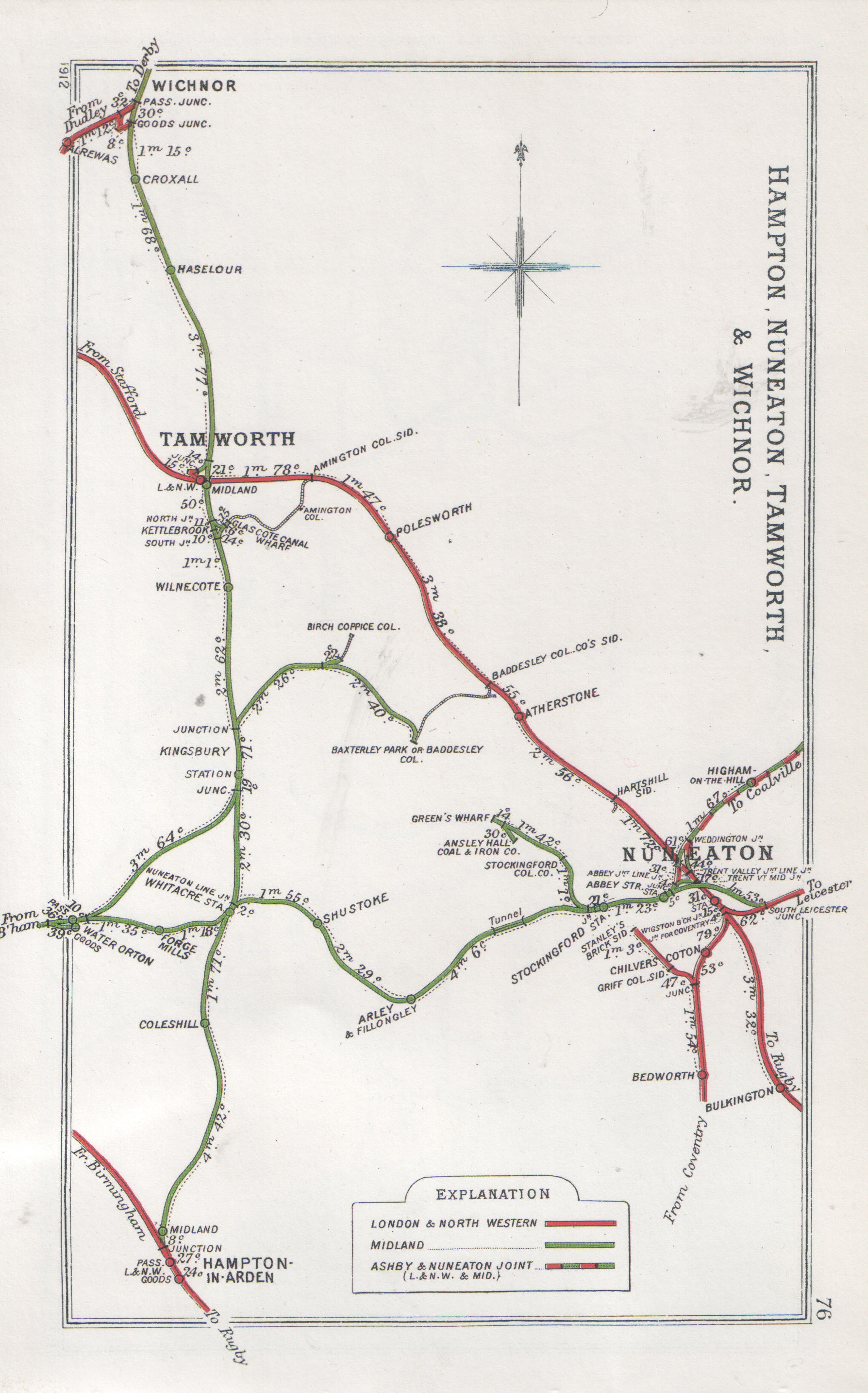
1912 map showing the railways around Nuneaton, and the location of the station.

Until 2 June 1924 it was known as Nuneaton Midland. It was renamed as Nuneaton Abbey Street to avoid confusion with Trent Valley station when the Midland Railway and the London and North Western Railway were grouped to create the London, Midland and Scottish Railway (LMS). The station came under the control of British Railways in 1948.

The station was closed on 4 March 1968, and all services were diverted through Trent Valley station. Today, trains still run past the site of the station on the Birmingham-Leicester-Peterborough Line, but little physical trace of the station remains, as the platforms and most of the station buildings have been removed. In 2018 the only remaining remnant of the station was a former waiting room, now within a private garden.

| Preceding station | Historical railways | Following station |
|---|---|---|
| Terminus | Midland Railway, London and North Western Railway; Ashby and Nuneaton Joint Railway | Higham on the Hill; Line and station closed |
| Stockingford; Line open, station closed | London, Midland and Scottish Railway; Birmingham to Leicester Line | Hinckley; Line and station open |
