= Bermuda, Warwickshire =

Suburb of Nuneaton, Warwickshire, England

Coordinates: 52.506°N 1.481°W

Bermuda
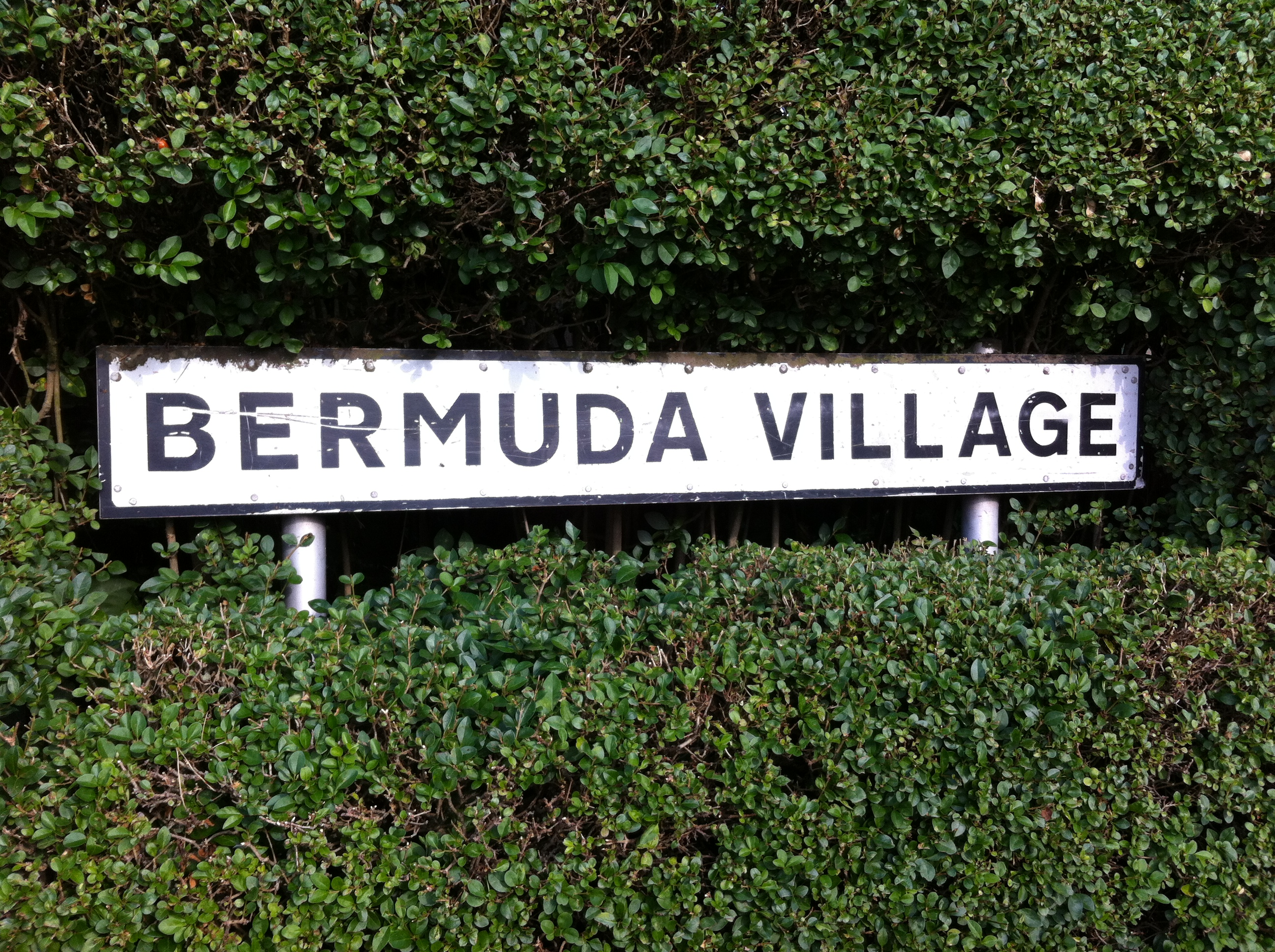
- OS grid reference: SP 35 89
- District: Nuneaton and Bedworth
- Shire county: Warwickshire
- Region: West Midlands
- Country: England
- Sovereign state: United Kingdom
- Post town: Nuneaton
- Postcode district: CV10
- Dialling code: 0247
- Police: Warwickshire
- Fire: Warwickshire
- Ambulance: West Midlands
- UK Parliament: Nuneaton

Bermuda is a suburb of Nuneaton in the English county of Warwickshire.

Bermuda was originally a small pit village built in 1893 to house workers for the Griff Colliery Company's new mine, "Griff Clara". The village initially consisted of ninety miners' houses, a working men's club, and a mission hall. The new construction replaced the former workers' housing, known as "the Old Row". Bermuda was named for local landowner Edward Newdegate, a former Governor of Bermuda. The village was constructed next to local transportation and industrial infrastructure, including the Griff Arm of the Coventry Canal and the Stanley Brickworks.

Bermuda Village itself is preserved by planning regulations as an "area of restraint", meaning that no major redevelopment should take place in the village itself.

The Bermuda Park housing estate was built on land next to Bermuda Village in the mid-2000s. The estate has a nature and wildlife park set around a balancing lake. The estate backs onto open countryside near Arbury Hall and a large industrial and leisure park and is supported by Bermuda Park Community, an organisation focussed on improving the quality of life for residents of the area. Bermuda Park railway station was opened in 2016.

The village made it to national and even international headlines in 1972 when a large dump of cyanide was discovered on a children's playground, probably sourced from the local car industry. This eventually lead to a change in legislation that made dumping dangerous waste illegal.

== Bermuda Business Park ==
Bermuda Business Park is located south of the Bermuda Park housing estate on the A444 ‘Griff Lane’. The leisure section has an Odeon cinema, a Nuffield Fitness & Wellbeing Gym, a bowling alley, a nursery and soft play area (operated by Nuneaton & Bedworth Leisure Trust), Tim Hortons (which in 2022 replaced a Frankie and Benny's), Holiday Inn Express, KFC, McDonalds, Starbucks, Subway and the Middlemarch Farm pub restaurant, operated under the Farmhouse Inns brand of Greene King. On 22 October 2017, an armed man stormed into the bowling alley and took many hostages.

Unipart Logistics, RS Group, Saputo Dairy UK (formerly Dairy Crest) and Gist Logistics (the distribution arm of Marks and Spencer) are among businesses represented on the park.
