= Shustoke railway station =

Former railway station in England

Shustoke

General information
- Location: England
- Coordinates: 52.5181°N 1.6413°W
- Platforms: 2

Other information
- Status: Disused

History
- Original company: Midland Railway
- Post-grouping: London, Midland and Scottish Railway

Key dates
- 1 November 1864: Opened
- 4 March 1968: Closed
Location

Shustoke was a railway station on what is now the Birmingham to Peterborough Line between Whitacre Junction (now closed) and Arley and Fillongley (also closed).

Preceding station	Historical railways	Following station
Whitacre Junction; Line open, station closed	Midland Railway; Birmingham to Leicester Line	Arley and Fillongley; Line open, station closed
