= Chilvers Coton railway station =

Former railway station in England

Coordinates: 52.512026°N 1.470451°W

Chilvers Coton

General information
- Location: Chilvers Coton, Nuneaton; England
- Platforms: 2

Other information
- Status: Disused

History
- Pre-grouping: London and North Western Railway
- Post-grouping: London, Midland and Scottish Railway

Key dates
- 2 September 1850: Opened
- 18 January 1965: Closed
Location

Chilvers Coton was a railway station on the Coventry to Nuneaton Line, which served the Chilvers Coton area of Nuneaton, south of the town centre. It opened in 1850, along with the line, and was closed in 1965 when passenger services on the route were withdrawn.

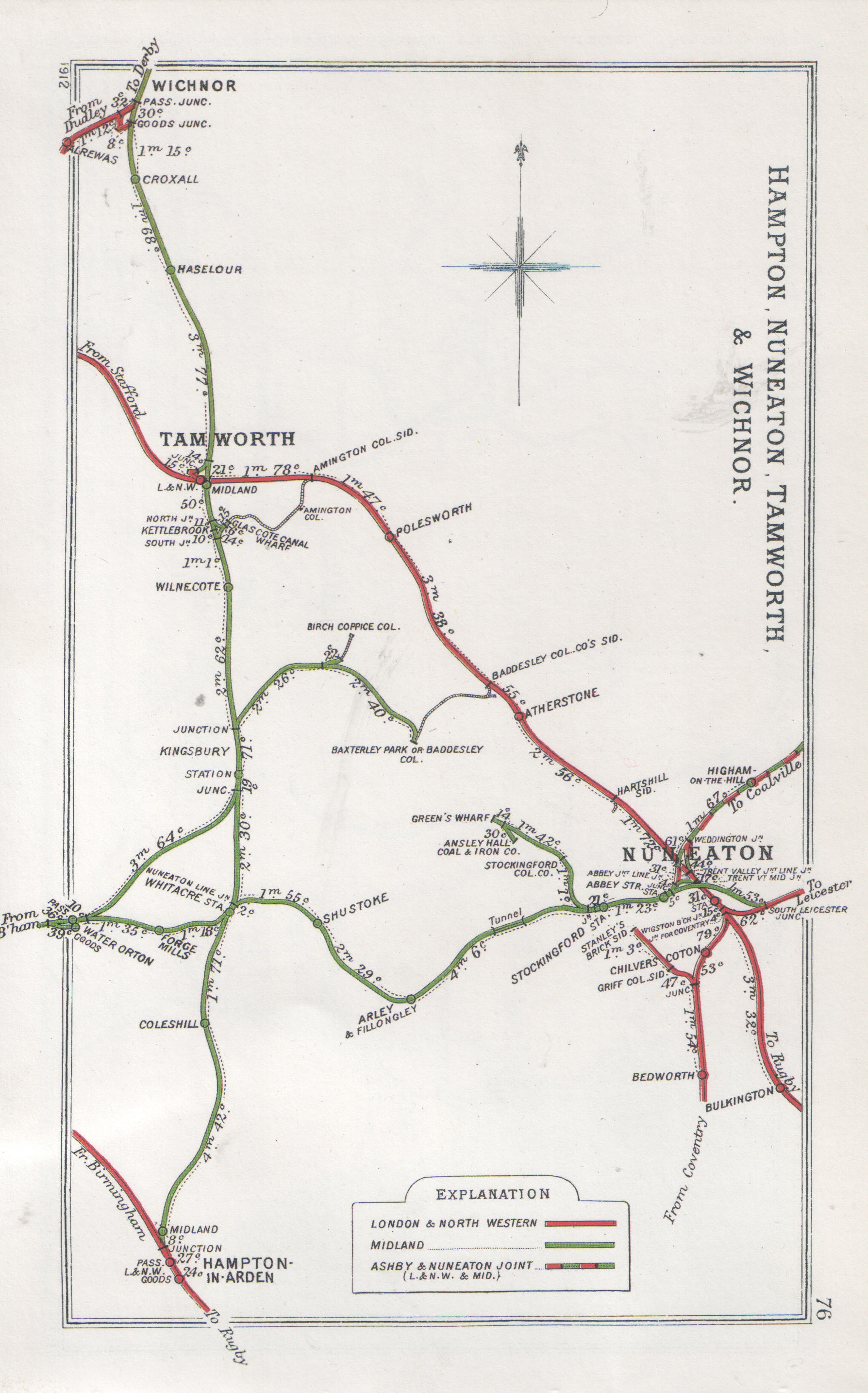
1912 map showing the railways around Nuneaton, and the location of the station.

It was located in a cutting, just north of the point where the railway passed under College Street.

The station was originally opened by the London and North Western Railway (LNWR) it came under the ownership of the London, Midland and Scottish Railway (LMS) in 1923, and then British Railways in 1948. It was closed under the Beeching Axe.

In January 2016, a new station, Bermuda Park was opened on the same line, around 1/2 mile (800 m) to the south of the site of Chilvers Coton station.

Preceding station	Historical railways	Following station
Bedworth; Line and station open	London and North Western Railway; Coventry–Nuneaton line	Nuneaton; Line and station open
