= Elephant & Bear Line =

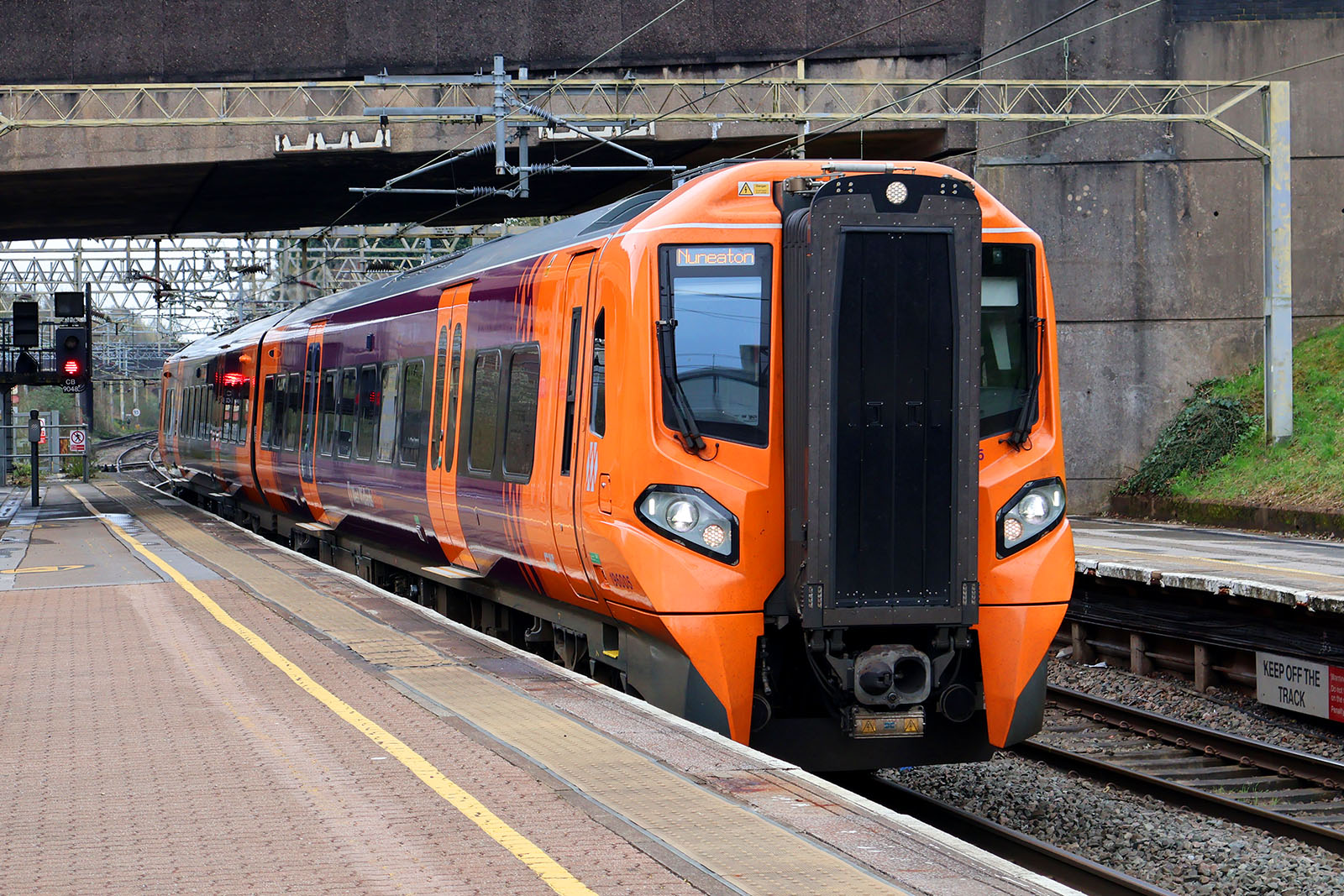
- Class 196 at Coventry.

Overview
- Status: Operational
- Owner: Network Rail
- Locale: Warwickshire, West Midlands (county)
- Termini: Royal Leamington Spa; Nuneaton
- Stations: 7

Service
- Type: Heavy rail
- System: National Rail
- Operator: West Midlands Trains
- Rolling stock: Class 196

History
- Opened: 1854
- Last extension: 2016

Technical
- Number of tracks: 1 (Leamington to Coventry) 2 (Coventry to Nuneaton)
- Track gauge: 4 ft 8 1/2 in (1,435 mm)

The Elephant & Bear Line is a rail route in the West Midlands, running from Royal Leamington Spa to Nuneaton via Coventry.

== Route ==
The route runs at an hourly frequency in each direction calling at the following stations:

- Nuneaton
- Bermuda Park (Nuneaton)
- Bedworth
- Coventry Arena
- Coventry
- Kenilworth
- Leamington Spa

== History ==
The railway line was opened as two distinct parts between Coventry and Leamington and Coventry and Nuneaton. The line to Leamington was opened in 1844, and completed in 1854. The line to Nuneaton was opened in 1850. Both lines were under the ownership of the London and North Western Railway (LNWR). However, in January 1965 the local passenger service was removed due to the Beeching Axe, and all of the intermediate stations were closed. Passenger services between Coventry and Leamington were restored in 1977, followed in 1988, by passenger services between Coventry and Nuneaton, with a reopened station at Bedworth.

In January 2016 two new stations were opened at Bermuda Park and Coventry Arena. Kenilworth Station, located between Leamington and Coventry, reopened in April 2018; the station had been closed for 51 years. During April 2023, it was announced that the line was going to be called the Elephant and Bear Line following a public vote, referring to the symbols of Coventry and Warwickshire, and station signage on the line can be seen with the lines named on.

== Rolling Stock ==
Services were formerly operated using Class 153s. However, two-car Class 196 trains are now used on the line.
