= Nuneaton railway station =

Railway station in Warwickshire, England

Nuneaton
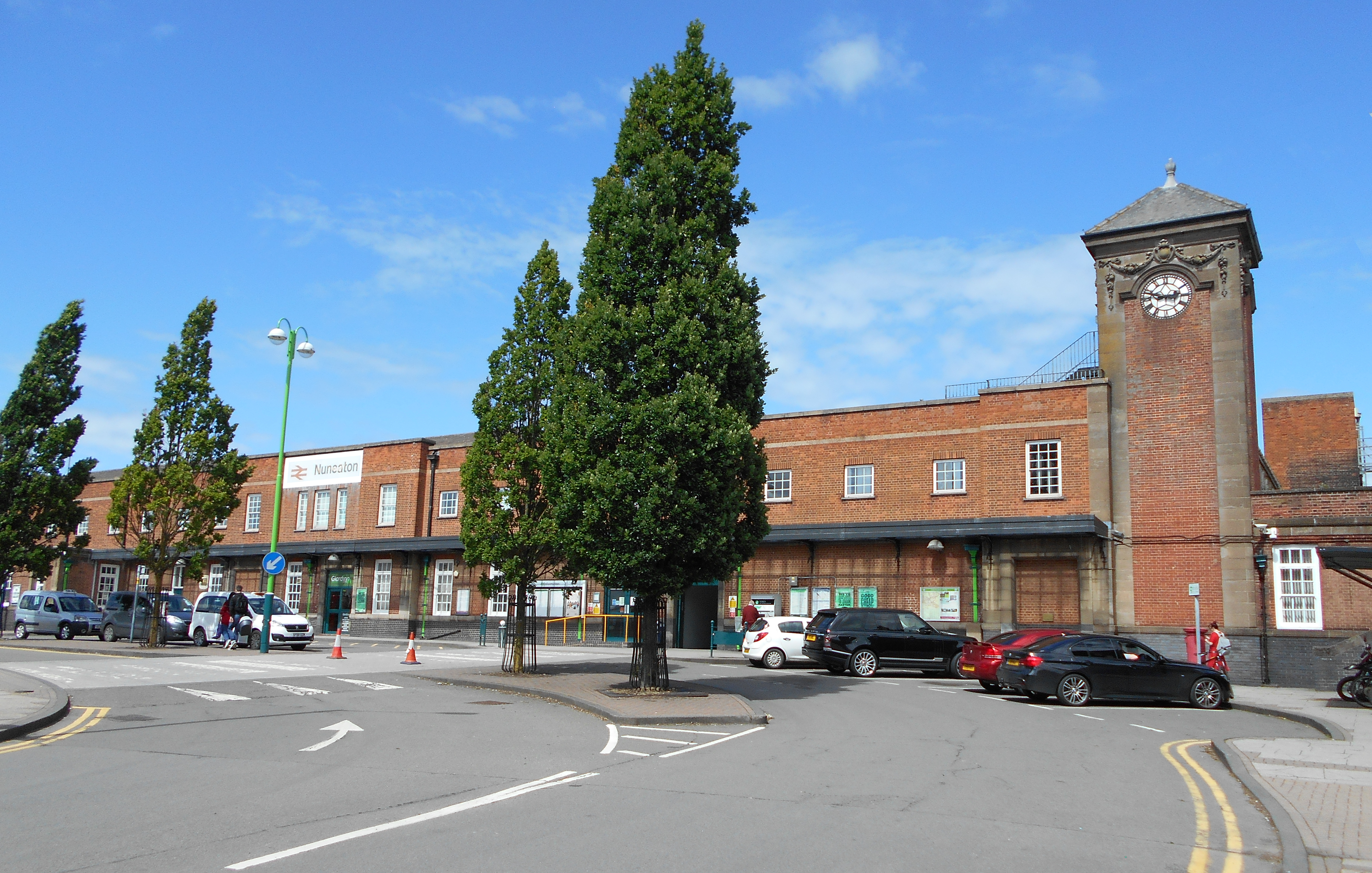
- Station forecourt

General information
- Location: Nuneaton, Nuneaton and Bedworth; England
- Coordinates: 52°31′35″N 1°27′49″W
- Grid reference: SP364921
- Manager: London Northwestern Railway
- Platforms: 7

Other information
- Station code: NUN
- Classification: DfT category C1

History
- Original company: London and North Western Railway
- Pre-grouping: London and North Western Railway
- Post-grouping: London, Midland and Scottish Railway

Key dates
- 15 September 1847: Opened as Nuneaton
- 1873: Rebuilt and enlarged
- 1915: Rebuilt and enlarged
- 2 June 1924: Renamed Nuneaton Trent Valley
- 5 May 1969: Renamed Nuneaton
- 2004: Platforms 6 & 7 added

Passengers
- 2021/22: ▲0.844 million
- Interchange: ▲0.320 million
- 2022/23: ▲0.960 million
- Interchange: ▲0.499 million
- 2023/24: ▲1.159 million
- Interchange: ▲0.524 million
- 2024/25: ▲1.354 million
- Interchange: ▲0.601 million
- 2025/26: ▲1.407 million
- Interchange: ▲0.652 million
Location
Notes
- Passenger statistics from the Office of Rail and Road

Nuneaton railway station serves the market town of Nuneaton, in Warwickshire, England; it is managed by West Midlands Trains. The station is served by three railway lines: the Trent Valley section of the West Coast Main Line (WCML), the Birmingham-Leicester-Peterborough line and the Coventry to Nuneaton branch line. During the period 1924–1969, it was known as Nuneaton Trent Valley, to distinguish it from the now closed Nuneaton Abbey Street station. The station lies on the north-eastern edge of Nuneaton town centre, just outside the ring road.

== History ==
=== 19th and 20th century ===
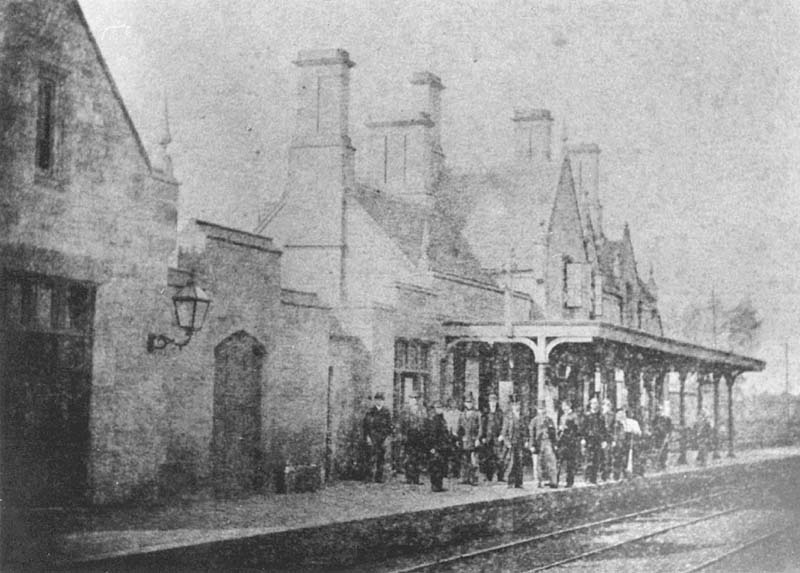
Photograph of the original Nuneaton station of 1847. This was rebuilt in 1873 and again in 1915

The original Nuneaton station was opened on 15 September 1847, when the London and North Western Railway (LNWR) opened the Trent Valley Line; the branch line to Coventry opened in 1850. The original station, like many others on the line, had been designed by John William Livock. A simple two platform structure, it became inadequate to cope with the growing traffic, and was rebuilt on a larger scale with extra platforms in 1873. It was rebuilt and enlarged again in 1915, with its current buildings designed by Reginald Wynn Owen; the most prominent feature of which is the clock tower.

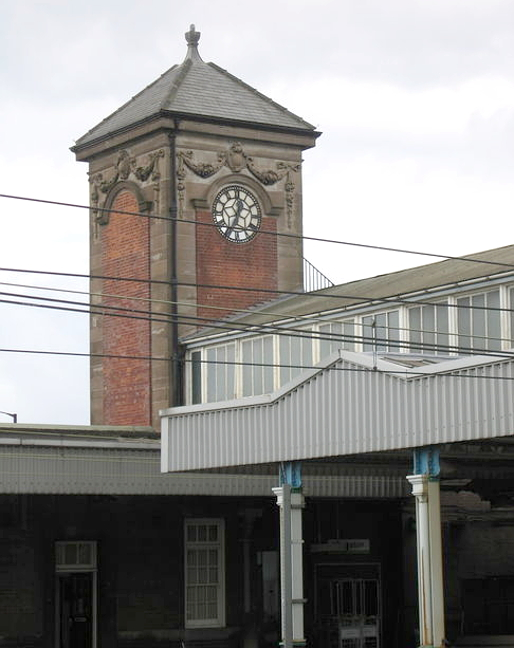
The station clock tower, dating from 1915

In 1873, another line had opened: the Ashby and Nuneaton Joint Railway, to link Ashby-de-la-Zouch and Coalville in order to access the large coal reserves located there. The line was closed to passengers in 1931, but remained open for goods until 1971. Part of it was later reopened as the heritage Battlefield Line.

A second station in the town, Nuneaton Midland, had been opened by the Midland Railway in 1864 on the line between Birmingham and Leicester. When both the LNWR and Midland Railway became part of the London, Midland and Scottish Railway (LMS) in 1924, both stations were renamed; the present station became known as Nuneaton Trent Valley and the former Midland station becoming Nuneaton Abbey Street. Abbey Street station was closed in 1968 and the present station reverted to being called just Nuneaton; it took on the Birmingham to Leicester services.

Other stations serving Nuneaton included the aforementioned Abbey Street and two suburban stations at Stockingford, on the line towards Birmingham, and Chilvers Coton on the line to Coventry. These were all closed in the 1960s, on implementation of the 1963 Reshaping of British Railways report, leaving only the present station. In addition, on 18 January 1965, the Coventry – Nuneaton line closed to passengers, reopening to passengers in 1988. In 2016, a new station in Nuneaton, Bermuda Park, was opened on this line.

=== 21st century ===
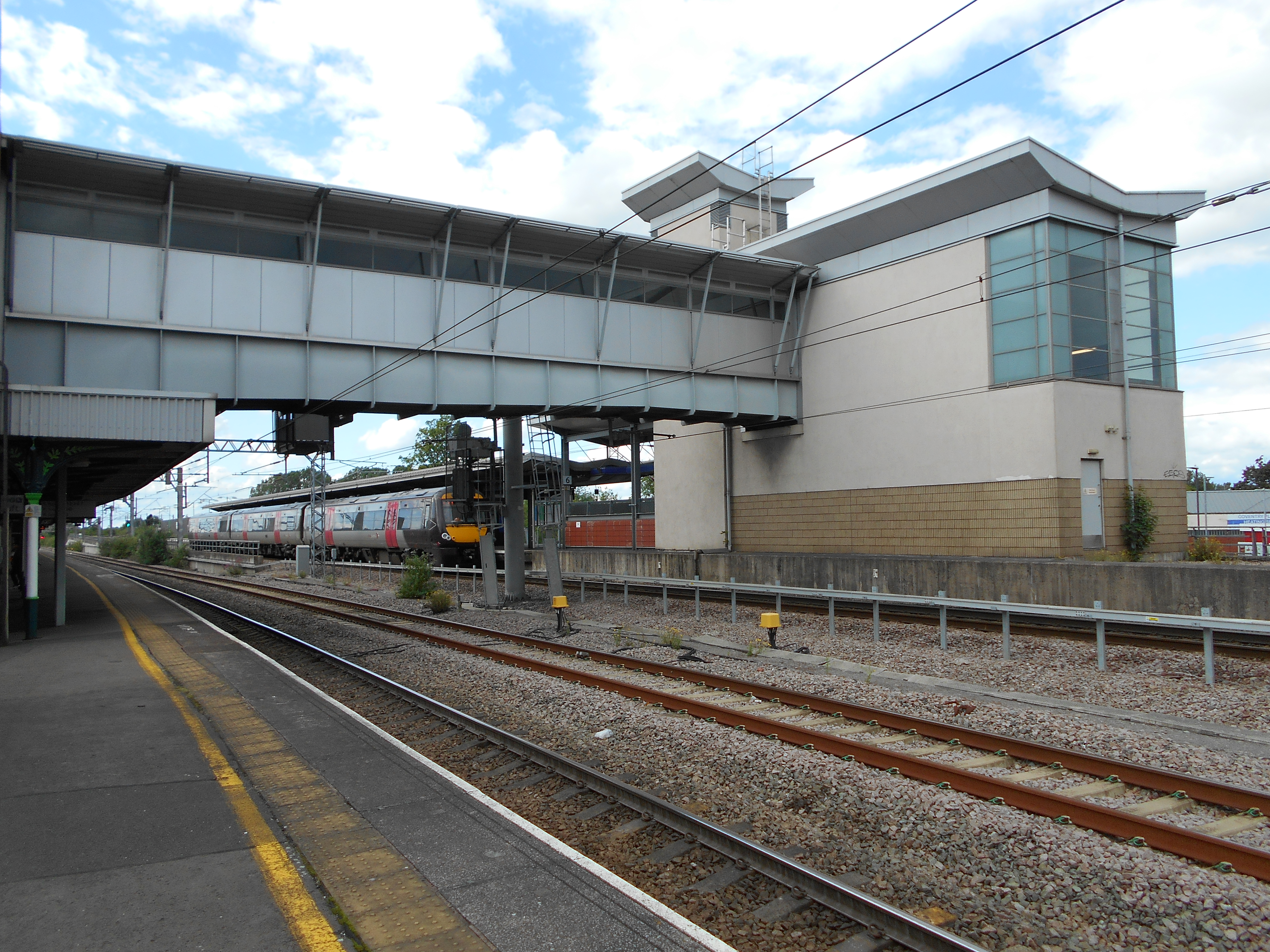
Platforms 6 and 7 were added in 2004, served by the Birmingham-Leicester-Peterborough Line

In 2004, Network Rail built two new platforms, numbered 6 and 7, on the eastern side of the station. These were built on the site of the former station goods yard as part of a grade separation project to separate trains on the Birmingham to Peterborough line from those on the WCML; this was to avoid the need for Birmingham-Leicester trains to cause conflicting movements by running across the WCML on the level. A disused flyover north of the station, which carries the Birmingham to Peterborough line over the WCML, was restored to use; a connection was built between this and the new platforms, which were dedicated to the Birmingham-Leicester-East Anglia services.

In November 2012, the 0.9 mile Nuneaton North Chord opened to the north of the station. The chord allows freight trains approaching Nuneaton from Felixstowe, via the Birmingham–Peterborough line, to join the northbound WCML after crossing the flyover, allowing them to avoid conflicts with southbound main line trains.

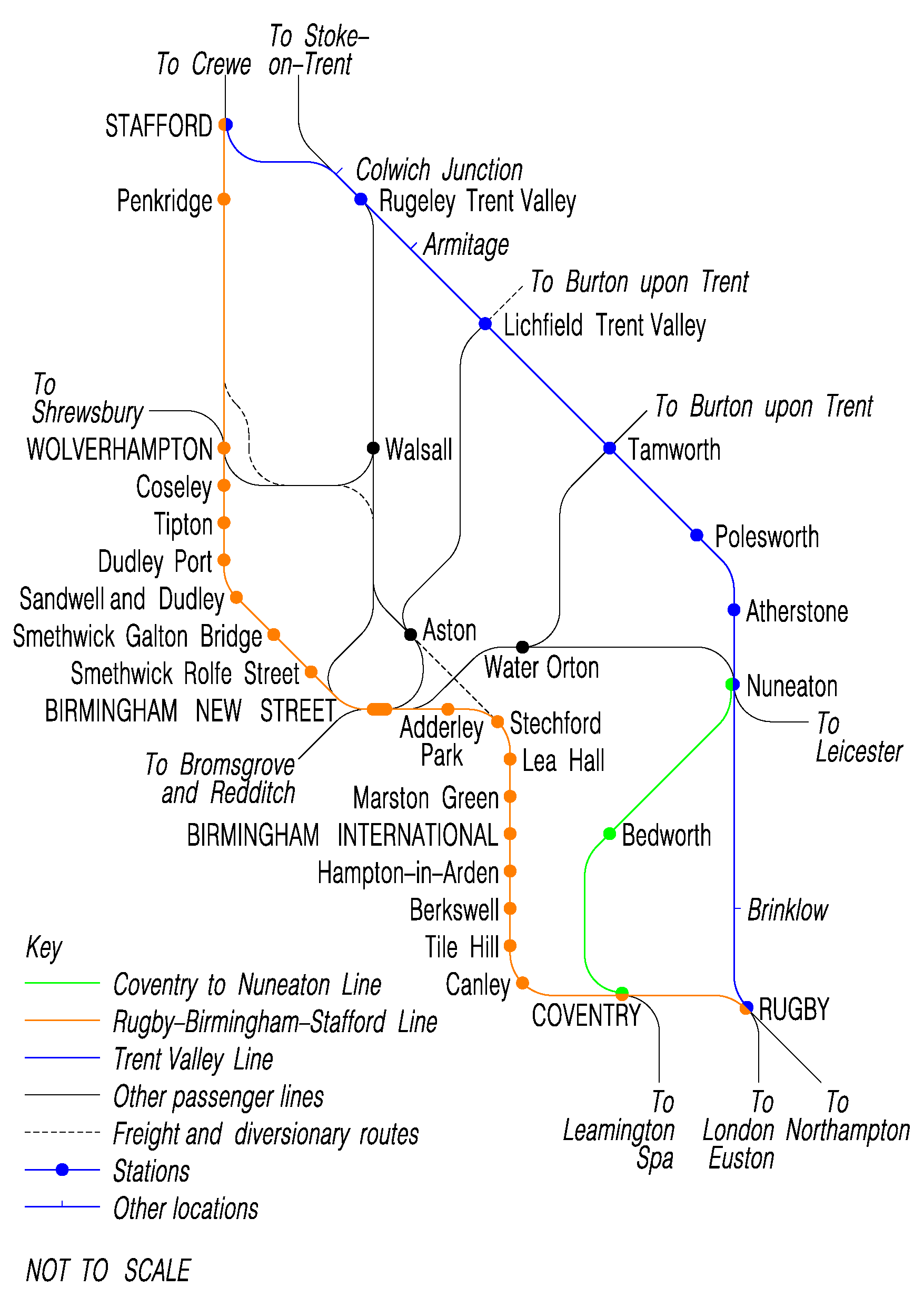
Map showing the railways around Nuneaton

=== Accident in 1975 ===
In the early hours of 6 June 1975, an overnight sleeper train from London to Glasgow Central derailed and crashed just south of Nuneaton station, killing six people and injuring 38. It was caused when the train ran onto a length of temporary track with a speed restriction at too high a speed. Lighting equipment illuminating a board giving advance warning of the speed restriction failed; this led the driver to wrongly conclude that it had been lifted, so he failed to slow down.

One of the Class 86 locomotives mounted the platform, causing damage to the station. A plaque commemorating the victims of the crash was unveiled at the station in August 2015.

=== Motive Power depot ===
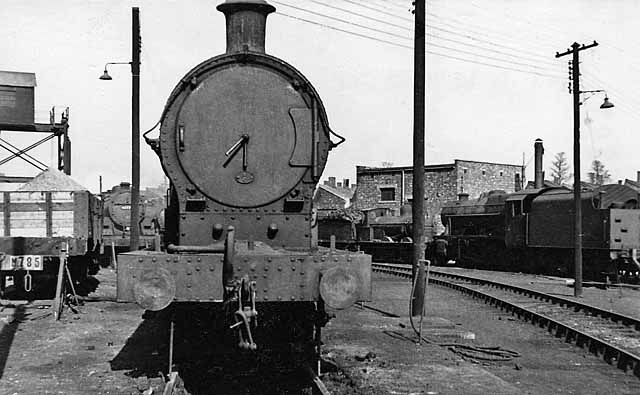
The locomotive yard at Nuneaton depot in 1953

The LNWR opened a small locomotive depot in 1847, which was used until 1878 when it was replaced by a larger facility. The engine sheds were doubled in size in 1888 and enlarged still further in 1892. This was an important freight depot for the WCML and its connections at Trent Valley station, also catering for local passenger services. It was located to the south of the station between the main line and that to Coventry. The depot closed 6 June 1966 and has since been demolished.

== Layout and facilities ==
The station has a total of seven through platforms, consisting of one side platform (platform 1) on the western side of the station and three island platforms containing platforms 2 to 7; all are linked by a footbridge which has full lift access.

The main station building is adjacent to platform one and contains the main facilities, including a staffed ticket office and a cafe shop.

== Services ==
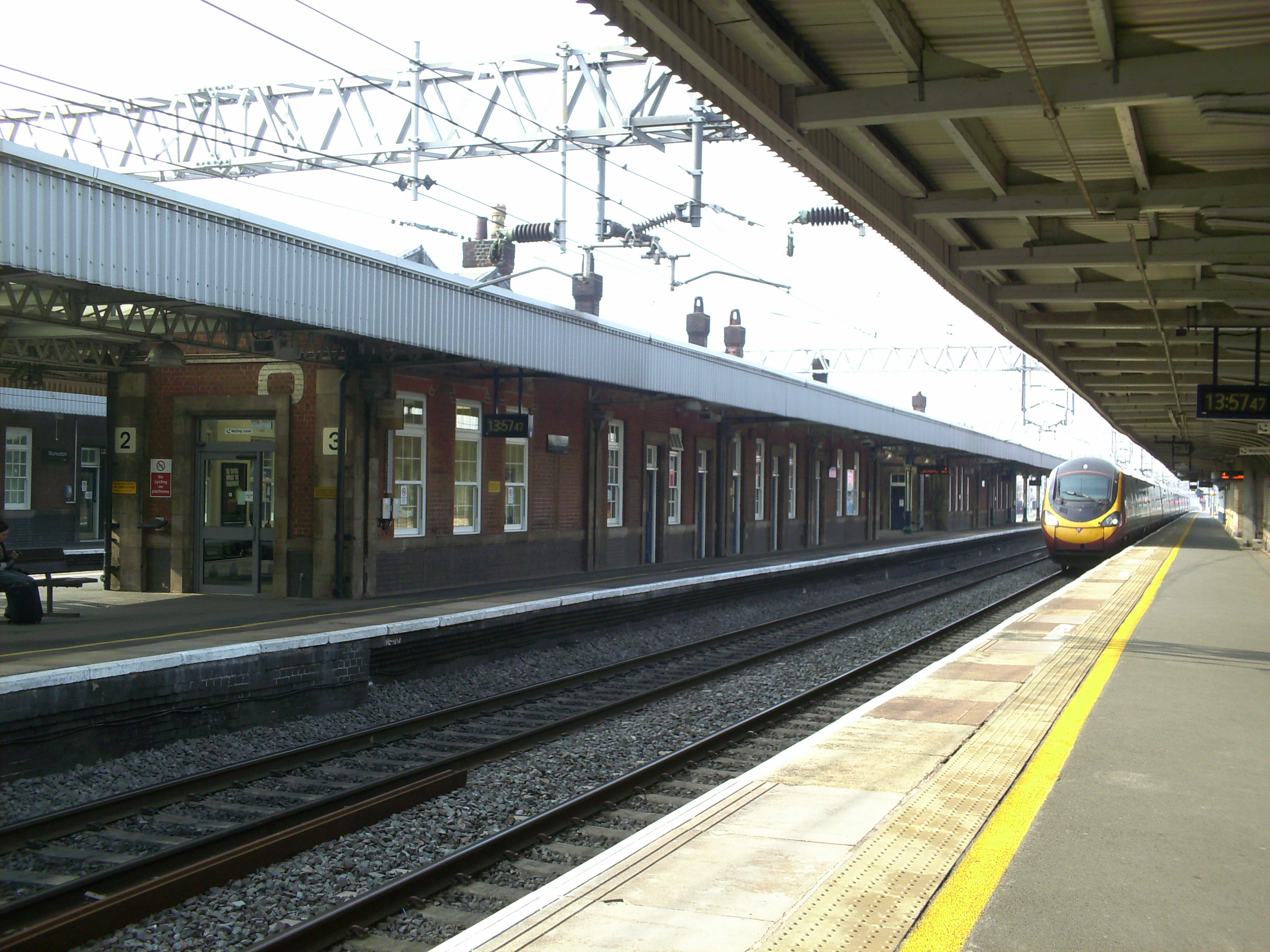
A Virgin Trains Class 390 Pendolino arrives at the platform

=== West Coast Main Line ===
West Midlands Trains, under its London Northwestern Railway brand, operates an hourly service: southbound to London Euston, via Rugby and Milton Keynes Central, and northbound to Crewe, calling at all stations except Polesworth (other than one daily service).

Avanti West Coast also operates an hourly service: southbound to London Euston non-stop and northbound to Manchester Piccadilly, via Stoke-on-Trent and Stockport.

Lumo services from London Euston to Stirling call here, operated by Class 222s.

=== Birmingham–Peterborough line ===
CrossCountry operates two trains per hour: westbound to Birmingham New Street and eastbound to Leicester; one of these continues to Stansted Airport, via Peterborough and Cambridge. All services on this line use platforms 6 and 7.

=== Elephant & Bear Line ===
West Midlands Trains also provides an hourly service southbound to Leamington Spa, via Bedworth, Coventry and Kenilworth; this normally uses platform 1. Since 2023, this route has been branded as the Elephant & Bear Line.

Preceding station	National Rail	Following station
Coleshill Parkway	CrossCountry Birmingham-Leicester	Hinckley
Coleshill Parkway	CrossCountry Birmingham-Stansted Airport	Leicester
Crewe	Lumo; London Euston to Stirling	Milton Keynes Central
Bermuda Park	West Midlands Railway Leamington - Coventry – Nuneaton	Terminus
Atherstone towards Crewe	London Northwestern Railway London–Crewe	Rugby towards London Euston
Stoke-On-Trent	Avanti West Coast Manchester Piccadilly – London	London Euston
Crewe	Avanti West Coast Liverpool – London	Milton Keynes Central
Stafford	Avanti West Coast WCML Trent Valley services	London Euston
Stafford	Avanti West Coast WCML Trent Valley services	Rugby
Crewe	Avanti West Coast WCML Trent Valley services	Milton Keynes Central

== See also ==
- Bermuda Park railway station
- Chilvers Coton railway station
- Felixstowe to Nuneaton railway upgrade
- Nuneaton Abbey Street railway station
- Stockingford railway station
