= Bedworth railway station =

Railway station in Warwickshire, England

Coordinates: 52.479°N 1.467°W

Bedworth
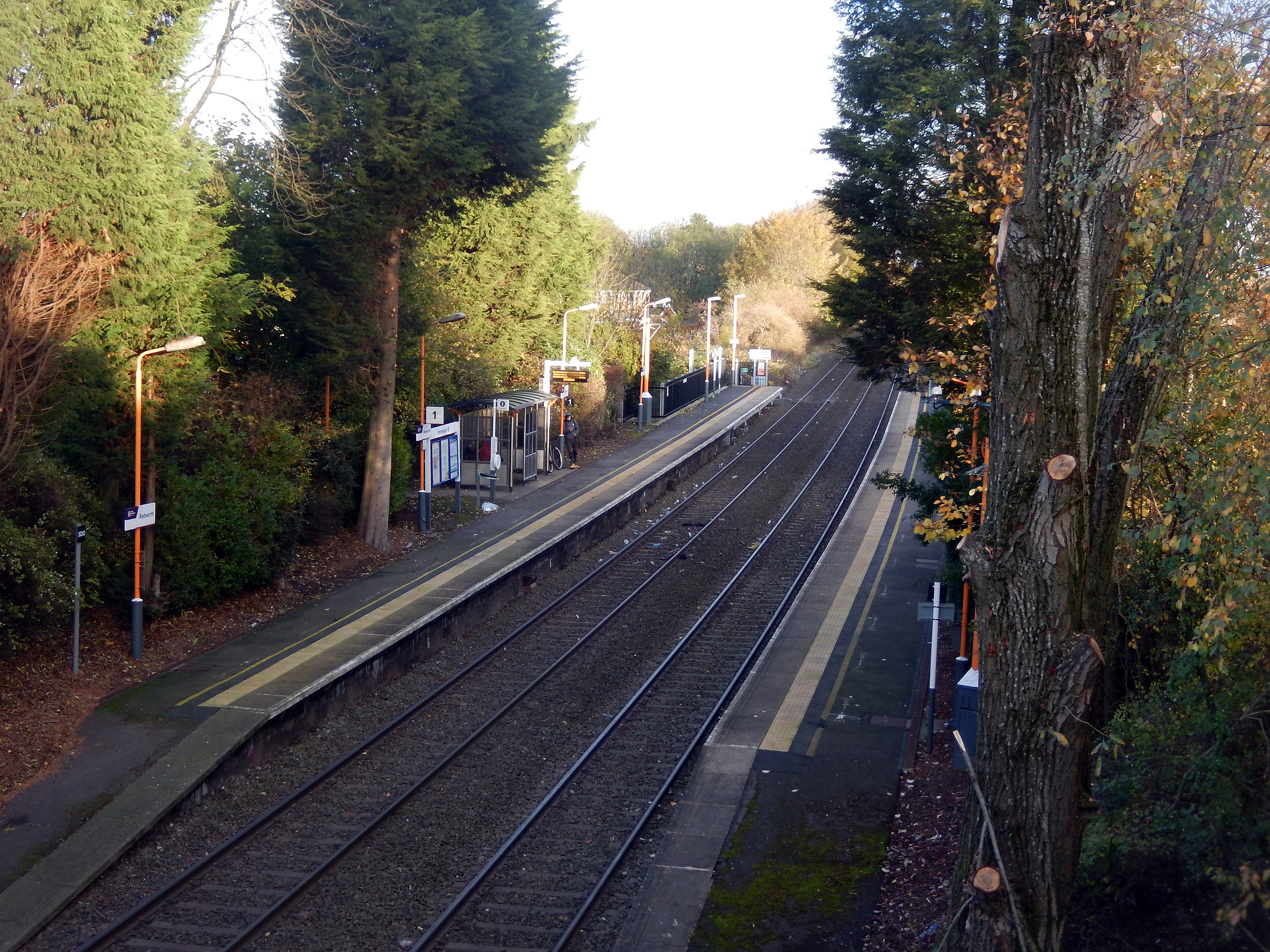
- Bedworth railway station

General information
- Location: Bedworth, Nuneaton and Bedworth, England
- Grid reference: SP362869
- Manager: West Midlands Railway
- Platforms: 2

Other information
- Station code: BEH
- Classification: DfT category F2

History
- Pre-grouping: London and North Western Railway
- Post-grouping: London, Midland and Scottish Railway

Key dates
- 12 September 1850: Opened
- 18 January 1965: Closed
- 16 May 1988: Reopened

Passengers
- 2021/22: ▲38,414
- 2022/23: ▲54,536
- 2023/24: ▼52,904
- 2024/25: ▲69,046
- 2025/26: ▲93,456
Location
Notes
- Passenger statistics from the Office of Rail and Road

Bedworth railway station serves the town of Bedworth, in Warwickshire, England. It is on the Coventry to Nuneaton Line, 6.25 miles (10 km) north of Coventry. The station, and all trains serving it, are operated by West Midlands Trains.

== History ==
=== Original station ===
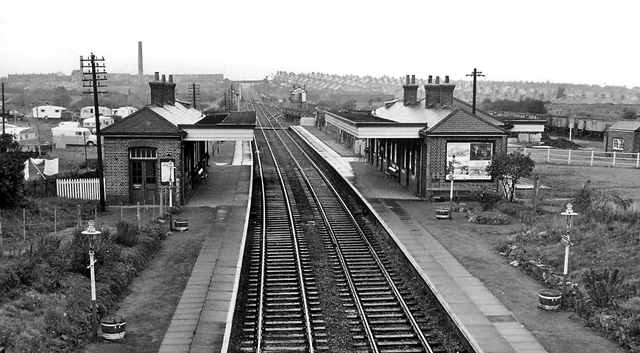
The original Bedworth station in 1961. It was closed in 1965.

The original Bedworth station operated between 1850 and 1965. The London and North Western Railway (LNWR) opened the station, along with the Coventry to Nuneaton line on 12 September 1850. The station building was rebuilt some time between 1912 and 1923.

On 18 January 1965, British Railways (BR) withdrew passenger services from the line and closed Bedworth station, along with all of the other intermediate stations on the line.

=== Reopening ===
BR resumed passenger services on the line in 1987 and reopened Bedworth station in 1988. The official opening was on 10 May 1988 and normal passenger services operated from 16 May 1988. The rebuilt station was constructed on the site of the original, and was built with platforms long enough to hold a three coach train. The construction cost in 1988 was £200,000 (equivalent to £560,000 in 2025). Half of the cost was met by Warwickshire County Council and Nuneaton and Bedworth Borough Council.

Until 2004, Bedworth station had direct links to Leicester and the East Midlands. However, as part of changes to the track layout at Nuneaton station, the link to the Nuneaton to Leicester Line was removed and thereafter trains on the line ran between Coventry and Nuneaton only.

=== Upgrade ===
On 14 December 2011, the UK Government announced an £18.8 million project to upgrade the line; it included Bedworth platforms being lengthened and the service frequency being upgraded from hourly to half-hourly. The platform lengthening was completed in early 2015 and two new stations on the line, Bermuda Park and Coventry Arena, opened in January 2016.

== Services ==
Bedworth is served by hourly trains northbound to Nuneaton and southbound to Leamington Spa, via Coventry and Kenilworth. On Sundays, hourly services operate from after 10am.

Since 2023, this route has been branded as the Elephant & Bear Line.

Preceding station	National Rail	Following station
Coventry Arena	West Midlands Railway Leamington–Coventry–Nuneaton	Bermuda Park
	Historical railways	
Hawkesbury Lane; Line open, station closed	London and North Western Railway; Coventry–Nuneaton line	Chilvers Coton; Line open, station closed
