= Chilvers Coton =

Area of Nuneaton, Warwickshire, England

Coordinates: 52.514374°N 1.467562°W

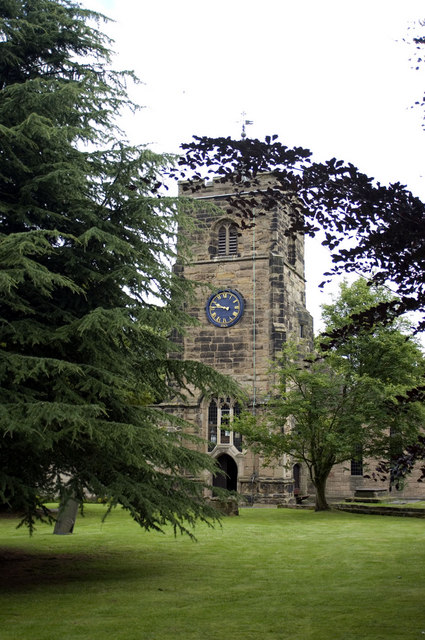
- Chilvers Coton parish church of All Saints

- Location within Warwickshire
- District: Nuneaton and Bedworth
- Shire county: Warwickshire
- Region: West Midlands
- Country: England
- Sovereign state: United Kingdom
- Post town: NUNEATON
- Postcode district: CV11
- Dialling code: 024

Chilvers Coton is an area of the town of Nuneaton in Warwickshire, England, around one mile south of the town centre.

Chilvers Coton was historically a village and civil parish in its own right and was mentioned in the Domesday Book of 1086 as “Celverdestoche,”. The author Mary Ann Evans (better known as George Eliot) lived at Griff House in the parish between 1820 and 1841. Chilvers Coton was the inspiration for the fictional village of Shepperton in Eliot's novel Scenes of Clerical Life. Like neighbouring Nuneaton, Chilvers Coton historically was a centre for the weaving and coal mining industries.

The parish of Chilvers Coton was made a local board district in 1850, being the area's first modern form of local government; prior to that it was governed by its vestry. The two local boards for Chilvers Coton and neighbouring Nuneaton were merged in 1893. The following year, all such districts were converted into urban districts. The Nuneaton and Chilvers Coton Urban District was elevated to become a municipal borough in 1907 under the single name of Nuneaton. The civil parish of Chilvers Coton continued to exist until 1920, but as an urban parish it had no parish council. The parish was abolished in 1920 when the parish of Nuneaton was enlarged to match the borough. In 1911 the parish had a population of 10,492.

The original Church of England parish church for the area is All Saints' Church. This church dated from the 13th century with 19th-century additions. Most of the church, except the tower, was destroyed in the Second World War during a German air raid on Nuneaton, and was subsequently rebuilt during 1946-51 by German prisoners of war. A Roman Catholic church, Our Lady of the Angels is also located in the area, as well as a Methodist chapel.

Between 1850 and 1965, Chilvers Coton was served by its own railway station on the Coventry to Nuneaton Line. The Coventry Canal also runs through the area.
