= Stockingford railway station =

Former railway station in England

Coordinates: 52.5232194°N 1.509036°W

Stockingford

General information
- Location: Stockingford, Nuneaton; England
- Platforms: 2

Other information
- Status: Disused

History
- Original company: Midland Railway
- Pre-grouping: Midland Railway
- Post-grouping: London Midland and Scottish Railway

Key dates
- 1 December 1864: Opened
- 4 March 1968: Closed
Location

Stockingford (/ˌstɒkɪŋˈfɔːrd/, STOK-ing-FORD) was a railway station serving the Stockingford area of Nuneaton in Warwickshire, England. It was opened by the Midland Railway on the Birmingham-Nuneaton-Leicester Line in 1864, and operated until closure in 1968.

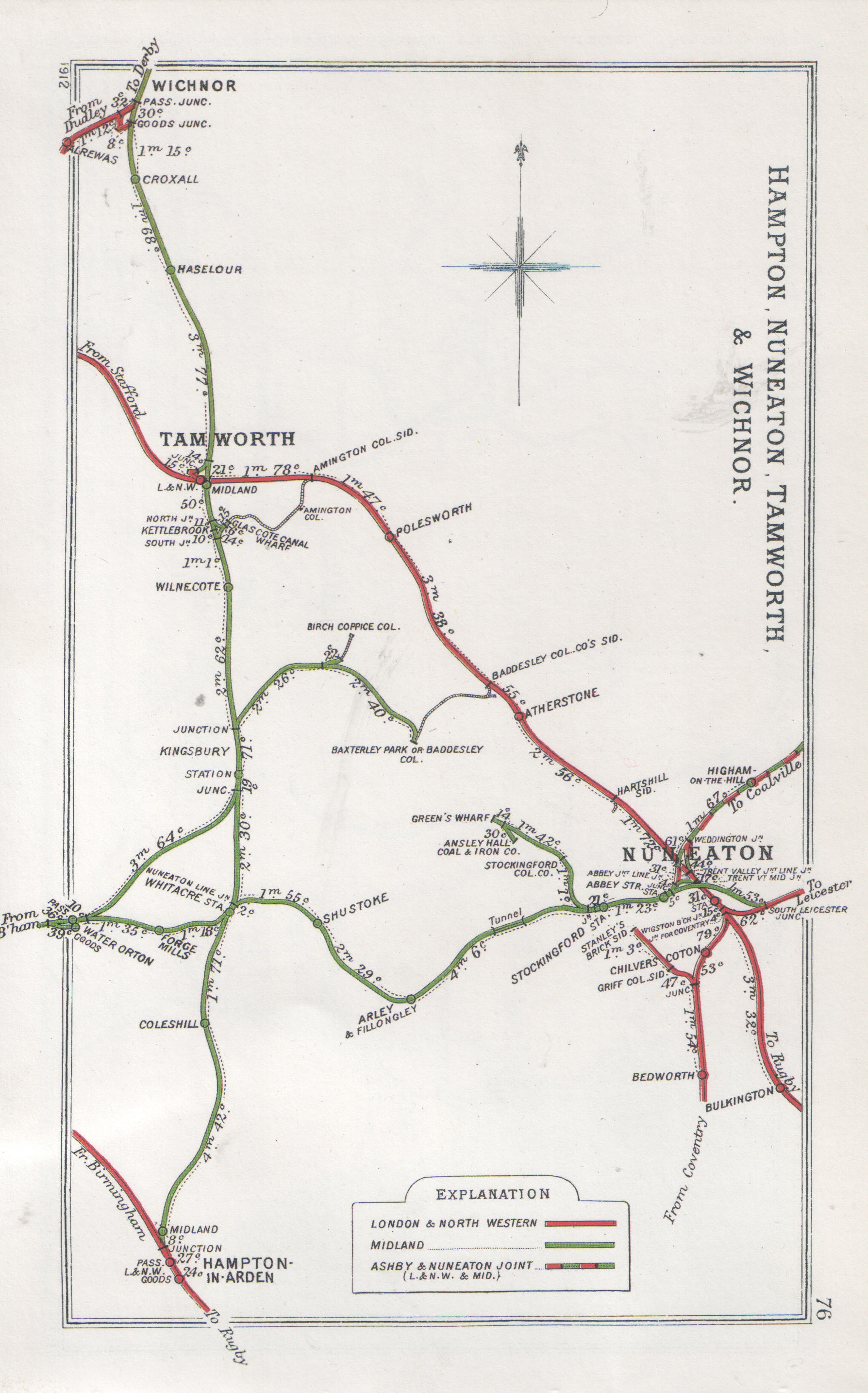
1912 map showing the railways around Nuneaton, and the location of the station.

The station came under the ownership of the London, Midland and Scottish Railway (LMS) in 1923, and then British Railways. It was closed on 4 March 1968. The line however remains open.

== Stockingford branch line ==
Between 1876 and 1959, Stockingford station was the starting point of a freight only branch line which served several local collieries. The branch was opened on 3 April 1876, and served Ansley Hall Colliery, Stockingford Colliery and Nuneaton (New) Colliery. The branch line enhanced the station's importance as a railway centre. It operated until 30 October 1959 when the last colliery it served Ansley Hall Colliery closed.

== Reopening plans ==
In January 2017, proposals for a new station at Stockingford to serve the local area were unveiled by Warwickshire County Council. The station would not open until 2023 and could be served by a CrossCountry service to Birmingham once an hour initially. The station would be located less than one mile away from the former station which was on Whittleford Road and the new station would be on Kingswood Road.

In 2020 Warwickshire County Council applied to the UK government's Restoring Your Railway fund for money to build the station, but in March 2022 it was reported the application had been rejected.

Preceding station	Historical railways	Following station
Arley and Fillongley; Line open, station closed	London, Midland and Scottish Railway; Birmingham to Leicester Line	Nuneaton Abbey Street; Line open, station closed
