= Coventry railway station =

Railway station in the West Midlands, England

Coventry
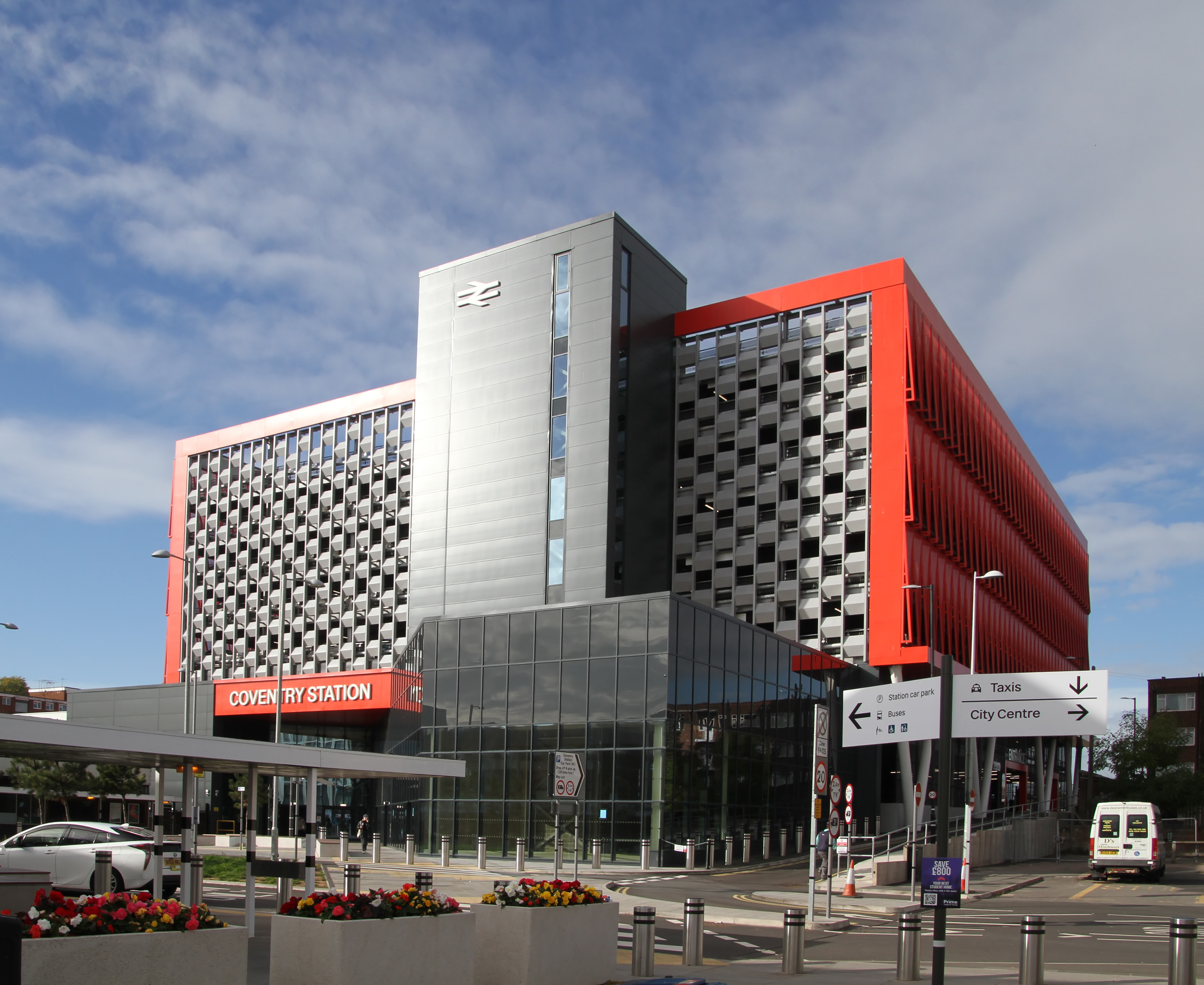
- The new station building, opened 2022.

General information
- Location: Coventry, City of Coventry, England
- Coordinates: 52.4010°N 1.5136°W
- Grid reference: SP33057822
- Manager: Avanti West Coast
- Transit authority: Transport for West Midlands
- Platforms: 4

Other information
- Station code: COV
- Fare zone: 5
- Classification: DfT category B

History
- Original company: London and Birmingham Railway
- Pre-grouping: London and North Western Railway
- Post-grouping: London, Midland and Scottish Railway

Key dates
- 1838: Opened
- 1962: Rebuilt

Passengers
- 2021/22: ▲4.636 million
- Interchange: ▲0.471 million
- 2022/23: ▲5.977 million
- Interchange: ▼0.345 million
- 2023/24: ▲6.471 million
- Interchange: ▲0.402 million
- 2024/25: ▲6.827 million
- Interchange: ▲0.506 million
- 2025/26: ▲7.205 million
- Interchange: ▲0.630 million

Listed Building – Grade II
- Feature: Coventry Station, including attached platform structures
- Designated: 24 November 1995
- Reference no.: 1242849
Location
Notes
- Passenger statistics from the Office of Rail and Road

Coventry railway station serves the city of Coventry, in the West Midlands, England. It lies on the Birmingham loop of the West Coast Main Line (WCML); it is also located at the centre of a junction where the lines to Nuneaton and to Leamington converge. It is situated on the southern edge of the city-centre, just outside the Coventry ring road, about 250 yards to the south of junction 6.

The station has the PlusBus scheme, where train and bus tickets can be bought together at a saving.

== History ==
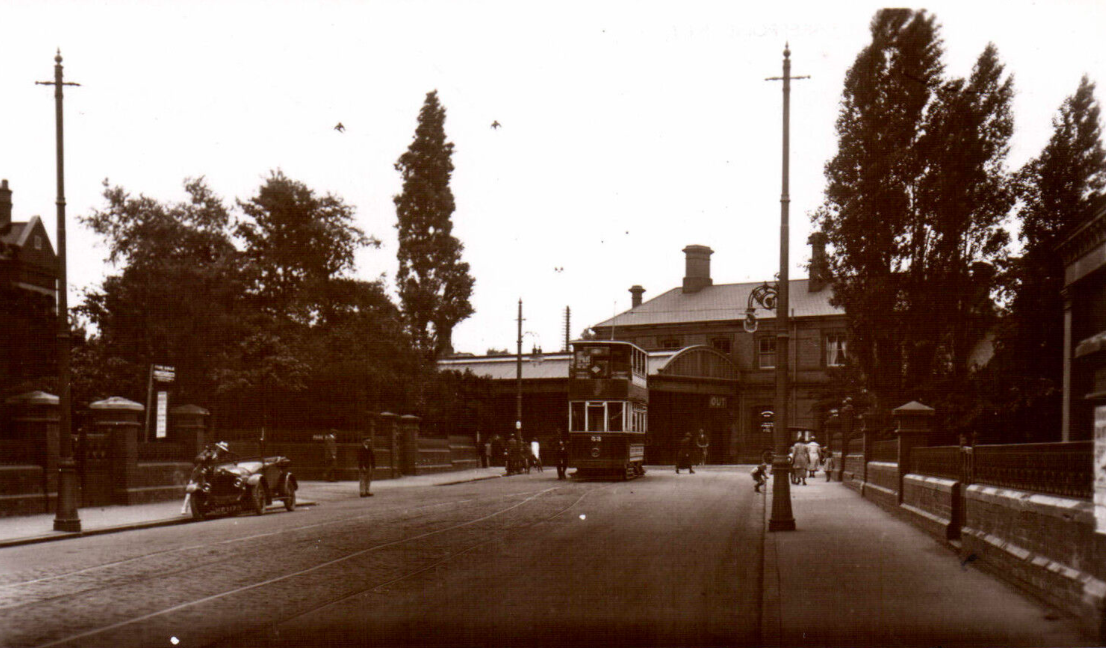
A Coventry Corporation Tramways vehicle on Eaton Road outside the station, c. 1925

The original station was built in 1838, as part of the London and Birmingham Railway, and could be entered from Warwick Road where two flights of stairs took the passengers down to the platform. Within two years, it had been replaced with a new larger station, a few hundred feet nearer to Rugby, this time, accessed via Eaton Road. In the late 19th century, the Coventry tram network extended to the station at Eaton Road. The original station building remained in service as the station masters offices, until the station was redeveloped in the early 1960s by the London Midland Region of British Railways.

The 1840 station was subject to a significant number of modifications and extensions over the years. There was an engine shed, water column and turntable; in its later days, an inclined walkway from the platform directly to Warwick Road for summer excursion passengers, and a parcel depot formed from old carriages. However, the station was constrained by bridges at either end, Stoney Road bridge to the south and Warwick Road bridge to the north. The bridges effectively restricted the station to two lines and prevented the platforms from being extended.

In 1881, the London and North Western company planned extensive alterations and improvements at an estimated cost of £12,000 to £13,000 to remedy the situation. The up and down platforms were extended beyond the bridge and a new siding installed near Quinton Road. A new line of 2¾ miles was laid from Coventry to Wainbody Wood to ease congestion and delays on this branch line. The cutting opposite the signal box on the Leamington Line was widened and the stone bridge in Stoney Lane replaced with an iron girder one. An accident occurred during the installation of the iron girder bridge when as the iron girder was being lifted into position. The hook of the pulley holding the girder broke in two and the girder fell, smashing the wagons beneath. There were no injuries, although many workmen had a lucky escape.

In 1902, the LNWR carried out further improvements at the station at a cost of £25,000. The contractor was Mr Parnell of Rugby and the work was supervised by Mr Brunsdon. The plan involved converting a garden rented by the station-master to utilise as a siding. The left-hand side of the Warwick Road bridge was widened by around 12 feet (3.7 m). The up platform was raised by 9 inches and extended 95 yards beyond the Stoney Road bridge. The interior of the station was extended to where the current entrance was; the refreshment rooms, telegraph and other offices were built on the space formerly roof-in as a cab stand. The cab stand was planned to move further in the direction of Eaton Road. A foot bridge with lifts was provided between the up and down platforms The new booking office opened in February 1903. It was 25ft 9in by 27ft and in the centre of a new block of waiting rooms and offices.

However, it proved inadequate for the growing business at the station. Work on expansion was due to start in 1914, but was delayed by labour shortages and the outbreak of the First World War. Work started in August 1915 on enlarging the booking hall. The new booking hall had a 60ft open frontage to the street with six booking windows, and extra entrances and exits to the up platform. The booking office was also much larger. The contractor was Mr. Heap of Northampton.

By 1935, the station needed additional facilities and a plan was prepared to provide a new island platform of 920 ft in length on the down Birmingham side at a cost of £70,000 to £80,000. Although the railway company had wanted a larger scheme of improvement, the full plan could not be delivered at this time, so the island platform was the first stage. Work did not start until early 1938 when the costs had risen to £100,000 (equivalent to £5,820,000 in 2025). The bookstall on the up platform was moved, rebuilt and equipped with electric light. A new electric lift was provided for the movement of luggage. The existing general and women's waiting rooms, and the enquiry office were converted into new refreshment rooms. The construction of the island platform did not start until 1939, but was put on hold by the outbreak of the Second World War and never completed to the original LMS plans.

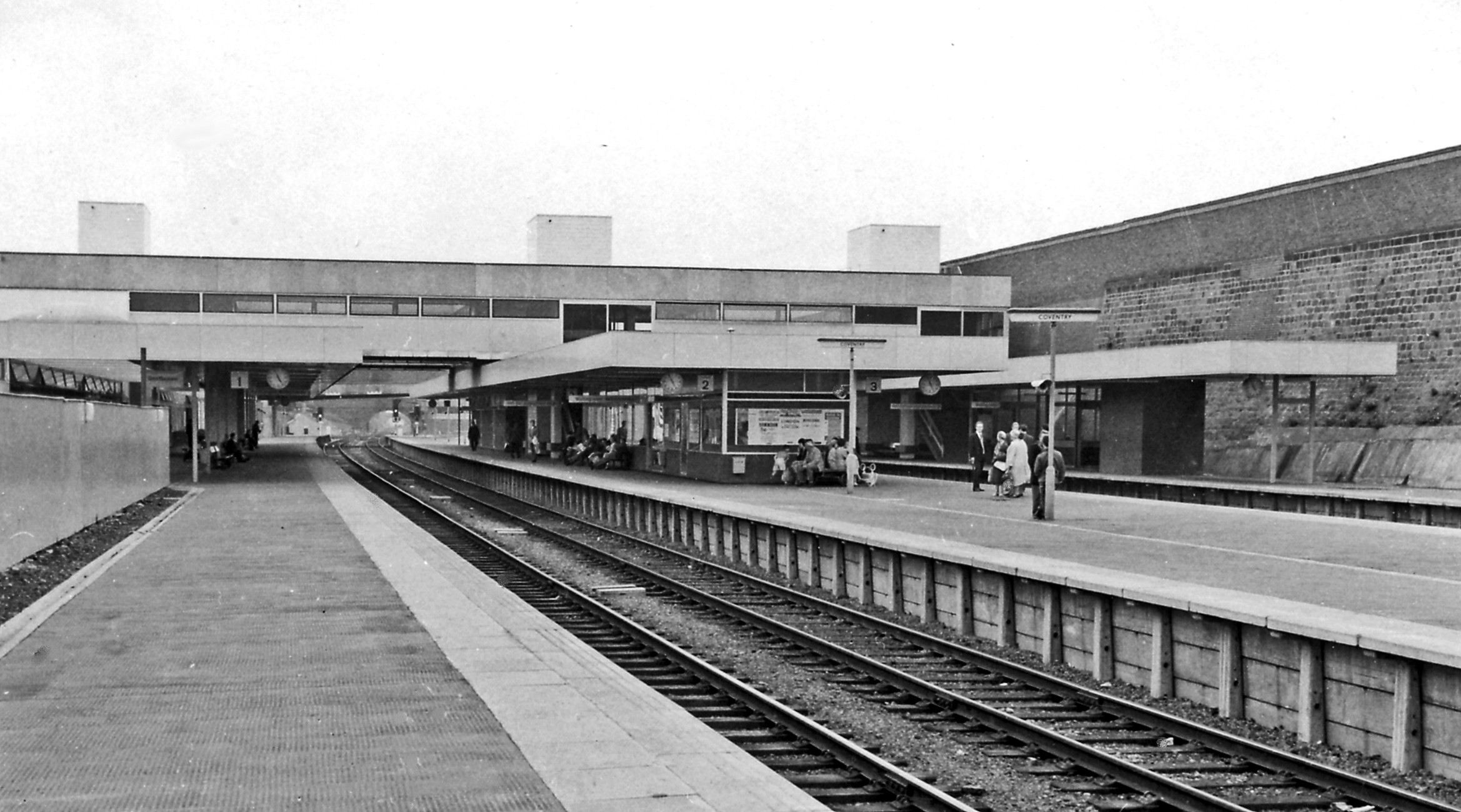
Coventry station in 1962, shortly after being rebuilt

In the early 1960s, during electrification of the line, both bridges were widened, and the old station finally demolished and re-built, this time with room for four platforms instead of two. At the time, it was demolished in 1960; some parts of the old station were 120 years old. The new station comprises a two-storey height booking hall with reinforced concrete frame, linked across an adjoining platform by a bridge to an island platform and a single sided platform. It was built to the designs of W R Headley, Regional Architect of the London Midland Region of British Railways and Derrick Shorten, the project architect. It was formally reopened on 1 May 1962. In 1995, it became a Grade II listed building.

The new station featured a new parcel depot, used to manage the large number of mail order catalogue packages coming into Coventry at the time. The depot was serviced by its own platforms from the Rugby end. The depot has now been replaced by a multi-storey car park, although some of the platforms and an electrification gantry remain.

A £91 million redevelopment of the station commenced in 2019 and was completed in 2022. The redevelopment consists of a new concourse, footbridge and a new multi-story car park. From the mid-2020s Coventry station is also planned to be served by the Coventry Very Light Rail system.

There was a power signal box on the Rugby side of the station, but was closed by Network Rail in 2002–2004 as a new signalling centre was made.

The station won the Large Station of the Year award at the National Rail Awards in 2026.

=== Motive power depot ===
The London and Birmingham Railway opened a small motive power depot at the west end of the station in 1838. This was replaced in 1866 by a larger depot in the fork between the Leamington and Rugby lines. This was enlarged in 1897 and rebuilt in 1957, but was closed 17 November 1958 and was demolished. Locomotives were then serviced at the former Great Western Railway depot at Leamington Spa.

== Facilities ==
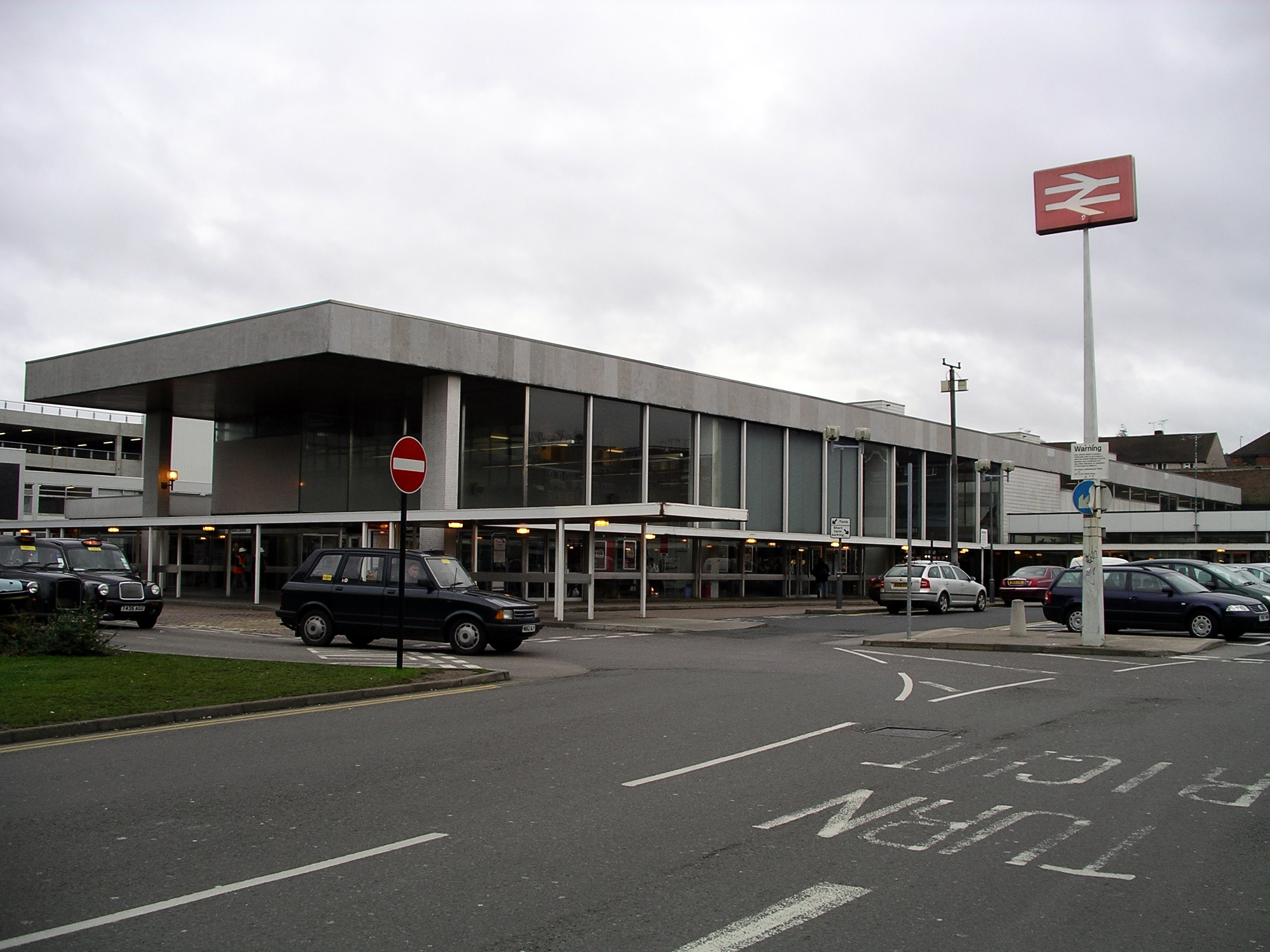
The former 1960s main station building, 2006

In addition to the usual ticket office, the station has a travel centre for information, tickets for advance travel, ferry services and rail passes. Buses to the city centre can be caught from the station car park.

== Services ==
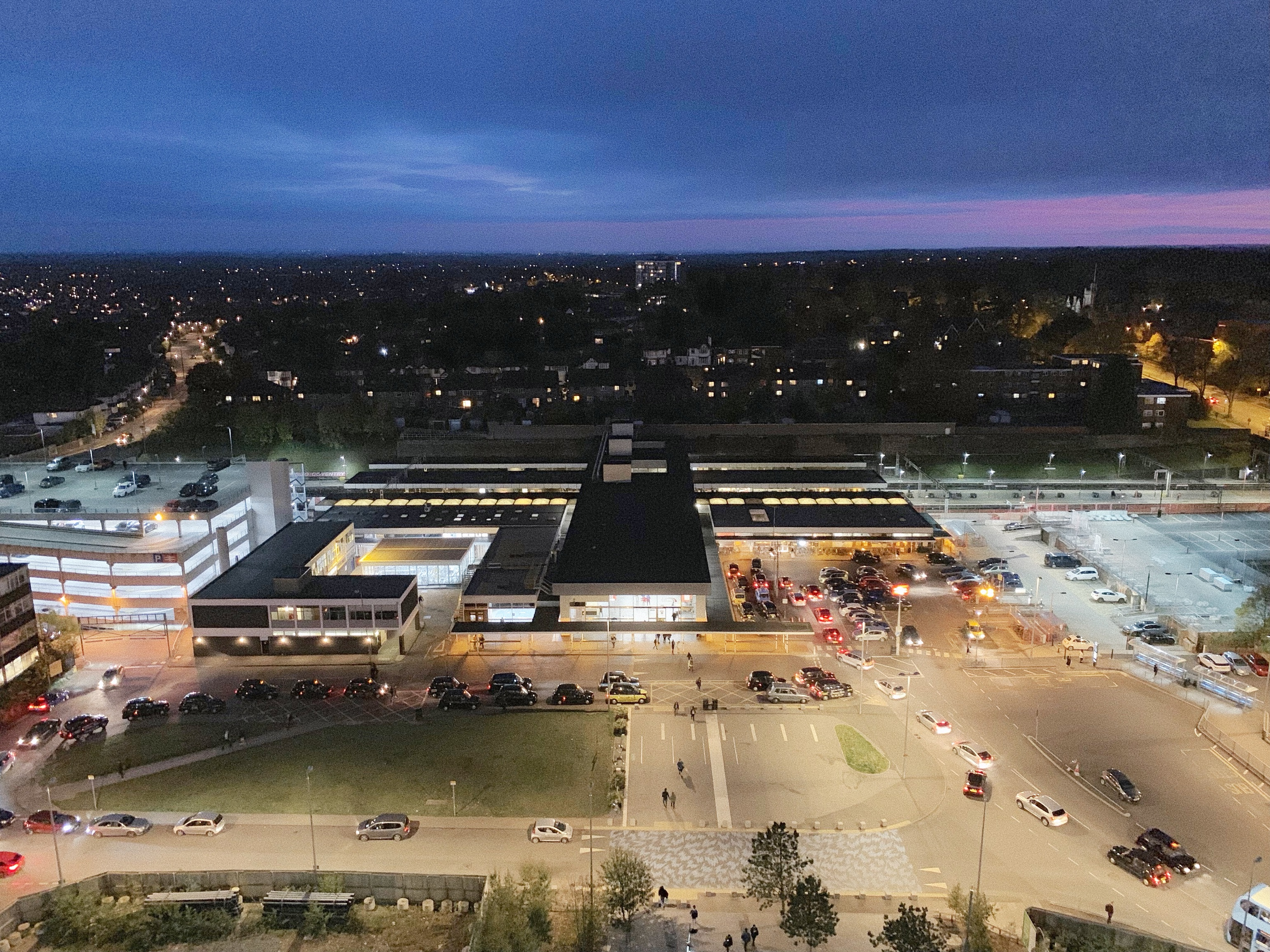
Coventry station from above, 2018

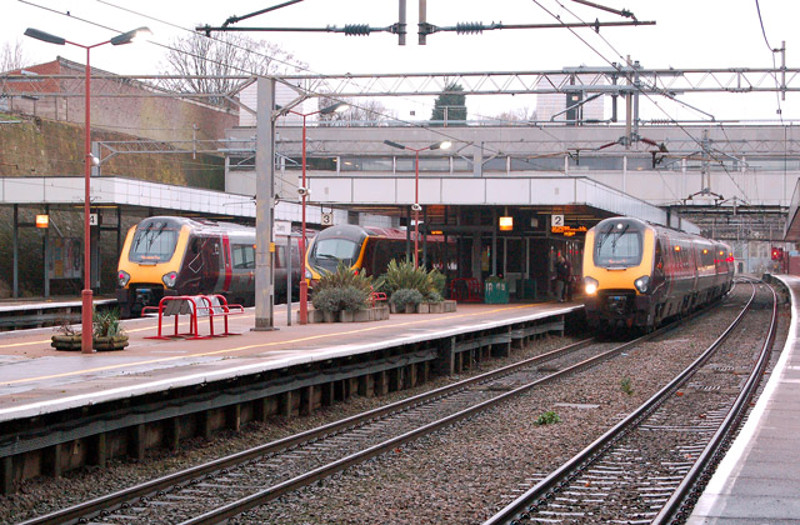
Coventry station platforms

The station is served by three train operating companies; the basic Monday to Saturday off-peak service in trains per hour is as follows:

Avanti West Coast:

- 2tph southbound to London Euston
- 2tph northbound to Birmingham New Street
  - 1tph of which extends northbound to Edinburgh Waverley or Glasgow Central (alternating each hour) via Preston and Carlisle

CrossCountry:

- 1tph to Bournemouth, via Leamington Spa and Reading
- 1tph to Manchester Piccadilly, via Birmingham New Street and Stoke-on-Trent.

West Midlands Trains:

London Northwestern Railway

- 2tph to London Euston, via Northampton
- 2tph to Birmingham New Street.

West Midlands Railway

- 1tph to Nuneaton, via Bedworth
- 1tph to Leamington Spa, via Kenilworth.

Preceding station	National Rail	Following station
Leamington Spa	CrossCountry South West and South Coast to Manchester	Birmingham International
Rugby towards London Euston	London Northwestern Railway; London–Birmingham	Canley towards Birmingham New Street
Kenilworth	West Midlands Railway; Nuneaton – Coventry – Leamington Spa	Coventry Arena
Rugby	Avanti West Coast West Coast Main Line	Birmingham International
Rugby	Avanti West Coast; London – Birmingham – North West/Scotland	Birmingham International
Milton Keynes Central	Avanti West Coast; London – Birmingham – North West/Scotland	Birmingham International
Watford Junction	Avanti West Coast; London – Birmingham – North West/Scotland	Birmingham International
London Euston	Avanti West Coast; London – Birmingham – North West/Scotland	Birmingham International
	Historical railways	
Brandon and Wolston; Line open, station closed	London and North Western Railway; Rugby–Birmingham–Stafford line	Canley; Line and station open

== Proposed light rail interchange ==
It is proposed that the station will be served by the currently under construction Coventry Very Light Rail (CVLR) system, with the first new line connecting it to the city-centre, and then out to University Hospital Coventry. Another proposed route would link it to the University of Warwick.
