= Higham on the Hill railway station =

Former railway station in Leicestershire, England

Higham on the Hill

General information
- Location: Higham on the Hill, Hinckley and Bosworth; England
- Coordinates: 52.5587°N 1.4438°W
- Platforms: 2

Other information
- Status: Disused

History
- Original company: Ashby and Nuneaton Joint Railway
- Pre-grouping: Ashby and Nuneaton Joint Railway
- Post-grouping: London Midland and Scottish Railway

Key dates
- 18 August 1873: Opened to goods
- 1 September 1873: Opened to passengers
- 13 April 1931: Closed to passengers
- 6 July 1962: Line closed to traffic
Location

Higham on the Hill railway station was a railway station on the Ashby and Nuneaton Joint Railway. It served the village of Higham on the Hill. It closed in 1931 to passengers but goods continued to pass through until 1962 when the line was closed from Shenton to Nuneaton via Stoke Golding and Higham on the Hill closed. The site is now occupied by an industrial estate but the station masters house remains as a private residence.

Preceding station	Historical railways	Following station
Stoke Golding; Line and station closed	Midland Railway, London and North Western Railway; Ashby and Nuneaton Joint Railway	Nuneaton Abbey Street; Line and station closed
