= List of Marylebone Cricket Club players (1827–1863) =

Cricketers who debuted for Marylebone Cricket Club (MCC), or for one of its associated teams, from the beginning of the 1827 season until the end of the 1863 season are as follows. Many of the players continued to represent the club after 1863 but they are only listed here, as it was in this period that they made their MCC debuts. Players who debuted for MCC before 1827 can be found in List of Marylebone Cricket Club players (1787–1826).

The "roundarm era" began in 1827 with the roundarm trial matches being played that season; 1863 was the last season before overarm bowling was legalised.

MCC played all its home matches through the roundarm era at its own Lord's venue in north London. Although many of the players who represented the club were members or ground staff, others were associated with county clubs or teams and appeared for MCC by invitation. MCC teams have always operated at all levels of the sport, and players who represented the club in minor cricket only are out of scope here.

The details are the player's usual name followed by the span of years in which he was active as an MCC player in important matches (the span may include years in which he played in minor matches only for MCC and/or years in which he did not represent MCC in any matches) and then his name is given as it would appear on modern match scorecards (e.g., surname preceded by all initials). In cases where the player represented significant other teams besides MCC, these are given at the end of his entry.

== A ==
- Sir Thomas Abdy, 1st Baronet, of Albyns (1834) : T. N. Abdy (MCC)
- Tom Adams (1838–1856) : T. M. Adams (Kent, Players, South)
- William Agar (1835) : W. T. Agar (CUCC)
- Montague Ainslie (1847) : M. M. Ainslie (OUCC)
- Charles W. Alcock (1862) : C. W. Alcock (MCC)
- Russell Aldridge (1855) : R. Aldridge (MCC)
- Caledon Alexander (1849) : C. D. Alexander
- Henry Anderson (1830–1842) : H. Anderson (MCC)
- Robert Anderson (1837–1841) : R. M. Anderson (MCC)
- Thomas Anson (1839–1845) : T. A. Anson (Cambridge Town Club, CUCC, Gentlemen)
- Anthony Henry Ashley-Cooper (1830–1833) : A. H. Ashley-Cooper (MCC)
- John Athawes (1860) : J. T. Athawes ()
- George Attfield (1845) : G. C. Attfield (MCC)
- Edward Austen (1844) : E. T. Austen (MCC)
- Cholmeley Austen-Leigh (1862) : C. Austen-Leigh ()
- Charles Austen-Leigh (1862–1863) : C. E. Austen-Leigh ()
- Spencer Austen-Leigh (1858) : S. Austen-Leigh (MCC)

== B ==
- Thomas Bagge (1862) : T. E. Bagge (CUCC)
- William Bagge (1839) : W. Bagge (Norfolk)
- Alfred Baillie (1850–1857) : A. W. Baillie (MCC)
- Duncan Baillie (1850) : D. J. Baillie (MCC)
- George Baker (1862) : G. Baker (Kent, South)
- Archibald Balfour (1862) : A. Balfour (MCC)
- Edward Balfour (1853–1854) : E. Balfour (OUCC, Gentlemen)
- Thomas Balston (1851) : T. Balston (MCC)
- Edward Banbury (1846) : E. Banbury (MCC)
- George Banbury (1860) : G. Banbury
- Thomas Barker (1836–1845) : T. Barker (Nottinghamshire, North, Players)
- George Barker (1854–1857) : G. W. Barker (MCC)
- Christopher Barnes (1860) : C. H. Barnes (MCC)
- Henry Barnett (1836–1839) : H. Barnett (MCC)
- William Barnett (1837–1838) : W. Barnett (MCC)
- Barton (1832) : Barton (A to K versus L to Z)
- John Bastard (1840) : J. H. Bastard (CUCC)
- Samuel Bateson (1844) : S. S. Bateson (MCC)
- Frederick Bathurst (1859) : F. Bathurst (OUCC)
- Wynyard Battye (1859) : W. Battye (MCC)
- Robert Bayford (1858–1865) : R. A. Bayford (CUCC, Middlesex)
- Emilius Bayley (1842–1843) : J. R. L. E. Bayley (Kent)
- John Bayley (1832–1850) : J. Bayley (Players, South, Surrey)
- Lyttleton Bayley (1846–1847) : L. H. Bayley (Kent)
- Walter Bearblock (1831) : W. Bearblock (MCC)
- Aubrey Beauclerk (1837) : A. F. J. Beauclerk (MCC)
- Charles Beauclerk (1834–1845) : C. W. Beauclerk (OUCC, Gentlemen)
- Frederick Bell (1858) : F. W. Bell (CTC, North, Players)
- William Bennett (1832–1845) : W. A. B. Bennett (Kent)
- Ralph Benson (1855) : R. A. Benson (MCC)
- William Benthall (1861–1863) : W. H. Benthall (Gentlemen, Middlesex, South)
- C. Bentley (1827) : C. Bentley
- Samuel Biddulph (1863–1874) : S. Biddulph (Nottinghamshire, North)
- Thomas Bignall (1863–1864) : T. Bignall (Nottinghamshire, North, Players)
- Thomas Blake (1832–1833) : T. G. Blake (Suffolk)
- Blanchard (1859) : Blanchard (MCC)
- Nathaniel Bland (1836) : N. Bland (MCC)
- Henry Bligh (1853) : H. Bligh (Kent)
- Edward Blore (1855) : E. W. Blore (CUCC)
- Henry Boldero (1852) : H. K. Boldero (CUCC)
- William Procter Bolland (1836–1843) : W. P. Bolland (MCC)
- Bond (1835) : Bond
- William Bonsey (1839) : W. H. Bonsey (MCC)
- John Boothby (1858–1859) : J. G. Boothby (MCC)
- Thomas Bourke (1843) : T. J. D. Bourke (MCC)
- Claude Bowes-Lyon, 13th Earl of Strathmore and Kinghorne (1843–1846) : C. Bowes-Lyon (MCC)
- William Bowyer-Smijth (1845–1848) : W. Bowyer-Smijth (MCC)
- Thomas Box (1838–1846) : T. Box (Sussex, Players, South)
- Charles Brampton (1856–1861) : C. Brampton (Nottinghamshire, North, Players)
- Jem Broadbridge (1830–1833) : J. Broadbridge (Sussex, Players)
- Henry Bromley (1844) : H. Bromley (MCC)
- Francis Brooke (1836) : F. C. Brooke
- Robert Broughton (1835–1864) : R. J. P. Broughton (CUCC)
- William Brown (1837–1842) : W. Brown (Sussex)
- David Buchanan (1860) : D. Buchanan (CUCC)
- Alfred Buckley (1851–1852) : A. Buckley (MCC)
- Duncombe Buckley (1851–1852) : D. F. Buckley (MCC)
- William Buller (1833–1839) : W. C. Buller (MCC)
- James Redfoord Bulwer (1843–1845) : J. B. R. Bulwer (CUCC)
- Lord Burghley (1847–1851) : Lord Burghley (CUCC, North)
- Thomas Burgoyne junior (1835–1844) : T. Burgoyne (MCC)
- Lewis Burnand (1863–1864) : L. W. Burnand (MCC)
- James Burt (1827–1830) : J. Burt (Hampshire)
- Arthur Button (1838) : A. Z. Button (MCC)

== C ==
- William Caffyn (1850–1857) : W. Caffyn (Surrey, Players, South)
- George Caldwell (1830–1834) : G. Caldwell (MCC)
- Berney Caldwell (1832–1844) : H. B. Caldwell (MCC)
- Charles Calmady (1828) : C. B. Calmady ()
- Edmund Calverley (1849–1855) : E. Calverley (CUCC)
- Charles Calvert (1849) : C. T. Calvert (CUCC)
- Dudley Campbell (1854) : D. Campbell (CUCC)
- Hugh Campbell (1837) : H. P. H. Campbell (MCC)
- John Carpenter Garnier (1863) : J. Carpenter-Garnier ()
- George Cavendish-Bentinck (1840–1846) : G. A. F. Cavendish-Bentinck (CUCC)
- George Cayley (1854–1862) : G. A. Cayley (CUCC)
- Thomas Chamberlayne (1844) : T. Chamberlayne (Hampshire)
- C. W. Champion de Crespigny (1843) : C. W. Champion de Crespigny (MCC)
- Arthur Chapman (1860–1863) : A. G. Chapman (Sussex)
- W. Chapman (1850) : W. Chapman ()
- Thomas Charlton (1839) : T. B. Charlton ()
- Richard Charteris (1847) : R. Charteris
- George Chatterton (1851–1861) : G. Chatterton (Sheffield, North, Players)
- James Chatterton (1859–1867) : J. Chatterton (Nottinghamshire, North)
- James Chester (1849–1859) : J. Chester (Surrey, Players, South)
- Joseph William Chitty (1846–1847) : J. W. Chitty ()
- Henry Cholmondeley (1844) : H. P. Cholmondeley
- C. Clarke (1837) : C. Clarke ()
- William Clarke (1846–1853) : W. Clarke (Nottinghamshire, North, Players)
- William Clarke (1848) : W. G. Clarke ()
- H. Clarkson (1855) : H. Clarkson
- William Clayton (1861) : W. C. Clayton (Gentlemen of England)
- Reynold Clement (1863) : R. A. Clement ()
- Lord Clifton (1873–1880) : Lord Clifton (Kent)
- Stephen Clissold (1848) : S. T. Clissold ()
- Robert Dillon, 3rd Baron Clonbrock (1833) : Lord Clonbrock (Gentlemen)
- James Cobbett (1827–1841) : J. Cobbett (Sheffield, Players, North)
- Wenman Coke (1851) : W. C. W. Coke ()
- Charles Coleridge (1850) : C. E. Coleridge (Hampshire, OUCC, South)
- William Commerell (1846) : W. A. Commerell (Oxford University)
- Francis Compton (1853–1854) : F. Compton ()
- George Cooke (1852–1853) : G. F. Cooke ()
- St Vincent Cotton (1831–1835) : S. Cotton (Cambridge Town Club, Sussex, Gentlemen)
- Thomas Craven (1842–1843) : T. Craven (Gentlemen)
- Richard Crawley (1853–1854) : R. S. Crawley ()
- Arthur Crichton (1856) : A. W. Crichton ()
- Sir Frederick Currie, 2nd Baronet (1846) : F. L. Currie ()
- Herbert Mascall Curteis (1855) : H. M. Curteis (Sussex)

== D ==
- Samuel Dakin (1847–1855) : S. Dakin (Cambridge Town Club, North, Players)
- Harrison Dalton (1846) : H. Dalton ()
- Mathew Daplyn (1835) : M. Daplyn ()
- James Dark (1827–1843) : J. H. Dark (Players)
- John Davidson (1829–1835) : J. Davidson ()
- William Davidson (1832–1837) : W. Davidson ()
- Thomas Davis (1860) : T. Davis (Nottinghamshire)
- Augustus de Bourbel (1854) : A. A. de Bourbel ()
- Tommy de Grey (1862–1866) : T. de Grey (CUCC)
- Jemmy Dean (1837–1861) : J. Dean (Sussex, Players)
- William Denison (1832) : W. Denison ()
- Lambert Denne (1859) : L. H. Denne ()
- Thomas Denne (1831–1832) : T. Denne ()
- Edward Dewing (1843–1848) : E. M. Dewing (CUCC, Gentlemen)
- Alfred Diver (1848–1850) : A. J. D. Diver (Middlesex)
- John Dolignon (1832–1843) : J. W. Dolignon ()
- William Dorrinton (1844–1846) : W. Dorrinton (Hampshire, Kent, Players)
- Stephen Dowell (1860) : S. Dowell ()
- Edward Drake (1853–1873) : E. T. Drake (CUCC, South, Gentlemen)
- Alfred du Cane (1855) : A. R. du Cane (CUCC)
- Charles du Cane (1848–1855) : C. du Cane (MCC)
- George Du Pré Porcher (1848–1851) : G. D. Porcher
- Huntley Duff (1844) : H. G. G. Duff
- Frederick Dugmore (1854) : F. W. J. Dugmore
- Viscount Dupplin (1852) : Viscount Dupplin (MCC)
- John Durell Durell (1838) : J. D. Durell (OUCC)
- Thomas Dykes (1844) : T. Dykes (CUCC)

== E ==
- Charles Ormston Eaton (1849–1853) : C. O. Eaton ()
- Frederick Morton Eden (1852) : F. M. Eden (OUCC)
- Charles Ellis (1833) : C. Ellis (Gentlemen)
- Edmund Ellis (1861–1863) : E. H. Ellis
- W. Ellis (1835) : W. Ellis
- Henry Ellison (1833–1835) : H. J. Ellison (CUCC)
- Edward Elmhirst (1835–1851) : E. Elmhirst ()
- M. Erle (1849) : M. Erle

== F ==
- Frederick Fagge (1843) : J. F. Fagge ()
- Arthur Farmer (1839) : A. A. Farmer (Surrey)
- Nicholas Felix (1830) : N. Felix ()
- Harvey Fellows (1847–1869) : H. W. Fellows (Gentlemen)
- Walter Fellows (1853–1855) : W. Fellows (OUCC, Gentlemen, South)
- Barclay Field (1861) : B. Field ()
- Cecil Fiennes (1856–1858) : C. B. T. W. Fiennes (MCC)
- John Fiennes (1850–1852) : J. F. T. W. Fiennes (MCC)
- Robert Allan Fitzgerald (1858–1874) : R. A. Fitzgerald (Middlesex, North)
- Charles Fitzwilliam (1849) : C. W. W. Fitzwilliam (MCC)
- C. B. Ford (1837) : C. B. Ford ()
- Frederick Ford (1836) : F. Ford (MCC)
- George Ford (1839) : G. J. Ford (OUCC)
- J. Ford (1836) : J. Ford ()
- James Ford (1857) : J. E. Ford (Gentlemen of England)
- William Ford (1839–1849) : W. A. Ford (MCC)
- Ralph Forster (1861–1870) : R. Forster ()
- Henry Foster (1849–1850) : H. S. Foster
- William Franks (1845–1848) : W. Franks
- J. R. Freeling (1843) : J. R. Freeling (Oxford University)
- Charles Freer (1842–1846) : C. T. Freer
- John Fuller (1854–1858) : J. M. Fuller (Cambridge Town Club, CUCC, Gentlemen)

== G ==
- Roger Gadsden (1852–1853) : R. Gadsden
- Gloucester Gambier (1839) : G. Gambier (MCC)
- Alan Stewart, 10th Earl of Galloway (1858–1864) : Lord Garlies ()
- Henry Garth (1844) : H. Garth
- Richard Garth (1839–1844) : R. Garth (Hampshire, Surrey, OUCC)
- William Gayner (1851) : W. C. Gayner
- Augustus George (1844–1847) : A. K. George ()
- Billy Good (1836–1847) : B. Good (Nottinghamshire, North, Players)
- Charles Gordon (1852–1864) : C. Gordon (Middlesex)
- William Goulding (1862) : W. Goulding (Middlesex)
- George Gowan (1849) : G. M. Gowan
- Francis Grant (1851) : F. Grant
- Edward Grimston (1832–1851) : E. H. Grimston ()
- Francis Grimston (1844–1851) : F. S. Grimston (CUCC)
- James Grimston, 2nd Earl of Verulam (1830–1843) : J. W. Grimston ()
- Robert Grimston (1836–1855) : R. Grimston (Middlesex, Gentlemen, South)
- Robert Grosvenor, 2nd Baron Ebury (1861–1863) : R. W. Grosvenor ()
- James Grundy (1851–1869) : J. Grundy (Nottinghamshire, North, Players)
- Lord Guernsey (1847–1855) : Lord Guernsey (North)

== H ==
- Charles Hale (1832) : C. Hale (CUCC)
- William Hammersley (1847–1849) : W. J. Hammersley (Cambridge Town Club, Surrey)
- Henry Hand (1838) : H. G. Hand (CUCC)
- Frederick Hankey (1852–1853) : F. A. Hankey ()
- Reginald Hankey (1853–1860) : R. Hankey (OUCC, Surrey, Gentlemen)
- Hare (1830) : Hare
- Archibald Harenc (1859) : A. R. Harenc ()
- Charles Harenc (1830–1849) : C. J. Harenc (Kent, Gentlemen)
- Edward Harman (1837) : E. B. Harman (MCC)
- Edward Hartnell (1853–1862) : E. G. Hartnell (Surrey)
- Edward Hartopp (1842–1852) : E. S. E. Hartopp (CUCC, Nottinghamshire, North, Gentlemen)
- Charles Harvey (1859) : C. M. Harvey (Middlesex)
- Charles Hawkins (1840–1842) : C. Hawkins (Sussex, Players)
- John Hay (1843) : J. W. Hay
- Arthur Haygarth (1844–1861) : A. Haygarth (Middlesex, Gentlemen, South)
- Daniel Hayward senior (1841) : D. Hayward
- Thomas Hearne (1857–1876) : T. Hearne (Middlesex, North, Players, South)
- Sir Frederick Hervey-Bathurst, 3rd Baronet (1831–1855) : F. H. Hervey-Bathurst (Hampshire, Gentlemen)
- Sir Frederick Hervey-Bathurst, 4th Baronet (1852–1861) : F. T. A. Hervey-Bathurst (Hampshire)
- Henry Hildyard (1844) : H. C. T. Hildyard
- Geoffrey Hill (1861) : G. R. C. Hill
- James Hill (1857) : J. E. Hill
- Earl of Hillsborough (1837) : Earl of Hillsborough (MCC)
- Hillingston (1832) : Hillingston (A to K versus L to Z)
- William Hillyer (1836–1853) : W. R. Hillyer (Kent, South, Players)
- Arthur Hoare (1847) : A. M. Hoare (CUCC, Surrey, Gentlemen)
- Charles Hoare (1847–1854) : C. H. Hoare (Surrey, South)
- Henry Hoare (1835–1838) : H. J. Hoare
- Thomas Hoblyn (1863) : T. H. Hoblyn
- George Hodgkinson (1858) : G. L. Hodgkinson (Middlesex, OUCC, Gentlemen)
- Robert Holden (1835–1836) : R. Holden
- William Hollis (1843) : W. Hollis ()
- Charles Hope (1858–1859) : C. S. Hope
- Ferdinand Hope-Grant (1862–1863) : F. C. Hope-Grant (CUCC)
- Henry Howard (1830–1837) : H. Howard ()
- Ferdinand Huddleston (1841) : F. Huddleston ()
- Abraham Hume (1840–1842) : A. Hume (CUCC)
- Francis Hurt (1840) : F. Hurt ()

== I ==
- Townsend Ince (1849) : T. Ince

== J ==
- Herbert Jenner (1828–1834) : H. Jenner (Kent, Gentlemen)
- Henry Jenner (1839) : H. L. Jenner (CUCC)
- William Jervis (1850–1852) : W. M. Jervis ()
- George Randall Johnson (1859–1862) : G. R. Johnson (CUCC)
- Rowland Jones-Bateman (1849) : R. L. Jones-Bateman ()

== K ==
- Walter Kavanagh (1834) : W. Kavanagh (CUCC)
- Robert William Keate (1835–1849) : R. W. Keate (OUCC, Hampshire, Gentlemen)
- George Kettle (1839–1851) : G. M. Kettle (North)
- Robert Turner King (1847) : R. T. King (Cambridge Town Club, CUCC, Gentlemen, North)
- Arthur Kingscote (1858–1859) : A. F. Kingscote ()
- John Kirwan (1842) : J. H. Kirwan (CUCC)
- James Kitson (1832) : J. Kitson
- Henry Knatchbull (1829–1849) : H. E. Knatchbull (OUCC, Gentlemen)
- Brook Knight (1845) : B. J. Knight ()
- Gregory Knight (1853) : G. Knight
- Philip Knight (1854–1864) : P. H. Knight (CUCC)
- Roger Kynaston (1829–1856) : R. Kynaston (Gentlemen)

== L ==
- Gilbert Lacy (1854) : G. D. Lacy
- John Lambert (1842) : J. A. Lambert
- Thomas Lambert (1852) : T. Lambert
- George Langdon (1839) : G. L. Langdon (Sussex)
- William Lautour (1845–1847) : W. F. J. Lautour (Hampshire)
- Alexander Law (1858–1866) : A. P. Law
- Lawrence (1831) : Lawrence (MCC)
- William Leake (1858) : W. M. Leake ()
- Francis Lear (1843) : F. Lear (OUCC)
- Edward Leathes (1828–1833) : E. Leathes (Suffolk)
- John Lee (1847) : J. M. Lee (CUCC, Surrey, Gentlemen)
- R. B. Legden (1831) : R. B. Legden (A to K versus L to Z)
- Earl of Leicester (1851) : Earl of Leicester (MCC)
- Edward Chandos Leigh (1856) : E. C. Leigh ()
- John Leslie (1843) : J. Leslie (OUCC)
- George Liddell (1840–1852) : G. A. F. Liddell ()
- William Lillywhite (1830–1851) : F. W. Lillywhite (Hampshire, Sussex, Players)
- John Lillywhite (1856–1860) : J. Lillywhite (Middlesex, Sussex, Players, South)
- Henry Lindow (1849) : H. W. Lindow
- Charles Lloyd (1819–1850) : C. S. Lloyd (MCC)
- Tom Lockyer (1856) : T. Lockyer (Surrey, Players, South)
- Frederick Loftus (1830) : F. Loftus (Middlesex)
- Lord Henry Loftus (1841–1842) : H. Y. A. Loftus (OUCC)
- Samuel Lowndes (1846–1847) : S. Lowndes
- Charles Lyttelton, 8th Viscount Cobham (1863–1866) : C. G. Lyttelton (CUCC, Gentlemen)

== M ==
- Sir Archibald Macdonald, 3rd Baronet (1841) : A. K. Macdonald
- Henry Maister (1832) : H. Maister (Gentlmen of England)
- Charles Maitland (1842–1843) : C. L. B. Maitland
- John Manners-Sutton, 3rd Viscount Canterbury (1836) : J. H. T. Manners-Sutton (CUCC)
- Earl of March (1837–1838) : Earl of March (OUCC)
- Tom Marsden (1830–1837) : T. Marsden (Sheffield, North, Players)
- Alexander Marshall (1853–1857) : A. Marshall (Surrey)
- Frederic Marshall (1854–1865) : F. Marshall (South)
- Henry Marshall (1859–1863) : H. Marshall ()
- Henry Marshall (1844–1845) : H. J. Marshall
- C. D. B. Marsham (1857–1859) : C. D. B. Marsham (OUCC, Gentlemen)
- Charles Marsham (1855–1867) : C. J. B. Marsham (Gentlemen)
- Robert Marsham (1857–1859) : R. H. B. Marsham (Gentlemen)
- Will Martingell (1844–1860) : W. Martingell (Surrey, Players, South)
- William Massey (1839–1842) : W. Massey (CUCC)
- William Mather (1853) : W. A. Mather
- Henry Mayne (1844–1849) : H. B. Mayne (Kent)
- John Mayo (1850–1851) : J. P. Mayo (Middlesex)
- Joseph McCormick (1854–1866) : J. McCormick (CUCC, North)
- Edward McNiven (1851) : E. McNiven (Surrey, Gentlemen)
- Frederick Methuen, 2nd Baron Methuen (1843) : F. H. P. Methuen ()
- William Meyrick (1835–1837) : W. Meyrick (Gentlemen)
- Frederick Micklethwait (1839–1848) : F. N. Micklethwait ()
- Barrington Mills (1844–1845) : B. S. T. Mills (OUCC)
- William Mills (1842–1844) : W. Mills (CUCC)
- Douglas Moffat (1863) : D. Moffat ()
- William Moncrieff (1847) : W. Moncrieff
- Sir Thomas Moncreiffe, 7th Baronet (1841–1852) : T. Moncreiffe ()
- Spencer Montagu (1831–1840) : S. D. Montagu
- Robert Monypenny (1861–1862) : R. P. D. Monypenny (MCC)
- John Mordaunt (1863) : J. M. Mordaunt
- Charles Morse (1844–1851) : C. Morse (CUCC)
- Thomas Lloyd-Mostyn (1851–1853) : T. E. M. L. Mostyn ()
- Pierrepont Mundy (1842) : P. H. Mundy (Gentlemen, Manchester, North)
- Herbert Murray (1853) : H. H. Murray
- Muson (1831) : Muson (MCC)
- George Muttlebury (1860) : G. A. Muttlebury
- Alfred Mynn (1833–1847) : A. Mynn (Kent, Gentlemen, South)
- Walter Mynn (1836) : W. P. Mynn (Kent, Gentlemen)

== N ==
- James Naper (1846) : J. L. Naper
- Charles Napier (1838) : C. W. A. Napier (OUCC)
- Henry Nethercote (1843–1854) : H. O. Nethercote (North)
- Henry Neville (1844) : H. A. Neville
- William Newman (1857) : W. Newman
- Ralph Nicholson (1842) : R. C. Nicholson (Gentlemen)
- Richard Nicholson (1841) : R. P. Nicholson (Gentlemen)
- William Nicholson (1846–1869) : W. Nicholson (Middlesex, Gentlemen, South)
- Thomas Nixon (1851–1859) : T. Nixon (Nottinghamshire, North, Players)
- Thomas Nixon (1862) : T. H. Nixon
- Charles Norman (1852) : C. L. Norman (CUCC)
- Henry Norman (1834) : H. Norman (Kent)
- M. Norton (1837) : M. Norton ()

== O ==
- Sir Charles Oakeley, 4th Baronet (1857) : C. W. A. Oakeley (OUCC)
- Frederick Oliver (1855) : F. W. Oliver (Surrey)
- A. Onslow (1835)
- Denzil Onslow (1860–1873) : D. R. Onslow (CUCC, Sussex)

== P ==
- James Pagden (1830) : J. W. Pagden ()
- John Paine (1855) : J. G. Paine ()
- William Parnell (1859–1870) : W. H. Parnell (I Zingari)
- Charles Parnther (1833–1835) : C. H. Parnther (CUCC, Gentlemen)
- George Parr (1863) : G. Parr (Nottinghamshire, North, Players)
- William Paterson (1835–1840) : W. S. Paterson
- Alfred Payne (1857–1858) : A. Payne (Gentlemen, North)
- Arthur Payne (1857) : A. F. Payne ()
- Sir Robert Peel, 3rd Baronet (1843) : R. Peel ()
- Oliver Pell (1847–1848) : O. C. Pell (Cambridge Town Club, CUCC, Gentlemen)
- John Pepys (1861–1867) : J. A. Pepys (Kent, OUCC, South)
- Henry Perkins (1857–1868) : H. Perkins (Cambridge Town Club)
- John Perkins (1863–1868) : J. Perkins (Cambridge Town Club)
- John Scourfield (1829–1852) : J. H. Philipps ()
- George Philips (1858) : G. H. Philips
- Edward Pickering (1828–1848) : E. H. Pickering (CUCC)
- William Pickering (1841–1843) : W. P. Pickering (Cambridge Town Club, CUCC, Gentlemen)
- George Pickering (1843) : G. S. Pickering
- Frederick Pigou (1836) : F. J. Pigou (Gentlemen)
- Fuller Pilch (1831–1845) : F. Pilch (Kent, Norfolk, North, Players)
- Henry Plowden (1863–1866) : H. M. Plowden (CUCC)
- Charles Plumer (1860) : C. G. Plumer ()
- James Pollitt (1851) : J. P. Pollitt (Middlesex)
- Frederick Ponsonby, 6th Earl of Bessborough (1834–1859) : F. G. B. Ponsonby (CUCC, Surrey, Gentlemen)
- John Ponsonby, 5th Earl of Bessborough (1830–1836) : J. G. B. Ponsonby (MCC)
- Spencer Ponsonby-Fane (1841–1862) : S. C. B. Ponsonby (Surrey, Gentlemen)
- Edward Prest (1855–1859) : E. B. Prest ()
- Price (1840–1842) : Captain Price (Sussex)
- G. Proctor (1841) : G. Proctor ()

== R ==
- John Randolph (1846–1864) : J. Randolph ()
- Abram Rawlinson (1849–1853) : A. L. Rawlinson
- Henry Raymond-Barker (1844–1847) : H. B. Raymond-Barker (CUCC)
- Richard Reade (1860) : R. B. Reade
- A. Ready (1843) : A. Ready ()
- Thomas Reay (1853–1855) : T. O. Reay
- Sam Redgate (1835–1838) : S. Redgate (Nottinghamshire, North, Players)
- Hayter Reed (1831–1833) : H. T. Reed ()
- Edmund Reeves (1851) : E. Reeves (Middlesex, Surrey)
- J. Richardson (1840–1843) : J. Richardson (Hampshire)
- Charles Ridding (1852) : C. H. Ridding ()
- William Ridding (1849–1851) : W. Ridding (OUCC, Gentlemen)
- Caleb Robinson (1861–1862) : C. Robinson
- Charles Rogers (1861) : C. Rogers (Manchester)
- Charles Romilly (1828–1833) : C. Romilly (Gentlemen)
- Edward Romilly (1827–1830) : E. Romilly (CUCC, Gentlemen)
- Frederick Romilly (1836) : F. Romilly ()
- Joseph Rowbotham (1856) : J. Rowbotham ()
- Henry Royston (1843–1861) : H. Royston (Middlesex, South)
- Lord Charles Russell (1833–1851) : Lord C. J. F. Russell ()
- Henry Stuart Russell (1839) : H. S. Russell (OUCC)

== S ==
- Thomas Sanders (1839) : T. Sanders ()
- James Saunders (1828–1831) : J. Saunders (Surrey, Players)
- Arthur Savile (1840–1841) : A. Savile (CUCC)
- Edward Sayres (1838–1842) : E. Sayres (Cambridge Town Club, CUCC, Gentlemen)
- John Sayres (1841) : J. Sayres
- George Vane-Tempest, 5th Marquess of Londonderry (1840–1846) : Viscount Seaham ()
- William Searle (1829) : W. Searle (Kent, Surrey)
- John Seton Karr (1837–1838) : J. Seton Karr (OUCC)
- Tom Sewell (1836–1851) : T. Sewell senior (Surrey, Players)
- Sir Michael Shaw Stewart, 7th Baronet (1850) : M. R. Shaw-Stewart ()
- John Sheppard (1845) : J. G. Sheppard
- Tom Sherman (1850) : T. Sherman (Surrey, South)
- Edward Sivewright (1828) : E. Sivewright (Kent, Surrey, CUCC)
- Archibald Levin Smith (1861–1864) : A. L. Smith ()
- H. Smith (1832) : H. Smith
- R. B. Smith (1843) : R. B. Smith (Hampshire)
- Stephen Smith (1852) : S. Smith ()
- Villiers Smith (1849) : V. S. C. Smith ()
- Raymond Smythies (1854) : R. B. Smythies ()
- Henry Snow (1834–1839) : H. J. Snow (CUCC, Surrey)
- Stephen Soames (1850–1853) : S. Soames (OUCC)
- Francis Stacey (1855–1863) : F. E. Stacey ()
- George Grey, 7th Earl of Stamford (1851–1858) : Earl of Stamford ()
- Ned Stephenson (1857–1858) : E. Stephenson (Sheffield, North)
- Arthur Stone (1849) : A. Stone
- William Strahan (1832–1849) : W. Strahan (Surrey, Gentlemen)
- John Strange (1836–1839) : J. Strange (Gentlemen)
- Thomas Lyon-Bowes, 12th Earl of Strathmore and Kinghorne (1844–1857) : Lord Strathmore ()
- Henry Strutt, 2nd Baron Belper (1863–1865) : H. Strutt ()
- A. Stuart (1838–1839) : A. Stuart ()
- H. Stubbs (1830) : H. Stubbs
- James Sutton (1859) : J. Sutton
- Richard Sutton (1850–1851) : R. Sutton ()
- Edward Swann (1846) : E. G. Swann ()
- William Sykes (1848) : W. Sykes ()

== T ==
- James Tabor (1863) : J. A. C. Tabor
- Walter Talbot (1851) : W. C. Talbot
- Charles Taylor (1836–1846) : C. G. Taylor (Cambridge Town Club, CUCC, Sussex, Gentlemen)
- S. Taylor (1848–1863) : S. Taylor ()
- Thomas Taylor (1850–1851) : T. C. Taylor (Middlesex)
- Frederick Thackeray (1839–1842) : F. Thackeray (Cambridge Town Club, CUCC, North)
- Alfred Thesiger (1861) : A. H. Thesiger ()
- Richard Thomas (1833) : R. Thomas ()
- John Thornhill (1840–1842) : J. Thornhill (MCC)
- R. Thornhill (1835) : R. Thornhill ()
- Theodore Thring (1840) : T. Thring (MCC)
- Henry Torre (1839) : H. J. Torre (OUCC)
- Alfred Torrens (1855) : A. Torrens
- Thomas Townley (1847–1848) : T. M. Townley (CUCC)
- William Traill (1862–1866) : W. F. Traill (Kent, South)
- Edward Tredcroft (1851–1865) : E. Tredcroft ()
- Walter Trevelyan (1846–1851) : W. B. Trevelyan (MCC, Midland Counties)
- Thomas Tuck (1832–1842) : T. R. Tuck
- Edward Turnour, 5th Earl Winterton (1862–1863) : E. Turnour (Sussex)

== V ==
- Henry Veitch (1856) : H. G. J. Veitch (OUCC)
- Henry Vernon (1852–1854) : H. Vernon (CUCC, Gentlemen)
- Henry Vigne (1837–1838) : H. G. Vigne ()

== W ==
- James Walford (1860) : J. H. Walford (CUCC)
- Arthur Henry Walker (1855–1861) : A. H. Walker (Middlesex, Gentlemen)
- Frederic Walker (1853–1856) : F. Walker (Gentlemen)
- Henry Walker (1833–1842) : H. Walker ()
- Isaac Walker (1862–1884) : I. D. Walker (Middlesex, Gentlemen, South)
- John Walker (1847–1863) : J. Walker (Middlesex)
- Russell Walker (1862–1878) : R. D. Walker (Middlesex, OUCC, Gentlemen)
- V. E. Walker (1856–1870) : V. E. Walker (Middlesex, Gentlemen, South)
- Arthur Ward (1853–1854) : A. R. Ward (CUCC)
- Matthew Ward (1835–1836) : M. Ward
- Townsend Warner (1863) : G. T. Warner (Cambridge Town Club, CUCC)
- James Watney junior (1851–1852) : J. Watney (Surrey)
- Richard Wellesley (1841) : R. Wellesley
- Frederick Wells (1830) : F. Wells ()
- George Wells (1860–1861) : G. Wells (Sussex, South)
- Ned Wenman (1830–1844) : E. G. Wenman (Kent, Players, South)
- David Whigham (1856–1857) : D. D. Whigham ()
- Charles Whittaker (1841–1846) : C. G. Whittaker (Kent, Gentlemen)
- Frederick Whymper (1851) : F. H. Whymper ()
- Thomas Wickham (1851) : T. P. Wickham ()
- Philip Williams (1849) : P. Williams ()
- Tom Wills (1855–1856) : T. W. Wills (CUCC, Kent)
- Edgar Willsher (1863) : E. Willsher (Kent, Players, South)
- Sir John Eardley-Wilmot, 2nd Baronet (1840) : J. E. Wilmot ()
- Alfred Wilson (1851–1855) : A. Wilson ()
- Fuller Wilson (1851–1853) : F. M. Wilson ()
- William Wingfield (1861) : W. Wingfield ()
- Henry Wodehouse (1829–1833) : H. Wodehouse (Gentlemen)
- Charles Wombwell (1845) : C. O. Wombwell ()
- Skynner Woodruffe (1836–1837) : S. G. Woodruffe ()
- George Wootton (1862–1873) : G. Wootton (Nottinghamshire, North, Players)
- J. D. Wright (1831) : J. D. Wright (A to K versus L to Z)
- Warwick Reed Wroth (1848) : W. R. Wroth (CUCC)
- Arthur Wrottesley, 3rd Baron Wrottesley (1845) : A. Wrottesley ()
- Halifax Wyatt (1858) : M. T. H. Wyatt ()
- Charles Wynch (1859–1865) : C. G. Wynch (Sussex, Gentlemen)
- John Wynne (1850) : J. H. G. Wynne ()
- Thomas Wythe (1839–1841) : T. M. Wythe ()

== Y ==
- Young (1831) : Young (A to K versus L to Z)

== See also ==
- Lists of Marylebone Cricket Club players

== Bibliography ==
- Haygarth, Arthur (1996) [1862]. Scores & Biographies, Volume 1 (1744–1826). Kennington: Frederick Lillywhite. ISBN 978-19-00592-23-9.
- Haygarth, Arthur (1997) [1862]. Scores & Biographies, Volume 2 (1827–1840). Kennington: Frederick Lillywhite. ISBN 978-19-00592-23-9.
