= Denne =

Denne is a surname. Notable people with the surname include:

- David Denne (1799–1861), English cricketer
- Henry Denne, English clergyman and controversialist
- Lambert Denne (1831–1898), English soldier and cricketer
- Thomas Denne (1808–1876), English cricketer
- Vincent Denne, English politician, MP for Canterbury
- Wayne Denne, field hockey player
