= Frederick Wells =

Frederick Wells may refer to:

- Frederick Wells (cricketer, born 1867) (1867–1926), English cricketer
- Frederick Wells (cricketer, born 1796) (1796–1849), English cricketer
- Frederick A. Wells (1857–1926), New York assemblyman
- Frederick W. Wells (fl. 1920s), American civil rights lawyer
- Sir Frederick Wells, 1st Baronet, Lord Mayor of London
