= George Field =

George Field or Fields may refer to:

== People ==
- George Field (chemist) (1777–1854), English chemist
- George Field (actor) (1877–1925), American silent film actor
- George Field (Kent cricketer) (1834–1901), English cricketer
- George Field (Oxford University cricketer) (1871–1942), English cricketer
- George Fields (baseball) (1852–1933), American professional baseball player
- George B. Field (1929–2024), American astrophysicist
- George Wilton Field (1863–1938), American biologist
- George Fields (American football) (born 1935/36), American football player
- George Washington Fields (1854–1932), first Black graduate of Cornell Law School
- George Field (politician) (1904–2006), first executive director of Freedom House
- W. George Field (died 1850) associate of Colonel Light in South Australia

== Transportation ==
- George Field, Illinois, a World War II United States Army Air Forces training base
