= William Sykes =

William or Bill Sykes may refer to:

- Bill Sykes (born 1948), Member for Benalla in the Victorian Parliament
- Bill Sykes (priest) (1939–2015), English chaplain and author
- William Sykes (convict) (1827–1891), convict transported to Western Australia
- William Sykes (priest) (1861–1930), Anglican clergyman
- William Sykes (businessman) (1852–1910), English manufacturer of sporting goods
- William Henry Sykes (1790–1872), Indian Army officer
- William Sykes (cricketer) (1823–1915), English clergyman and cricketer
- William Robert Sykes (1840–1917), British engineer from London
- William Stanley Sykes (1894–1961), British anaesthetist and crime writer
- Charles Henry Sykes (1882–1942), known as Bill, American cartoonist

== See also ==
- Bill Sikes, a fictional character in Oliver Twist by Charles Dickens, sometimes misspelled Bill Sykes
