= Gregory Knight =

Gregory Knight may refer to:

- Greg Knight, British politician, author and musician
- Greg Knight (businessman), founder and former chief executive of Welbeck Solutions
- Gregory C. Knight, United States Army officer
- Gregory Knight (cricketer), English cricketer
