= Martingell =

Martingell is a surname. Notable people with the surname include:

- Russell Martingell, English cricketer, father of Will
- Will Martingell (1818–1897), English cricketer
