= James Tabor (disambiguation) =

James Tabor is a Biblical scholar.

James Tabor may also refer to:

- James Tabor (cricketer) (1840–1880), English barrister.
- James Tabor (Registrary) (died 1645), official of the University of Cambridge
- Jim Tabor (1916–1953), American baseball player
