= Skynner =

Skynner is both a given name and a surname. Notable people with the name include:

- Skynner Woodruffe (1814–1848), English cricketer
- Robin Skynner (1922–2000), English psychiatrist
- Thomas Skynner (1728–1789), English priest
