= Bearblock =

Bearblock is a surname. Notable people with the surname include:

- John Bearblock, 16th-century English illustrator
- Walter Bearblock (1796–1857), English cricketer
