= C. Clarke =

C. Clarke may refer to:

- C. Clarke (1837 English cricketer), English cricketer
- C. Clarke (Sheffield cricketer), English cricketer

== See also ==
- Clarke#People with the surname
