= Charles Plumer =

English cricketer

Personal information
- Full name: Charles George Plumer
- Born: c. 1837; Canons Park, Middlesex, England
- Died: 18 March 1914 (aged 76–77); Cheltenham, Gloucestershire, England
- Batting: Unknown
- Relatives: Charles Plumer (son)

Domestic team information
- Years: Team
- 1860: Marylebone Cricket Club
- 1863: Sussex

Career statistics
| Competition | First-class |
|---|---|
| Matches | 2 |
| Runs scored | 0 |
| Batting average | 0.00 |
| 100s/50s | –/– |
| Top score | 0 |
| Catches/stumpings | 2/– |
- Source: Cricinfo, 25 January 2012

Charles George Plumer (c. 1837 – 18 March 1914) was an English cricketer. Plumer's batting style is unknown. He was born at Canons Park, Middlesex, and was educated at both Harrow and Haileybury.

Plumer made his first-class debut for the Marylebone Cricket Club against Sussex in 1860 at The Dripping Pan, Lewes. He was dismissed for a duck twice in this match, firstly by Henry Stubberfield and secondly by George Wells. He later made a second first-class appearance for Sussex against the Marylebone Cricket Club at the Royal Brunswick Ground, Hove in 1863. He again failed with the bat in this match, with Plumer twice being dismissed for a duck, both times by James Grundy.

On the 1911 census Charles George Plumer is living in Cheltenham with his wife Kate Elizabeth née Marshall whom he married in 1875 at Fort St. George, Madras, India. He describes his occupation as a retired civil servant (chief magistrate) at Mysore, Madras, India. Later he became the Chief Justice of Karnataka High Court (the then Mysore High Court). His son Charles George Marshall Plumer (born in 1878, India) was an officer in the British Army and also a cricketer.

Charles George Plumer died at Cheltenham, Gloucestershire on 18 March 1914.
