= Charles Hope =

Charles Hope may refer to:

- Charles Hope, 1st Earl of Hopetoun (1681–1742), Scottish nobleman
- Charles Hope-Weir (1710–1791), politician, member of parliament (MP) for Linlithgowshire, son of the 1st Earl of Hopetoun
- Charles Hope, Lord Granton (1763–1851), Scottish politician and judge, MP for Dumfries Burghs, and for Edinburgh
- Charles Hope (lieutenant governor) (1808–1893), Scottish politician, MP for Linlithgowshire, and lieutenant governor of the Isle of Man, 1845–1860
- Charles Hope (British Army officer) (1768–1828), major general and politician, MP for Dysart Burghs, and for Haddingtonshire
- Charles Hope (American football) (born 1970), American football player
- Charles Hope, 3rd Marquess of Linlithgow (1912–1987)
- Charles Hope (art historian) (born 1945), British art historian
- Charles Hope (cricketer) (1837–1916), English cricketer and tea broker
