= Harry Nixon (cricketer) =

English cricketer (1878–1935)

Personal information
- Full name: Harry Nixon
- Born: 8 January 1878; Nottingham, Nottinghamshire, England
- Died: 14 October 1935 (aged 57); Rutherglen, Lanarkshire, Scotland
- Batting: Unknown
- Bowling: Left-arm medium
- Relatives: Thomas Nixon (father); Thomas Nixon (grandfather)

Domestic team information
- Years: Team
- 1906: Scotland

Career statistics
Competition	First-class
Matches	1
Runs scored	53
Batting average	26.50
100s/50s	–/–
Top score	41
Balls bowled	270
Wickets	5
Bowling average	39.00
5 wickets in innings	–
10 wickets in match	–
Best bowling	3/106
Catches/stumpings	1/–
- Source: Cricinfo, 6 November 2022

Harry Nixon (8 January 1878 – 14 October 1935) was an English first-class cricketer.

The son of the cricketer Thomas Nixon junior, he was born at Nottingham in January 1878. A professional cricketer, he initially played club cricket for York and was engaged by Eastbourne as their professional in 1900. Returning to York, he trialled as a colt for Yorkshire in 1902. He later moved north of the border to be engaged as the professional at West of Scotland, before playing for Perthshire. In 1906, Nixon was selected to play for the Scottish cricket team against the touring West Indians at Edinburgh in 1906. Playing as a left-arm medium pace bowler in the Scotland side, he took 5 wickets in the match for the cost of 195 runs. From the lower order, he was dismissed in Scotland's first innings for 12 runs by Charles Ollivierre, while in their second innings he was dismissed for 41 runs by Charles Morrison, having been promoted to the middle order. Nixon died in October 1935 at Rutherglen, Lanarkshire. His grandfather, Thomas Nixon senior, was also a first-class cricketer.
