= Berney Caldwell =

English cricketer

Personal information
- Full name: Henry Berney Caldwell
- Born: April 1805; Hawkhurst, Kent, England
- Died: 17 January 1873 (aged 67); Monkton Farleigh, Wiltshire, England
- Batting: Unknown
- Relatives: George Caldwell (brother)

Domestic team information
- Years: Team
- 1832: Marylebone Cricket Club

Career statistics
Competition	First-class
Matches	5
Runs scored	11
Batting average	1.22
100s/50s	–/–
Top score	8
Balls bowled	?
Wickets	1
Bowling average	?
5 wickets in innings	–
10 wickets in match	–
Best bowling	1/?
Catches/stumpings	–/–
- Source: Cricinfo, 22 April 2021

Henry Berney Caldwell JP (April 1805 – 17 January 1873) was an English first-class cricketer.

The son of Ralph Caldwell, he was born at Hawkhurst, Kent in April 1805. He was educated at King Edward VI School, Bury St Edmunds, leaving before 1817 to attend Eton College. From Eton he went up to St Mary Hall, Oxford. He later played first-class cricket in 1832, making four appearances for the Marylebone Cricket Club and one appearance for England against Sussex. His five appearances yielded him little success, with 11 runs and one wicket. Beyond first-class cricket, he was also associated with the Norfolk county teams. Caldwell served in the Norfolk Yeomanry, holding the rank of captain in 1832. He also held the offices of justice of the peace for Norfolk and Wiltshire, having moved to Wiltshire later in his life, where he was resident at Lackham House. A member of the Royal Agricultural Society of England, he judged the implements competition at the Royal Agricultural Show when it was held at Salisbury in 1857 and served on the council of the Royal Agricultural Society in 1860–61. Caldwell died in Wiltshire at Monkton Farleigh in January 1873. His brother, George, also played first-class cricket.
