= John Jones-Bateman =

English cricketer

Personal information
- Full name: John Burleton Jones-Bateman
- Born: 21 June 1825; St Pancras, London, England
- Died: 29 December 1910 (aged 85); Sheldon, Warwickshire, England
- Batting: Unknown
- Relatives: Rowland Jones-Bateman (brother)

Domestic team information
- Years: Team
- 1848: Cambridge University

Career statistics
Competition	First-class
Matches	1
Runs scored	0
Batting average	0.00
100s/50s	–/–
Top score	0
Balls bowled	–
Wickets	–
Bowling average	–
5 wickets in innings	–
10 wickets in match	–
Best bowling	–
Catches/stumpings	–/–
- Source: Cricinfo, 7 November 2013

John Burleton Jones-Bateman (21 June 1825 – 29 December 1910) was an English cricketer. Jones-Bateman's batting style is unknown.

Jones-Bateman was born at St Pancras, London. He was educated at Winchester College and later attended Gonville and Caius College, Cambridge, where he studied theology. While studying he played a single first-class cricket match for Cambridge University against Oxford University at the Magdalen Ground in 1848. In a match which won by Oxford University by 23 runs, Jones-Bateman was dismissed for ducks in both innings, being dismissed in Cambridge University's first-innings by Charles Willis, while in their second he was dismissed by Gerald Yonge. His brother Rowland Jones-Bateman played for Oxford University in this match. After his degree ended in 1848, he was ordained as a deacon and priest. In 1849 he was nominated by a private patron to the rectory of Sheldon, Warwickshire, a position he held for 61 years. He died at Sheldon on 29 December 1910.
