= Barclay Field =

English first-class cricketer and businessman (1835 – 1892)

Personal information
- Full name: Barclay Field
- Born: 1 April 1835; Clapham, Surrey, England
- Died: 7 November 1892 (aged 57); Otford, Kent, England
- Batting: Unknown
- Relatives: George Field (brother)

Domestic team information
- Years: Team
- 1861: Marylebone Cricket Club

Career statistics
Competition	First-class
Matches	1
Runs scored	17
Batting average	17.00
100s/50s	–/–
Top score	17
Catches/stumpings	–/–
- Source: Cricinfo, 14 August 2021

Barclay Field JP (1 April 1835 – 7 November 1892) was an English first-class cricketer and businessman.

The son of George Field, he was born at Clapham in April 1835. He was educated at Eton College, before going up to University College, Oxford. Field played first-class cricket for the Marylebone Cricket Club (MCC) against Cambridge University at Fenner's in 1861. Batting twice in the match, he was unbeaten without scoring in the MCC first innings, while in their second innings he was dismissed for 17 runs by Herbert Salter. By profession he was in business in London and was a justice of the peace for Kent.

Field died following a stroke and subsequent short illness in November 1892, at his lodge in Otford, Kent. His brother, George, was also a first-class cricketer.
