= Richard Lowndes (cricketer) =

English cricketer

Personal information
- Full name: Richard Lowndes
- Born: 10 October 1821; Bloomsbury, Middlesex, England
- Died: 3 October 1898 (aged 76); Sturminster Newton, Dorset, England
- Batting: Unknown
- Relatives: Samuel Lowndes (brother)

Domestic team information
- Years: Team
- 1841: Oxford University

Career statistics
Competition	First-class
Matches	2
Runs scored	30
Batting average	7.50
100s/50s	–/–
Top score	22
Catches/stumpings	–/–
- Source: Cricinfo, 29 March 2020

Richard Lowndes (10 October 1821 – 3 October 1898) was an English first-class cricketer and clergyman.

== Life ==
He was born in Bloomsbury in October 1821, to William Loftus Lowndes. The cricketer Samuel Lowndes was his brother. He was also related to the freemason Major Richard Charles Lowndes MC.

He was educated at Winchester College and Christ Church, Oxford.

He played first-class cricket for Oxford University on two occasions in 1841, playing against Cambridge University in The University Match at Lord's, and against the Marylebone Cricket Club at the same venue. He scored 30 runs in his two matches, with a high score of 22. He also played in two county matches for Shropshire below first-class in 1844 while playing at club level for Bridgnorth.

He was a double Blue, having also rowed for Oxford in the unofficial Boat Race against Cambridge at the 1843 Henley Regatta.

After graduating from Oxford, he took holy orders in the Church of England. Lowndes' first ecclesiastical post was as rector of Poole Keynes from 1854–62. He became the vicar of Sturminster Newton in 1862 and was made a canon of Salisbury Cathedral in 1874. Lowndes died at Sturminster Newton in October 1898.

== Family ==
Lowndes married Annie Harriet Kaye, who was the daughter of William Kaye of Ampney Park and his wife Mary Cecilia, who was the daughter of Sir James Gibson-Craig, 1st Baronet. Their son was the judge Sir George Rivers Lowndes, and their daughter was the stained-glass artist Mary Lowndes.
