= Walter Seton =

English cricketer

Personal information
- Full name: Walter John Seton
- Born: 29 December 1864; Calcutta, Bengal Presidency, British India
- Died: 30 October 1912 (aged 47); Fleet, Hampshire, England
- Batting: Unknown
- Relatives: John Seton Karr (uncle)

Domestic team information
- Years: Team
- 1894: Oxford University

Career statistics
| Competition | First-class |
|---|---|
| Matches | 1 |
| Runs scored | 1 |
| Batting average | 1.00 |
| 100s/50s | –/– |
| Top score | 1 |
| Catches/stumpings | –/– |
- Source: Cricinfo, 18 April 2020

Walter John Seton (29 December 1864 – 30 October 1912) was an English first-class cricketer, barrister and soldier.

The son of Walter Seton Karr, he was born at Calcutta in British India in December 1864. He was educated at Eton College, before going up to New College, Oxford. After graduating from Oxford in 1886, he was commissioned as a second lieutenant in the London Scottish Regiment in December 1887. A student of the Inner Temple, he was called to the bar in 1889. He later made a single appearance in first-class cricket for Oxford University against Essex at Leyton in 1894, despite having graduated eight years previously. Batting twice in the match, he was dismissed for a single run in the Oxford first innings by Walter Mead, before ending their second innings unbeaten without scoring.

Seton was promoted to lieutenant in February 1890, before being promoted to captain in January 1892. He resigned his commission in May 1895, but later returned to serve in South Africa in the Second Boer War, before resigning his commission for a second and final time in September 1906, at which point he retained the rank of captain. He contributed articles on cricket in public schools to the Wisden Cricketers' Almanack's of 1905 and 1906. He was the proprietor of Bramshot Golf Club in Hampshire, giving up his lease in early 1912. Seton died later that same year in October at Fleet, Hampshire. His uncle, John Seton Karr, also played first-class cricket.
