= Edward Banbury =

English cricketer (died 1871)

Personal information
- Full name: Edward Banbury
- Born: c. 1817; Warley, Essex, England
- Died: 8 April 1871 (aged 53/54); Tring Park, Hertfordshire, England

Domestic team information
- Years: Team
- 1846: Marylebone Cricket Club

Career statistics
Competition	First-class
Matches	1
Runs scored	4
Batting average	2.00
100s/50s	0/0
Top score	4
Catches/stumpings	0/–
- Source: Cricinfo, 7 November 2013

Edward Banbury (c. 1817 – 8 April 1871) was an English cricketer. He was born at Warley, Essex.

Banbury made a single appearance in first-class cricket for the Marylebone Cricket Club against the Surrey Club at The Oval in 1846. In a match which Marylebone Cricket Club won by 48 runs, Banbury scored 4 runs in their first-innings before he was dismissed by William Martingell, while in their second-innings he was dismissed for a duck by Bill Brockwell.

He died at Tring Park, Hertfordshire on 8 April 1871.
