= Harrison Dalton =

English cricketer

Personal information
- Full name: Harrison Dalton
- Born: c. 1825; Gipping, Suffolk, England
- Died: 14 July 1881 (aged 57/58); Whitchurch-on-Thames, Oxfordshire, England
- Batting: Unknown

Domestic team information
- Years: Team
- 1846: Marylebone Cricket Club

Career statistics
Competition	First-class
Matches	1
Runs scored	7
Batting average	7.00
100s/50s	–/–
Top score	6
Balls bowled	–
Wickets	–
Bowling average	–
5 wickets in innings	–
10 wickets in match	–
Best bowling	–
Catches/stumpings	–/–
- Source: Cricinfo, 29 December 2013

Harrison Dalton (c. 1825 – 14 July 1881) was an English cricketer. He was born in Gipping, Suffolk, and christened at Stowmarket on 20 July 1825.

A batsman of unknown style, Dalton made a single appearance first-class cricket for the Marylebone Cricket Club (MCC) against Oxford University in 1846 at the Magdalen Ground, Oxford. In a match which the MCC won by three wickets, Dalton ended the MCC's first-innings not out on 1 run, while in their second-innings he was dismissed for 6 runs by Gerald Yonge. Dalton batted at number eleven in the MCC first-innings, but opened the batting alongside Roger Kynaston in their second-innings.

He died at Whitchurch-on-Thames, Oxfordshire on 14 July 1881.

== External list ==
- Harrison Dalton at Cricinfo
- Harrison Dalton at CricketArchive
