= Henry Royston =

English cricketer and umpire

Personal information
- Full name: Henry Royston
- Born: 12 August 1819; Harrow on the Hill, Middlesex, England
- Died: 30 September 1873 (aged 54); St John's Wood, London, England
- Nickname: Cocky
- Height: 5 ft 6 in (1.68 m)
- Batting: Right-handed
- Bowling: Right-arm roundarm slow

Domestic team information
- Years: Team
- 1843–1861: Marylebone Cricket Club
- 1850–1862: Middlesex

Career statistics
Competition	First-class
Matches	68
Runs scored	1,065
Batting average	10.44
100s/50s	–/2
Top score	60
Balls bowled	1,796
Wickets	110
Bowling average	12.01
5 wickets in innings	6
10 wickets in match	1
Best bowling	8/44
Catches/stumpings	28/–
- Source: Cricinfo, 23 August 2019

Henry Royston (12 August 1819 – 30 September 1873) was an English first-class cricketer and cricket umpire.

Royston was born at Harrow on the Hill in August 1819. A professional all-round cricketer, he began his 25 year association with the Marylebone Cricket Club (MCC) in 1843, making his debut in first-class cricket for the club against Hampshire at Lord's. Throughout the 1840s, he played for a number of club sides and played his first-class cricket almost exclusively for the MCC, except for two appearances for an England XI in 1845 and 1847. He first played for Middlesex in 1850, debuting for the county in first-class matches against Surrey. He also made first-class appearances for several other teams, including the Players in the Gentlemen v Players match, for the South in the North v South fixture and for a United England Eleven amongst others. His four appearances for Middlesex were sporadic and spread over a period of twelve years, with his final appearance coming just two years before the formation of Middlesex County Cricket Club. It was for the MCC that he played the vast majority of his first-class matches for, making a total of 51 appearances between 1843–61. In these matches he scored 974 runs at an average of 12.02, with a high score of 60. Standing 5 foot 6 inches tall and bowling right-arm roundarm slow, he also took 91 wickets for the MCC at a bowling average of 11.28, with best figures of 8 for 44. He took five wickets in an innings on five occasions and took ten wickets in a match once. His appearances in club cricket continued into the 1850s and early 1860s, demonstrating that Royston was a sought after player, with him making guest appearances for the personal teams of many leading cricket figures of the day, including Sir Frederick Hervey-Bathurst, Robert Grimston and Roger Kynaston.

Besides playing, he was a well known umpire, standing in 133 first-class matches between 1846 and 1872. Away from cricket, Royston was by trade a confectioner. He died at St John's Wood in September 1873.
