= Stephen Soames =

English cricketer and barrister

Personal information
- Full name: Stephen Soames
- Born: 6 August 1826; Stoke Newington, Middlesex, England
- Died: 14 July 1908 (aged 81); Kensington, London, England
- Batting: Unknown
- Bowling: Unknown

Domestic team information
- Years: Team
- 1846–1850: Oxford University
- 1850–1853: Marylebone Cricket Club

Career statistics
Competition	First-class
Matches	11
Runs scored	57
Batting average	4.38
100s/50s	0/0
Top score	11*
Balls bowled	76
Wickets	28
Bowling average	?
5 wickets in innings	1
10 wickets in match	1
Best bowling	8/?
Catches/stumpings	3/–
- Source: Cricinfo, 2 August 2019

Stephen Soames JP (6 August 1826 – 14 July 1908) was an English cricketer and barrister.

The son of Charles Soames, he was born at Stoke Newington in August 1826. He was educated at Rugby School, before going up to Trinity College, Oxford. While studying at Oxford, he made his debut in first-class cricket for Oxford University against the Marylebone Cricket Club at Oxford in 1846. He played first-class cricket for Oxford until 1850, making six appearances. He made four first-class appearances for the MCC between 1850–53, as well as making one appearance for the Gentlemen of England against the Gentlemen of Kent in 1851. In eleven first-class matches, Soames took a total of 28 wickets, taking five wickets in an innings and ten wickets in a match once.

A student of Lincoln's Inn, Soames was called to the bar in November 1851. On 6 August 1863 he married Julia Constance Martin (born 1 October 1837), with the couple having four sons. He later served as a justice of the peace for Northamptonshire and Hertfordshire, as well as being commissioned to the Lieutenancy of the City of London in 1892. Soames died at Kensington in July 1908.
