= Durell Durell =

English cricketer and clergyman

Personal information
- Full name: John Durell Durell
- Born: 21 May 1812; Westminster, London, England
- Died: 1 June 1879 (aged 67); Winchester, Hampshire, England
- Batting: Unknown
- Bowling: Unknown

Domestic team information
- Years: Team
- 1838: Marylebone Cricket Club
- 1838–1840: Oxford University

Career statistics
Competition	First-class
Matches	4
Runs scored	108
Batting average	13.50
100s/50s	–/1
Top score	53
Balls bowled	?
Wickets	3
Bowling average	?
5 wickets in innings	–
10 wickets in match	–
Best bowling	2/?
Catches/stumpings	2/–
- Source: Cricinfo, 19 February 2020

John Durell Durell (21 May 1812 – 1 June 1879) was an English first-class cricketer and clergyman.

The son of Durell Durell senior, he was born at Westminster in May 1812. He was educated at Westminster School, before going up to New Inn Hall, Oxford. While studying at Oxford, he made his debut in first-class cricket for the Marylebone Cricket Club (MCC) against Oxford University in 1838 at Oxford. In the same season he played for Oxford University in The University Match against Cambridge University, with Durrell making two further first-class appearances for Oxford in 1839 and 1840, both against the MCC. He scored a total of 108 runs in his four first-class matches, with a high score of 53 for Oxford University. After graduating from Oxford, Durrell took holy orders in the Church of England. He was the perpetual curate of Marchwood from 1860 to 1878. He died at Winchester in June 1879, a year after leaving his ecclesiastical post at Marchwood.
