= William Grasett Clarke =

English cricketer and clergyman

Personal information
- Full name: William Grasett Clarke
- Born: 6 June 1821; Bridgetown, Saint Michael, Barbados
- Died: 11 February 1893 (aged 71); St Pancras, London, England
- Batting: Unknown

Domestic team information
- Years: Team
- 1840–1843: Oxford University
- 1848: Marylebone Cricket Club

Career statistics
Competition	First-class
Matches	4
Runs scored	24
Batting average	3.42
100s/50s	–/–
Top score	10*
Catches/stumpings	2/–
- Source: Cricinfo, 19 February 2020

William Grasett Clarke (6 June 1821 – 11 February 1893) was an English first-class cricketer and clergyman.

The son of Foster Clarke, he was born at Bridgetown in Barbados in June 1821. He was educated at Winchester College, before going up to Oriel College, Oxford. While studying at Oxford, he made three appearances in first-class cricket for Oxford University, playing twice in 1840 against Cambridge University in The University Match and the Marylebone Cricket Club (MCC), later following this up with a further appearance against the MCC in 1843. He made a fourth appearance in first-class cricket in 1848, playing for the MCC against Oxford University. After graduating from Oxford, Clarke took holy orders in the Church of England. He was the perpetual curate of Charlton Abbots, Gloucestershire from 1859–66. Clarke died at St Pancras in February 1893.
