= James Walford =

English cricketer

Personal information
- Full name: James Hare Walford
- Born: 28 February 1838; Dallinghoo, Suffolk, England
- Died: 16 August 1915 (aged 77); Wandsworth, London, England
- Batting: Unknown

Domestic team information
- Years: Team
- 1860: Cambridge University
- 1860: Marylebone Cricket Club

Career statistics
Competition	First-class
Matches	2
Runs scored	32
Batting average	10.66
100s/50s	–/–
Top score	25
Catches/stumpings	1/–
- Source: Cricinfo, 25 January 2023

James Hare Walford (28 February 1838 – 16 August 1915) played in two cricket matches in 1860 that have since been recognised as having been first-class: one each for the Cambridge University Cricket Club and the Marylebone Cricket Club (MCC). He was born at Dallinghoo, Suffolk and died at Wandsworth, London.

The son of the rector of Dallinghoo, Walford was educated at Harrow School and at Trinity College, Cambridge. As a cricketer, he was a middle- or lower-order batsman, though it is not known whether he batted right- or left-handed. His two first-class matches came within a fortnight of each other in May 1860. In the first, scores of 7 and 25 for the Cambridge University team against the Cambridge Town Club were enough for the university team to want to take a second look at him, and he was duly picked for the MCC team to play against the university, a frequent ploy in university cricket at the time, but then failed to score in his only innings. Although he played in minor matches for the Cambridge team across the rest of the 1860 season, he was not picked for the University Match against Oxford University and played no further first-class games.

Walford graduated from Cambridge University with a Bachelor of Arts degree in 1861. He lived in Natal in South Africa and then later in Suffolk, where he was an agent for the Conservative Party.
