= George Gowan =

English cricketer and British Army officer

Personal information
- Full name: George Mauleverer Gowan
- Born: 6 February 1818; Madras, Madras Presidency, British India
- Died: 15 July 1890 (aged 72); Marylebone, London, England
- Batting: Unknown
- Role: Wicket-keeper

Domestic team information
- Years: Team
- 1849: Marylebone Cricket Club

Career statistics
Competition	First-class
Matches	2
Runs scored	21
Batting average	5.25
100s/50s	–/–
Top score	15
Catches/stumpings	2/1
- Source: Cricinfo, 23 October 2019

George Mauleverer Gowan (6 February 1818 – 15 July 1890) was an English first-class cricketer and British Army officer.

== Personal life ==
The son of George Cowan, he was born in February 1818 at Madras in British India. He was educated in England, first at Charterhouse School from 1829–32, before attending Harrow School from June 1832–1836.

He married Anne Stratton in 1849 and lived at Leamington Spa.

Gowan died at Marylebone in July 1890.

== Career ==
=== Army career ===
He purchased a commission in the 97th Regiment of Foot as an ensign in February 1837. Gowan purchased the rank of lieutenant in May 1839, before purchasing the rank of captain in April 1845.

=== Cricket career ===
Gowan made his debut in first-class cricket for the Marylebone Cricket Club against Cambridge University at Lord's in 1849, before making a second first-class appearance seventeen years later in 1862 for the Gentlemen of the North against the Gentlemen of the South at Nottingham. Playing as a wicket-keeper, Gowan scored 21 runs in his two matches, as well as taking two catches and making a single stumping.
