= George Field (Kent cricketer) =

English cricketer

Personal information
- Full name: George Hanbury Field
- Born: 1 March 1834; Clapham, Surrey
- Died: 24 July 1901 (aged 67); Ashurst Park, Tunbridge Wells, Kent
- Batting: Right-handed
- Relatives: Barclay Field (brother)

Domestic team information
- Years: Team
- 1856–1859: Kent
- Source: Cricinfo, 3 July 2020

George Hanbury Field (1 March 1834 – 24 July 1901) was an English cricketer. He played five first-class matches between 1856 and 1859.

== Early and professional life ==
Field was born at Clapham in 1834, the son of George and Susanna Field. His father was a hop merchant who later became a Justice of the Peace (JP) and expanded Ashurst Park, a mansion near Tunbridge Wells in Kent. Field was educated at Eton College and University College, Oxford where he studied law. After graduating in 1858 he was called to the bar at Lincoln's Inn in London and worked as a barrister and served as a JP. He later became a brewery owner and bank director after inheriting Ashurst Park in 1875.

== Cricket ==
Although he did not make the Eton school team, Field was a keen amateur cricketer, occasionally playing alongside his brother Barclay. He played for Oxford University, although not in first-class matches, and later for Marylebone Cricket Club (MCC) and teams such as Harlequins, Old Etonians and Sevenoaks Vine. He played in five first-class matches, making his senior debut for a Gentlemen of Kent and Sussex combine during the 1856 Canterbury Cricket Week. Three of his four first-class matches for Kent were played on Higher Common Ground at Tunbridge Wells; he made his highest first-class score of 11 runs on the ground in his final senior appearance in 1859.

The same year Field attended the meeting which established a new Kent County Cricket Club at Maidstone, proposing the first President. He served on the management committee of the club between 1865 and 1870 and his father and brother, Barclay Field, were both members of the club.

== Family and later life ==
Field married Georgina Turnour, the daughter of Edward Turnour, 4th Earl Winterton, in 1862. The couple had two sons and three daughters. After Georgina's death in 1891 he married the 18-year old Emily Hardinge, (Note: Emily Hardinge was 41 years younger than Field at the time of their marriage in 1893. She died in 1960 aged 99.) the daughter of Charles Hardinge, 2nd Viscount Hardinge, and had two sons. (Note: The couple had at least two sons, one of whom died during the First World War. Carlaw mentions only one son.)

Field died in July 1901 at Ashurst Park. He was aged 67. A number of houses on the Ashurst Park estate were built during Field's ownership and bear his initials. His wife memorialised him through a number of endowments to the local church, St Peter's at Fordcombe where many of the Hardinge family are buried.

== Bibliography ==
- Carlaw, Derek (2020). Kent County Cricketers, A to Z: Part One (1806–1914) (PDF). Cardiff: ACS.
