= Thomas Balston (cricketer) =

English cricket player (1822–1899)

Personal information
- Full name: Thomas Balston
- Born: 30 January 1822; Maidstone, Kent, England
- Died: 23 December 1899 (aged 77); Hollingbourne, Kent, England
- Batting: Unknown

Domestic team information
- Years: Team
- 1851: Marylebone Cricket Club

Career statistics
Competition	First-class
Matches	1
Runs scored	2
Batting average	1.00
100s/50s	–/–
Top score	2
Catches/stumpings	–/–
- Source: Cricinfo, 23 June 2021

Thomas Balston (30 January 1822 – 23 December 1899) was an English first-class cricketer and barrister.

== Personal life ==
The seventh son of William Balston, he was born at Maidstone in January 1822. The Balston family had been paper-makers since the 18th century, entering business with the Whatman paper-making family. Their success in business led to social prominence and the Balstons were regarded as being amongst the gentry of their county. Balston died at his residence at Hollingbourne in December 1899, following a protracted illness.

== Education ==
He was educated at Rugby School, before going up to Brasenose College, Oxford. A student of the Inner Temple in April 1845, he was called to the bar to practice as a barrister in June 1848.

== Cricket career ==
Balston played first-class cricket for the Marylebone Cricket Club (MCC), making a single appearance against Cambridge University at Lord's in 1851. Batting twice in the match, he made a duck in the MCC first innings and scored 2 runs in their second innings, being dismissed by David Buchanan and John Weston respectively.
