= George Field (Oxford University cricketer) =

English cricketer

Personal information
- Born: 30 September 1871; Anfield, Liverpool
- Died: 9 June 1942 (aged 70); Portreath, Cornwall
- Source: Cricinfo, 10 March 2017

George Field (30 September 1871 – 9 June 1942) was an English cricketer. He was educated at Uppingham School and Oxford University.

He was a right handed batsman and often wicket keeper. He played one first-class match for Oxford University Cricket Club in 1893. After university, he played at club level for Liverpool and appeared in two county matches for Shropshire in 1902, scoring a total of 89 runs, with best match score of 42.

== See also ==
- List of Oxford University Cricket Club players
