= Samuel Lowndes =

English cricketer and stockbroker

Personal information
- Full name: Samuel Lowndes
- Born: 1825; Finsbury, Middlesex, England
- Died: 16 September 1903 (aged 77); Guildford, Surrey, England
- Batting: Unknown
- Relatives: Richard Lowndes (brother)

Domestic team information
- Years: Team
- 1846–1847: Marylebone Cricket Club

Career statistics
Competition	First-class
Matches	3
Runs scored	33
Batting average	8.25
100s/50s	–/–
Top score	23
Catches/stumpings	2/–
- Source: Cricinfo, 11 June 2021

Samuel Lowndes JP (1825 – 16 September 1903) was an English first-class cricketer and stockbroker.

The son of William Loftus Lowndes, he was born at Finsbury in 1825 and was educated at Winchester College. After completing his education at Winchester, he joined the Stock Exchange. Lowndes later played first-class cricket for the Marylebone Cricket Club, making two appearances against Oxford University in 1846 and one appearance against Cambridge University in 1847. He had little success in these matches, scoring a total of 33 runs with a highest score of 23. He appeared below first-class level in two matches for Shropshire in 1844 while playing at club level for Bridgnorth. Lowndes was a justice of the peace for Dorset. He died at Guildford in September 1903, aged 77. His brother, Richard, was also a first-class cricketer.
