= William Barnett (MCC cricketer) =

English cricketer

Personal information
- Full name: William Barnett

Domestic team information
- Years: Team
- 1837–1838: Marylebone Cricket Club

Career statistics
Competition	FC
Matches	5
Runs scored	43
Batting average	4,30
100s/50s	0/0
Top score	14
Catches/stumpings	1/–
- Source: Cricinfo, 10 April 2014

William Barnett (dates of birth and death unknown) was an English cricketer who active in first-class cricket in the 1830s. Barnett made his first-class debut for The Bs against Marylebone Cricket Club (MCC) at Lord's, before playing four first-class matches for MCC in 1837 and 1838. In his five first-class matches, Barnett scored 43 runs with a high-score of 14. Barnett's batting style is unknown.
