= Herbert Salter =

English cricketer

Herbert William Salter (5 December 1839 – 23 October 1894) was an English cricketer who played first-class cricket for Cambridge University and other amateur sides in 1861 and 1862. He was born at Carleton Forehoe in Norfolk and died at Gravesend in Kent.

Salter was educated at Clare College, Cambridge, matriculating in 1859; his schooling beforehand is not known. Salter played cricket as a lower-order batsman and a bowler: it is not known whether he was right- or left-handed. In his first first-class match for the Cambridge University side, he took five Cambridge Town Club wickets for 62 runs. In the 1861 University Match against Oxford University, he took three Oxford wickets for 19 runs in the first innings and six, again for 19 runs, in the second, to lead Cambridge to victory after the team had trailed on the first innings; the second innings figures were the best of his first-class career. He was also successful in the 1862 University Match, taking the first four Oxford wickets in the first innings to reduce the Oxford score to 9 for 4, though he took only one further wicket in the match; he also top-scored in the Cambridge first innings, making an unbeaten 32 in his accustomed position as No 11 in the batting order. After the university cricket season was over, he played only one further match, for a Gentlemen of the North side.

Salter graduated from Cambridge University in 1863 with a Bachelor of Arts degree. Although he played no further first-class cricket, he appeared in minor matches for teams in the Norfolk area, including forerunners of the Norfolk County Cricket Club. He became a wine merchant in Thetford and later acted as a private tutor.
