= Frederick Dugmore =

English cricketer and British Army officer

Personal information
- Full name: Frederick William John Dugmore
- Born: 21 July 1827; St Pancras, Middlesex, England
- Died: 5 May 1908 (aged 80); Hamble-le-Rice, Hampshire, England
- Batting: Unknown

Domestic team information
- Years: Team
- 1854: Marylebone Cricket Club

Career statistics
Competition	First-class
Matches	1
Runs scored	30
Batting average	30.00
100s/50s	–/–
Top score	17*
Catches/stumpings	–/–
- Source: Cricinfo, 14 October 2021

Frederick William John Dugmore (21 July 1827 — 5 May 1908) was an English first-class cricketer and British Army officer.

The son of William Dugmore, he was born at St Pancras in July 1827. He was privately educated in Brighton, before going up to Trinity College, Cambridge. He was a student of Lincoln's Inn, but was not called to the bar, instead deciding on a military career when he purchased the rank of lieutenant in the Cambridgeshire Militia in May 1853. He transferred to the regular army in June 1857, when he purchased the rank of ensign in the West India Regiment, before purchasing the rank of lieutenant in December of the following year. Dugmore played first-class cricket for the Marylebone Cricket Club (MCC) in 1859, making a single appearance against Cambridge University at Lord's. Batting twice in the match, he ended the MCC first innings not out on 17, while in their second innings he opened the batting alongside Robert Grimston and was dismissed for 13 runs by Edward Drake. Later in 1859, he purchased the rank captain, transferring shortly after to the 8th Foot. He transferred regiments against in October 1864, joining the Scots Fusilier Guards. He purchased the rank of lieutenant colonel in the Guards in May 1871, before retiring five months later. Dugmore retired to Hamble-le-Rice in Hampshire, where he resided at the manor house in the village. He died there in May 1908.
