= William Franks (cricketer) =

English cricketer and British Army officer

Personal information
- Full name: William Franks
- Born: 23 July 1820; Hatfield, Hertfordshire, England
- Died: 8 February 1879 (aged 58); St Leonards-on-Sea, Sussex, England
- Batting: Unknown

Domestic team information
- Years: Team
- 1845–1848: Marylebone Cricket Club

Career statistics
| Competition | First-class |
|---|---|
| Matches | 7 |
| Runs scored | 44 |
| Batting average | 4.88 |
| 100s/50s | –/– |
| Top score | 16 |
| Catches/stumpings | 2/– |
- Source: Cricinfo, 19 April 2021

William Franks DL JP (23 July 1820 – 8 February 1879) was an English first-class cricketer and barrister.

Franks was born at Hatfield in July 1820. He was educated at Harrow School, before going up to Trinity College, Cambridge. A student of the Inner Temple, he was called to the bar in 1846. Franks played first-class cricket for the Marylebone Cricket Club from 1845 to 1848, making seven appearances. He had little success in his seven matches, scoring 44 runs with a highest score of 16. Franks twice served the Marquess of Salisbury as his official private secretary at Hatfield House, in 1852 and 1858–9. He also served as both a deputy lieutenant and justice of the peace for Hertfordshire, in addition to being a captain in the Hertfordshire Militia. Franks died at St Leonards-on-Sea in February 1879, after suffering from a long illness.
