= John Seton Karr =

English cricketer

Personal information
- Full name: John Seton Karr
- Born: 8 May 1813; Malda, Bengal Presidency, British India
- Died: 26 February 1884 (aged 70); Strachur, Argyll, Scotland
- Batting: Unknown
- Relatives: Walter Seton (nephew)

Domestic team information
- Years: Team
- 1837–1838: Marylebone Cricket Club
- 1837: Oxford University

Career statistics
Competition	First-class
Matches	4
Runs scored	51
Batting average	8.50
100s/50s	–/–
Top score	21*
Catches/stumpings	2/–
- Source: Cricinfo, 17 April 2020

John Seton Karr (13 May 1813 – 26 February 1884) was a Scottish first-class cricketer and clergyman.

The son of Andrew Seton Karr, he was born at Malda in British India in May 1813. He later studied in England at New College at the University of Oxford. While studying at Oxford, he made his debut in first-class cricket for the Marylebone Cricket Club (MCC) against Oxford University in 1837 at Oxford. He made two further appearances in first-class cricket at Lord's in 1837, playing for Oxford University against the MCC, and for the MCC against Cambridge University. The following year, he made a final first-class appearance for the MCC against Oxford University. In his four first-class matches, Seton Karr scored 51 runs with a high score of 21 not out.

After graduating from Oxford, Seton Karr took holy orders in the Church of England. He held one ecclesiastical post during his life, that of vicar of Berkeley in Gloucestershire until his death at Strachur in Scotland in February 1884. His nephew, Walter Seton, also played first-class cricket.
