= William Clayton (cricketer) =

English cricketer and British Army officer

Personal information
- Full name: William Clayton Clayton
- Born: 23 April 1839; Newcastle upon Tyne, Northumberland, England
- Died: 25 December 1876 (aged 37); Delhi, Punjab, British India
- Batting: Right-handed
- Role: Wicket-keeper

Domestic team information
- Years: Team
- 1861: Marylebone Cricket Club

Career statistics
Competition	First-class
Matches	6
Runs scored	90
Batting average	11.25
100s/50s	–/–
Top score	26
Catches/stumpings	0/4
- Source: Cricinfo, 16 August 2019

William Clayton Clayton (23 April 1839 – 25 December 1876) was an English first-class cricketer and British Army officer.

The son of W. C. Clayton of Bradford, he was born at Newcastle upon Tyne in April 1839. He was educated at Harrow School, where he was the first captain of the football XI. He made his debut in first-class cricket for the Gentlemen of England against the Gentlemen of Kent at Canterbury in 1858, with Clayton appearing for the Gentlemen of England the following season in the same fixture. From Harrow he enlisted in the British Army by purchasing the rank of ensign in the 84th Regiment of Foot in May 1859. He made two first-class appearances in 1861, playing for the Marylebone Cricket Club against Hampshire and for the Gentlemen of Marylebone Cricket Club against the Gentlemen of Kent, before playing once for the Gentlemen of Marylebone Cricket Club the following year in a repeat of the fixture. Continuing his military career, Clayton purchased the rank of lieutenant in March 1863. Four years later in March 1867, he was promoted to the rank of captain, before transferring to the 9th Queen's Royal Lancers in June 1867. In August 1867, Clayton made his final appearance in first-class cricket for the Gentlemen of Marylebone Cricket Club against Kent. He later died in British India in an accident during a polo match at Delhi in December 1876. The Clayton Scholarship was founded at Harrow School in his memory.
