= Henry Torre =

English cricketer, clergyman

Personal information
- Full name: Henry John Torre
- Born: 24 February 1819; Doncaster, Yorkshire, England
- Died: 2 February 1904 (aged 84); Norton Lindsey, Warwickshire, England
- Batting: Unknown
- Role: Wicket-keeper

Domestic team information
- Years: Team
- 1839: Marylebone Cricket Club
- 1839–1841: Oxford University

Career statistics
Competition	First-class
Matches	6
Runs scored	123
Batting average	11.18
100s/50s	–/–
Top score	23
Catches/stumpings	1/1
- Source: Cricinfo, 26 March 2020

Henry John Torre (24 February 1819 – 2 February 1904) was an English first-class cricketer and clergyman.

The son of Henry Torre senior, he was born at Doncaster in February 1819. He was educated at Harrow School, before going up to University College, Oxford. While studying at Oxford, he made his debut in first-class cricket for the Marylebone Cricket Club against Oxford University in 1839. He followed his up by playing for Oxford University against Cambridge University in that seasons University Match. He played four further first-class appearances for Oxford, playing three matches in 1840 and a single match in 1841. In six first-class matches, Torre scored 123 runs at an average of 11.18 and a high score of 23. He was a member of the University College Boat Club, which was Head of the River in 1840–41.

After graduating from Oxford, he took holy orders in the Church of England. Torre's first ecclesiastical post was as private secretary and domestic chaplain to Viscount Falkland from 1843 to 1846. He held the locum post of chaplain to the forces at Corfu in 1846. From 1861 to 1881, he was the chaplain of the chapel of Wroxall Abbey, after which he was the rector of Norton Lindsey, Warwickshire. He was the author of the book Recollections of Schooldays at Harrow more than Fifty Years Ago. Torre died at Norton Lindsey in February 1904.
