= Lewis Burnand =

English cricketer and stockbroker

Personal information
- Full name: Lewis Whitmore Burnand
- Born: 5 May 1839; Bloomsbury, Middlesex, England
- Died: 31 January 1923 (aged 83); Worthing, Sussex, England
- Batting: Unknown

Domestic team information
- Years: Team
- 1863–1864: Marylebone Cricket Club

Career statistics
Competition	First-class
Matches	2
Runs scored	4
Batting average	1.33
100s/50s	–/–
Top score	4
Balls bowled	24
Wickets	0
Bowling average	–
5 wickets in innings	–
10 wickets in match	–
Best bowling	–
Catches/stumpings	1/–
- Source: Cricinfo, 6 May 2021

Lewis Whitmore Burnand (5 May 1839 – 31 January 1923) was an English first-class cricketer and stockbroker.

The son of George Burnand, he was born in May 1839 in Bloomsbury. He was educated at Harrow School before going up to Corpus Christi College, Cambridge. He played first-class cricket for the Marylebone Cricket Club in 1863 and 1864, making two appearances against Cambridge University at Fenner's, though with little success. After graduating from Cambridge, Burnard worked as a stockbroker in the City of London and was a partner in the firm Burnand & Co. He died at Worthing in January 1923.
