= Greg Knight (businessman) =

Greg Knight is the founder and former chief executive of Welbeck Solutions. He was declared bankrupt on 1 July 2015 following the lapsing into Administration of his companies Welbeck Consulting and Welbeck Wealth Management in 2014. The firms were described by the London Evening Standard as "Britain's biggest seller of tax avoidance products".

Greg Knight Bankruptcy Notice - www.thegazette.co.uk/notice/2364940
