= Robert Anderson (MCC cricketer) =

English cricketer

Robert Milligan Anderson (8 August 1811 – 24 July 1891) was an English cricketer who played three first-class cricket matches for the Marylebone Cricket Club between 1837 and 1841. Very little is recorded of his feats, and his batting and bowling styles are not known, though he is recorded as an opening bat during his three first-class matches, and played for a 'Fast Bowlers' Invitational XI in 1841. An alumnus of Harrow School, he featured in its cricket team, and played for Hertfordshire between 1835 and 1836, as well as various invitational XI teams until 1846.

In his first-class career, he scored 39 runs at an average of 6.50 runs per innings, and took one wicket across his three matches. His debut game came on 21 August 1837 against the Gentlemen of Kent in which he opened the batting and scored 0 and 14; in his second game on 5 July 1841, he featured in the 'Fast Bowlers' Invitational XI against a 'Slow Bowlers' team, scoring 0 and 17; and his final match took place on 1 August 1841 against Sussex where he made 8 and 0, batting at No 4 in the second innings.
