= Robert Monypenny =

English cricketer and barrister

Personal information
- Full name: Robert Phillips Dearden Monypenny
- Born: 9 May 1836; Rolvenden, Kent, England
- Died: 4 May 1890 (aged 53); St Leonards-on-Sea, Sussex, England
- Batting: Unknown

Domestic team information
- Years: Team
- 1861–1862: Marylebone Cricket Club

Career statistics
Competition	First-class
Matches	2
Runs scored	17
Batting average	4.25
100s/50s	–/–
Top score	8
Catches/stumpings	–/–
- Source: Cricinfo, 26 September 2021

Robert Phillips Dearden Monypenny (9 May 1836 — 4 May 1890) was an English first-class cricketer and barrister.

The son of Robert Monypenny, he was born in May 1836 at Rolvenden, Kent. He studied at Trinity College at the University of Oxford. Monypenny played first-class cricket for the Marylebone Cricket Club on two occasions, against Oxford University at Oxford in 1861 and Sussex at Lord's in 1862. He scored 17 runs in these two matches, with a highest score of 8. A student of Lincoln's Inn, he was called to the bar in June 1864. He died at St Leonards-on-Sea in May 1890.
