= William Leake (cricketer) =

English cricketer (1831-1918)

William Martin Leake (23 April 1831 – 25 August 1918) was an English civil engineer and industrialist and a cricketer who played first-class cricket for Cambridge University, the Marylebone Cricket Club and other amateur sides in the 1850s. He was born at Marylebone in London and died at Newnham on Severn, Gloucestershire.

Educated at Rugby School and St John's College, Cambridge, Leake was placed 24th in the list of Wranglers in 1854. As a cricketer, he played as a batsman, sometimes opening the innings but more often in the middle order; it is not known if he was right-handed or left-handed. His figures are not impressive by modern standards, but he retained his place in the Cambridge team across four summers and appeared four times, from 1851 to 1854, in the annual University match against Oxford. His best innings came in his first appearance in this fixture in 1851, when he opened the batting and made a score of 66, which was the highest innings of the match. After graduating from Cambridge he played one game for a "Gentlemen of England" side in the summer of 1854 and once for MCC in 1858.

After graduating, Leake appears to have gone to Sri Lanka, then called "Ceylon", as a civil engineer but then to have become involved in the introduction tea and cinnamon as crops on the island. By 1873, he had returned to England and was manager of a cement works at Blackwall in London, and he is recorded as such in the 1881 England and Wales census, when he was living in West Dulwich. He retained interests in Sri Lankan tea plantations and as late as 1898 he was representing "tea interests" in Ceylon to a committee debating future currency arrangements for India.
