= Frederick Pigou =

English cricketer

Personal information
- Full name: Frederick John Pigou
- Born: 25 March 1815; Calcutta, Bengal Presidency, British India
- Died: 7 February 1847 (aged 31); Westminster, London, England
- Batting: Unknown

Domestic team information
- Years: Team
- 1836: Marylebone Cricket Club

Career statistics
Competition	First-class
Matches	4
Runs scored	42
Batting average	5.25
100s/50s	–/–
Top score	12
Catches/stumpings	2/–
- Source: ESPNcricinfo, 3 August 2020

Frederick John Pigou (27 March 1815 – 7 February 1847) was an English first-class cricketer.

The son of Henry Minchin Pigou and Elizabeth Bird, he was born in British India at Calcutta in March 1815. Pigou was later sent to England to attend Harrow School. Pigou played first-class cricket for the Marylebone Cricket Club in 1836, playing twice against Cambridge University and once against Oxford University. In the same year he played for the Gentlemen in the Gentlemen v Players fixture at Lord's. In his four first-class matches, Pigou scored 42 runs with a high score of 12. Shortly after leaving Harrow he married without the consent of his father and was disinherited. Pigou gained employment with the London and Birmingham Railway in 1840, becoming the first station master at Rugby railway station.

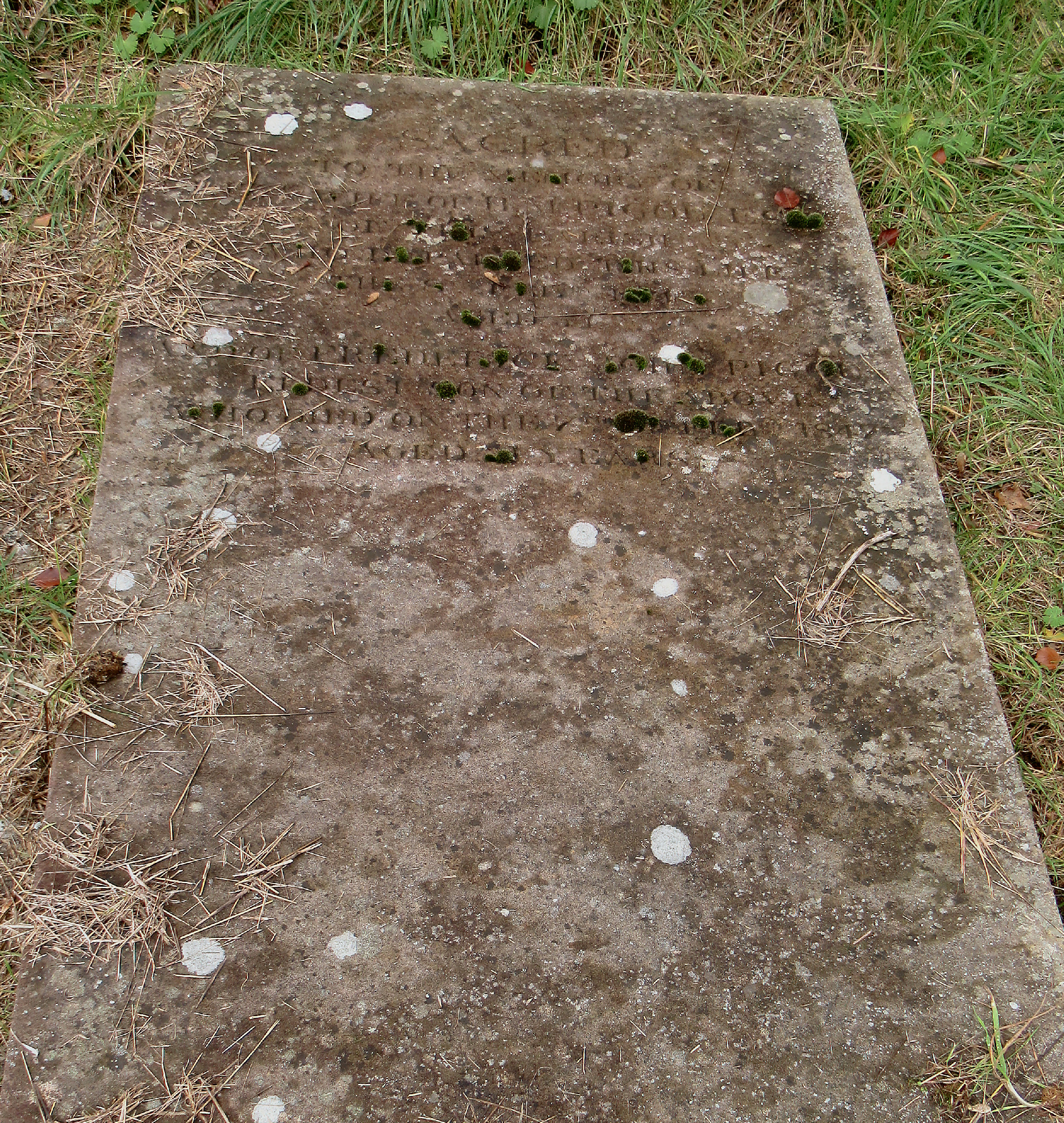
Grave at St Andrew's Church, Ham Common

He died at Westminster in February 1847, leaving his wife an annuity from dividends made on his investments.
