= George Kettle =

English cricketer (1810–1887)

George McKenzie Kettle (6 August 1810 – 13 October 1887) was an English first-class cricketer active from 1839 to 1852 who played for Nottinghamshire and Marylebone Cricket Club (MCC). He also played in non-first-class matches for Worcestershire, Leicestershire, Derbyshire, Staffordshire and, on two matches (in 1850 and 1852) for Shropshire while playing for Shrewsbury Cricket Club. He was born in Overseal, Leicestershire; died in Claverley, Shropshire aged 77.
