= Frederick Wells (cricketer, born 1867) =

English cricketer

Personal information
- Full name: Frederick Wells
- Born: 1 June 1867; Clayton, Sussex, England
- Died: 3 March 1926 (aged 58); Stanstead Abbotts, Hertfordshire, England
- Batting: Right-handed
- Bowling: Right-arm medium
- Relatives: George Wells (father)

Domestic team information
- Years: Team
- 1898: Hertfordshire
- 1891: Sussex

Career statistics
Competition	First-class
Matches	2
Runs scored	7
Batting average	3.50
100s/50s	–/–
Top score	7
Balls bowled	–
Wickets	–
Bowling average	–
5 wickets in innings	–
10 wickets in match	–
Best bowling	–
Catches/stumpings	–/–
- Source: Cricinfo, 7 October 2012

Frederick Wells (1 June 1867 – 3 March 1926) was an English cricketer. Wells was a right-handed batsman who bowled right-arm medium. He was born at Clayton, Sussex.

Wells made his first-class debut for Sussex against the Marylebone Cricket Club at Lord's in 1891. He made a further first-class appearance in that season, against Gloucestershire at Clifton College Ground in the County Championship. Wells scored 7 runs in his two first-class matches. Wells later played minor counties cricket for Hertfordshire, making his debut for the county in the 1898 Minor Counties Championship against Staffordshire. He made seven further appearances for Hertfordshire in that season, the last of which came against Buckinghamshire.

He died at Stanstead Abbotts, Hertfordshire, on 3 March 1926. His father, George, also played first-class cricket.
