= William Brown (MCC cricketer) =

English cricketer

Personal information
- Full name: William Brown

Domestic team information
- Years: Team
- 1836: Sussex
- 1837–1842: Marylebone Cricket Club
- 1843: Hampshire

Career statistics
Competition	First-class
Matches	8
Runs scored	123
Batting average	8.78
100s/50s	0/0
Top score	28
Catches/stumpings	4/–
- Source: Cricinfo, 1 May 2010

William Brown (dates of birth and death unknown) was an English cricketer.

Brown made his first-class cricket debut for Sussex County Cricket Club in 1836 against the Marylebone Cricket Club. Brown made one further appearance for Sussex in 1836 against the same opposition. Additionally, in 1836 he played a single match for the Gentlemen in the Gentlemen v Players fixture.

In 1837, he made his debut for the Marylebone Cricket Club against Oxford University. Brown next appeared in first-class cricket in 1842, once again for the Marylebone Cricket Club against Oxford University, with his final appearance for the club coming against Hampshire in the same year.

In 1843, Brown played two first-class matches for Hampshire; with both matches coming against Nottinghamshire.

In his overall first-class career he scored 123 runs at a batting average of 8.78, with a highest score of 44. In the field he took four catches.
