= Thomas Burgoyne (cricketer, born 1805) =

English cricketer

Thomas Burgoyne junior (30 December 1805 – 12 October 1879) was an English first-class cricketer active 1835–41 who played for Marylebone Cricket Club (MCC). The son of Thomas Burgoyne, he was born in Westminster and died in Chart, Surrey. He appeared in four first-class matches.

== Bibliography ==
- Haygarth, Arthur (1996) [1862]. Scores & Biographies, Volume 1 (1744–1826). Kennington: Frederick Lillywhite. ISBN 978-19-00592-23-9.
- Haygarth, Arthur (1997) [1862]. Scores & Biographies, Volume 2 (1827–1840). Kennington: Frederick Lillywhite. ISBN 978-19-00592-23-9.
