= William Paterson (cricketer) =

English cricketer and Indian Civil Service officer

Personal information
- Full name: William Smoult Paterson
- Born: 3 March 1819; Fort William, Bengal Presidency, British India
- Died: 8 June 1892 (aged 73); Notting Hill, London, England
- Batting: Unknown

Domestic team information
- Years: Team
- 1840: Marylebone Cricket Club

Career statistics
Competition	First-class
Matches	1
Runs scored	21
Batting average	–
100s/50s	–/–
Top score	21*
Catches/stumpings	–/–
- Source: Cricinfo, 24 October 2021

William Smoult Paterson (3 March 1819 — 8 June 1892) was an English first-class cricketer and an officer in the Indian Civil Service.

The son of Lieutenant William Paterson and Charlotte Frances Smoult, he was born at Fort William in British India in March 1819; both of his parents died within a week of one another in May 1819 from cholera, with Paterson being looked after by his grandmother in England. He was educated at both Harrow School and Haileybury College. Shortly after completing his education, Paterson played in a first-class cricket match for the Marylebone Cricket Club (MCC) against Cambridge University at Cambridge in 1840, scoring an unbeaten 21 in the MCC first innings. In the same year he was appointed to the Indian Civil Service, travelling to India where he was appointed joint magistrate and deputy collector at Bolundshuhu.

By the time of the Indian Rebellion of 1857, Paterson was a magistrate at Gorakhpur. He was preparing to depart the city on sick leave when the rebellion began, which prevented his departure. Order was largely maintained in Gorakhpur until July, when mutineering cavalry units from neighbouring Segowlee killed their officers and marched on Gorakhpur, necessitating his evacuation to Azamgarh. Following the quelling of the rebellion, Paterson was appointed a district and sessions judge at Farrukhabad in 1862, a post he held until his resignation in 1871. Paterson died in England at Notting Hill in June 1892.
