= Thomas Nixon (cricketer, born 1843) =

English cricketer and umpire

Personal information
- Full name: Thomas Henry Nixon
- Born: 24 January 1843; Sneinton, Nottinghamshire, England
- Died: 23 January 1907 (aged 64); Hillingdon, Middlesex, England
- Nickname: Thomas Nixon (father); Harry Nixon (son)
- Batting: Right-handed
- Bowling: Right-arm slow-medium

Domestic team information
- Years: Team
- 1862: Marylebone Cricket Club

Career statistics
| Competition | First-class |
|---|---|
| Matches | 2 |
| Runs scored | 15 |
| Batting average | 5.00 |
| 100s/50s | –/– |
| Top score | 9 |
| Balls bowled | 118 |
| Wickets | 4 |
| Bowling average | 19.00 |
| 5 wickets in innings | – |
| 10 wickets in match | – |
| Best bowling | 2/26 |
| Catches/stumpings | –/– |
- Source: Cricinfo, 7 May 2021

Thomas Henry Nixon (24 April 1843 – 23 January 1907) was an English first-class cricketer and umpire.

The son of the cricketer Thomas Nixon senior, he was born in April 1843 at Sneinton, Nottinghamshire. Nixon was engaged on the staff at Lord's, playing first-class cricket for the Marylebone Cricket Club. He played one first-class match for the Marylebone Cricket Club in 1862 against Middlesex, in addition to playing a second first-class match for the Professionals of Marylebone Cricket Club against the Gentlemen of Marylebone Cricket Club in 1867. He scored 15 runs across his two matches, in addition to taking 4 wickets with his right-arm slow-medium bowling. While engaged on the staff as Lord's, Nixon also stood as an umpire in seventeen first-class matches between 1862 and 1882. Nixon died at Hillingdon in January 1907. His son, Harry, also played first-class cricket.
