= Thomas Wickham =

English cricketer

Personal information
- Full name: Thomas Provis Wickham

Domestic team information
- Years: Team
- 1851: Marylebone Cricket Club
- 1850: Hampshire

Career statistics
Competition	FC
Matches	2
Runs scored	14
Batting average	4.66
100s/50s	–/–
Top score	10
Balls bowled	–
Wickets	–
Bowling average	–
5 wickets in innings	–
10 wickets in match	–
Best bowling	–
Catches/stumpings	–/–
- Source: Cricinfo, 29 April 2010

Thomas Provis Wickham (born 1810 in Weymouth, Dorset; died on 1 March 1890 in Machynlleth), may be best known as an English cricketer.

== Personal life ==
Wickham was the son of the reverend William Wickham and Margaret Provis, and brother of the reverend William Provis Trelawney Wickham (Rector of Shepton Mallet, the building of the Wickham Almshouses by his widow, was made possible by a bequest from his will). He had two sisters, Annabella (who married James Bennett, Sheriff of Somerset) and Caroline.

According to Bernard Burke the Wickhams (of Horsington) were an ancient Somerset family, belonging to the landed gentry.

In 1835 he married Sarah Hussey.

Little is known about him other than that he was a "gentleman". It is suggested that he spent some time in a debtors' prison.

== Cricket ==
Wickham made his first-class debut and his only appearance for Hampshire against an All England Eleven in 1850. In 1851, Wickham made his last first class appearance for the Marylebone Cricket Club against Cambridge University.
