= Wynyard Battye =

English cricketer and British Army officer

Personal information
- Full name: Wynyard Battye
- Born: 9 January 1838; Berhampur, Madras Presidency, British India (now in Odisha)
- Died: 10 February 1882 (aged 44); Weybridge, Surrey, England
- Batting: Unknown

Domestic team information
- Years: Team
- 1859: Marylebone Cricket Club

Career statistics
Competition	First-class
Matches	1
Runs scored	2
Batting average	2.00
100s/50s	–/–
Top score	2
Catches/stumpings	–/–
- Source: Cricinfo, 23 September 2021

Wynyard Battye (9 January 1838 – 10 February 1882) was an English first-class cricketer and British Indian Army officer.

The son of George Wynyard Battye-Cumming and Marion Martha Money, he was born in January 1838 at Berhampur in British India. Through his mother's side, it is a possibility that he was the illegitimate grandson of Princess Elizabeth of the United Kingdom, making George III his great-grandfather. Battye served in the British Indian Army during the Indian Rebellion of 1857, holding a commission with the 65th Bengal Native Infantry.

Battye went to England following the suppression of the insurgency, where he played a first-class cricket match for the Marylebone Cricket Club (MCC) against Kent at Maidstone in June 1859. Batting twice in the match, he was dismissed for 2 runs in the MCC first innings by George Wigzell, while in their second innings he was dismissed without scoring by Edgar Willsher. Returning to British India, he was promoted to lieutenant in November 1864, before being promoted to captain in April 1866. He was promoted to major in April 1874 and served in the Second Anglo-Afghan War from 1878 to 1880. Battye died in England at Weybridge in February 1882.
