= William Strahan (cricketer) =

English cricketer

William Strahan (21 August 1807 – 2 July 1886), formerly William Snow, was an English first-class cricketer active from 1832 to 1849 who played for Surrey. He was born in Westminster and died in Perugia. He appeared in 26 first-class matches as a batsman who did not bowl. He scored 272 runs with a highest score of 22 not out and held five catches.
