= David Denne =

English cricketer

David Denne (1799 – 3 December 1861) was an English cricketer associated with Kent who was active in the 1820s. He is recorded in two matches in 1823, totalling 10 runs with a highest score of 6. His brother Thomas and his son Lambert also appeared in cricket matches that have since been adjudged top-class.

He was also Deputy Lieutenant and justice of the peace for the County of Kent, and formerly Captain of the East Kent and Cinque Ports Yeomanry, and Bailiff of the town Corporation 23 times.

== Bibliography ==
- Carlaw, Derek (2020). Kent County Cricketers, A to Z: Part One (1806–1914) (PDF). Cardiff: ACS.
- Haygarth, Arthur (1996) [1862]. Scores & Biographies, Volume 1 (1744–1826). Kennington: Frederick Lillywhite. ISBN 978-19-00592-23-9.
- Haygarth, Arthur (1997) [1862]. Scores & Biographies, Volume 2 (1827–1840). Kennington: Frederick Lillywhite. ISBN 978-19-00592-23-9.
