= Henry Veitch =

English cricketer

Personal information
- Full name: Henry George John Veitch
- Born: 26 September 1833; Sopley, Hampshire, England
- Died: 30 May 1903 (aged 69); Sanquhar, Dumfriesshire, Scotland
- Batting: Unknown
- Bowling: Unknown

Domestic team information
- Years: Team
- 1854–1856: Oxford University
- 1856: Marylebone Cricket Club

Career statistics
Competition	First-class
Matches	10
Runs scored	177
Batting average	16.09
100s/50s	–/–
Top score	38
Balls bowled	203
Wickets	7
Bowling average	14.00
5 wickets in innings	–
10 wickets in match	–
Best bowling	3/?
Catches/stumpings	9/–
- Source: Cricinfo, 6 March 2020

Henry George John Veitch (26 September 1833 – 30 May 1903) was an English first-class cricketer and clergyman.

The son of William Douglas Veitch, he was born in September 1833 at Sopley, Hampshire. He later studied at Balliol College, Oxford where he played first-class cricket for Oxford University. He made his debut against the Marylebone Cricket Club (MCC) at Oxford in 1854. Veitch played first-class cricket for Oxford until 1856, making eight appearances. In his eight matches for Oxford, he scored 149 runs at an average of 18.62 and a high score of 38. He also played two first-class matches for the MCC in 1856 against Sussex and Kent. In his ten first-class matches, he took 7 wickets.

After graduating from Oxford, Veitch took holy orders in the Church of England and became the vicar of Kilmersdon, Somerset in 1864. He married Sibella Matilda Cameron, daughter of Clan Cameron chief Donald Cameron, 23rd Lochiel in 1865. He died in Scotland at Sanquhar in May 1903.
