= Rowland Jones-Bateman =

English cricketer

Personal information
- Full name: Rowland Jones-Bateman
- Born: 10 November 1826; St Pancras, London, England
- Died: 16 December 1896 (aged 70); Otterbourne, Hampshire, England
- Batting: Unknown
- Relatives: John Jones-Bateman (brother)

Domestic team information
- Years: Team
- 1849: Marylebone Cricket Club
- 1846–1848: Oxford University

Career statistics
| Competition | First-class |
|---|---|
| Matches | 8 |
| Runs scored | 115 |
| Batting average | 8.21 |
| 100s/50s | –/– |
| Top score | 22* |
| Balls bowled | – |
| Wickets | – |
| Bowling average | – |
| 5 wickets in innings | – |
| 10 wickets in match | – |
| Best bowling | – |
| Catches/stumpings | 2/– |
- Source: Cricinfo, 7 November 2013

Rowland Jones-Bateman (10 November 1826 – 16 December 1896) was an English cricketer active in the 1840s, making eight appearances in first-class cricket. Born at St Pancras, London, Jones-Bateman was a batsman of unknown style who was mostly associated with Oxford University.

== Career ==
The son of John Jones-Bateman, he was educated at Winchester College, before attending New College, Oxford and a student of Lincoln's Inn. While studying at the university, Jones-Bateman played first-class cricket for the university cricket club, debuting against the Marylebone Cricket Club (MCC) in 1846. He made six further first-class appearances for the university, all of which came against the MCC. He scored 84 runs at an average of 6.46, with a high score of 22. He later made a single first-class appearance for the MCC against Oxford University in 1849. Later a member of the Inner Temple, he was called to the bar on 30 April 1852.

He died at Otterbourne, Hampshire on 16 December 1896. His brother John Jones-Bateman also played first-class cricket.
