= Abram Rawlinson =

English cricketer and solicitor

Personal information
- Full name: Abram Lindow Rawlinson
- Born: 7 September 1805; Charlbury, Oxfordshire, England
- Died: 6 August 1875 (aged 69); Chipping Norton, Oxfordshire, England
- Batting: Unknown
- Relatives: George Rawlinson (brother)

Domestic team information
- Years: Team
- 1849–1853: Marylebone Cricket Club

Career statistics
Competition	First-class
Matches	5
Runs scored	30
Batting average	4.28
100s/50s	–/–
Top score	11
Catches/stumpings	–/–
- Source: Cricinfo, 26 September 2021

Abram Lindow Rawlinson (7 September 1805 — 6 August 1875) was an English first-class cricketer and solicitor.

The son of Abraham Tyzack Rawlinson, he was born in September 1805 at Charlbury, Oxfordshire. He was educated at Rugby School. He was by profession a solicitor. Rawlinson played first-class cricket for the Marylebone Cricket Club on five occasions against Oxford University between 1849 and 1853. He had little success in his these five matches, scoring 30 runs at an average of 4.28 and a highest score of 11. He was a mayor of Chipping Norton until his resignation in November 1873. Rawlinson died at Chipping Norton in August 1875. He had two brothers: George, who was a first-class cricketer and historian, and Sir Henry, who was a British Army officer and politician.
