= James Hill (cricketer) =

English cricketer and barrister

Personal information
- Full name: James Eardley Hill
- Born: 5 July 1832; St Pancras, Middlesex, England
- Died: 8 October 1899 (aged 67); Paddington, London, England
- Batting: Unknown

Domestic team information
- Years: Team
- 1857: Marylebone Cricket Club

Career statistics
Competition	First-class
Matches	2
Runs scored	21
Batting average	7.00
100s/50s	–/–
Top score	18
Catches/stumpings	–/–
- Source: Cricinfo, 11 June 2021

James Eardley Hill (5 July 1832 – 8 October 1899) was an English first-class cricketer and barrister.

The son of the barrister Hugh Hill, he was born at St Pancras in July 1832. He was educated at Harrow School, before going up to Trinity College, Cambridge. He was admitted to the Middle Temple in April 1855 and was called to the bar to practise as a barrister in November 1858, with Hill practising on the North Eastern Circuit. A keen amateur cricketer, he played two first-class cricket matches for the Marylebone Cricket Club in 1857, against Cambridge University and Kent. He scored 21 runs in his two matches, with a highest score of 18. Hill died in October 1899 at his residence in Paddington, following a short illness.
