= Robert Allan Fitzgerald =

English cricketer and administrator

Cricket information
- Batting: Right-handed
- Bowling: Right-arm fast

Career statistics
Competition	First-class
Matches	46
Runs scored	1,123
Batting average	15.59
100s/50s	0/5
Top score	91*
Balls bowled	256
Wickets	7
Bowling average	28
5 wickets in innings	0
10 wickets in match	0
Best bowling	3/23
Catches/stumpings	34/0
- Source: CricketArchive, 27 June 2020

Robert Allan "Fitz" Fitzgerald (1 October 1834 – 28 October 1881) was an English cricketer and administrator who served as Marylebone Cricket Club (MCC) Secretary.

Fitzgerald was born at Purley House in Berkshire, but was brought up at Shalstone Manor, Bucks – his mother – Sarah Anne Elizabeth Purefoy Jervoise' family home. He was educated at Harrow from 1847 to 1852, playing for the Harrow XI in 1852. He proceeded to Trinity College, Cambridge, where he played for Cambridge University in 1854 and 1856.

As a right-handed batsman and a round-arm right-arm fast bowler, he represented Cambridge University, MCC, Middlesex, in 46 first-class matches between 1854 and 1874. He also played for I Zingari, the Gentleman of MCC, Buckinghamshire and Hertfordshire. Between 1854 and 1874 he played 50 matches per year and in 1866 scored over 1,000 runs.

Fitzgerald was popular and witty. Lord Harris wrote of him: "Whether it was the magnificence of his swagger, the luxuriance of his beard, the fun that rolled out of him so easily, or the power of his swiping, I do not know, but as regards each he could not escape notice." Harris accompanied Fitzgerald on the first MCC tour abroad to North America in 1872. Fitzgerald's own book, Wickets in the West was published in 1873 and records this tour. Among the tour party was WG Grace who had been proposed by Fitzgerald in 1867 as a member of MCC.

He succeeded Alfred Baillie as Secretary of the MCC (1863–1876), Fitzgerald sought greater influence for MCC "off the field" and did much to help improve Lord's Cricket Ground and its facilities. He became MCC's first paid secretary in 1865.

Fitzgerald was brother-in-law to his close friend Hon Sir Edward Chandos Leigh. They were both members of I Zingari on regular tours to Ireland; to Paris in 1867 and around the country estates of England and Wales. Both enjoyed the pleasures of touring and entertaining their hosts in amateur dramatics. This is recorded in Fitzgerald's own cricketing scrapbook and also John Lorraine Baldwin's scrapbooks dating back to the origin of the I Zingari in 1845.

In 1876, Fitzgerald was asked to resign his post as MCC secretary due to deteriorating health. It has been speculated that he contracted neurosyphilis, which incidentally was the same illness that killed Lord Randolph Churchill. Fitzgerald died in 1881 at his home in Chorleywood, Hertfordshire, at the age of 47.

A tangible memorial to him is on display at the MCC museum: his illustrated scrapbooks recording matches played between 1859 – 1866. The book contains the earliest cricketing photographs taken. Fitzgerald was also a keen amateur photographer.

Fitzgerald also wrote a humorous book titled Jerks in from Short Leg ^{1}published in 1865 and contributed to numerous cricketing publications including Bell's Life between 1859 – 1874. He also proof-read Arthur Haygarth's Score & Biographies which MCC supported during his time as secretary.

The Hon Sir Edward Chandos Leigh as President of MCC in 1887 paid homage to Fitzgerald. In his autobiography Bar, Bat and Bit, Leigh wrote: "It was, I think, a fortunate thing for the Club and for the cricketing world generally when he (Fitzgerald) became secretary, for a new era seems to have dawned at Lord's with his arrival, and all the vast improvements which took place there owed their origin, inception, and development to his fertile brain and his untiring energy".
