= Russell Aldridge =

English cricketer

Personal information
- Full name: Russell Aldridge
- Born: 5 August 1831; Christchurch, Hampshire, England
- Died: 27 August 1895 (aged 64); St Pancras, London, England
- Batting: Unknown

Domestic team information
- Years: Team
- 1855: Marylebone Cricket Club

Career statistics
Competition	First-class
Matches	1
Runs scored	3
Batting average	1.50
100s/50s	–/–
Top score	2
Balls bowled	–
Wickets	–
Bowling average	–
5 wickets in innings	–
10 wickets in match	–
Best bowling	–
Catches/stumpings	–/–
- Source: Cricinfo, 1 May 2014

Russell Aldridge (5 August 1831 – 27 August 1895) was an English first-class cricketer. Born at Christchurch, Hampshire, Aldridge made a single appearance in first-class cricket for the Marylebone Cricket Club against the Sussex in 1855 at E. Tredcroft's Ground, Horsham, scoring 3 runs during the match, which was won by Sussex. He died at St Pancras, London.
