= Halifax Wyatt =

English cricketer

Personal information
- Full name: Michael Thomas Halifax Wyatt
- Born: 26 April 1829; North Wraxall, Wiltshire, England
- Died: 5 March 1909 (aged 79); Westminster, London, England
- Batting: Unknown

Domestic team information
- Years: Team
- 1850–1851: Oxford University
- 1858: Marylebone Cricket Club

Career statistics
Competition	First-class
Matches	3
Runs scored	78
Batting average	9.75
100s/50s	–/–
Top score	17*
Catches/stumpings	1/–
- Source: Cricinfo, 8 November 2018

Michael Thomas Halifax Wyatt (26 April 1829 – 5 March 1909) was an English first-class cricketer.

Born at North Wraxall in Wiltshire, Wyatt studied at Exeter College, Oxford. A member of the Oxford University Cricket Club, Wyatt made his debut in first-class cricket for the university in 1850 against the Marylebone Cricket Club (MCC) at Oxford. He made three further first-class appearances for the university, the last coming in 1851 against Cambridge University at Lord's. He made two further appearances in first-class cricket for the MCC against Cambridge University and Oxford University in 1858. Playing a total of six first-class matches, he scored 78 runs at an average of 9.75, with a highest score of 17 not out. He died at Westminster in March 1909.
