= Henry Stubberfield =

English cricketer (1835–1918)

Henry Stubberfield (16 March 1835 – 14 February 1918) was an English cricketer active from 1857 to 1874 who played for Sussex. He was born and died in Brighton. He appeared in 61 first-class matches as a righthanded batsman who bowled right-arm fast medium with a roundarm action. He scored 518 runs with a highest score of 40 and took 141 wickets with a best performance of seven for 10.
