= Thomas Tuck =

English cricketer and clergyman

Personal information
- Full name: Thomas Ridout Tuck
- Born: 1812; Witton, Norfolk, England
- Died: 7 March 1885 (aged 72); Epping, Essex, England
- Batting: Unknown

Domestic team information
- Years: Team
- 1832–1842: Marylebone Cricket Club

Career statistics
Competition	First-class
Matches	9
Runs scored	77
Batting average	5.92
100s/50s	–/–
Top score	20
Catches/stumpings	1/–
- Source: Cricinfo, 13 August 2021

Thomas Ridout Tuck (1812 – 7 March 1885) was an English first-class cricketer and clergyman.

The son of John Johnson Tuck, he was born in 1812 at Witton, Norfolk. He was educated at Wymondham Grammar School, before going up to Caius College, Cambridge. Tuck was a keen cricketer, making his debut in first-class cricket for the Marylebone Cricket Club (MCC) against The Bs at Lord's in 1832. He played first-class cricket for the MCC until 1842, making a further eight appearances. In sixteen innings across his nine matches, Tuck scored 77 runs at an average of 5.92, with a highest score of 20. After graduating from Cambridge, Tuck was ordained as a deacon in the Church of England in 1848 at Chester Cathedral. He was appointed curate of Redmile in Leicestershire in 1851, before being appointed perpetual curate of St John-the-Baptist at Epping in 1852, an appointment he would hold until his retirement in 1882. Tuck died at Epping in March 1885, aged 72.
