= Barrington Mills =

English cricketer and clergyman

Personal information
- Full name: Barrington Stopford Thomas Mills
- Born: 30 September 1821; Great Saxham, Suffolk, England
- Died: 5 February 1899 (aged 77); Bury St Edmunds, Suffolk, England
- Batting: Unknown
- Bowling: Unknown

Domestic team information
- Years: Team
- 1841–1843: Oxford University

Career statistics
Competition	First-class
Matches	11
Runs scored	39
Batting average	2.78
100s/50s	–/–
Top score	13
Balls bowled	?
Wickets	34
Bowling average	?
5 wickets in innings	3
10 wickets in match	–
Best bowling	6/?
Catches/stumpings	3/–
- Source: Cricinfo, 15 June 2020

Barrington Stopford Thomas Mills (30 September 1821 – 5 February 1899) was an English first-class cricketer and clergyman.

The son of The Reverend Thomas Mills, he was born in September 1821 at Great Saxham, Suffolk. He was educated at Harrow School, before going up to Christ Church, Oxford. While studying at Oxford, he played first-class cricket for Oxford University from 1841–43, making eight appearances. In addition to playing for Oxford, Mills also made three first-class appearances for the Marylebone Cricket Club in 1844 and 1845. Playing as a bowler, he took a total of 34 wickets in his eleven first-class matches, taking a five wicket haul on three occasions.

After graduating from Oxford, Mills took holy orders in the Church of England in 1858. He served as the rector of Lawshall from 1858 until his death at Bury St Edmunds in 1899. Mills was married to Georgiana Penelope Sturt, the daughter of Henry Sturt and Lady Charlotte Penelope Brudenell, with her predeceasing him by two years.
