= William Goulding (cricketer) =

English cricketer

Personal information
- Full name: William Goulding
- Born: 3 March 1813; Enfield, Middlesex, England
- Died: 11 June 1878 (aged 65); Hampstead, Middlesex, England
- Batting: Unknown
- Role: Wicket-keeper

Domestic team information
- Years: Team
- 1851: Middlesex
- 1862: Marylebone Cricket Club

Career statistics
Competition	First-class
Matches	3
Runs scored	18
Batting average	4.50
100s/50s	–/–
Top score	6
Catches/stumpings	–/1
- Source: Cricinfo, 5 June 2021

William Goulding (3 March 1813 – 11 June 1878) was an English first-class cricketer.

Goulding was born at Enfield in March 1813. A club cricketer for St John's Wood, Goulding played first-class cricket for Middlesex twice in 1851, against the Marylebone Cricket Club (MCC) at Lord's and Surrey at The Oval, scoring 14 runs across both matches. He later made a single first-class appearance for the MCC against Middlesex at Lord's in 1862, making a single stumping in his capacity as wicket-keeper. Goulding died at Hampstead in June 1878.
