= Duncan Baillie =

Scottish cricketer and British Army officer (1826–1890)

Lieutenant-General Duncan Baillie DL JP
- Born: Duncan James Baillie; 18 October 1826; Marylebone, Middlesex, England
- Died: 27 July 1890 (aged 63); Nairn, Nairnshire, Scotland
- Cricket career

Personal information
- Batting: Unknown
- Relatives: Alfred Baillie (brother)

Domestic team information
- Years: Team
- 1850: Marylebone Cricket Club

Career statistics
Competition	First-class
Matches	1
Runs scored	12
Batting average	6.00
100s/50s	–/–
Top score	8
Catches/stumpings	–/–
- Source: Cricinfo, 18 October 2021

Lieutenant-General Duncan James Baillie DL JP (18 October 1826 — 27 July 1890) was a Scottish first-class cricketer and British Army officer.

The son of the Scot Colonel Hugh Duncan Baillie of Redcastle, he was born at Marylebone in October 1826 and was educated at Eton College. He was commissioned into the Royal Horse Guards when he purchased the rank of cornet in February 1845, with Baillie later purchasing the rank of lieutenant in September 1847. He played first-class cricket for the Marylebone Cricket Club (MCC) against Cambridge University at Fenner's in 1850. Playing alongside his brother Alfred in the MCC side, he was dismissed in their first innings for 8 runs by David Buchanan, while in their second innings he was dismissed by the same bowler for 4 runs. In April 1854, he purchased the rank of captain, later purchasing the rank of major in June 1866. In December of the same year he purchased the rank of lieutenant colonel, with promotion to colonel under the provisions of the Royal Warrant following in June 1871. Baillie retired from active service in December 1875 and was placed on the half-pay list. He was made a lieutenant-general in March 1882. Baillie was a deputy lieutenant and justice of the peace for the County of Nairnshire. He died at Nairn in July 1890. Baillie was married to Anne Glentworth Burnaby in 1862, with whom he had eleven children. His eldest son Ronald Hugh Baillie became an advocate in the Scottish courts and followed his father to become a justice of the peace and deputy lieutenant in Nairnshire and married the daughter of the Lord Lieutenant of Nairn, James Rose, 23rd of Kilravock.
