= Philip Williams (cricketer, born 1824) =

English cricketer and cleric

Personal information
- Born: 7 September 1824; Eton, Berkshire
- Died: 18 November 1899 (aged 75); Bath, Somerset
- Batting: Right-handed

Domestic team information
- Years: Team
- 1844–47: Oxford University
- 1845: Nottinghamshire
- Source: Cricinfo, 27 March 2014

Philip Williams (7 September 1824 – 18 November 1899) was an English cleric and cricketer.

He was educated at Winchester College, where he played cricket for the school 1840–42, and New College, Oxford, matriculating in 1841. There he played for the University 1844–47 and also played for Nottinghamshire in 1845.

Williams was a Fellow of New College from 1844 to 1851, when he graduated B.C.L. He was called to the bar at Lincoln's Inn the same year, but did not practise as a barrister. He instead became a Church of England priest. He was rector of Rewe, Devon, 1860–92.
