= Henry Lindow =

English cricketer

Personal information
- Full name: Henry William Lindow
- Born: 8 March 1824; Cheltenham, Gloucestershire, England
- Died: 16 February 1887 (aged 62); Westminster, London, England
- Batting: Unknown
- Bowling: Unknown-arm fast

Domestic team information
- Years: Team
- 1849: Marylebone Cricket Club

Career statistics
Competition	First-class
Matches	4
Runs scored	36
Batting average	4.50
100s/50s	–/–
Top score	11
Catches/stumpings	1/–
- Source: Cricinfo, 14 July 2019

Henry William Lindow (8 March 1824 – 16 February 1887) was an English first-class cricketer.

Lindow was born at Cheltenham in March 1824. He lived at Moreton-in-Marsh when he was a child and was educated at Rugby School. He purchased a commission as a cornet in the 17th Lancers in July 1844. The following year he was promoted to the rank of lieutenant. He made his debut in first-class cricket for the Fast Bowlers in the Fast v Slow match of 1849 at Lord's. He made three further first-class appearances in 1849, appearing for the Marylebone Cricket Club against Oxford University, as well as playing twice for an All England Eleven against Kent and Hampshire. He scored 36 runs in his four matches, with a high score of 11. He died at Westminster in February 1887.
