= James Chester (cricketer) =

English cricketer

Personal information
- Born: 30 May 1823; Kingston upon Thames, Surrey, England
- Died: 23 June 1888 (aged 65); Wimbledon, Surrey, England
- Role: All-rounder

James Chester (30 May 1823 – 23 June 1888) was an English first-class cricketer. He was active between 1846 and 1859, playing domestically for Surrey. He was born in Kingston-upon-Thames and died in Wimbledon. He was an all-rounder and played in 45 first-class matches.
