= Frederick W. Wells =

American civil rights lawyer

Frederick W. Wells was an American lawyer, public official, and civil rights organizer. While a law student at Columbia Law School in New York City in the 1920s, fellow students protested his living in a residence hall because he was African American, for which he received threats. Student organizers burned a cross outside his residence hall, drawing press coverage. The college stood by his right to live on campus but did not punish fellow law student organizers of the cross-burning and failed to act to address or take action to root out discrimination on its campus. The New York Public Library has a collection of papers including letters sent supporting him.

== See also ==
- Dunning School
- George Edmund Haynes, sociologist who was the first African American to earn a doctorate degree from Columbia University
