= William Stanley Sykes =

British anaesthetist and crime writer

William Stanley Sykes (1894–1961), M.R.C.S., L.R.C.P., M.B., B.Chir., M.B.E., was a British anaesthetist and crime writer.

== Life ==
Sykes was born in Morley, West Yorkshire, on 5 August 1894. He was educated at Rossall School and Emmanuel College, Cambridge, served in the RNVR for part of the First World War, and continued his medical training at St Bartholomew's Hospital, London. There he was house surgeon, extern midwifery assistant, and house anaesthetist. He returned to Morley as a general practitioner, but later became anaesthetist to Leeds General Infirmary and St James's Hospital, Leeds. He also served as a local government medical officer and public vaccinator.

At the beginning of the Second World War he joined the Royal Army Medical Corps with the rank of Major, but was captured in the Battle of Greece and spent four years as a prisoner of war. He worked as an anaesthetist for fellow prisoners in Stalag VIII-B. After the war he returned to general practice and spent more time on his writing.

He died unexpectedly on 31 March 1961.

== Publications ==
Sykes contributed an entry to the 14th edition of the Encyclopaedia Britannica on the experimental use of acetylene as an inhalation anesthetic. His books include:

Medical

- A Manual of General Medical Practice (1927)
- Modern Treatment: Anaesthesia (1931)
- Essays on the First Hundred Years of Anaesthesia (3 vols., 1960–1982)

Thrillers

- The Mystery of the Missing Money Lender (1931)
- The Ray of Doom (1932)
- The Harness of Death (1935)
