= Thomas Denne =

English cricketer

Thomas Denne (25 January 1808 – 11 August 1876) was an English cricketer with amateur status. He was a student at Christ Church, Oxford, and played for Oxford University in 1827 and for Marylebone Cricket Club (MCC) and other teams in 1832. His brother David and his nephew Lambert also played.
