= Gregory Knight (cricketer) =

English cricketer

Personal information
- Full name: Gregory Knight
- Born: 18 April 1832; Kilby, Leicestershire, England
- Died: 26 September 1898 (aged 66); Leamington Spa, Warwickshire, England
- Batting: Unknown

Domestic team information
- Years: Team
- 1853: Marylebone Cricket Club

Career statistics
Competition	First-class
Matches	1
Runs scored	7
Batting average	3.50
100s/50s	–/–
Top score	5
Catches/stumpings	1/–
- Source: Cricinfo, 28 August 2021

Gregory Knight JP (18 April 1832 — 26 September 1898) was an English first-class cricketer.

Knight was born in Leicestershire at Kilby in April 1832, and was later educated at Harrow School. He played first-class cricket for the Marylebone Cricket Club (MCC) in 1853, against Cambridge University at Fenner's. Batting twice in the match, he was dismissed for 5 runs in the MCC first innings by Charles Pontifex, while in their second innings he was dismissed by Ward Maule for 2 runs. Knight was later commissioned into the Leicestershire Militia as a lieutenant in March 1865, with promotion to captain following in June 1867. In July 1881, the Leicestershire Militia became part of Leicestershire Regiment as part of the Cardwell Reforms. Knight was promoted to major in November 1881. In addition to his military service, he was also a justice of the peace for Leicestershire. Knight died at Leamington Spa in September 1898.
