= Roger Kynaston =

English cricketer

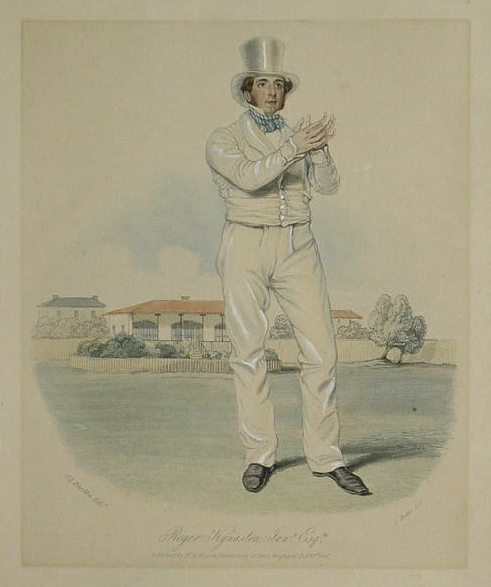

Personal information
- Full name: Roger Kynaston
- Born: 5 November 1805; Marylebone, London
- Died: 21 June 1874 (aged 68); Marylebone, London
- Batting: Right-handed

Domestic team information
- Years: Team
- 1830–1854: Marylebone Cricket Club
- Source: CricketArchive, 15 April 2013

Roger Kynaston (5 November 1805 – 21 June 1874) was an English cricketer who was Honorary Secretary of Marylebone Cricket Club (MCC) from 1842 to 1858. As a player, Kynaston was active from 1830 to 1854. He played mainly for MCC teams but also represented Middlesex and played for the Gentlemen in the Gentlemen v Players series. A right-handed batsman who never bowled, he is recorded in 166 matches, totalling 2,618 runs at the low average of 9.15 with a highest score of 54 and holding 43 catches.

Kynaston was MCC's second Secretary, succeeding Benjamin Aislabie. He tried to improve conditions for cricket's professionals but, according to Pelham Warner, he was "somewhat fussy" and his relationships with the MCC staff were not always good. However, Warner points out that Kynaston held office during "a difficult period" of MCC's history. He was succeeded in 1858 by Alfred Baillie.
