= Walter Bearblock =

English cricketer

Walter Bearblock (20 October 1796 – 1 February 1857) was an English cricketer with amateur status who was active from 1831 to 1832. He was born in Hornchurch, Essex and died in London. He made his debut in 1831 and appeared in two matches an unknown handedness batsman whose bowling style is unknown, playing for Marylebone Cricket Club (MCC) and for The Bs. He scored three runs with a highest score of 2 and took no wickets.

== Bibliography ==
- Haygarth, Arthur (1996) [1862]. Scores & Biographies, Volume 1 (1744–1826). Kennington: Frederick Lillywhite. ISBN 978-19-00592-23-9.
- Haygarth, Arthur (1997) [1862]. Scores & Biographies, Volume 2 (1827–1840). Kennington: Frederick Lillywhite. ISBN 978-19-00592-23-9.
