= George Caldwell (cricketer) =

English cricketer

George Caldwell (8 January 1807 – 5 March 1863) was an English cricketer who made his debut in 1829.

== Early life ==
He was born at Hilborough in Norfolk in 1807, the second son of Ralph Caldwell and his wife Louisa Isham, daughter of Sir Justinian Isham, 7th Baronet. He studied at Merton College, Oxford, graduating BA in 1829.

== Cricketer ==
Caldwell played in a total of 10 important matches between 1829 and 1833, primarily for Marylebone Cricket Club (MCC). He played club cricket, mainly for teams across Norfolk between 1829 and 1831 and later for MCC.

His brother, Henry Berney Caldwell, also played, making five appearances in 1832.

== Journalism ==
Caldwell wrote articles about sport for The Field and Bell's Life in London under the pseudonym Childers and for Spirit of the Times in New York under the name Censor. As "Censor" he wrote open letters in Sporting Life, in 1859 attacking the former Member of Parliament Apsley Pellatt, who had proposed regulation of betting tips in newspapers. He went on to attack the Jockey Club and Albert, Prince Consort. He was replaced by Henry Hall Dixon.

Caldwell died in 1863 at Ramsgate in Kent aged 56. (Note: Caldwell's date of death is given at 1880 by CricInfo. The dates provided by CricketArchive and Boase have been used in this article.)
