= William Sykes (cricketer) =

English cricketer and clergyman

William Sykes (21 November 1823 – 13 February 1915) was an English clergyman and a cricketer who played in five first-class cricket matches between 1844 and 1849. He was born at Melton Mowbray in Leicestershire and died at Vauxhall, London.

Sykes was educated at Emmanuel College, Cambridge. As a cricketer, he was a lower-order batsman and apparently a bowler, though only limited statistics are available for the matches he played in, and his bowling and batting styles are unknown. He is credited with taking three wickets in the first of his two first-class matches for Cambridge University, which was the 1844 University Match against Oxford University; he also bowled nine wides, though other details of his bowling are missing. He then played single first-class games in each of the four seasons from 1846 to 1849 for four different sides, though all of the matches were held in Cambridge.

Sykes graduated from Cambridge University in 1847 with a Bachelor of Arts degree; this was automatically converted to a Master of Arts in 1850. His subsequent career is in parts unclear. He was vicar of Dorrington, Lincolnshire from 1862 to 1886, but the directory of Cambridge University alumni states that he then "fell upon evil times, being employed selling bootlaces in London streets c 1902". He died at one of the Rowton Houses for destitute people at Vauxhall in London in 1915, aged 91.
