= Lambert Denne =

English cricketer and soldier

Major-General Lambert Henry Denne (21 January 1831 – 13 December 1898) was an English soldier and an amateur cricketer. Denne was born at Thames Ditton in Surrey in 1831 and died at Barnwood in Gloucestershire in 1898 aged 67.

Denne joined the Royal Horse Artillery in 1848 and served in the Crimean War, including the siege and fall of Sevastopol. He was promoted to lieutenant-colonel in 1874 and full colonel in 1879, retiring with the honorary rank of major-general in 1881.

Denne played first-class cricket between 1850 and 1863 as an amateur. He made his first first-class appearance for the Gentlemen of Kent and went on to play for the Marylebone Cricket Club and for Kent County Cricket Club, making a total of 12 appearances in first-class matches. Denne served on the Kent committee for a number of years and was President of the club in 1895.

Denne's father David played first-class cricket for Kent before the first county club was formed in 1842, and an uncle Thomas Denne appeared for Oxford University and other amateur teams in the 1820s and 1830s.

== Bibliography ==
- Carlaw, Derek (2020). Kent County Cricketers, A to Z: Part One (1806–1914) (PDF). Cardiff: ACS.
