= Alfred Baillie =

Scottish cricketer, cricket administrator and barrister

Personal information
- Full name: Alfred William Baillie
- Born: 22 June 1830; Marylebone, Middlesex, England
- Died: 10 May 1867 (aged 36); Regent's Park, London, England
- Batting: Unknown
- Relatives: Duncan Baillie (brother)

Domestic team information
- Years: Team
- 1850–1857: Marylebone Cricket Club

Career statistics
Competition	First-class
Matches	6
Runs scored	8
Batting average	1.00
100s/50s	–/–
Top score	5
Catches/stumpings	–/–
- Source: Cricinfo, 15 May 2021

Alfred William Baillie (22 June 1830 – 10 May 1867) was a Scottish first-class cricketer and barrister who served as secretary of the Marylebone Cricket Club.

The son of the Scot Colonel Hugh Duncan Baillie of Redcastle, he was born at Marylebone in June 1830. He was educated at Eton College, before going up to Trinity College, Cambridge. He was a member of the Cambridge University Cricket Club while studying at Trinity, but did not represent the club in first-class cricket. He did however play first-class cricket for the Marylebone Cricket Club (MCC) on six occasions between 1850 and 1857, though with little success, with Baillie scoring just 8 runs in these matches. A member of the Inner Temple, he was called to the bar to practice as a barrister in 1859. Baillie's association with the MCC went beyond playing, with him serving as the club secretary from 1858 to 1863, when ill health necessitated his resignation. He was succeeded by Robert Allan Fitzgerald. Baillie died at Regent's Park in May 1867. His brother, Duncan, also played first-class cricket.
