= Thomas Nixon (cricketer, born 1815) =

English cricketer and inventor

Thomas Nixon (1815–1877) was an English professional cricketer and inventor. In addition to being one of the leading slow lob bowlers of the 1850s, he was responsible for important advances in the development of cricketing equipment; notably cane-handled bats and open-cane batting pads. He also patented an early mechanical bowling machine.

== Cricket career ==
Nixon was born on 4 June 1815 in Nottingham. He was originally a lace maker by profession and he did not make his debut for Nottinghamshire until 1841. He continued to play sporadically for the county but his career only really blossomed when he joined the MCC staff at Lord's in 1851, taking 9 wickets in an innings and 14 in the match for MCC against Middlesex in his debut season. Over the next decade he established himself as one of the leading slow bowlers in the Country and represented the All England Eleven, the Players and played in the important annual North versus the South matches. He also played in other first-class matches for the Slow Bowlers against the Fast Bowlers and for the Over Thirties against the Under Thirties.

Described as a lob bowler with 'much twist' he took 264 wickets in 54 first-class matches at an average of 9.98. Nixon was a right-handed batsman who scored 338 runs at an average of 4.84. Despite this unimpressive record he played as an opening batsman on several occasions. His highest first-class score was 34 for MCC against the All England Eleven.

His first-class career ended in the late 1850s and in 1861 he moved to Oxford and then to Cheshire. He continued to play in non-first class matches, and throughout his career played as a guest professional for numerous sides. One of his most remarkable performances was for a XXII of Herefordshire against the All England Eleven in 1851; he returned figures of 74.3–43–44–6 as England were bowled out for 130, the XXII of Herefordshire still lost by an innings. He also frequently umpired at Lord's.

== Cricket inventions ==
Nixon's innovations can be seen as a response to the increase in fast-bowling in Cricket from the 1840s. He experimented with cork batting pads before introducing Malayan malacca and cane rattan open pads in 1853. He also used the strength and flexibility of cane in bat design. His cane-handled bat helped to absorb the shock imparted to the batsman by the fast round-arm bowlers of the day. Nixon also took out a patent on his 'Balista' bowling machine in 1862. This contraption was designed as an improvement on the 'Catapult' machine in being able to replicate round-arm bowling. The ball was propelled by a vulcanised rubber sling which could be modified to provide variations in the speed and length of delivery. By 1864 the Balista was being demonstrated in Australia where local reporters attested to the ingenuity of the machine.

== Family life ==
Nixon had two cricketing sons; Thomas Henry Nixon was also on the MCC Staff, and Reuben Nixon represented the Gentlemen of Cheshire and the Gentlemen of Shropshire. Thomas Henry Nixon's son, Harry Nixon also played for Scotland. Thomas Nixon died on 20 July 1877 at Chelford, Cheshire.
