= George Wells (cricketer) =

English cricketer

George Wells (2 November 1830 in Whitechapel, London – 23 January 1891) was an English cricketer. His son, Frederick, also played first-class cricket.
