= Charles Hope (cricketer) =

English cricketer and merchant

Personal information
- Full name: Charles Southern Hope
- Born: 9 November 1837; England
- Died: 18 March 1916 (aged 78); Kensington, London, England
- Batting: Unknown
- Bowling: Unknown

Domestic team information
- Years: Team
- 1858–1859: Marylebone Cricket Club

Career statistics
Competition	First-class
Matches	4
Runs scored	26
Batting average	5.20
100s/50s	–/–
Top score	9
Balls bowled	8
Wickets	1
Bowling average	?
5 wickets in innings	–
10 wickets in match	–
Best bowling	1/?
Catches/stumpings	2/–
- Source: Cricinfo, 7 October 2021

Charles Southern Hope (9 November 1837 — 18 March 1916) was an English first-class cricketer and tea broker.

The son of Charles Hope, he was born in November 1837. He was educated at Winchester College, where he described by Wisden as "one of the best players in the [cricket] eleven". He played first-class cricket for the Marylebone Cricket Club on four occasions in 1858 and 1859, making three appearances against Cambridge University and one appearance against Oxford University. He scored 26 runs in these matches, in addition to taking a single wicket. By profession, Hope was a tea broker in China and Japan from 1859 to 1867. He died at Kensington in March 1916.
