= Skynner Woodruffe =

English cricketer and British Army officer

Personal information
- Full name: Skynner George Woodruffe
- Born: 6 June 1814; Chiswick, Middlesex, England
- Died: 4 February 1848 (aged 33); Brackley, Northamptonshire, England
- Batting: Unknown

Domestic team information
- Years: Team
- 1836–1837: Marylebone Cricket Club

Career statistics
Competition	First-class
Matches	2
Runs scored	6
Batting average	3.00
100s/50s	–/–
Top score	4*
Catches/stumpings	–/–
- Source: Cricinfo, 23 September 2021

Skynner George Woodruffe (6 June 1814 – 4 February 1848) was an English first-class cricketer.

The son of George Woodruffe, he was born at Chiswick in June 1814. Woodruffe made two appearances in first-class cricket for the Marylebone Cricket Club, with both coming against Cambridge University at Cambridge in 1836 and 1837. He scored 6 runs in these two matches, with a highest score of 4 not out. He was commissioned into the Queen's Own Worcestershire Hussars as a lieutenant in June 1841. Woodruffe died in February 1848 at Farthinghoe Lodge in the Northamptonshire village of Farthinghoe.
