= Frederick Wells (cricketer, born 1796) =

English cricketer

Personal information
- Full name: Frederick Wells
- Born: 1 July 1796; Dorking, Surrey, England
- Died: 27 January 1849 (aged 52); Brighton, Sussex, England
- Batting: Right-handed
- Bowling: Right-arm underarm medium

Domestic team information
- Years: Team
- 1839: Sussex
- 1832–1838: Sussex
- 1830: Marylebone Cricket Club
- 1828: Surrey

Career statistics
Competition	First-class
Matches	29
Runs scored	407
Batting average	7.40
100s/50s	–/1
Top score	67
Balls bowled	?
Wickets	1
Bowling average	?
5 wickets in innings	–
10 wickets in match	–
Best bowling	1/?
Catches/stumpings	8/–
- Source: CricketArchive, 21 January 2013

Frederick Wells (1 July 1796 – 27 January 1849) was an English cricketer. Wells was a right-handed batsman who bowled right-arm underarm medium. He was born at Dorking, Surrey.

Wells made his first-class debut for Surrey against Kent at Sevenoaks Vine in 1828. The following season he made a single first-class appearance for England against Sussex, before making a single first-class appearance each the following season for the Gentlemen of Kent against the Marylebone Cricket Club and for the Marylebone Cricket Club against Suffolk. He made his debut for Sussex (Note: Sussex County Cricket Club did not exist until 1839, however other sides represented and played under the banner of Sussex prior to that date.) against England in 1832. His next six appearances to 1834 for Sussex were in Sussex v England fixtures. He made his only first-class appearances for the Players in the Gentlemen v Players fixture of 1834. Wells went on to make a further thirteen first-class appearances for Sussex to 1838. In March 1839, Sussex County Cricket Club was formally created with Wells playing in the club's inaugural first-class fixture against the Marylebone Cricket Club at Lord's. He made three further first-class appearances for the club in 1839, the last of which came against the Marylebone Cricket Club at the Royal New Ground, Brighton. Wells played 24 matches for Sussex (twenty prior to the formation of the County Cricket Club and four for the County Cricket Club), scoring a total of 285 runs for the county at an average of 6.19, with a high score of 32. His highest first-class score of 67 came for the Gentlemen of Kent.

He died at Brighton, Sussex on 27 January 1849.
