= James Tabor (cricketer) =

English cricketer and barrister

Personal information
- Full name: James Albert Clement Tabor
- Born: 11 February 1840; Prittlewell, Essex, England
- Died: 14 February 1880 (aged 40); Great Baddow, Essex, England
- Batting: Unknown

Domestic team information
- Years: Team
- 1863: Marylebone Cricket Club

Career statistics
Competition	First-class
Matches	1
Runs scored	2
Batting average	–
100s/50s	–/–
Top score	2*
Catches/stumpings	–/–
- Source: Cricinfo, 9 October 2021

James Albert Clement Tabor JP (11 February 1840 – 14 February 1880) was an English first-class cricketer and barrister.

The son of James Tabor, he was born in February 1840 at Prittlewell, Essex. He was educated at Eton College, before matriculating at Trinity College, Cambridge in 1857.

Tabor played first-class cricket for the Marylebone Cricket Club (MCC) against Cambridge University at Fenner's in 1863. He batted once in the match, ending the MCC's first innings unbeaten on 2 runs. A student of the Inner Temple, he was called to the bar in January 1865. He was also a justice of the peace for Essex. Tabor died unexpectedly on 14 February 1880 at Great Baddow, Essex.
