= Will Martingell =

English cricketer

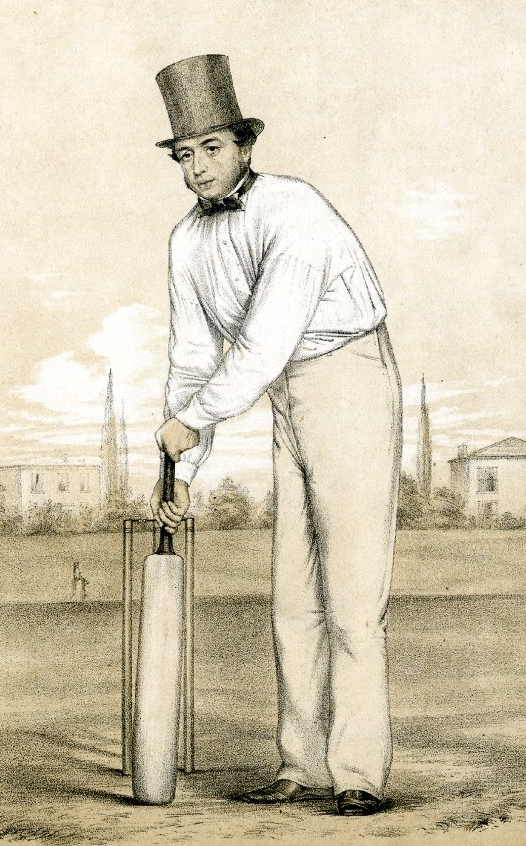
- An illustration of Martingell from about 1850

Personal information
- Full name: William Martingell
- Born: 20 August 1818; Nutfield, Surrey
- Died: 29 September 1897 (aged 79); Eton Wick, Buckinghamshire
- Nickname: Grannie
- Height: 5 ft 10.5 in (1.79 m)
- Batting: Right-handed
- Bowling: Right-arm medium
- Relatives: Russell Martingell (father)

Domestic team information
- Years: Team
- 1841–1852: Kent
- 1846–1859: Surrey

William Martingell (20 August 1818 – 29 September 1897), also known as Will Martingell, was an English professional cricketer who played between 1839 and 1860. He played primarily for Kent County Cricket Club and Surrey County Cricket Club, making over 180 appearances during his career.

== Early life ==
Martingell was born at Nutfield in Surrey in 1818, the eldest child of Russell Martingell and his wife Sarah. His father was a shoemaker who played one match for Surrey in 1828 and who had a reputation as a good fast underarm bowler. Martingell learned the trade of shoemaking from his father and also worked as a gamekeeper.

== Cricket career ==
Martingell is first recorded as a cricketer in July 1839, playing for Lingfield Cricket Club against Montpelier Cricket Club in a match at Dormansland. A report in the Sussex Agricultural Express called his bowling "splendid" and reported that he was a "most promising" cricketer who was due to be employed at the Marylebone Cricket Club (MCC). He made his cricket debut later the same month playing for Surrey against MCC at Lord's, taking five wickets in the MCC second innings as they were dismissed for 15 runs.

After being unable to find sponsorship to play as a professional at MCC or in Surrey, Martingell moved to Kent in 1841 and was "engaged" working under Fuller Pilch at Canterbury. Pilch, who was one of the leading cricketers of the time, had managed the Old County Ground at Town Malling before moving to do the same at the Beverley Ground at Canterbury. Under Pilch's tuition Martingell quickly became established as one of the best professionals playing at the time and played for Kent, both before and after the formation of the first county club in 1842, and in matches at Lord's for several teams. In 1844 he was employed by the Earl of Ducie at Woodchester Park in Gloucestershire and played for West of England teams four times in two years.

In 1846 Martingell was one of the first two professionals to be employed by the newly formed Surrey County Cricket Club at The Oval, Dulcie having sold his property in Gloucestershire. He played for both Kent and Surrey until 1852 and, as a professional, played for MCC, England, the All England Eleven, and in 12 Gentlemen v Players matches between 1844 and 1858. He made his last appearance for Kent in 1854 and for Surrey in 1859, with his final matches in 1860 being played for MCC.

In total Martingell played in 182 matches, 49 of which were for Kent and 49 for Surrey. He was one of the best professional players of his era, with both his batting and bowling said to "rank high", although his bowling was his greater strength. The Sporting Review of 1846 described him as "a most excellent player, and a thoroughly well-conducted man". He was a "fine judge of the game" and held many coaching appointments, including at Bradfield College, Rugby School and Eton College. A benefit match held for him at The Oval in 1860 raised over £260.

== Personal life ==
Martingell married Caroline Evans at Monks Kirby in Warwickshire in 1850. He was known by the nickname "Grannie" and died at Eton Wick in Buckinghamshire in September 1897 aged 79.

== Bibliography ==
- Birley, Derek (1999). A Social History of English Cricket. London: Aurum Press. ISBN 978-18-54107-10-7 – via Internet Archive.
- Carlaw, Derek (2020). Kent County Cricketers, A to Z: Part One (1806–1914) (PDF). Cardiff: ACS.
