= List of Gentlemen of Kent cricketers =

This is a list of cricketers who played for the Gentlemen of Kent in historically important or first-class matches. The team played 49 in total, including 48 between 1830 and 1880, with one match under the same name in 1791.

The team was typically made up of amateur players only, generally those associated with Kent (pre-1843) and/or Kent County Cricket Club. It played most frequently against Marylebone Cricket Club (MCC) and the Gentlemen of England. An annual fixture took place during the Canterbury Cricket Week between 1842 and 1866 (the fixture did not take place between 1855 and 1857). Two matches played during the Week in 1879 and 1880 were first-class. The team played other matches, including an annual one-day fixture against I Zingari, during Canterbury Week.

This list includes only those players who appeared in the important or first-class fixtures. Note that many players represented other teams besides the Gentlemen of Kent.

Note: Where a player's name is preceded by a † symbol, the article is a redirect to this list.

== A ==
- Charlie Absolom
- Tom Adams
- Montague Ainslie
- Josiah Alexander
- Josceline Amherst
- Stephen Amherst (1791)
- Henry Andrews
- Audley Archdall
- Geoffrey Austin
- James Aylward (1791)

== B ==
- William de Chair Baker
- William Baldock
- † Delamark Banks (1854)
- Edward Banks
- William Banks
- Henry Barber
- † J. B. Barker (1862)
- † George Corbett Barnes (1866)
- William Barnett
- Emilius Bayley
- Lyttleton Bayley
- Henry Berens
- Richard Berens
- Henry Biron
- Arthur Blackman
- Edward Bligh (1791)
- Edward Vesey Bligh
- Henry Bligh
- Ivo Bligh
- Frederick Bosworth
- Thomas Brenchley
- William Browning (1791)
- William Bruce
- William Bullen (1791)
- George Burnett
- Stephen Butcher (1791)

== C ==
- Arthur Ceely
- Charles Clayton
- Louis Cockerell
- Edward Colebrooke
- Thomas Crowhurst
- Charles Cumberland (1791)
- Charles Cunliffe
- Fendall Currie

== D ==
- George Dallas
- John Bligh, 4th Earl of Darnley (1791)
- John Bligh, 6th Earl of Darnley
- James Davis
- John Davison
- William Deacon
- William Deedes
- Robert de Lasaux
- Lambert Denne
- George Dickins
- Frederick Dyer
- James Dyer
- William Dyer
- Percyvall Dyke
- William Hart Dyke

== E ==
- Herbert Edlmann
- James Edmeades

== F ==
- Frederick Fagge
- Nicholas Felix
- Joseph Finch Fenn
- Samuel Fenn
- William Fenn
- William Foord-Kelcey
- Harry Fryer

== G ==
- Frederick Gale
- Gloucester Gambier
- Augustus George
- Alfred Gillow
- † William Gillow (1846)
- Billy Goodhew

== H ==
- William Hammersley
- Archibald Harenc
- Charles Harenc
- Edward Harenc
- † Henry Harenc (Note: Henry Harenc was the brother of Archibald, Charles and Edward Harenc. Played his only first-class match in 1832. Known to have played once for Harrow School in 1826 against Westminster School at Lord's, his only other known cricket match. He graduated from Christ Church, Oxford in 1832, was called to the bar at the Inner Temple, and later served as one of the Excise Commissioners for Ireland.)
- Lord Harris
- Thomas Harris
- Edward Hartnell
- Algernon Haskett-Smith
- Edward Hemsted
- William Hillyer
- Philip Hilton
- William Hoare
- George Hodgson
- Richard Hosmer (1791)

== I ==
- John Inge

== J ==
- † Charles Jackson (1865)
- † George Jackson (1844)
- Charles Jenner
- Henry Jenner
- Herbert Jenner
- William Jervis
- Richard Jones

== K ==
- Robert William Keate
- George Kelson
- Manley Kemp
- † James Kirkpatrick (1838)
- Henry Knatchbull
- William Knatchbull-Hugessen
- Brook Knight
- George Knight
- Philip Knight

== L ==
- † Matthias Lancaster (1850)
- Bob Lipscomb
- Alfred Lubbock
- Edgar Lubbock
- Nevile Lubbock

== M ==
- Francis MacKinnon
- Ward Maule
- Henry Mayne
- George Milles
- Richard Mills
- † John Minter (1843)
- Walter Money
- Harry Moody
- Pierrepont Mundy
- Henry Munn
- Herbert Harley Murray
- Alfred Mynn
- Walter Mynn

== N ==
- Charles Norman
- Frederick Norman
- George Warde Norman
- Henry Norman
- Philip Norman
- William South Norton

== O ==
- Christopher Oldfield
- Charles Oxenden

== P ==
- Henry Parker
- Percival Parr
- William Patterson
- Walter Pattisson
- Herbert Richard Peel
- Dick Penn
- Frank Penn
- Henry Pepys
- John Pepys
- Fuller Pilch
- Alexander Pitcairn (1791)
- Charles Pontifex
- Francis Popham

== R ==
- Cyril Randolph
- † Charles Rashleigh (1847)
- William Boys Rashleigh
- Henry Reade
- James Robertson
- William Rodger
- Henry Rogers

== S ==
- Thomas Sanders
- † Alfred Scott (1844)
- Lothian Scott
- Stephen Smith
- Henry Snow
- Joseph Spencer
- Lord Strathavon
- Richard Streatfeild
- Edward Swann

== T ==
- Edward Taswell
- Robert Tayler
- Robert Terry
- Sackville Tufton, 9th Earl of Thanet (1791)
- Richard Thomas
- Charles Thornton
- James Traill
- William Traill
- Medhurst Troughton
- Carleton Tufnell

== W ==
- Edmund Waller
- William Walton
- Arthur Wathen
- William Wathen
- James Watts
- † William Weatherley (1832)
- Frederick Wells
- Ned Wenman
- Charles Whittaker
- † Whomes (1830)
- Edmund Willes
- Charles Willis
- Tom Wills
- Edgar Willsher
- † S. Wood (1844–1845)

== See also ==
- List of Kent County Cricket Club players
- List of Kent county cricketers to 1842

== Bibliography ==
- ACS (1982). A Guide to First-class Cricket Matches Played in the British Isles. Nottingham: ACS. OCLC 10586869.
- Carlaw, Derek (2020). Kent County Cricketers, A to Z: Part One (1806–1914) (PDF). Cardiff: ACS.
- Moore, Dudley (1998). The History of Kent County Cricket Club. London: Christopher Helm. ISBN 978-07-47022-09-1.
- Rice, Jonathan (2019). Stories of Cricket's Finest Painting. Worthing: Pitch Publishing. ISBN 978-17-85315-05-3.
