= Fellows (surname) =

Fellows is a surname. Notable people with the surname include:

- Archie Fellows, English footballer
- Brandon Fellows (born 1994 or 1995), English actor
- Charles Fellows (disambiguation)
- Charlie Fellows (disambiguation)
- Christine Fellows (born 1968), Canadian folk-pop singer-songwriter
- Deborah Copenhaver Fellows, American sculptor
- Dexter Fellows (1871–1937), American circus press agent
- Don Fellows (1922–2007), American actor
- Duncan Fellows, Australian actor, plays Rex in the 2025 miniseries Reckless
- Edwin R. Fellows (1865–1945), founder of the Fellows Gear Shaper Company
- Frank Fellows (basketball), American basketball coach
- Frank Fellows (politician) (1889–1951), U.S. Representative from Maine
- Gary Fellows (born 1978), English cricketer
- Graham Fellows (born 1959), English comic actor
- Grant Fellows (1865–1929), American jurist
- Harvey Fellows (1826–1907), English cricketer
- Jonathan Fellows-Smith (1932–2013), former South African cricketer
- John R. Fellows (1832–1896), U.S. Representative from New York
- Michael Fellows (born 1952), American academic
- Mike Fellows (musician) (born 1965), American musician
- Robert Fellows (1903–1969), American film producer
- Ron Fellows (born 1959), Canadian racing driver
- Sam Fellows (born 1993), Canadian racing driver
- Scott Fellows (born 1965), American television writer and producer
- Stephen Fellows, English songwriter
- Stewart Fellows (born 1948), English professional footballer
- Walter Fellows (1834–1901), English cricketer
- Warren Fellows (born 1952), Australian convicted of drug trafficking in 1981

== See also ==
- Fellowes
