= Harenc =

Harenc is a surname. Notable people of surname include

- Archibald Harenc (1821–1884), English cricketer
- Charles Harenc (1811–1877), English cricketer
- Edward Harenc (1814–1853), English clergyman and cricketer
- Geoffroy Harenc, abbot of Bec Abbey

== See also ==
- Orgueilleuse of Harenc, first wife of Bohemond III of Antioch
