= Herbert Jenner-Fust (cricketer) =

English cricketer

Personal information
- Nationality: English
- Born: 14 August 1841 Beckenham, Kent
- Died: 11 November 1940 (aged 99) Falfield, Gloucestershire

Sport
- Sport: Cricket
- Club: Gloucestershire County

Herbert Jenner-Fust (14 August 1841 – 11 November 1940) was an English cricketer who played for Gloucestershire County Cricket Club.

== Career ==
Jenner-Fust made a single first-class appearance for the side, during the 1875 season, against Yorkshire. From the tailend, he scored a single run in the first innings in which he batted, and a duck in the second.

== Personal life ==
Amongst Jenner-Fust's cricket-playing relatives were his brothers-in-law John Dyke, Percyvall Dyke and Thomas Dyke, his cousin Edwin Dyke, his father Herbert Jenner, his nephew Evan Nepean and his uncles Charles Jenner and Henry Lascelles Jenner.
