= William Dyer =

William Dyer may refer to:

- William Dyer (settler) (1609 – c. 1677), early settler of the Colony of Rhode Island and Providence Plantations
- William Dyer (divine) (d. 1696), English nonconformist divine
- William Dyer (cricketer) (1805–1865), English cricketer of the 1830s
- William Dyer (footballer), English footballer
- William John Dyer (1830–1909), New Zealand businessman and politician
- William Dyer, a fictional character, the narrator of H. P. Lovecraft's novella At the Mountains of Madness
- William J. Dyer (1881–1933), American actor
- William A. Dyer (1903–1993), American journalist
- Bill Dyer (Australian footballer) (1917–1957), Australian rules footballer
- William G. Dyer (1925–1997), American educator
- Willie Dyer (born 1987), Scottish footballer
- William Dyer (died 1681), 1st Dyer baronet of Tottenham from 1678 to 1681
- Bill Dyer (fl. 1937–38), American broadcaster at two Major League Baseball All-Star Games

== See also ==
- Dyer (surname)
