= Joe Spencer =

Joe or Joseph Spencer may refer to:

- Joe Spencer (American football) (1923–1996), American football player
- Joe Spencer (baseball) (1919–2003), American Negro league baseball player
- Joseph Spencer (1714–1789), Connecticut lawyer, soldier, and politician
- Joseph Spencer (New York politician) (1790–1823), New York lawyer and politician
- Joseph Spencer (cricketer), English cricketer, British Army soldier and inventor
- Joe Spencer (Hollyoaks), a character in the British soap opera Hollyoaks

== Other uses ==
- Joseph Spence (disambiguation)
