= Harry Moody =

Harry Moody may refer to:

- Harry Moody (footballer), English footballer
- Harry Moody (civil servant), English cricketer and civil servant

== See also ==
- Harold Moody, British civil rights activist
- Harold Moody (athlete), British shot putter
- Henry Moody (disambiguation)
