= Charles Oxenden (cricketer, born 1826) =

English cricketer and soldier

Personal information
- Full name: Charles Vernon Oxenden
- Born: 31 October 1826; England
- Died: 26 April 1868 (aged 41); Barham, Kent, England
- Batting: Unknown
- Bowling: Unknown
- Relatives: Charles Oxenden (father)

Career statistics
Competition	First-class
Matches	9
Runs scored	149
Batting average	11.46
100s/50s	–/–
Top score	39*
Balls bowled	?
Wickets	1
Bowling average	?
5 wickets in innings	–
10 wickets in match	–
Best bowling	1/?
Catches/stumpings	9/–
- Source: Cricinfo, 28 March 2020

Charles Vernon Oxenden (31 October 1826 – 26 April 1868) was an English first-class cricketer and British Army officer.

The son of Charles Oxenden senior, he was born in October 1826. He made his debut in first-class cricket for the Gentlemen of Kent against the Gentlemen of England at Canterbury in 1844. In August of the same year purchased a commission as a second lieutenant in the Rifle Brigade, before purchasing the rank of first lieutenant in July 1847. He played first-class cricket regularly throughout the 1850s, making eight further first-class appearances; six for the Gentlemen of Kent and two for the Gentlemen of Kent and Sussex. In nine first-class matches, he scored 149 runs at an average of 11.46 and a high score of 39 not out. In June 1854, he was promoted without purchase to captain, before purchasing the rank of major in September 1857. He was promoted to lieutenant colonel in April 1859. Oxenden died in April 1868 at Barham, Kent.
