= Frederick Dyer =

Frederick Dyer may refer to:

- Frederick Dyer (cricketer), English cricketer and medical doctor
- Frederick H. Dyer, Union Army drummer boy, later author

== See also ==
- Fred Dyer, Welsh boxer, boxing manager and baritone singer
