= Samuel Fenn =

English cricketer

Personal information
- Full name: Samuel Fenn
- Born: 5 June 1829; Blackheath, Kent, England
- Died: 5 October 1868 (aged 39); Calcutta, Bengal Presidency, British India
- Batting: Unknown
- Relatives: William Fenn (brother)

Domestic team information
- Years: Team
- 1851: Cambridge University

Career statistics
Competition	First-class
Matches	3
Runs scored	56
Batting average	14.00
100s/50s	–/–
Top score	25
Catches/stumpings	3/–
- Source: Cricinfo, 17 July 2020

Samuel Fenn (5 June 1829 – 25 October 1868) was an English first-class cricketer.

The son of the Reverend Joseph Fenn, the minister of Blackheath Park Chapel, he was born at Blackheath in June 1829. He was educated at Blackheath Proprietary School before going up to Trinity College, Cambridge. While studying at Cambridge, he made two appearances in first-class cricket for Cambridge University in 1851, playing against the Marylebone Cricket Club and Oxford University in The University Match. He graduated from Cambridge in 1852, and in that same year he featured in a first-class match for the Gentlemen of Kent against the Gentlemen of England at Lord's. His total first-class career yielded him 56 runs with a high score of 25. Fenn died at Calcutta in British India in October 1868. His brothers Joseph and William were both Church of England clergy and first-class cricketers.
