= Alfred Payne =

Alfred Payne may refer to:

- Alfred Payne (cricketer, born 1831) (1831–1874), English amateur cricketer mainly associated with Oxford University and MCC
- Alfred Payne (Sussex cricketer) (1858–1943), English cricketer, played for Sussex 1880–86
- Alfred Payne (cricketer, born 1849) (1849–1927), English cricketer
