= Alexander Rossi (artist) =

British painter

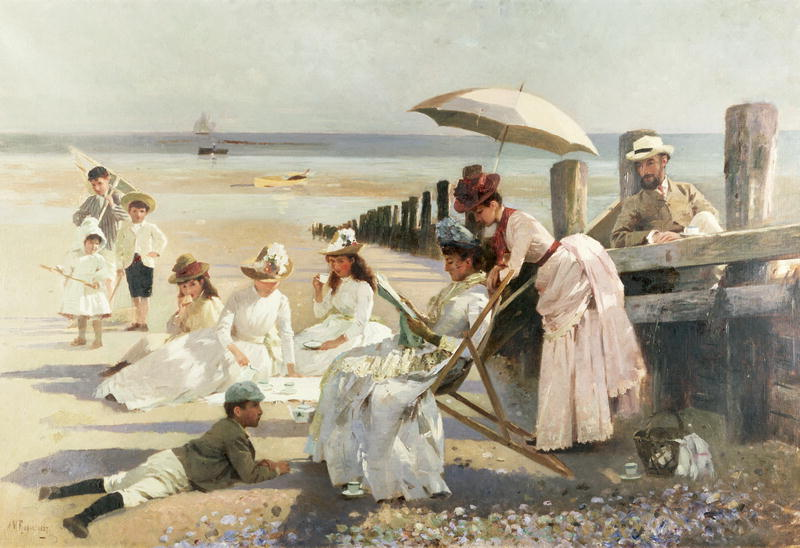
On the shores of Bognor Regis (Oil on canvas, 1887)

Alexander Mark Rossi (1840 – 9 January 1916) was a successful British artist specializing in genre works who flourished in the late 19th century.

== Biography ==
He was born on the Greek Island of Corfu, the son of Dr Mark Rossi, an Italian who was one of the three judges presiding over the Ionian Islands during the time of British rule. On a visit to Preston, England, in 1866, Rossi met and later married Jane Gillow. He remained in the United Kingdom thereafter. In the 1870s, he moved to London.

Between 1871 and 1903, Rossi exhibited 66 works at the Royal Academy and was also a member of the Hogarth Club. Many of his paintings were of children and young adults, the models often being members of his own family. Perhaps his most well-known painting is Forbidden Books (1897).

After his first wife's death, he married Silvia Tassart in 1902. He died in Golders Green, London, on 9 January 1916.

Note: Some British art houses mistakenly give Rossi's birth and death dates as 1870-1903, but these actually refer to the dates that he was active on the London art scene.
