= Edwin Dyke =

English clergyman and cricketer

Edwin Francis Dyke (27 September 1842 – 26 August 1919) was an English clergyman and cricketer who played first-class cricket for Cambridge University in 1864 and 1865 and for Marylebone Cricket Club in 1866. He was born in London and died at Maidstone, Kent.

As a cricketer, Dyke was a right-handed lower-order batsman and a left-arm medium pace bowler. It was as a bowler that he made an immediate impression in his only first-class match of 1864: he took 10 Marylebone Cricket Club wickets for 41 runs in the game, including 6 for 14 in the second innings. He was unable to repeat this success in four first-class games for Cambridge in 1865: these included the University match against Oxford University in which he took a single wicket and failed to score in either innings. His single game for MCC in 1866 was his most successful with the bat, with a score of 46 in the second innings.

== Family and career ==
Dyke came from a cricketing family: his uncle was Herbert Jenner who captained Cambridge in the first official University match, and the long-lived Herbert Jenner-Fust was a cousin, as was Charles Nepean. He was educated at Eton College and Trinity Hall, Cambridge.

After graduation, Dyke was ordained in the Church of England; he was a curate at Crayford and West Wickham and then vicar at Orpington before moving to Maidstone from 1883 to 1896. From 1896 to 1916 he was rector of Mersham in Kent and he was an honorary canon of Canterbury Cathedral from 1892 to his death in 1919.
