= William Fenn =

William Fenn may refer to:

- William Fenn junior (1904–1980), American cyclist
- William Fenn senior (1880–?), American cyclist
- William Fenn (cricketer) (1828–1886), English cricketer and clergyman
- William Wallace Fenn (1862–1932), Unitarian minister and dean of Harvard Divinity School
