= Charles Jenner =

Charles Jenner may refer to:

- Charles Jenner (cricketer) (1809–1891), English Anglican cleric and cricketer
- Charles Jenner (writer) (1736–1774), English poet and novelist
- Charles Jenner (businessman) (1810–1893), founder of the Scottish department store Jenners
