= Frederick Bosworth =

English cricketer (1825–1867)

Personal information
- Full name: Frederick William Bosworth
- Born: 30 October 1825; Westerham, Kent, England
- Died: 22 February 1867 (aged 41); Pau, Basses-Pyrénées, France
- Batting: Unknown

Career statistics
Competition	First-class
Matches	1
Runs scored	2
Batting average	1.00
100s/50s	–/–
Top score	2
Catches/stumpings	1/–
- Source: Cricinfo, 19 July 2020

Frederick William Bosworth (30 October 1825 – 22 February 1867) was an English first-class cricketer and barrister.

The son of Thomas Holmes Bosworth, he was born in October 1825 at Westerham, Kent. He was educated at Charterhouse School, before matriculating to Christ Church, Oxford. However, Bosworth did not gain his bachelor's degree from Christ Church, instead graduating from Merton College, Oxford in 1849. In the year of his graduation, he made a single appearance in first-class cricket for the Gentlemen of Kent against the Gentlemen of England at Canterbury in 1849. Batting twice in the match, he was dismissed for 2 runs in the Gentlemen of Kent first innings by Sir Frederick Hervey-Bathurst, while in their second innings he was dismissed without scoring by Harvey Fellows.

A member of Lincoln's Inn from 1850, he completed his master's degree at Wadham College, Oxford in 1853 and in the same year he was called to the bar. Bosworth died in France at Pau in February 1867.
