= George Burnett =

George Burnett may refer to:

- George Burnett (writer) (1776?–1811), English nonconformist minister, known as a writer
- George Burnett (officer of arms) (1822–1890), Lord Lyon King of Arms
- George Burnett (cricketer) (1824–1915), English cricketer and distiller
- George H. Burnett (1853–1927), Oregon Supreme Court Chief Justice
- George Ritter Burnett (1858–1908), United States Army officer and Medal of Honor recipient
- George Burnett (footballer) (1920–1985), English footballer for Everton and Oldham Athletic, see List of Oldham Athletic A.F.C. players
- George Murray Burnett (1921–1980), mathematician and chemist
- George Burnett (ice hockey) (born 1962), National Hockey League coach

== See also ==
- George Burnett Barton (1836–1901), Australian lawyer
- George Barnett (disambiguation)
