= Henry Rogers =

Henry Rogers may refer to:

- Henry Darwin Rogers (1808–1866), American geologist
- Henry Huttleston Rogers (1840–1909), American leader of Standard Oil; philanthropist
- Henry Wade Rogers (1853–1926), American law dean and federal judge
- Henry James Rogers, paper industry executive and owner of the world's first electric house Hearthstone Historic House Museum
- Henry Rogers (priest) (1583/4–1658), priest from Herefordshire, England
- Henry Rogers (congregationalist) (1806–1877), English nonconformist minister and man of letters, known as a Christian apologist
- Henry Rogers (drummer) (born 1991), English drummer
- Henry C. Rogers (1914–1995), American publicist
- Henry Rogers (cricketer) (1840–1915), English cricketer and officer in the Indian Civil Service
- Henry Warren Rogers (1831–1915), American architect
- Ibram X. Kendi (born 1982 as Henry Rogers), American author and professor

== See also ==
- Harry Rogers (disambiguation)
