= William Rashleigh =

William Rashleigh may refer to:

- William Rashleigh (MP for Fowey) (1777–1855), MP for Fowey 1812–18, Sheriff of Cornwall in 1818
- William Rashleigh (1817–1871), English Conservative Party politician, MP for East Cornwall 1841–47
- William Rashleigh (cricketer) (1867–1937), English cricketer who played first class cricket for Kent and Oxford University between 1885 and 1901
