= Robert Tayler =

Robert Tayler may refer to:

- Robert Walker Tayler (1852–1910), U.S. Representative from Ohio and judge
- Robert Walker Tayler Sr. (1812–1878), member of the Ohio Senate
- Robert Tayler (cricketer) (1836–1888), English cricketer

== See also ==
- Robert Taylour (died 1745), Anglican priest in Ireland
