= James Dyer (disambiguation) =

James Dyer (1510–1582) was a judge and Speaker of the House of Commons.

James Dyer may also refer to:

- James E. Dyer (1946–2011), American politician
- James Dyer (cricketer) (1809–1876), English cricketer
- Jimmy Dyer (1883–1971), footballer
- Jim Dyer, member of the Colorado Senate from the 26th district, followed by Steve Ward
- James Dyer, a character in Londyńczycy

== See also ==
- John James Dyer (1809–1855), United States federal judge in Iowa
