= George Barnett (disambiguation) =

George Barnett (1859–1930) was 12th Commandant of the United States Marine Corps

George Barnett may also refer to:

- George E. Barnett (1873–1938), American economist
- George Ezra (George Ezra Barnett, born 1993), British singer-songwriter
- George Barnett (musician born 1988), English drummer for These New Puritans and model
- George I. Barnett (1815–1898), American architect
- George Vern Barnett (1891–1946), Australian organist, choir master and accompanist
- George Barnett (historian) (1876–1965), Irish historian, archaeologist, botanist, geologist, folklorist and poet

== See also ==
- George Burnett (disambiguation)
