= William Wathen =

English cricketer

Personal information
- Full name: William Hulbert Wathen
- Born: 5 May 1836; Streatham, Surrey
- Died: 29 March 1913 (aged 76); Westerham, Kent
- Batting: Right-handed
- Bowling: Right-arm slow
- Role: Bowler
- Relatives: Arthur Wathen (brother); Philip Bonham-Carter (grandson)

Career statistics
Competition	First-class
Matches	6
Runs scored	139
Batting average	12.63
100s/50s	0/0
Top score	38
Balls bowled	144
Wickets	7
Bowling average	14.28
5 wickets in innings	0
10 wickets in match	0
Best bowling	2/16
Catches/stumpings	0/–
- Source: CricInfo, 14 August 2020

William Hulbert Wathen (5 May 1836 – 29 March 1913) was an English businessman and amateur cricketer who played during the 1860s.

Wathen was born at Streatham, then in Surrey, in 1836, the son of Hulbert and Harriet Louisa Wathen (née Blunt). His father was a tea merchant in London and was the Master of the Worshipful Company of Mercers in 1850. Wathen was educated at Brighton College, Rugby School and Blackheath Proprietary School.

The family lived at Beckenham in Kent, and Wathen played club cricket regularly for the Gentlemen of West Kent, and for others including the Gentlemen of Kent, Band of Brothers, and Sevenoaks Vine. He also played for clubs in Essex when he lived there. He played six first-class cricket matches, five of them for Gentlemen of Kent or Gentlemen of the South during Canterbury Cricket Weeks between 1862 and 1866. He also played one match for Kent in 1863 at Hove against Sussex. A spin bowler, Wathen's brother, Arthur, kept wicket to him in some matches.

Wathen followed his father into business as a tea merchant. He married Katherine Marshall in 1859 and had 13 children. Like his father, he was a member of the Worshipful Company of Mercers and was given the Freedom of the City of London. In retirement he lived in Westerham and died there in 1913 aged 76. One of his grandsons, Philip Bonham-Carter, served in the Royal Navy and played in three first-class matches for the Royal Navy cricket team during the 1920s.

== Bibliography ==
- Carlaw, Derek (2020). Kent County Cricketers, A to Z: Part One (1806–1914) (PDF). Cardiff: ACS.
