= William Boys Rashleigh =

English cricketer

Personal information
- Full name: William Boys Rashleigh
- Born: 31 January 1827; Horton Kirby, Kent, England
- Died: 30 January 1890 (aged 62); Dartford, Kent, England
- Batting: Unknown
- Bowling: Unknown
- Relatives: William Rashleigh junior (son)

Career statistics
Competition	First-class
Matches	2
Runs scored	4
Batting average	1.33
100s/50s	–/–
Top score	3
Balls bowled	?
Wickets	0
Bowling average	–
5 wickets in innings	–
10 wickets in match	–
Best bowling	–
Catches/stumpings	–/–
- Source: Cricinfo, 30 July 2020

William Boys Rashleigh (31 January 1827 – 30 June 1890) was an English first-class cricketer.

The son of The Reverend George Rashleigh, he was born in January 1827 at Horton Kirby, Kent. A farmer by profession, he played two first-class cricket matches for the Gentlemen of Kent against the Gentlemen of England in 1851 and 1853 at Lord's. He married Frances Portia King in 1863, with the couple having two sons and five daughters, amongst whom was the cricketer William Rashleigh junior. Rashleigh died at Dartford in June 1890.
