= Henry Munn =

English cricketer and British Army officer (1835–1864)

Personal information
- Full name: Henry Oldman Munn
- Born: 1835; Bobbing, Kent, England
- Died: 18 July 1864 (aged 28/29); Canterbury, Kent, England

Domestic team information
- Years: Team
- 1862: Gentlemen of Kent

Career statistics
Competition	First-class
Matches	1
Runs scored	23
Batting average	11.50
100s/50s	0/0
Top score	23
Catches/stumpings	1/–
- Source: Cricinfo, 29 July 2020

Henry Oldman Munn (1835 – 18 July 1864) was an English first-class cricketer and British Army officer.

The eldest son of William Munn and his first wife Elizabeth (née Hilton), Henry Munn was born in 1835. The family lived at Throwley House at Sheldwich near Faversham in Kent, and Munn was christened at Bobbing in September 1835. He was educated at Eton College, before being commissioned in the East Kent Militia as a lieutenant in December 1853, a regiment that his father had served in as a major. However in August 1854, he had joined the 13th Light Dragoons as a cornet by purchase. He was promoted to lieutenant without purchase in July 1855, later being promoted to captain in October 1862.

In the same year as his promotion to captain, Munn made a single appearance in first-class cricket for the Gentlemen of Kent against the Gentlemen of Marylebone Cricket Club during Canterbury Cricket Week. Batting twice in the match, he was run out in the Gentlemen of Kent first innings for 23 runs, while in their second innings he was dismissed without scoring by E. M. Grace.

Munn married Isabella Frances Toke in 1861. He died at Canterbury in July 1864.
