= Charles Fellows (disambiguation) =

Charles Fellows was a British archaeologist.

Charles Fellow(e)s may also refer to:

- Charlie Fellows (rugby union) (born 1988), English rugby union player
- Charles Fellowes (1823–1886), Royal Navy officer
