= Henry Moody =

Henry Moody may refer to:

- Henry Moody (RFC officer) (1898–1931), British World War I flying ace
- Sir Henry Moody, 1st Baronet (c. 1582–1629), English politician
- Hank Moody, the protagonist of the American television series Californication, portrayed by David Duchovny

== See also ==
- Harry Moody (disambiguation)
