= Thomas Harris (cricketer) =

English cricketer and soldier

Personal information
- Born: 9 May 1845; Bellary, Kingdom of Mysore, British India
- Died: 28 March 1918 (aged 72); Bedford Park, Middlesex
- Batting: Right-handed
- Bowling: Right-arm roundarm

Domestic team information
- Years: Team
- 1864: Kent

Career statistics
Competition	First-class
Matches	2
Runs scored	4
Batting average	1.00
100s/50s	0/0
Top score	3
Balls bowled	348
Wickets	10
Bowling average	1
5 wickets in innings	0
10 wickets in match	0
Best bowling	6/81
Catches/stumpings	1/–
- Source: CricInfo, 9 April 2012

Thomas Harris (9 May 1845 – 28 March 1918) was an English soldier and amateur cricketer who was born in British India. He was born at Bellary in British India in 1845.

Harris served with the British army from 1863 to 1893, rising to the rank of Major when he retired. He served with the 66th (Berkshire) Regiment of Foot, including in Ireland from 1868 to 1870 where he played some cricket for military teams and for an Ireland team. He later served in India and in Afghanistan during the Second Anglo-Afghan War from 1879 to 1880 as Deputy Assistant Quarter Master General with the rank of Captain in the Khandahar Field Force. He saw action at the Battle of Maiwand and the Battle of Kandahar and was mentioned in despatches. He was wounded at Girishk and at Maiwand. After the Childers Reforms of 1881 he served with the Duke of Cambridge's Own (Middlesex Regiment), retiring in 1893 with the honorary rank of Lieutenant-colonel.

Harris made a single first-class cricket appearance for Kent County Cricket Club against an England team at Canterbury in August 1864. He played his other first-class match for the Gentlemen of Kent at the same ground in the same month. The matches were the first-class fixtures of the year's Canterbury Cricket Week.

He died at Bedford Park in Middlesex in March 1918 aged 72.

== Bibliography ==
- Carlaw, Derek (2020). Kent County Cricketers, A to Z: Part One (1806–1914) (PDF). Cardiff: ACS.
