= Harry Rogers =

Harry Rogers may refer to:

- Harry Rogers (basketball) (born 1950), American former professional basketball player
- Harry Rogers (cricketer) (1889–1956), English first-class cricketer
- Harry Lovejoy Rogers (1867–1925), American United States Army officer
- Harry Rogers, a fictional character from Detective Comics #225
- Harry Rogers, trainer of 2007's Punchestown Champion Hurdle winner, Silent Oscar

== See also ==
- Harold Rogers (disambiguation)
- Henry Rogers (disambiguation)
