= Henry Taswell =

English cricketer

Personal information
- Full name: Henry Taswell
- Born: 28 July 1830; Canterbury, Kent, England
- Died: 12 July 1874 (aged 43); Sherbrooke, Quebec, Canada
- Batting: Unknown
- Relatives: Edward Taswell (brother)

Domestic team information
- Years: Team
- 1851: Oxford University

Career statistics
Competition	First-class
Matches	1
Runs scored	14
Batting average	14.00
100s/50s	–/–
Top score	13
Catches/stumpings	–/–
- Source: Cricinfo, 7 April 2020

Henry Taswell (28 July 1830 – 12 July 1874) was an English first-class cricketer.

The son of George Morris Taswell, he was born in July 1830 at Canterbury. He was educated at Rugby School, before going up to Christ Church, Oxford. While studying at Oxford, he made a single appearance in first-class cricket for Oxford University against Cambridge University in The University Match at Lord's in 1851. Batting twice in the match, he ended the Oxford first innings unbeaten on a single run, while following-on in their second innings he was dismissed for 13 runs by Charles Pontifex. He later emigrated to Canada, where he died at Sherbrooke in July 1874. His brother, Edward, was also a first-class cricketer.
