= Charlie Fellows =

Charlie Fellows may refer to:

- Charlie Fellows (rugby union) (born 1988), English rugby union player
- Charlie Fellows (gymnast) (born 1997), English gymnast

== See also ==
- Charles Fellows, British archaeologist
