= Edward Taswell =

English cricketer and soldier

Lieutenant-colonel Edward Taswell (21 June 1826 – 1 June 1889) was an English soldier and amateur cricketer who played first-class cricket between 1847 and 1863.

Taswell was born at Canterbury in 1826, the son of George Morris Taswell who was a Justice of the Peace. He joined the Royal Artillery (RA) and was commissioned as a Second lieutenant in June 1845.

He served in the RA until retiring in 1870. As a captain Taswell served at the Siege of Sebastapol during the Crimean War in 1854 and was awarded the Crimea Medal and the Turkish Crimea Medal. He was serving at Dover in 1861 in 273 Regiment before being promoted to the rank of major in 1867 and lieutenant-colonel in 1868. He retired with the honorary rank of colonel.

== Cricket ==
Taswell played for the Royal Artillery Cricket Club from 1846 to 1867. He played in minor matches for I Zingari, and then played for Gentlemen of Kent in 1847 during the first Canterbury Cricket Week to be held at the St Lawrence Ground. He made a total of nine appearances in important matches, all of them at the St Lawrence Ground, including three for Kent between 1860 and 1861.

Taswell died at Worthing in Sussex in 1889 aged 62. His brother, Henry, was also first-class cricketer.

== Bibliography ==
- Carlaw, Derek (2020). Kent County Cricketers, A to Z: Part One (1806–1914) (PDF). Cardiff: ACS.
