= Harold Rogers =

Harold Rogers may refer to:

- Harold A. Rogers (1899–1994), founder of Kin Canada
- Hal Rogers (born 1937), American politician; U.S. Congressman from Kentucky

== See also ==
- Harry Rogers (disambiguation)
- Harold Rodgers (1881–1947), the third Anglican Bishop of Sherborne in the modern era
