= William de Chair Baker =

English cricketer and cricket administrator

William de Chair Baker (21 April 1823 – 20 February 1888) was an English cricketer and cricket administrator who played for and was involved with Kent County Cricket Club throughout his life. Baker played first-class cricket for Kent and for Cambridge University from 1841 to 1853. He was credited as one of the originators of Canterbury Cricket Week and was secretary of Kent at the St Lawrence Ground in Canterbury from its establishment in 1847 until his death in 1888.

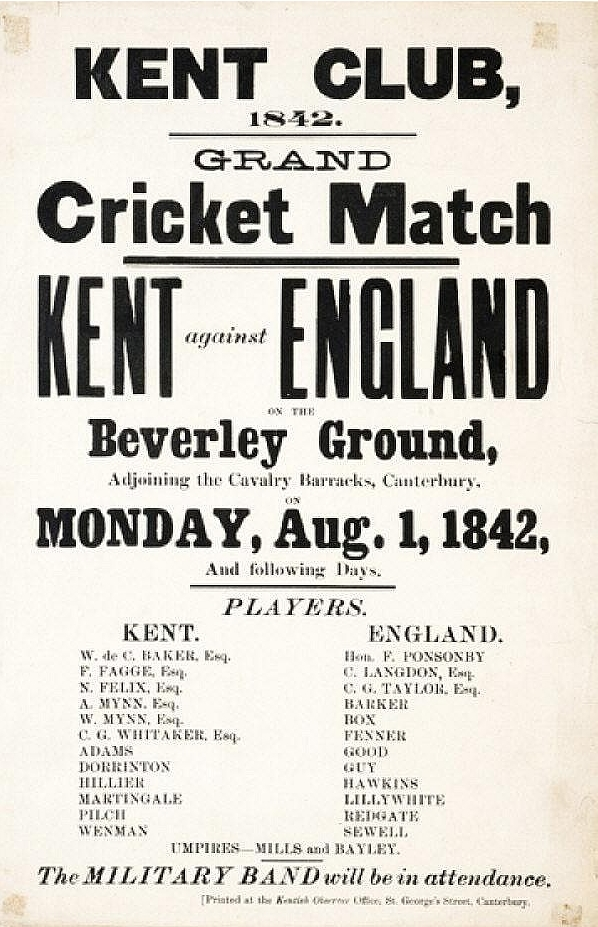
Poster for 1842 England XI game at the Beverley Ground, Canterbury

== Life and cricket career ==
Baker was born at the Deanery in Canterbury in Kent and was educated at Blackheath Proprietary School. He went up to Trinity College, Cambridge, although there is no record of his having received a university degree.

Baker played in 22 first-class cricket matches for Kent and Cambridge University, making his debut for Kent in 1841, before the foundation of the county club in 1842. He played in the new county club's first match in August 1842 against the England XI. He played a few games for the amateur Gentlemen of Kent team from 1842, and in 1843 he appeared twice for Cambridge University, though he did not play in the University Match against Oxford University.

Baker was credited as the manager of the Kent cricket team from around 1847 to his death and as one of the instigators of Canterbury Cricket Week which moved from the Beverley Ground to the St Lawrence Ground in 1847 and remains the world's longest running cricket festival. He was also responsible for a series of annual rural fetes in Canterbury.

== Bibliography ==
- Carlaw, Derek (2020). Kent County Cricketers, A to Z: Part One (1806–1914) (PDF). Cardiff: ACS.
