= Arthur Wathen =

English cricketer

Personal information
- Full name: Arthur Cave Wathen
- Born: 27 March 1841; Streatham, Surrey, England
- Died: 14 March 1937 (aged 95); Bradfield, Berkshire, England
- Batting: Right-handed
- Role: Occasional wicket-keeper
- Relatives: William Wathen (brother)

Domestic team information
- Years: Team
- 1863–1864: Kent

Career statistics
Competition	First-class
Matches	13
Runs scored	206
Batting average	8.95
100s/50s	0/0
Top score	42*
Catches/stumpings	3/3
- Source: ESPNcricinfo, 10 July 2012

Arthur Cave Wathen (27 March 1841 – 14 March 1937) was an English school teacher and amateur cricketer. Wathen was a right-handed batsman who fielded occasionally as a wicket-keeper during the 1860s.

== Life ==
Wathen was born at Streatham, then in Surrey, in 1841, the son of Hulbert and Harriet Wathen. His father was a tea merchant in London and was the Master of the Worshipful Company of Mercers in 1850. Wathen was educated at Blackheath Proprietary School before going up to Wadham College, Oxford in 1859.

Wathen played club cricket for Surrey in 1861 whilst at university, and for the Gentlemen of the South against the Gentlemen of the North at Trent Bridge in the same year, scoring 42 runs on his debut. The family lived at Beckenham in Kent, and Wathen played most of his cricket for the Gentlemen of West Kent, as well as playing for other amateur teams, including the Gentlemen of Kent, Band of Brothers and Reigate Priory. He played for Kent County Cricket Club in nine matches in 1863 and 1864, scoring a total of 147 runs at an average of 8.64, with a high score of 42 not out. He also made three appearances for the Gentlemen of Kent during Canterbury Cricket Weeks, playing twice against the Gentlemen of the Marylebone Cricket Club (MCC) in 1863 and 1864, as well against MCC in 1866, playing some matches alongside his brother William.

After 1871 Wathen moved from Beckenham to run a school on Chesham Place in Brighton. He married Agnes Richardson in 1883 and lived in Brighton for most of the remainder of his life. Despite being a teacher, he was a member of the Worshipful Company of Mercers and was given the Freedom of the City of London, both through his family connections.

Wathen died in 1937 at a nursing home at Bradfield in Berkshire. He was aged 97.

== Bibliography ==
- Carlaw, Derek (2020). Kent County Cricketers, A to Z: Part One (1806–1914) (PDF). Cardiff: ACS.
