= Harry Moody (civil servant) =

English cricketer

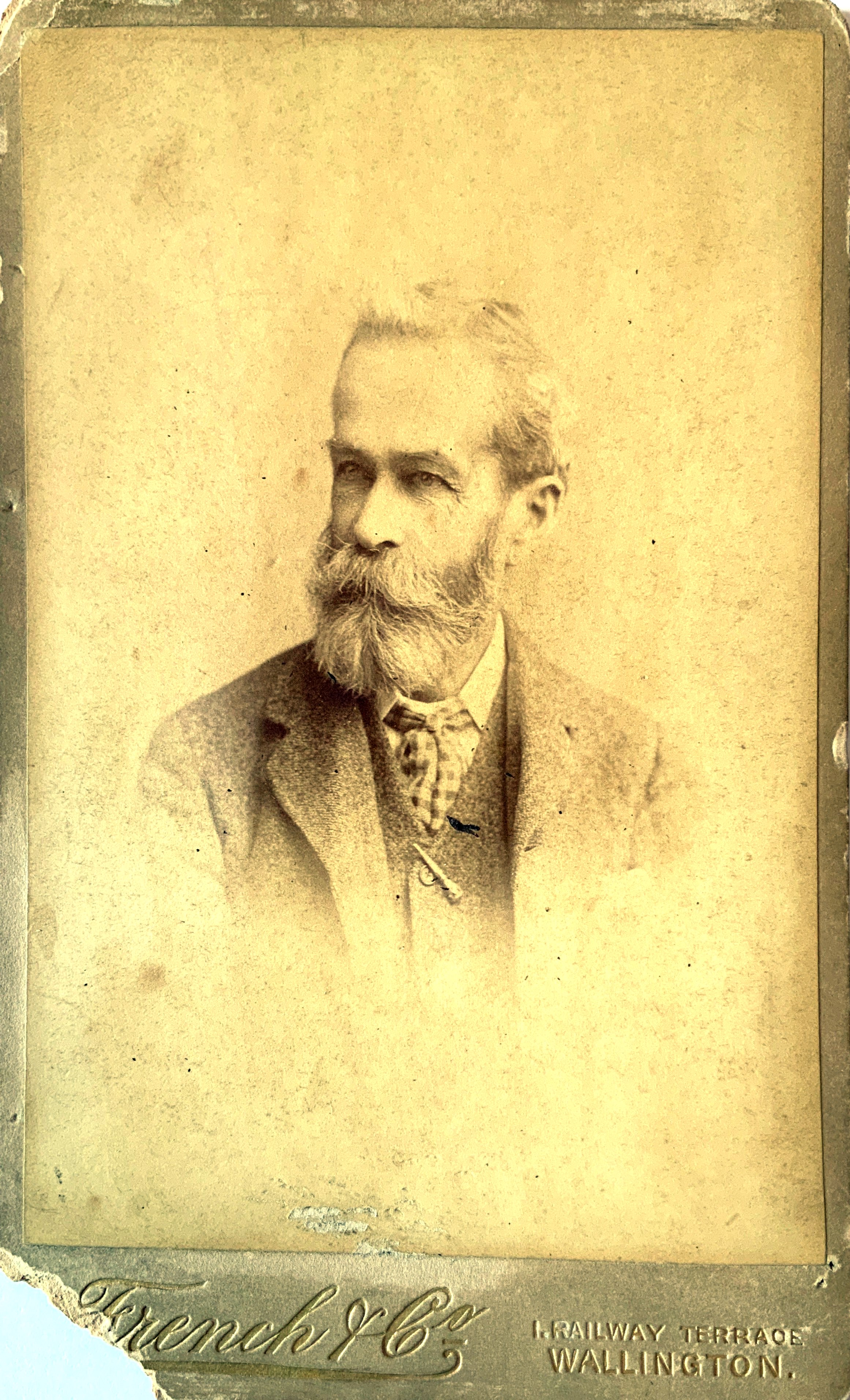

Personal information
- Born: 14 April 1832; Chartham, Kent, England
- Died: 30 March 1921 (aged 88); Bovey Tracey, Devon, England

Domestic team information
- Years: Team
- 1860: Gentlemen of Kent

Career statistics
| Competition | First-class |
|---|---|
| Matches | 1 |
| Runs scored | 1 |
| Batting average | 0.50 |
| 100s/50s | 0/0 |
| Top score | 1 |
| Catches/stumpings | 0/– |
- Source: Cricinfo, 2 August 2020

Harry Moody (14 April 1832 – 30 March 1921) was an English first-class cricketer and civil servant.

The son of The Reverend Henry Riddell Moody, he was born in April 1832 at Chartham in Kent. He was educated at Eton College, where he was president of the Eton Society, before going up to King's College, Cambridge, where he was a fellow. A year prior to his graduation from Cambridge in 1858, Moody enlisted in the Oxfordshire Militia as a lieutenant. He continued his service in the Oxfordshire Militia following his graduation, gaining the rank of captain in August 1859. He played a single match of first-class cricket for the Gentlemen of Kent against the Gentlemen of Marylebone Cricket Club during the 1860 Canterbury Cricket Week. Batting twice in the match, Moody was dismissed for a single run in the Gentlemen of Kent first innings by Harvey Fellows, while in their second innings he was dismissed without scoring by C. Wright.

Moody was appointed aide-de-camp and secretary in 1861 to the Governor of New Brunswick. His appointment was brief, with him becoming auditor–general of Trinidad. From 1867–73, Moody served as secretary to the Governor of Nova Scotia. He served Lord Dufferin as his secretary during his tenure as Governor General of Canada. Returning to England, Moody was the secretary for the Canadian Pacific Railway Company in London for approximately twenty years from 1883.

Moody was married in 1863 to Florence Susan Parker, daughter of Neville Parker, Keeper of the Rolls of New Brunswick. The couple had ten children. He died at Bovey Tracey in Devon in March 1921 aged 88.
