= Robert de Lasaux =

English cricketer

Personal information
- Full name: Robert Augustus De Lasaux
- Born: 24 November 1834; Canterbury, Kent
- Died: 7 December 1914 (aged 80); Canterbury, Kent

Domestic team information
- Years: Team
- 1858: Kent

Career statistics
Competition	First-class
Matches	3
Runs scored	41
Batting average	8.20
100s/50s	0/0
Top score	35
Balls bowled	16
Wickets	0
Bowling average	–
5 wickets in innings	–
10 wickets in match	–
Best bowling	–
Catches/stumpings	1/–
- Source: Cricinfo, 22 August 2012

Robert Augustus de Lasaux (24 November 1834 – 7 December 1914) was an English amateur cricketer. He was born at Canterbury in Kent in 1834, the son of the city coroner and was educated in Canterbury and in Kennington.

De Lasaux made his first-class debut for the Gentlemen of Kent against the Gentlemen of England at Lord's in 1858. He made two further known first-class appearances in 1858, one for Kent County Cricket Club against England and another for the Gentlemen of Kent against the Gentlemen of England at the St Lawrence Ground. He was one of the original members of the amateur Band of Brothers cricket team and of St Lawrence Cricket Club in Canterbury and was described in his Wisden obituary as "a good fast-medium round-armed bowler" and a "very smart" fielder.

De Lasaux died at Canterbury in 1914 aged 80. His obituary in The Times records that he was "an expert diabolo player" as a youth and had revived his skills for an exhibition in 1907.

== Bibliography ==
- Carlaw, Derek (2020). Kent County Cricketers, A to Z: Part One (1806–1914) (PDF). Cardiff: ACS.
