= Robert Terry (cricketer) =

English farmer and cricketer

Robert Jenkin Terry (January 1829 – 23 February 1908) was an English amateur cricketer who played in four first-class cricket matches between 1858 and 1860.

Terry was christened at Lydd in Kent in January 1829. He played for the Gentlemen of Kent cricket team, making three of his first-class appearances as well as playing in at least two minor matches for the team. In 1860 he made a single first-class appearance for Kent County Cricket Club during Canterbury Cricket Week.

Terry, a farmer, suffered bankruptcy in 1862. He died at Ramsgate in Kent in February 1908 aged 79.

== Bibliography ==
- Carlaw, Derek (2020). Kent County Cricketers, A to Z: Part One (1806–1914) (PDF). Cardiff: ACS.
