= Philip Bonham-Carter =

English cricketer and Royal Navy officer

Personal information
- Full name: Philip Herman Bonham-Carter
- Born: 12 November 1891; Karachi, Bombay Presidency, British India
- Died: 7 January 1934 (aged 42); Hampstead, Middlesex, England
- Batting: Unknown
- Relatives: William Wathen (grandfather); George Norman (great-grandfather); Maurice Bonham-Carter (uncle)

Career statistics
Competition	First-class
Matches	3
Runs scored	35
Batting average	5.83
100s/50s	–/–
Top score	16
Catches/stumpings	–/–
- Source: Cricinfo, 27 May 2019

Philip Herman Bonham-Carter (12 November 1891 – 7 January 1934) was an English first-class cricketer and Royal Navy officer.

== Life and naval career ==
Born at Karachi in British India, a member of the prominent Bonham Carter family, he was son of Herman Bonham-Carter and his wife, Margaret Louisa Wathen. Enlisting in the Royal Navy, Bonham-Carter was promoted to the rank of sub-lieutenant in January 1912, with promotion to the rank of lieutenant coming in June 1913. He served during the First World War, eventually reaching the rank of lieutenant commander. A physically strong and deeply religious man, he was known during his naval service as "Bonham the Good". Bonham-Carter played first-class cricket for the Royal Navy, debuting against the British Army cricket team at Lord's in 1919. He played two further first-class matches for the Royal Navy, against the Army at Lord's in 1921 and the Marylebone Cricket Club at Chatham in 1929. Across his three appearances, he scored a total of 35 runs with a high score of 16.

He died at Hampstead in January 1934. His uncle, Maurice Bonham-Carter, was a senior naval officer and first-class cricketer, while his grandfather, William Wathen, and great-grandfather, George Norman, both played first-class cricket.
