= Charles Oxenden =

English cricketer

Charles Oxenden (born 23 May 1800 at Deane, near Wingham Kent; died 17 March 1874 at Barham, Kent) was an English amateur cricketer who helped found the Cambridge University Cricket Club, and played for the club from 1820 to 1822. He made 4 known appearances in important matches.

Charles Oxenden was educated at Harrow School, where he captained the school cricket team in 1818, and arranged the first regular Eton v Harrow cricket match. He was admitted to Christ's College, Cambridge in 1819. Subsequently, ordained as a Church of England clergyman, he was Rector of Barham from 1846 until his death. His son, Charles junior, was also a cricketer.

== Bibliography ==
- Arthur Haygarth, Scores & Biographies, Volume 1 (1744–1826), Lillywhite, 1862
