= Gillow =

Gillow is a surname. Notable people with the surname include:

- Alfred Gillow (1835–1897), English cricketer
- Eulogio Gillow y Zavala, archbishop of Antequera
- Joseph Gillow (1850–1921), Roman Catholic antiquary
- Robert Gillow (1704–1772), cabinetmaker
- Russ Gillow (born 1940), ice hockey player
- Shara Gillow (born 1987), Australian cyclist
- Thomas Gillow (died 1687), English actor
- Wilf Gillow (born 1890s), footballer

== See also ==
- Gillow, hamlet in the parish of Hentland, Herefordshire, England
- Waring & Gillow, furniture manufacturers
- Gillows of Lancaster and London, furniture manufacturers
