= George Burnett (cricketer) =

English cricketer and distiller

Personal information
- Full name: George Richards Burnett
- Born: 23 March 1824; Streatham, Surrey, England
- Died: 13 April 1915 (aged 91); Hove, Sussex, England

Career statistics
Competition	First-class
Matches	2
Runs scored	31
Batting average	7.75
100s/50s	0/0
Top score	13
Catches/stumpings	1/–
- Source: Cricinfo, 21 July 2020

George Richards Burnett (23 March 1824 – 13 April 1915) was an English first-class cricketer and distiller.

== Biography ==
Burnett was born at Streatham in March 1824. He made two appearances in first-class cricket for the Gentlemen of Kent against the Gentlemen of England at Canterbury in 1849 and Lord's in 1850. He scored 31 runs in his two matches, with a high score of 13. Burnett was a distiller based at Vauxhall by profession. Burnett died at Hove in April 1915, aged 91.
