= Edward Harenc =

English clergyman and cricketer

Edward Alexander Frederick Harenc (14 June 1814 – 3 August 1853) was an English clergyman and first-class cricketer who played for Cambridge University in 1840 and 1841. He was born at Foots Cray in Kent and died at Broadstairs, also in Kent. He was buried at Foots Cray alongside his wife.

Edward was the son of Benjamin Harenc, whose father was a Huguenot refugee who fled to England. One of a series of cricketing brothers, the most prolific of whom was Charles Harenc, Edward Harenc played in a single match for a Gentlemen of Kent team in 1837 and then in three matches while at Cambridge University, the last of which was the 1841 University Match against Oxford University. Harenc opened the innings for Cambridge in the first innings, and came in at first wicket down in the second, but his scores were 0 and 2 in a very tight game won by Cambridge by only eight runs.

His mother, Sophia, was a member of the Berens family, which was closely associated with cricket in Kent. His first cousins Richard and Henry Berens played for Gentleman of Kent.

== Career outside cricket ==
Harenc was educated at Magdalene College, Cambridge. He was ordained as a priest on graduation and was priest in charge of the parish of Longcot, then in Berkshire (now in Oxfordshire), from 1846 to 1853.

Aside from Charles, his other brothers Archibald and Henry also played first-class cricket.
