= Richard Thomas (cricketer, born 1792) =

English cricketer

Personal information
- Full name: Richard Thomas
- Born: 1792; Chatham, Kent
- Died: 30 May 1881 (aged 88/89); Hollingbourne, Kent

Domestic team information
- Years: Team
- 1833: Marylebone Cricket Club

Career statistics
| Competition | First-class |
|---|---|
| Matches | 5 |
| Runs scored | 28 |
| Batting average | 4.00 |
| 100s/50s | 0/0 |
| Top score | 9* |
| Catches/stumpings | 3/– |
- Source: Cricinfo, 28 August 2014

Richard Thomas (1792 – 30 May 1881) was an English cricketer active in the early 1830s. Born at Chatham, Kent at some point in 1792, Thomas made five appearances in first-class cricket for four teams.

He made his first-class debut for the Gentlemen of Kent against the Marylebone Cricket Club at Lord's in June 1833, before playing for the Marylebone Cricket Club against the Gentlemen of Kent in August of that year. He made two appearances for England against Sussex in August and September 1833, before making a final first-class appearance for Kent against England in 1835. He scored 28 runs in his five matches, top-scoring with 9 not out.

He died at Eyhorne House, Hollingbourne, Kent on 30 May 1881.

== Bibliography ==
- Carlaw, Derek (2020). Kent County Cricketers, A to Z: Part One (1806–1914) (PDF). Cardiff: ACS.
