= Archie Fellows =

English footballer

Personal information
- Full name: Arthur Fellows
- Date of birth: 1880
- Place of birth: Wednesfield, England
- Position: Inside forward

Senior career*
Years	Team	Apps	(Gls)
1890–1901	Willenhall Pickwick		
1901–1903	Wolverhampton Wanderers	54	(8)
1903–1904	Darlaston		
1904–1905	Halesowen		
1905	Netherton		
Total		54	(8)
- * Club domestic league appearances and goals

Arthur Fellows (1880–unknown) was an English footballer who played in the Football League for Wolverhampton Wanderers.
