= Henry Rogers (cricketer) =

English cricketer and Indian Civil Service officer

Personal information
- Full name: Henry Middleton Rogers
- Born: 29 March 1840; Sevenoaks, Kent, England
- Died: 16 November 1915 (aged 75); Tunbridge Wells, Kent, England
- Batting: Unknown

Career statistics
Competition	First-class
Matches	1
Runs scored	10
Batting average	–
100s/50s	–/–
Top score	9*
Catches/stumpings	1/–
- Source: Cricinfo, 27 July 2020

Henry Middleton Rogers JP (20 March 1840 – 16 November 1915) was an English first-class cricketer and an officer in the Indian Civil Service.

The son of John Rogers, he was born at Sevenoaks in March 1840. He was educated at Harrow School, before going up to Balliol College, Oxford. In 1859, Rogers made a single appearance in first-class cricket for the Gentlemen of Kent against the Gentlemen of England at Canterbury. He batted twice in the match, ending each innings' unbeaten with scores of 1 batting at number eleven in the Gentlemen of Kent first innings and 9 opening the batting in their second innings.

In 1860 he joined the Indian Civil Service and in 1863 he was an assistant magistrate and collector at Shahjehanpore, a post he held until 1865. He spent 1865 and 1866 in charge of the settlement at Phillibect, before serving as an assistant settlement officer at Meerut from 1867–70. He held the same post at Azamgarh District in 1873, where he was praised by the Secretary of State for India for his actions during flooding as Azamgarh. His time at Azamgarh was brief, with Rogers moving to Allahabad where he served as a joint magistrate for the city until 1874. He was invalided in 1874 and returned to England, where he later served as a justice of the peace for Kent. Rogers died following a short illness at Tunbridge Wells in November 1915.
