= Medhurst Troughton =

English cricketer

Medhurst Albert Troughton (25 December 1839 – 1 January 1912) was an English cricketer who played first-class cricket for Kent and for amateur teams between 1862 and 1873. He was born in Milton-next-Gravesend, Kent and died at Kensington, London. He was a cousin of Lionel Troughton, who captained Kent before and after the First World War.

Troughton was a right-handed middle-order batsman and an occasional right-arm under-arm slow bowler. He played in a couple of matches for the amateur Gentlemen of Kent from 1862, but from 1864 to 1870 played in most of the first-class matches for the main Kent team. His best year as a batsman was 1865, when he scored 289 runs at an average of 24.08; the runs included his highest score, an innings of 87 in the match against Yorkshire. He returned to the Kent team for a single match against an eleven raised by W. G. Grace in 1873.

A brief obituary in The Times in 1912 credited him with the promotion of cricket in the Gravesend area and the secretaryship of "the Mid-Kent club".

== Bibliography ==
- Carlaw, Derek (2020). Kent County Cricketers, A to Z: Part One (1806–1914) (PDF). Cardiff: ACS.
