= Edward Swann (cricketer) =

English cricketer

Edward Gibbon Swann (13 August 1823 – 20 December 1900) was an English first-class cricketer active 1843–48 who played for Kent. He was born in Geneva and died in Burgess Hill. He played in 14 first-class matches.

== Bibliography ==
- Carlaw, Derek (2020). Kent County Cricketers, A to Z: Part One (1806–1914) (PDF). Cardiff: ACS.
