= Arthur Payne (cricketer) =

English cricketer

Arthur Frederick Payne (7 December 1831 at Leicester – 23 July 1910 at Brighton, Sussex) was an English amateur cricketer who played from 1854 to 1867. He was the twin brother of Alfred Payne.

Payne was a student at Trinity College, Oxford, matriculating in 1851 and graduating B.A. in 1856. A right-handed batsman who was mainly associated with Oxford University and Marylebone Cricket Club (MCC), he made 10 known appearances.
