= Henry Berens =

English cricketer and official of the Hudson's Bay Company

Henry Hulse Berens (24 November 1804 – 23 August 1883) was an English first-class cricketer and official of the Hudson's Bay Company (HBC).

== Early life and family ==
Berens was born in Kevington, Kent, the son of Joseph Berens Jr. and Charlotte Benyon. Several members of the Berens family served on the committee of the HBC: his great-grandfather Herman Berens, his grandfather Joseph Berens, his father and later Berens himself. His mother was the daughter of Richard Benyon, MP, and granddaughter of Richard Benyon, President of Madras.

== Cricket ==
Berens was active as a cricketer from 1837 to 1838 and played for Gentlemen of Kent. He appeared in two first-class matches. His brother Richard also played for Gentlemen of Kent.

His first cousins (through his father's sister Sophia, who married Benjamin Harenc) were cricketers Charles Harenc, Edward Harenc, and Archibald Harenc.

== Career ==
Berens became a member of the Committee of the HBC in 1833 and became deputy Governor in 1856. He was Governor of the Hudson's Bay Company from 1858 to 1863. He served as a director of the Bank of England from 1849 to 1880.

== Personal life ==
Berens married Elinor Stone in 1842. They had one daughter, Ellinor Frances Berens, before his wife died in 1846. He died in 1883 in Sidcup.

== Bibliography ==
- Haygarth, Arthur (1996) [1862]. Scores & Biographies, Volume 1 (1744–1826). Kennington: Frederick Lillywhite. ISBN 978-19-00592-23-9.
- Haygarth, Arthur (1997) [1862]. Scores & Biographies, Volume 2 (1827–1840). Kennington: Frederick Lillywhite. ISBN 978-19-00592-23-9.
