= Henry Mayne =

English cricketer and lawyer

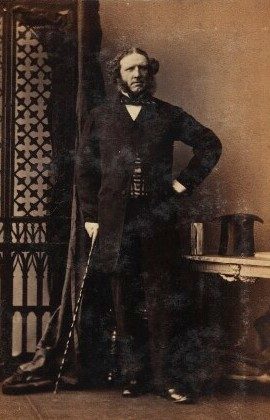
- Mayne photographed in 1861

Personal information
- Full name: Henry Blair Mayne
- Born: 23 August 1813; Limpsfield, Surrey
- Died: 17 January 1892 (aged 78); Brighton, Sussex

Domestic team information
- Years: Team
- 1834–1838: Oxford University
- FC debut: 12 August 1833 Gentlemen of Kent v Marylebone Cricket Club (MCC)
- Last FC: 23 August 1849 Gentlemen of Kent v Gentlemen of England

Career statistics
Competition	First-class
Matches	18
Runs scored	130
Batting average	5.65
100s/50s	0/0
Top score	17
Balls bowled	? (Note: It is not known how many balls Mayne bowled in first-class cricket or how many runs he conceded. Scorecards from the time he played did not always fully record a bowler's analysis.)
Wickets	5
Bowling average	?
5 wickets in innings	0
10 wickets in match	0
Best bowling	3/?
Catches/stumpings	7/–
- Source: CricInfo, 28 August 2020

Henry Blair Mayne (23 August 1813 – 17 January 1892) was an English lawyer and amateur cricketer who played first-class cricket between 1833 and 1849.

== Life ==
A son of the Rev. Robert Mayne, Rector of Limpsfield, by his wife Mrs Charlotte Cunningham née Graham, he was educated at Westminster School and Christ Church, Oxford, where he matriculated in 1831 and graduated B.A. in 1835, proceeding M.A. in 1838. At school Mayne was a rower, continuing to row at stroke for Christ Church as well as playing first-class cricket for Oxford University.

Mayne studied law at the Middle Temple where he was called to the Bar in 1845. From 1850 he served as a Clerk in the Private Bills Office of the House of Commons, becoming its Principal Clerk in 1870.

Mayne, notable among the group which helped to write the rules of Short Whist, died at Brighton in Sussex on 17 January 1892, aged 78.

== Cricketer ==
Mayne played in 18 first-class cricket matches between 1833 and 1849, for a variety of teams. He made his first-class debut in 1833 for the Gentlemen of Kent before playing four times for Oxford University between 1834 and 1838. He played for a Kent team in 1835, before the foundation of the County Club, and went on to play once for Kent County Cricket Club in 1844. He made seven appearances for Marylebone Cricket Club (MCC), four for the Gentlemen of Kent and one for the Gentlemen of England. He played regularly in club cricket for I Zingari, MCC, and Bramshill in Hampshire.

== Bibliography ==
- Carlaw, Derek (2020). Kent County Cricketers, A to Z: Part One (1806–1914) (PDF). Cardiff: ACS.
