= Beverley Ground =

Cricket ground in Canterbury, Kent, England

- Interactive map of Beverley Ground

Ground information
- Location: Canterbury, Kent
- Country: England
- Coordinates: 51.288°N 1.098°E (approx.)
- Establishment: 1839 (first recorded match)
- Last used: 1846

Team information
Beverley Cricket Club	(1839–1843)
Kent County Cricket Club	(1841–1846)
Gentlemen of Kent	(1842–1846)
- As of 30 November 2017; Source: CricketArchive

The Beverley Ground was a cricket ground in Canterbury in Kent. It was in use in the mid-19th century, with recorded matches taking place between 1839 and 1846. It was the home ground of Beverley Cricket Club and was where the first Kent County Cricket Club was formed in August 1842 during Canterbury Cricket Week which was held at the ground until 1846.

The ground was on the Sturry Road in east Canterbury. The name may also refer to the club's previous ground at St Stephen's in north Canterbury. A total of 15 first-class cricket matches were held on the ground.

== Establishment and cricket history ==
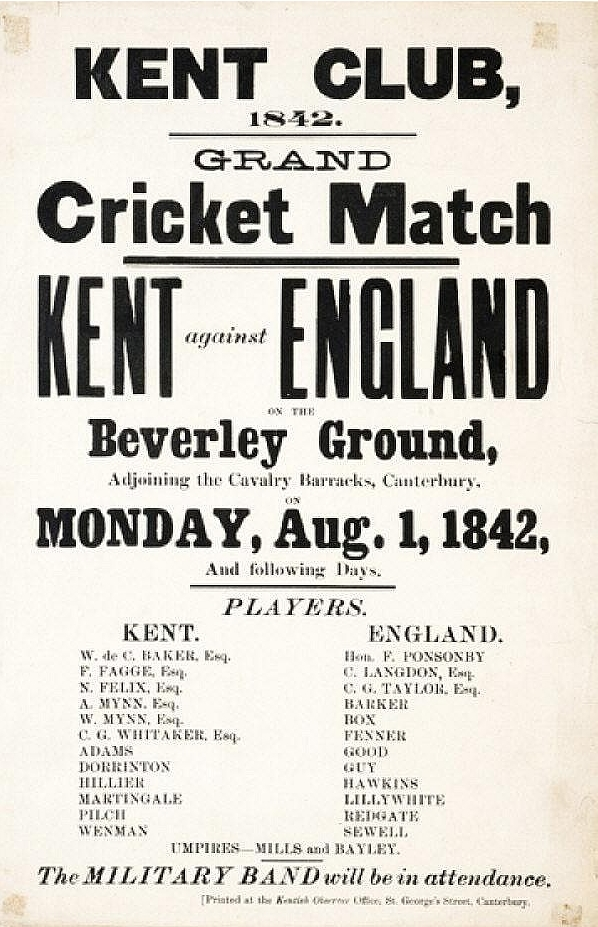
Poster for the 1842 match against an England XI

Some of the earliest references to cricket are found in Kent and teams from the county dominated the game between 1830 and 1850. The Beverley Cricket Club was formed in 1835 at the Canterbury estate of brothers John and William Baker. They initially played on the Beverley Meadow, a field behind the Baker's home which was named Beverley, in the St Stephen's district of north Canterbury, land owned by the Bakers, and it is thought possible that the ground may have been referred to as the Beverley Ground. The nearby Ye Olde Beverlie Inn served as their clubhouse. In 1839 the club held their first Cricket Week which drew 4,000 spectators.

In July 1839 the first recorded match was held at the Beverley Ground between Beverley Cricket Club and Chilston. The new ground was described as "a field near the Cavalry Barracks" and was on the Sturry Road in north-east Canterbury, although its precise location is not known. It held its first first-class cricket match in August 1841 when an England XI unexpectedly defeated a Kent XI by 74 runs in "the crack game of the season".

The Beverley club became the Kent Cricket Club on 6 August 1842, when it reconstituted itself during the annual cricket festival. The club was the first formal incarnation of the club which is known today as Kent County Cricket Club and the 1842 cricket festival is seen by Kent as being the first Canterbury Cricket Week. The ground was described in The Times during the match:

The ground was very tastefully laid out. The pavilion, in which a first-rate cold collation was spread, occupied the further part of the field, and on each team, in the form of a semicircle, were marquees, tents, benches, and accommodation of all kinds for the spectators.

– The Times, 3 August 1842

A total of 15 first-class matches were held on the ground between 1841 and 1846. They all involved either Kent or Gentlemen of Kent amateur teams who played annually against England XIs and Gentlemen of England XIs. In 1847 the Canterbury Cricket Week moved across the city to the newly established St Lawrence Ground in the south-east of the city, and the Beverley Ground appears to have not been used after that date. The current Canterbury Cricket Club, who play at the Polo Farm to the east of the city, is the modern descendant of the Beverley Club.

== Records on the ground ==
A total of 15 first-class cricket matches were held on the ground.

- Highest total: 278 by Kent XI against England, 1842
- Lowest total: 31 by Kent XI against England, 1841
- Highest partnership: 154, 4th wicket by F Pilch and N Felix, for Kent XI against England, 1842
- Highest individual score: 98, F Pilch, for Kent XI against England, 1842
- Best bowling in an innings: 8/37, A Mynn for Gentlemen of Kent against Gentlemen of England, 1843
- Best bowling in a match: 15/73, A Mynn for Gentlemen of Kent against Gentlemen of England, 1843

== Bibliography ==
- Birley, Derek (1999). A Social History of English Cricket. London: Aurum Press. ISBN 978-18-54107-10-7 – via Internet Archive.
