= Stewart Fellows =

English footballer

Personal information
- Full name: Stewart Fellows
- Date of birth: 9 October 1948 (age 78)
- Place of birth: Stockton-on-Tees, England
- Position: Half-back

Youth career
- –1966: Newcastle United

Senior career*
Years	Team	Apps	(Gls)
1966–1967	Newcastle United	0	(0)
1967–1968	York City	2	(0)
1968–????	King's Lynn		
Total		2	(0)
- * Club domestic league appearances and goals

Stewart Fellows (born 9 October 1948) is an English former professional footballer who played as a half-back in the Football League for York City, in non-League football for King's Lynn, and was on the books of Newcastle United without making a league appearance.
