= William Rashleigh (cricketer) =

English cricketer (1867–1937)

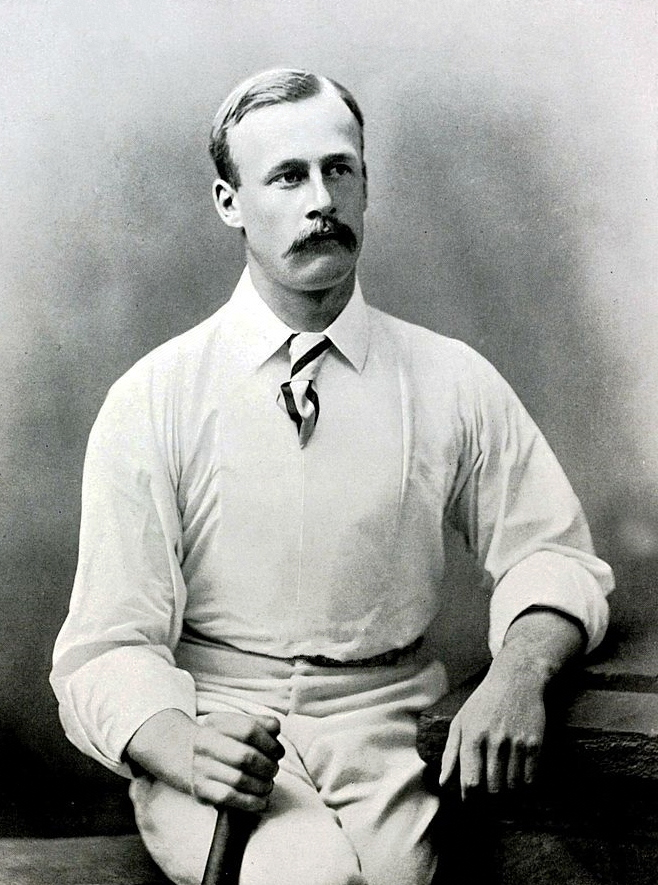
- Rashleigh c.1895

Personal information
- Full name: William Rashleigh
- Born: 7 March 1867; Farningham, Kent
- Died: 13 February 1937 (aged 69); Balcombe, Sussex
- Batting: Right-handed
- Bowling: Right-arm slow
- Relatives: William Boys Rashleigh (father); Charles Edward Rashleigh (uncle)

Domestic team information
- Years: Team
- 1885–1901: Kent
- 1886–1889: Oxford University

Career statistics
Competition	First-class
Matches	127
Runs scored	5,379
Batting average	25.13
100s/50s	9/21
Top score	163
Balls bowled	29
Wickets	0
Bowling average	–
5 wickets in innings	–
10 wickets in match	–
Best bowling	–
Catches/stumpings	56/–
- Source: CricInfo, 6 September 2012

William Rashleigh (7 March 1867 – 13 February 1937) was an English cricketer who played first-class cricket for Kent County Cricket Club and Oxford University between 1885 and 1901. He was born at Farningham in Kent and died at Balcombe in Sussex.

== Cricket career ==
Rashleigh was the son of farmer and cricketer William Boys Rashleigh. He played in the Tonbridge School XI from 1882 to 1885, and made his first-class debut for Kent on 24 August 1885. He went up to Brasenose College, Oxford that autumn. he gained his blue as a freshman. In July 1886 he joined Kingsmill Key in a stand of 243, a record first-wicket partnership at that time in a Varsity Match; both batsmen hit centuries, but no other batsman in the innings reached double figures. Altogether in first-class cricket he passed one hundred in nine innings. The right-handed batsman's top score of 163 was made against Middlesex in June 1896.

== Teaching and ecclesiastical career ==
After occupying posts at Uppingham School and Tonbridge as assistant master, Rashleigh took Holy Orders in 1892. He was a minor canon at Canterbury Cathedral between 1903 and 1912, rector of St George's, Canterbury from 1912 to 1916, and subsequently vicar of Horton Kirby and Ridgmont.

== Bibliography ==
- Carlaw, Derek (2020). Kent County Cricketers, A to Z: Part One (1806–1914) (PDF). Cardiff: ACS.
