= Frederick Dyer (cricketer) =

English cricketer and doctor

Personal information
- Full name: Frederick John Dyer
- Born: 26 June 1824; Lewisham, Kent, England
- Died: 23 October 1866 (aged 42); Stevenage, Hertfordshire, England
- Batting: Unknown
- Bowling: Unknown

Career statistics
Competition	First-class
Matches	4
Runs scored	12
Batting average	1.71
100s/50s	–/–
Top score	5
Balls bowled	60
Wickets	1
Bowling average	?
5 wickets in innings	–
10 wickets in match	–
Best bowling	1/?
Catches/stumpings	2/–
- Source: Cricinfo, 22 July 2020

Frederick John Dyer (26 June 1824 – 23 October 1866) was an English first-class cricketer and medical doctor.

The son of James Holland Dyer, he was born at Lewisham in June 1824. Dyer studied and trained to become a surgeon, for which he was a fellow of the Royal College of Surgeons. He played first-class cricket for the Gentlemen of Kent between 1849 and 1854, making four appearances against the Gentlemen of England. He scored 12 runs in his four matches, in addition to taking a single wicket. Dyer died from consumption at Stevenage in October 1866.
