= Thomas Sanders (cricketer) =

English cricketer

Thomas Sanders (18 October 1809 – 25 March 1852) was an English cricketer with amateur status. He was associated with Cambridge University and made his debut in 1828.

Sanders was educated at Eton College and King's College, Cambridge. he was a fellow of King's 1831–45. During this time he was admitted to the Inner Temple and was called to the Bar in 1839.

== Bibliography ==
- Haygarth, Arthur (1996) [1862]. Scores & Biographies, Volume 1 (1744–1826). Kennington: Frederick Lillywhite. ISBN 978-19-00592-23-9.
- Haygarth, Arthur (1997) [1862]. Scores & Biographies, Volume 2 (1827–1840). Kennington: Frederick Lillywhite. ISBN 978-19-00592-23-9.
