= William Dyer (divine) =

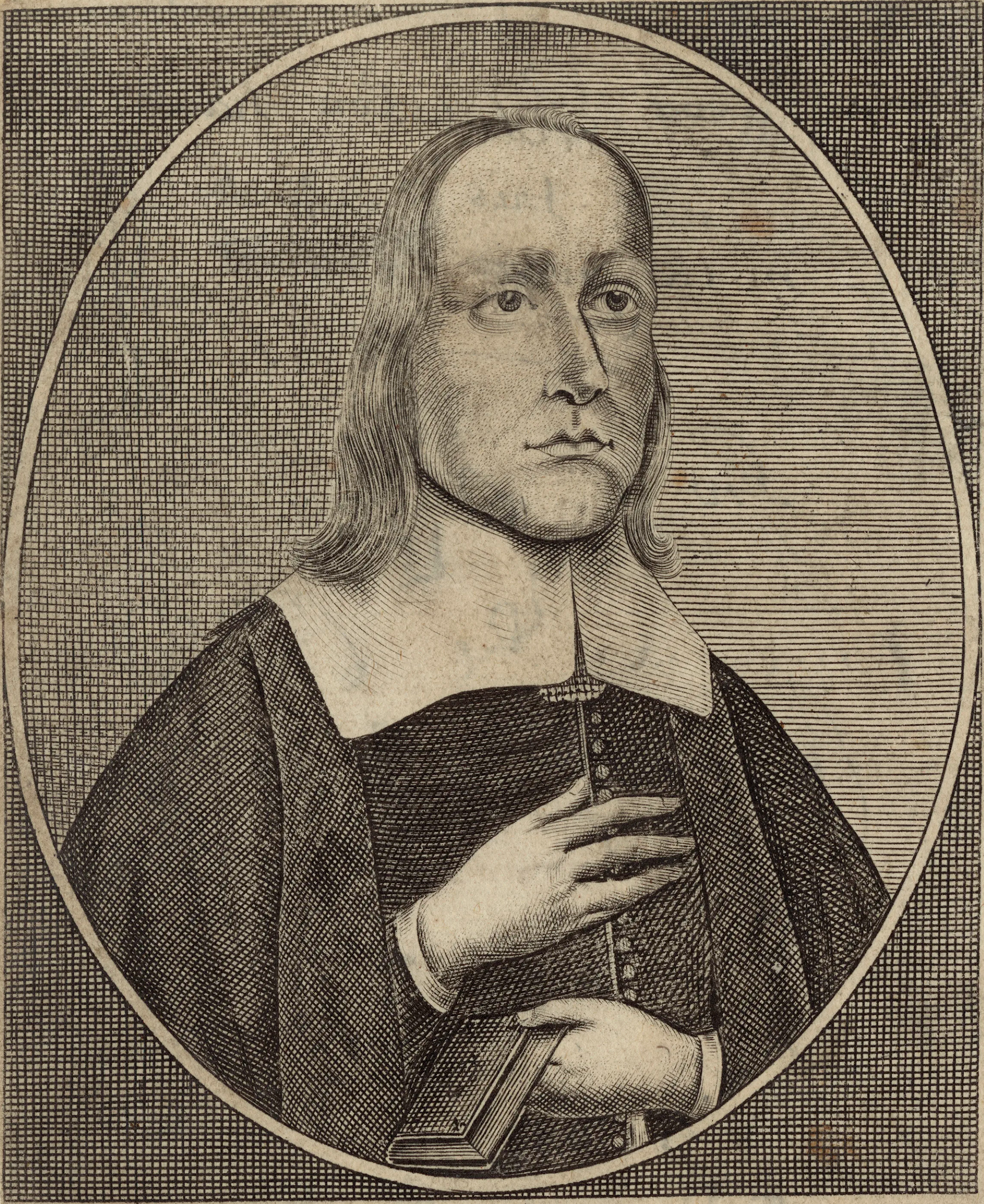
1668 engraving of Dyer

William Dyer (d. 1696) was an English nonconformist divine.

He was at one time minister of Chesham, and subsequently of Cholesbury, Buckinghamshire. Granger says he was ejected in 1662, but his name appears as minister in 1663. He was a preacher at St. Anne's, Aldersgate Street, in London, about the time of the plague. Kennett affirms that in later life he joined the quakers; but although he certainly sympathised with their views there is nothing to support this statement, except that at his death in 1696, when about sixty, he was buried in the quaker burial-ground at Southwark. Calamy says he "inclined to the quakers", but there is no record of his having been received into the Society of Friends. According his DNB biographer Augustus Charles Bickley, Dyer was "a pious, melancholy man, and an effective and fervent preacher." His literary style has been compared to that of Bunyan.

He wrote:

1. A Cabinet of Jewels, or a Glimpse of Sion's Glory, 1663
2. Christ's Famous Titles and a Believer's Golden Chain, 1663
3. Christ's Voice to London and the Day of God's Wrath; Sermons in the time of the Plague, 1666
4. Mount Sion, or a draught of that Church which shall never be destroyed, 1689

His works were reprinted at Glasgow in 1761.
