= Archibald Harenc =

English cricketer

- Born: 20 September 1821; Foots Cray, Kent
- Died: 5 August 1884 (aged 62); Langton Matravers, Dorset
- Military career
- Allegiance: United Kingdom
- Branch: British Army
- Service years: 1842–1881
- Rank: Lieutenant-general
- Units: 97th Regiment of Foot; 53rd Regiment of Foot
- Commands: 53rd Regiment of Foot (1864–1870)
- Conflicts: Siege of Lucknow
- Awards: Indian Mutiny Medal

Archibald Richard Harenc (20 September 1821 – 5 August 1884) was an English soldier, and an amateur cricketer who played in twelve matches between 1840 and 1859.

== Early life ==
Harenc was born in 1821 at Foots Cray in Kent, the youngest son of Benjamin Harenc who owned Foots Cray Place, an 18th-century neo-Palladian house built in the style of the Villa Rotunda which had been purchased by Charles' grandfather, also named Benjamin, in 1772. The Harenc family were originally Huguenot refugees from France and Harenc's grandfather established a silk mill at Foots Cray in 1775 and served as High Sheriff of Kent in 1777.

Harenc's father was an East India Company merchant and a keen cricketer, playing for Prince's Plain, a club which preceded the West Kent club; his mother, Sophia, was a member of the Berens family, which was closely associated with cricket in Kent; his first cousins Richard and Henry Berens both played first-class matches for the Gentlemen of Kent.

Archibald was educated at Harrow School between 1832 and 1836.

== Cricket ==
Archibald Harenc
Personal information
- Batting: Right-handed
- Bowling: Right-arm medium
- Relatives: Henry Harenc (brother); Charles Harenc (brother); Edward Harenc (brother)

Domestic team information
- Years: Team
- 1840: Kent
- 1842–1859: Gentlemen of Kent
- FC debut: 17 August 1840 Kent XI v England
- Last FC: 14 July 1859 Gentlemen of Kent v Gentlemen of England
- Source: ESPNcricinfo, 30 December 2021

Harenc played mostly for amateur teams, including the Gentlemen of Kent and the Gentlemen of England, although he made two appearances for Kent in 1840 before the formation of the first Kent County Cricket Club. Harenc is not recorded as having played cricket at school, but was an effective bowler in amateur cricket. Whilst serving in the Army he played for Canada against the United States at Montreal in 1845. His brothers, Charles, Henry and Edward also played, Charles for Kent teams.

== Military career ==
Harenc served in the British Army from 1842, joining 97th Regiment of Foot as an ensign. He served during the Indian Mutiny of 1858–1859 as a captain, seeing action at a number of locations, including the Siege of Lucknow and was awarded the Indian Mutiny Medal and Mentioned in Dispatches. He was promoted to the rank of lieutenant-colonel in 1860, transferring to the 53rd Regiment of Foot, commanding the regiment between 1864 and 1870. He retired with the rank of Lieutenant-general.

== Family and later life ==
Harenc married Amy Farquharson in 1862 and Blandford Forum in Dorset; the couple had four children. His primary residence was recorded in his obituary as being Kimpton House near Welwyn in Hertfordshire. He died at Langton Matravers in Dorset in 1884 aged 62.

== Bibliography ==
- Carlaw, Derek (2020). Kent County Cricketers, A to Z: Part One (1806–1914) (PDF). Cardiff: ACS.
