= Alfred Lowth =

English cricketer and cleric

Personal information
- Full name: Alfred James Lowth
- Born: 27 July 1817; Chiswick, Middlesex
- Died: 5 February 1907 (aged 89); Winchester, Hampshire
- Batting: Left-handed
- Bowling: Left-arm fast
- Role: Bowler

Domestic team information
- Years: Team
- 1837–1841: Oxford University Cricket Club
- Source: CricketArchive., 15 April 2013

Alfred James "Dandy" Lowth (27 July 1817 – 5 February 1907) was an English cleric and cricketer with amateur status. As a cricketer he was active from 1836 to 1841, when his career was cut short because of failing eyesight.

== Career ==
Lowth matriculated at Exeter College, Oxford, becoming a scholar in 1838. He graduated B.A. in 1841, and M.A. in 1844.

After graduating at Oxford, Lowth became a Church of England priest and was perpetual curate of Alderholt, Dorset, 1849–54; perpetual curate of Branksea Island in Poole Harbour, Dorset, 1854–60; rector of Hamworthy, Dorset, 1860–63;, and rector of St Swithun-upon-Kingsgate, Winchester, 1865–85.

== Cricketer ==
Lowth was a left arm fast bowler, using a roundarm action, who was recorded in 8 matches designated by CricketArchive. He totalled 101 runs with a highest score of 24 and held 3 catches. His bowling record was outstanding as he took 63 wickets in his eight games and twice achieved ten wickets in a match. Lowth played six times for Oxford University Cricket Club and also represented the Gentlemen twice in the Gentlemen v Players series.

Known as "Dandy", Lowth appeared for the Gentlemen in the 1836 match when still a pupil at Winchester College. He was only 5 feet 4 inches tall, which is small for a fast bowler but he was described as a "pocket Hercules". His action was described as "natural roundarm at the height of the shoulder" and, although a fast bowler, he put a lot of spin on the ball. A letter to The Times in 1919 quoted from the preface to John Wisden's book Public School Matches: "Probably the greatest bowler who has ever hailed from Winchester was A. J. Lowth, who holds the unique record of having represented the Gentlemen of England v. the Players at Lord's whilst still a boy at school." A reply from Pelham Warner three days later indicated that Lowth's feat was achieved for a team of 18 Gentlemen against 11 Players, and "that Mr G. T. S. Stevens is entitled to the honour of having achieved a unique feat" in that he appeared in a full Gentlemen v Players game while still at school.

Lowth played for Oxford for three seasons and made another appearance for the Gentlemen in 1841 but his career ended early due to failing eyesight.

== Publication ==
- Winchester Cathedral: an historical poem, Jacob & Johnson, "Hampshire Chronicle" Office, Winchester, 1897

== Bibliography ==
- Altham, H. S. (1962). A History of Cricket, Volume 1 (to 1914). George Allen & Unwin.
- Haygarth, Arthur (1996) [1862]. Scores & Biographies, Volume 1 (1744–1826). Kennington: Frederick Lillywhite. ISBN 978-19-00592-23-9.
- Haygarth, Arthur (1997) [1862]. Scores & Biographies, Volume 2 (1827–1840). Kennington: Frederick Lillywhite. ISBN 978-19-00592-23-9.* Warner, Pelham (1946). Lord's: 1787–1945. Harrap.
