= Joseph Spencer (cricketer) =

English cricketer, British Army officer, engineer and inventor

Personal information
- Full name: Joseph Blakey Spencer
- Born: July 1809; Longsight, Lancashire, England
- Died: 9 August 1877 (aged 68); Blackheath, Kent, England
- Batting: Unknown
- Bowling: Unknown

Career statistics
Competition	First-class
Matches	2
Runs scored	36
Batting average	9.00
100s/50s	–/–
Top score	19
Balls bowled	142
Wickets	3
Bowling average	–
5 wickets in innings	–
10 wickets in match	–
Best bowling	3/?
Catches/stumpings	–/–
- Source: Cricinfo, 27 July 2020

Joseph Blakey Spencer (July 1809 – 9 August 1877) was an English first-class cricketer, British Army soldier and inventor.

Spencer was born at Longsight in Manchester in July 1809. A soldier in the Royal Artillery, which was based at Woolwich, Spencer one appearance in first-class cricket for the Gentlemen of Kent against the Gentlemen of England at Lord's in 1843. The following year he made another appearance in first-class cricket, this time for the Gentlemen in the Gentlemen v Players fixture. He scored 36 runs in his two matches, in addition to taking 3 wickets for the Gentlemen of Kent. Spencer later worked in the 1850s on improving early photographic apparatus alongside the photographer Arthur James Melhuish. He was appointed to be an honorary quartermaster of the 1st Administrative Battalion Kent Rifle Volunteers in March 1866, which he held until his resignation in March 1873. Spencer died at Blackheath in August 1877.
