= William Banks (cricketer) =

Welsh-born English cricketer

William John Banks (25 April 1822 – 17 January 1901) was a Welsh-born English amateur cricketer who played first-class cricket for Kent County Cricket Club and the amateur Gentlemen of Kent teams in the 1840s. He was born at Swansea and died at Oxney Court near Dover in Kent.

As a cricketer played 10 first-class matches between 1843 and 1848. His highest innings was a score of 38 when he opened the batting with his brother, Edward, for the Gentlemen of Kent against the Gentlemen of England at Lord's in 1845. His Wisden obituary quoted from Scores and Biographies which described him as "a hard hitter and an active field".

Banks was the grandson of Sir Edward Banks who built the 19th century London Bridge.

== Bibliography ==
- Carlaw, Derek (2020). Kent County Cricketers, A to Z: Part One (1806–1914) (PDF). Cardiff: ACS.
