= Joseph Spence =

Joe or Joseph Spence may refer to:

- Joseph Spence (musician) (1910–1984), Bahamian singer and guitarist
- Joseph Spence (author) (1699–1768), literary scholar and anecdotist
- Joseph Spence (headmaster) (born 1959), Headmaster of Dulwich College, England, 2009-2024
- Joe Spence (footballer, born 1898) (1898–1966), English international football player for Manchester United
- Joe Spence (footballer, born 1925) (1925–2009), English football player for York City

== See also ==
- Jo Spence (1934–1992), British photographer
