= Henry Pepys (cricketer) =

English cricketer

Personal information
- Full name: Henry Pepys
- Born: 1840; Marylebone, Middlesex, England
- Died: 23 December 1918 (aged 77–78); Hove, Sussex, England
- Batting: Unknown

Career statistics
Competition	First-class
Matches	2
Runs scored	32
Batting average	8.00
100s/50s	–/–
Top score	16
Catches/stumpings	3/–
- Source: Cricinfo, 29 February 2020

Henry Pepys (1840 – 23 December 1918) was an English first-class cricketer and barrister.

The son of Edmund Pepys, he was born in 1840 at Marylebone. He was educated at Eton College, before going up to Oriel College, Oxford. Pepys played first-class cricket for the Gentlemen of Kent in 1861 and 1862, making two appearances for the Gentlemen of Marylebone Cricket Club at Canterbury. He scored 32 runs in his two matches, with a high score of 16.

A student of Lincoln's Inn, he was called to the bar in April 1864. Pepys was married to Mélanie Jenkins, the daughter of Sir Richard Jenkins and widow of William Vansittart. Pepys died at Hove in December 1918.
