= Alfred Gillow =

English cricketer and farmer

Personal information
- Born: 2 May 1835; St Nicholas-at-Wade, Kent
- Died: 12 August 1897 (aged 62); Chartham, Kent

Domestic team information
- Years: Team
- 1860: Kent

Career statistics
Competition	First-class
Matches	4
Runs scored	41
Batting average	6.83
100s/50s	0/0
Top score	14*
Balls bowled	24
Wickets	0
Bowling average	–
5 wickets in innings	–
10 wickets in match	–
Best bowling	–
Catches/stumpings	2/–
- Source: ESPNcricinfo, 5 May 2013

Alfred Gillow (2 May 1835 – 12 August 1897) was an English farmer and amateur cricketer. He was born at St Nicholas-at-Wade in Kent in 1835 and played in four important matches for Kent County Cricket Club and the Gentlemen of Kent amateurs in 1859 and 1860.

Gillow made his first-class debut against the Gentlemen of England at Lord's in 1859 before making three further first-class appearances in 1860, two for Kentand one for the Gentlemen of Kent. He was educated at The King's School, Canterbury and played local cricket for Sandwich Town Cricket Club. As well as his first-class appearances, Gillow played in a number of minor matches for the Gentlemen of Kent.

Gillow farmed at St Nicholas at Wade on the Isle of Thanet in Kent. He married Eliza Emmerson, granddaughter of Admiral Edward Harvey, in 1863; the couple had one daughter but Eliza had died by the 1871 census. Gillow died at Chartham in Kent in August 1897 aged 62.

== Bibliography ==
- Carlaw, Derek (2020). Kent County Cricketers, A to Z: Part One (1806–1914) (PDF). Cardiff: ACS.
