= Arthur Ceely =

English cricketer and soldier

Arthur James Ceely (14 October 1834 – 31 December 1866) was an English soldier and cricketer.

Ceely was born in Aylesbury, the son of James Ceely who was a Fellow of the Royal College of Surgeons. He attended Charterhouse School and, in 1854, went up to Gonville and Caius College at Cambridge University. Having played cricket at Charterhouse, he played for the Gentlemen of Kent and for Kent in 1854, before appearing in some minor matches for the university and his college in 1855. A document in the archives of Gonville and Caius describes him as a "brilliant cricketer", but he played only three matches which have been given first-class cricket status.

Ceely left the university after a year and enlisted in the British army. He was commissioned in the 42nd Highlanders and saw service during the Indian Rebellion of 1857. He was at the Siege of Lucknow and at the Capture of Bareilly and was awarded the Indian Mutiny Medal. He was promoted to Lieutenant in 1858.

Ceely died at sea on 31 December 1866 off the Point-de-Galle in what was then Ceylon whilst returning to England. He was 32 years old. His parents dedicated stained glass windows to his memory at St Mary the Virgin's Church, Aylesbury.

== Bibliography ==
- Carlaw, Derek (2020). Kent County Cricketers, A to Z: Part One (1806–1914) (PDF). Cardiff: ACS.
