= Bill Dyer (Australian footballer) =

Australian rules footballer, born 1917

Personal information
- Full name: William David Dyer
- Born: 15 March 1917; Geelong, Victoria
- Died: 7 January 1957 (aged 39); Heidelberg, Victoria
- Original team: Geelong District
- Height: 175 cm (5 ft 9 in)
- Weight: 69 kg (152 lb)

Playing career^{1}
Years	Club	Games (Goals)
1937–38	Geelong	19 (1)
1939	St Kilda	1 (0)
Total		20 (1)
- ^{1} Playing statistics correct to the end of 1939.

William David Dyer (15 March 1917 – 7 January 1957) was an Australian rules footballer who played with Geelong and St Kilda in the Victorian Football League (VFL).

== Family ==
The son of Charles Victor Dyer (1887–1959), and Alice May Dyer (1881–1970), née McHarry, William David Dyer was born at Geelong on 15 March 1917.

He married Leonora Lilian Partridge (1921–1972) in 1944.

== Military service ==
He enlisted in the Second AIF on 27 June 1940, and was discharged on 8 October 1945. He saw active service in the Middle East and in New Guinea.

== Death ==
He died at the Heidelberg Repatriation Hospital on 7 January 1957.
