= Edward Banks (cricketer) =

Welsh-born English cricketer

Edward Richard Rupert George Banks (12 August 1820 – 7 January 1910) was a Welsh-born English amateur cricketer who played first-class cricket for Kent County Cricket Club and the amateur Gentlemen of Kent teams in the 1840s.

Banks was born in Pembrey in Carmarthenshire in 1820 and moved to Kent as a child. His first known first-class match was the first fixture for the newly formed Kent County Cricket Club in 1842 and he went on to play intermittently for both the county and associated amateur teams through to 1847. He is known to have played in 17 first-class matches during his playing career which was limited by ill-health. His highest score of 30 was achieved for the Gentlemen of Kent in 1845 when he opened the batting with his younger brother, William.

Banks was particularly noted for his speed when running between the wickets and for his fielding. His Wisden obituary quoted from a contemporary, Fuller Pilch: "He and his youngest brother, Mr. William, were the quickest between the wickets I ever did see, and Mr. Edward was one of the smartest in the long-field. He was like a thorough-bred horse, for no matter how far the ball was off he would try; and when I sang out 'Go to her, Mr. Edward! Go to her!' he would outrun himself almost, and, as sure as ever he got his hands to her, the ball was like a rat in a trap."

Banks was the grandson of Sir Edward Banks, a civil engineer who built bridges at Southwark, Waterloo and Staines as well as the 19th century London Bridge and Heligoland Lighthouse. He lived at Sholden Lodge near Deal and was a Justice of the Peace for Kent. After retiring from cricket due to ill-health, Banks became a fuchsia grower, developing many modern varieties of the plant. He died in January 1910 aged 89.

== Bibliography ==
- Carlaw, Derek (2020). Kent County Cricketers, A to Z: Part One (1806–1914) (PDF). Cardiff: ACS.
