= William Fenn (cricketer) =

English cricketer

Personal information
- Full name: William Mason Fenn
- Born: 15 February 1828; Checkendon, Oxfordshire, England
- Died: 1 August 1886 (aged 58); Eton, Buckinghamshire, England
- Batting: Unknown
- Bowling: Unknown
- Relatives: Samuel Fenn (brother)

Domestic team information
- Years: Team
- 1848–1851: Cambridge University

Career statistics
Competition	First-class
Matches	12
Runs scored	113
Batting average	5.65
100s/50s	–/–
Top score	27
Balls bowled	?
Wickets	6
Bowling average	?
5 wickets in innings	–
10 wickets in match	–
Best bowling	3/?
Catches/stumpings	8/–
- Source: Cricinfo, 2 August 2020

William Mason Fenn (15 February 1828 – 1 August 1886) was an English first-class cricketer and cleric.

The son of the Reverend Joseph Fenn, the minister of Blackheath Park Chapel, he was born at Blackheath in February 1829. He was educated at Blackheath Proprietary School, before going up to Trinity College, Cambridge. While studying at Cambridge, he played first-class cricket for Cambridge University from 1848–1851, making nine appearances. In his nine matches for Cambridge, Fenn scored 82 runs with a high score of 27, in addition to taking wickets. In addition to playing for Cambridge, Fenn also made three first-class appearances for the Gentlemen of Kent from 1848 to 1853, scoring 31 runs with a high score of 14.

After graduating from Cambridge, Fenn took holy orders in the Church of England in 1856. His first ecclesiastical post was as curate of Upton cum Chalvey in Buckinghamshire from 1857 to 1858, before becoming the personal tutor to the sons of the Earl Fitzwilliam. He ceased to be employed by the Earl in 1864 when he became the rector at Tankersley, Yorkshire until 1886. Fenn is said to have declined an offer in 1885 to emigrate to Australia to become the Bishop of Brisbane. In 1885, he was employed by Eton College as a conduct master, while maintaining his rectorship at Tankersley. He died there in August 1886. His older brother Joseph was also a Church of England cleric, while his younger brother, Samuel, was also a first-class cricketer.
