= William Meyrick =

Welsh cricketer

William Meyrick (1808 – 17 February 1846) was a Welsh amateur cricketer who played first-class cricket from 1828 to 1837. He was called to the bar in 1835.

== Cricket career ==
Mainly associated with Cambridge University Cricket Club and Marylebone Cricket Club (MCC), Meyrick made 9 known appearances in first-class matches. He played for the Gentlemen in the 1837 Gentlemen v Players match.

Meyrick was a right-handed batsman. He made his name as a schoolboy player at Winchester in 1826 when he made a century against Harrow School and other good scores against Eton. Proceeding to Trinity College, Cambridge, in 1828, he was unable to recapture this form at Cambridge where he made just 135 runs in his 9 matches, including a highest score of 21.

== Bibliography ==
- Haygarth, Arthur (1996) [1862]. Scores & Biographies, Volume 1 (1744–1826). Kennington: Frederick Lillywhite. ISBN 978-19-00592-23-9.
- Haygarth, Arthur (1997) [1862]. Scores & Biographies, Volume 2 (1827–1840). Kennington: Frederick Lillywhite. ISBN 978-19-00592-23-9.
