= Robert Tayler (cricketer) =

English cricketer

Personal information
- Full name: Robert Frederick Tayler
- Born: 18 March 1836; Wendover, Buckinghamshire, England
- Died: 1 January 1888 (aged 51); Woking, Surrey, England
- Height: 5 ft 8 in (1.73 m)
- Batting: Right-handed

Domestic team information
- Years: Team
- 1865: Kent
- 1866: Hampshire

Career statistics
Competition	First-class
Matches	5
Runs scored	107
Batting average	10.70
100s/50s	0/0
Top score	42
Catches/stumpings	1/–
- Source: Cricinfo, 10 September 2023

Robert Frederick Tayler (17 March 1836 — 1 January 1888) was an English amateur first-class cricketer and Royal Marines officer.

The son of George Robert Tayler and his wife, Harriet, he was born in March 1836 at Wendover, Buckinghamshire. Tayler was commissioned into the Royal Marines as a second lieutenant in March 1854, before being promoted to first lieutenant in March 1855. A further promotion to captain followed in November 1864. Throughout his career as a Royal Marines, Tayler was mostly billeted at the Royal Marine Barracks at Chatham in Kent. This enabled him to make his debut in first-class cricket for the Gentlemen of Kent against the Gentlemen of Marylebone Cricket Club during the Canterbury Cricket Week of 1865. He followed this up by making two appearances for Kent in the same season, against Yorkshire at Gravesend and Sussex at Hastings. In 1866, he made two first-class appearances for Hampshire against Surrey at The Oval, and the Marylebone Cricket Club at Southampton. Presumably, he was billeted at Eastney Barracks in Portsmouth in 1866, which allowed him to play for Hampshire. Described by Haygarth as "a good and careful batsman", he scored 107 runs at an average of 10.70 in his five first-class matches, with a highest score of 42. He was noted to have scored over 1,200 runs in minor cricket matches, playing in services matches for the Royal Marines and the British Army cricket team. Prior to 1871, he in charge of a recruiting office in York. Tayler retired from active service in April 1875.

In retirement, he lived in Portsmouth and ran a postmasters business in partnership with a Benjamin Spittle; this partnership and the business were dissolved in September 1885. He died, unmarried, at Woking on New Year's Day in 1888, having suffered a cerebral thrombosis.
