= Joseph Makinson =

English cricketer

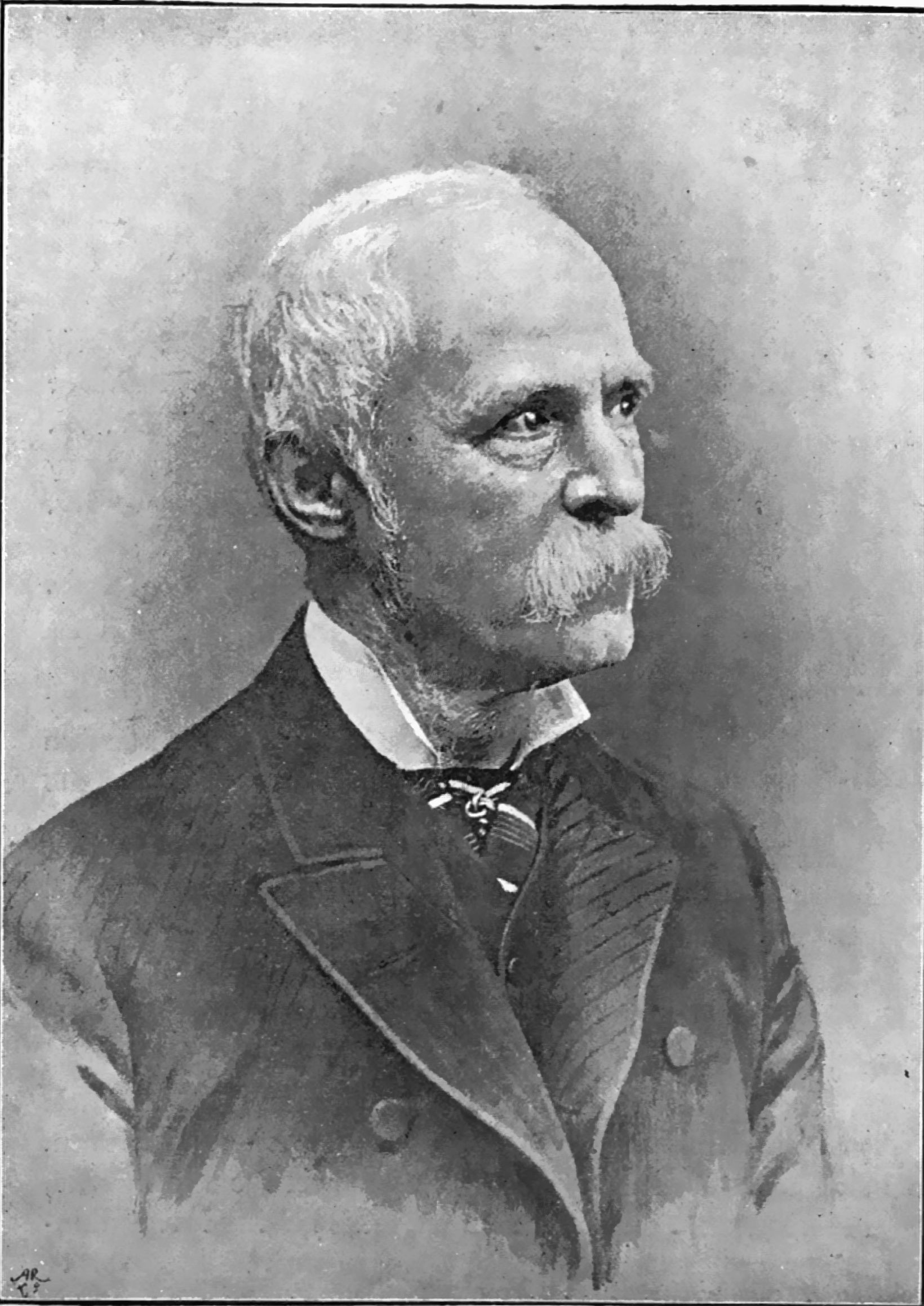
J. Makinson

Joseph Makinson (25 August 1836 at Higher Broughton, Salford, Lancashire – 14 March 1914 at Sale, Cheshire) was an English amateur cricketer who played from 1856 to 1873.

Joseph Makinson was educated at Huddersfield College, Owen's College, Manchester and Trinity College, Cambridge. A right-handed batsman, occasional wicket-keeper and right arm medium pace roundarm bowler who was mainly associated with Cambridge University and Lancashire, he made 27 known appearances. He played for the Gentlemen in the Gentlemen v Players series.

Makinson was called to the Bar from Lincoln's Inn in 1864, and practised on the Northern Circuit. From 1866 to 1878 he was Deputy Coroner for Manchester and from 1878 until his death in 1914 he was the Stipendiary Magistrate of Salford.
