= William Walton (cricketer, born 1799) =

English cricketer

Personal information
- Full name: William Henry Walton
- Born: 31 August 1799; Holborn, London
- Died: 23 November 1882 (aged 83); Surbiton, Surrey

Domestic team information
- Years: Team
- 1828: Kent

William Henry Walton (31 August 1799 – 23 November 1882) was an English cricketer. Walton's batting style is unknown. He was born at Holborn in London.

Walton made his debut for Kent against Surrey at Sevenoaks Vine in 1828. He was dismissed for 6 runs in Kent's first-innings of 177, though which bowler dismissed him is not recorded. Surrey made 66 in their first-innings, with Kent making 84 in their second-innings, with Walton scoring 13 runs before he was dismissed by William Mathews. Surrey were dismissed for 41 in their second-innings, to lose the match by 154 runs. He later made a second appearance for the Gentlemen of Kent against the Marylebone Cricket Club at the West Kent Cricket Club Ground in 1833. The Marylebone Cricket Club made 84 in their first-innings, while in the Gentlemen of Kent's first-innings of 117, Walton was run out for a duck. In response, the Marylebone Cricket Club could only manage to make 48, with Walton not being required to bat during the Gentlemen of Kent's second-innings, with them winning the match by 8 wickets.

He died at Surbiton, Surrey on 23 November 1882.

== Bibliography ==
- Carlaw, Derek (2020). Kent County Cricketers, A to Z: Part One (1806–1914) (PDF). Cardiff: ACS.
- Haygarth, Arthur (1997) [1862]. Scores & Biographies, Volume 2 (1827–1840). Kennington: Frederick Lillywhite. ISBN 978-19-00592-23-9.
