= Charles Jenner (cricketer) =

English cleric and cricketer

Charles Herbert Jenner (1809–1891) was an English Anglican cleric and a cricketer with amateur status.

== Life ==
Charles Jenner was born on 26 July 1809 in Westminster, London. He was the third son of Dr Herbert Jenner, and brother of Herbert Jenner and Henry Lascelles Jenner. He was educated at Eton College and Trinity Hall, Cambridge.

As a cricketer, Jenner was associated with Cambridge University and made his debut in 1828. He was ordained deacon in 1832, priest in 1833, and became rector of Merthyr Dyfan in 1834. He moved to become rector of Wenvoe in 1867. He died on 6 October 1891 in Wallington, Surrey.

== Bibliography ==
- Haygarth, Arthur (1862). Scores & Biographies, Volume 2 (1827–1840). Lillywhite.
