= James Dyer (cricketer) =

English cricketer

James Dyer (born 1809, England; died 24 November 1876, New Cross, Kent) was an English cricketer who was associated with Kent and made his debut in 1830.

== Bibliography ==
- Haygarth, Arthur (1862). Scores & Biographies, Volume 2 (1827–1840). Lillywhite.
