= Charlie Fellows (rugby union) =

English rugby union player

Charlie Fellows (born 26 April 1988 (age 36)) is an English rugby union player for Stourbridge in National League 1.

He plays on the wing. He previously played for Worcester Warriors.

He studied at King's School, Worcester.
