= William Dyer (cricketer) =

English cricketer

William Dyer (born c. 1805, England; died 17 June 1865, Kendal, Westmorland) was an English cricketer who was associated with Kent and made his debut in 1830.

== Bibliography ==
- Haygarth, Arthur (1862). Scores & Biographies, Volume 2 (1827–1840). Lillywhite.
