= Joseph Finch Fenn =

English clergyman

Joseph Finch Fenn (1819–1884) was an English clergyman, honorary canon of Gloucester.

== Life ==
He was the son of the Rev. Joseph Fenn, minister of Blackheath Park Chapel, Kent, and his wife Sarah Finch, born on 3 October 2019 in Travancore, India. His father was a missionary for the Church Missionary Society, as were his younger brothers Christopher Cyprian Fenn (Ceylon, died 1913) and David (Madras, died 1878); another brother, Thomas Ford Fenn (died 1883) was also in holy orders, and was the first headmaster of Trent College from 1868. When the Fenn family returned from India to the United Kingdom in 1827, there were six children.

Fenn was educated at Blackheath Proprietary School, and matriculated at Trinity College, Cambridge in 1838, where he graduated B.A. 1842, M.A. 1845, and B.D. 1877. He was ordained a deacon in 1845, and priest in the following year. In 1844 he had gained a fellowship of his college, which he held until 1847, when, on accepting the living at St Mary's church in Stotfold, Bedfordshire, he resigned. In 1860 he was appointed by the trustees to the perpetual curacy of Christ Church, Cheltenham, on the resignation of Archibald Boyd; in 1877 he became chaplain to the Bishop of Gloucester and Bristol, and in 1879 an honorary canon of Gloucester; and in 1880 he was elected one of the two proctors in convocation for the united diocese.

A prominent evangelical, as his father had been, Fenn kept clear of controversies in the Church of England, and was not partisan. He supported the Society for the Propagation of the Gospel as well as the Church Missionary Society, and had sympathy with the old High Church section. During later life he adhered to the cause of total abstinence.

Femn declined an offer of the benefice of St. Mary Redcliffe, Bristol, in 1877, bowing to the wishes of his Christ Church congregation. The church of St. Stephen, Tivoli, in the district of Christ Church, was erected mainly by his exertions to meet the need of an increasing population, and he contributed liberally himself.

Fenn died on 22 July 1884, and was buried in his family vault in the churchyard of Leckhampton, near Cheltenham. A large memorial brass wasnerected in Christ Church.

== Cricketer ==
An amateur cricketer, Fenn made a single appearance in first-class cricket for the Gentlemen of Kent against the Gentlemen of England at Lord's in 1851.

== Works ==
Fenn published The Principle and an Outline of the Method of Christian Dogmatics (1877). Some sermons, as Lenten Teachings, 1877–84, appeared in 1885, after his death.

== Family ==
Fenn was twice married, and left children. He married firstly, in 1848, Mary Jane Bignold (1822–1870), daughter of Samuel Bignold; they had a daughter and at least three sons. He married secondly, in 1873, Mina Frederica Shawe (1846–1886), daughter of Major Robert Shawe, and they had a son.
