= Charles Harenc =

English cricketer and lawyer

Personal information
- Full name: Charles Joseph Harenc
- Born: 3 August 1811; Foots Cray Place, Foots Cray, Kent
- Died: 14 December 1877 (aged 66); Bedford, Bedfordshire
- Batting: Right-handed
- Bowling: Right-arm fast underarm Right-arm slow roundarm
- Role: Bowler
- Relatives: Henry Harenc (brother); Edward Harenc (brother); Archibald Harenc (brother)

Domestic team information
- Years: Team
- 1830–1849: Gentlemen of Kent
- 1831–1838: Gentlemen
- 1832–1834: Oxford University
- 1834–1840: Kent (pre-county club)
- 1835–1848: MCC
- 1844–1848: Kent County Cricket Club

Charles Joseph Harenc (3 August 1811 – 14 December 1877) was an English lawyer and amateur cricketer in the mid-19th century. He played for the Gentlemen of Kent, the Kent County Cricket Club teams of the 1840s and for MCC as well as a number of other teams, and was regarded as the best Gentleman bowler of his era.

== Early life ==
Harenc was born in 1811 at Foots Cray in Kent, the second son of Benjamin Harenc who owned Foots Cray Place, an 18th-century neo-Palladian house built in the style of the Villa Rotunda which had been purchased by Charles' grandfather, also named Benjamin, in 1772. The Harenc family were originally Huguenot refugees from France and Harenc's grandfather established a silk mill at Foots Cray in 1775 and served as High Sheriff of Kent in 1777.

Harenc's father was an East India Company merchant and a keen cricketer, playing for Prince's Plain, a club which preceded the West Kent club; his mother Sophia was a member of the Berens family which was closely associated with cricket; his first cousins Richard and Henry Berens both played matches for the Gentlemen of Kent.

Charles was educated at Harrow School. He was a school monitor in his final year and played in the Harrow cricket team between 1826 and 1828, playing into two Eton v Harrow matches and captaining the team in his final year at school. From Harrow he went up to Christ Church, Oxford, matriculating in 1829 and graduating B.A. in 1833.

== Cricket career ==
Harenc is known to have played for the Gentlemen of Kent in non-matches as early as 1827, whilst he was still at school. He made his debut for the team in a match against MCC at Lord's in July 1830, going on to play for MCC in club matches later the same year. He played for the Gentlemen against the Players in 1831 and in two matches for Oxford University against MCC the following year.

Playing regularly throughout the 1830s and 1840s, Harenc made a total of 56 appearances, most frequently for the Gentlemen of Kent or Kent, both before and after the formation of the first Kent County Cricket Club in 1842. He played in seven Gentlemen v Players matches during the 1830s and made his final appearance in 1849. In club cricket he played regularly for MCC, Old Harrovians and I Zingari and was a member of the MCC Committee during the 1840s.

Harenc was a particularly successful bowler who was regarded as the best Gentleman bowler in the country during the early 1830s. He took at least 130 wickets (Note: During the time Harenc played, only dismissals where the batsman was bowled or out leg before wicket were credited to the bowler.) in his career, twice taking ten wickets in a match. In his youth, he bowled fast underarm deliveries, before converting to bowl slow roundarm later in his career.

== Later life ==
Professionally Harenc was a barrister. He was called to the bar at the Inner Temple in London in 1837. He married Ann Maria Powis at Cookham in Berkshire in 1868 and died in December 1877 at Bedford aged 66. Three of his brothers, Henry, Edward and Archibald, also played.

== Bibliography ==
- Birley, Derek (1999). A Social History of English Cricket. London: Aurum Press. ISBN 978-18-54107-10-7 – via Internet Archive.
- Carlaw, Derek (2020). Kent County Cricketers, A to Z: Part One (1806–1914) (PDF). Cardiff: ACS.
