= Percyvall Dyke =

English cricketer

Percyvall Hart Dyke (9 June 1799 – 12 November 1875) was an English amateur cricketer who played from 1822 to 1837. He was mainly associated with Kent and Marylebone Cricket Club (MCC), of which he was a member. He made 21 known appearances, including three for the Gentlemen.

== Bibliography ==
- Carlaw, Derek (2020). Kent County Cricketers, A to Z: Part One (1806–1914) (PDF). Cardiff: ACS.
- Haygarth, Arthur (1996) [1862]. Scores & Biographies, Volume 1 (1744–1826). Kennington: Frederick Lillywhite. ISBN 978-19-00592-23-9.
- Haygarth, Arthur (1997) [1862]. Scores & Biographies, Volume 2 (1827–1840). Kennington: Frederick Lillywhite. ISBN 978-19-00592-23-9.
