= Walter Fellows =

English cricketer

- Born: 23 February 1834; Richmansworth, Hertfordshire
- Died: 23 July 1902 (aged 68); Toorak, Victoria
- Occupations: amateur cricketer and clergyman

Walter Fellows (23 February 1834, in Rickmansworth, Hertfordshire – 23 July 1902, in Toorak, Melbourne) was an English amateur cricketer who later became a clergyman in Australia. He was the brother of Harvey Fellows, who also played.

== Cricket player ==
Walter Fellows was the seventh son of Thomas Fellows, of Moneyhill, Hertfordshire, and was educated at Westminster School and at Christ Church, Oxford.

He was an all-rounder who was first noted as a schoolboy cricketer at Westminster. He was mainly associated with Oxford University and Marylebone Cricket Club (MCC). He played for several predominantly amateur teams including the Gentlemen in the Gentlemen v Players series. He had a reputation as a "terrific and very successful hitter". Fellows' name has appeared in the "records" section of Wisden Cricketers' Almanack for many years under the heading "Record Hit" with the same wording: "The Rev. W. Fellows, while at practice on the Christ Church ground at Oxford in 1856, drove a ball bowled by Charles Rogers 175 yards from hit to pitch." A note reproduced in an Australian newspaper in 1890 states that Fellows at the time was 5 feet 11 inches tall and weighed 17 stones 4 pounds.

Fellows made 24 known appearances from 1853 to 1857. He played in the University match for Oxford University against Cambridge University as a lower middle-order batsman and a bowler for four years from 1854 to 1857, making important batting contributions in 1854, 1856 and 1857 and having some limited success as a bowler in 1855 and 1856; he appeared in the Gentlemen v Players matches at Lord's from 1855 to 1857.

== Later career ==
Fellows was ordained in 1858, and served as curate at Weedon and at Sidmouth, before he emigrated to Australia in 1863 to become the first vicar of St John's Church, Toorak. In Australia, he played for the Melbourne Cricket Club; a report in an Australian newspaper in 1878 indicates that Fellows was discouraged from playing in major matches by his bishop, Charles Perry, but that the retirement of Perry brought about a more permissive attitude from the new incumbent, James Moorhouse, and Fellows was able to resume.

He resigned his position due to ill health in 1900, and died at Toorak parsonage near Melbourne on 23 July 1902.

== Family ==
Fellows married, in 1862, Julia Packe, daughter of Rev. Christopher Packe, vicar of Ruislip.

== Sources ==
- Altham, H S (1962). A History of Cricket, Volume 1 (to 1914). George Allen & Unwin.
