= Alfred Payne (cricketer, born 1831) =

English cricketer

Alfred Payne (7 December 1831 – 25 June 1874) was an English amateur cricketer who played from 1852 to 1864. He was the twin brother of Arthur Payne.

Payne was a student at Trinity College, Oxford, matriculating in 1851 and graduating B.A. in 1856. He played mainly for Oxford University and Marylebone Cricket Club (MCC), he made 25 known appearances. He played six times for the Gentlemen in the Gentlemen v Players series.

Payne was a left arm fast bowler (LF) who bowled roundarm. He took 111 wickets at 12.19 with a best analysis of 7/42. He took five wickets in an innings 8 times and ten wickets in a match once.

After graduating at Oxford, Payne became a Church of England priest and was rector of Enville, Staffordshire, from 1869 until his death.
