= History of English amateur cricket =

Cricket, and hence English amateur cricket, probably began in England during the medieval period but the earliest known reference concerns the game being played c.1550 by children on a plot of land at the Royal Grammar School, Guildford, Surrey. It is generally believed that cricket was originally a children's game as it is not until the beginning of the 17th century that reports can be found of adult participation.

Originally, all cricketers were amateurs in the literal sense of the word. Village cricket developed through the 17th century and teams typically comprised players who were all resident in the same village or parish. There is no evidence of professionalism before the English Civil War or during the Commonwealth but legal cases of the period have shown that cricket was played jointly by gentry and workers.

== Amateur and professional cricketers ==
In the great upsurge of sport after the Restoration in 1660, cricket flourished because so many people had encountered it as children, especially at school. Although the sport was popular, its evolution into a major sport was accelerated by gambling because, along with horse racing and prizefighting, cricket soon attracted the attention of those who were seeking to make wagers.

To boost their chances of winning, some gamblers formed their own county-class teams such as Kent and Surrey who played each other in 1709. Patrons like Edwin Stead, the Duke of Richmond and Sir William Gage captained their teams and it was gentlemen like these, and the friends whom they invited to play, who began cricket's amateur tradition, while some players were paid a fee for taking part and this was the beginning of professionalism. Thus, Sussex of the 1720s might be captained by Richmond and include not only additional gentlemen like Gage but also professionals like Thomas Waymark; and this was the pattern of English teams for a period of 300 years from the 1660s to the 1960s. Waymark, for example, was employed by the Duke of Richmond as a groom and this became a common arrangement between patron and professional. Later in the 18th century, professionals like Edward "Lumpy" Stevens and John Minshull were employed by their patrons as gardeners or gamekeepers. But in the longer term, the professional became an employee of his club and the beginnings of this trend could be observed in the 1770s when Hambledon paid match fees to its players.

The original Lord's was opened in 1787 and was intended to be the private preserve of a gentlemen's club which soon reconstituted itself as Marylebone Cricket Club (MCC). Only a gentleman could become a member but the club from its very beginning employed or contracted professionals. Lord's immediately began to stage major matches and these attracted the crowds that some members had originally sought to avoid. MCC teams soon adopted the now age-old formula of "gentlemen" and "players" in the same team.

== Growth of cricket in the schools and universities ==
There are few 17th century references to cricket being played at or in the vicinity of schools, but the sport was played by pupils at Eton College and Winchester College by the time of the Commonwealth. There is a reference to the game at St Paul's School, London about 1665 concerning John Churchill, 1st Duke of Marlborough, who studied there.

In his Social History of English Cricket, Derek Birley comments that school cricket was "alive and well during the interregnum" (1649–1660) and speculates that the game "must have been known to every schoolboy in the south-east" of England. However, he doubts that the sport at this time was part of any school's curriculum. Apart from Eton and Westminster School, all schools in the 17th century had local intakes and no class segregation. Therefore, the sons of rich and poor families played together.

In 1706, William Goldwin (1682–1747) published his Musae Juveniles, which included a Latin poem called In Certamen Pilae (On a Ball Game). This has 95 lines and is about a rural cricket match. Goldwin himself attended Eton and then graduated to King's College, Cambridge in 1700. It is almost certain that he encountered cricket at both establishments. There is a reference to cricket at Cambridge University in 1710, while Samuel Johnson recorded that he played the game at Oxford University in 1729. In 1760, the Reverend James Woodforde played for "the Winchester against the Eaton (sic)" at Oxford.

Horace Walpole entered Eton in 1726 and later wrote that "playing cricket as well as thrashing bargemen was common". The Sackville family which produced the Dukes of Dorset, most notably the 3rd Duke, sent its sons to Westminster, the 1st Duke studying there at the end of the 17th century; and it was through playing cricket at school that the game became a Sackville family tradition.

The spread of cricket to the northern counties by 1750 was partly due to "its transmission by interested clergy, schoolmasters and others educated at southern boarding schools". In the middle part of the 18th century, games involving teams of alumni became popular. These fixtures ranged from a team of Old Etonians playing the Gentlemen of England in 1751 to a game at the newly opened Lord's Old Ground in 1788 which was entitled "Gentlemen Educated at Eton versus The Rest of the Schools". The first school cricket match which has been recorded was in 1794 between Westminster School and Charterhouse School with pupils playing as City of London and City of Westminster at Lords Old Ground. Westminster School played its games at Tothill Fields, which was where Vincent Square now stands. It is known to have played matches against Eton in 1792 and 1796.

Birley recorded that the "sharpest rivalry" in the middle to late 18th century was between old boys of Eton and Westminster, as these were the two oldest public schools. Notable cricketing patrons who attended those schools include the 3rd Duke of Dorset (Winchester), the 4th Earl of Tankerville and the 9th Earl of Winchilsea (both Eton). Their fellow patron Sir Horatio Mann attended Charterhouse School, an indication that cricket was gaining acceptance at many other schools. By 1800, it was firmly established in all public and most grammar schools.

The most important of these "many other schools" was Harrow, which would develop a great cricketing tradition during the 19th century and produce numerous quality players. Harrow had formerly been a grammar school but by the end of the 18th century it had become a public school. Cricket was welcomed at Harrow as elsewhere because it was seen as a useful method for keeping the boys occupied and out of mischief, this despite its strong gambling associations.

== Amateurism from 1805 to 1863 ==
=== Schools cricket from 1805 to 1863 ===
Eton and Harrow definitely played each other in 1805 and there is evidence suggesting a game in 1804, perhaps sooner. The 1805 Eton v Harrow game at Lord's seems to have been organised by the boys themselves, not by the schools, and Lord Byron, who played for Harrow, is believed to have hired the venue. These two schools eventually developed a fierce rivalry that has become the schools cricket equivalent of Cambridge v Oxford or Yorkshire v Lancashire, but they did not meet again until 1818 (twice) and 1822; after that, the fixture has occurred annually except for 1829–1831, 1856 and in wartime. James Pycroft in The Cricket Field commented on the betting at the 1825 game but, by 1833, the match had become a social highlight and The Times noted "upwards of thirty carriages containing ladies". Also by this time, the main public schools had grouped themselves into an elite circle and all other schools were decidedly viewed as second class by comparison. The elite were Charterhouse, Eton, Harrow, Rugby, Westminster and Winchester.

Among prominent amateurs of the Napoleonic period, E. H. Budd was an Etonian and William Ward was a Wykehamist (i.e., a Winchester pupil). Other noted "old boys" were Edward Grimston, Charles Harenc, Charles Wordsworth (all Harrow), John Kirwan, Herbert Jenner (both Eton) and William Meyrick (Winchester).

Ward's old school of Winchester was the main challenger to Eton and Harrow. Harrow v Winchester was first played in 1825 and Eton v Winchester in 1826. Winchester won both of those games convincingly. H. S. Altham records that "there was a great public school festival at Lord's until its demise in 1854" which involved Eton, Harrow and Winchester. Meanwhile, of 234 "blues" awarded by Cambridge and Oxford from 1827 to 1854, 140 went to pupils of these three schools.

According to Pycroft, Winchester had the best players in the 1820s and 1830s for, at Oxford, their former pupils challenged and defeated the rest of the university and they also won a match against the combined universities at Lord's. Six Wykehamists played in the inaugural varsity match in 1827 but the main participants in this were Charles Wordsworth of Harrow and Herbert Jenner of Eton. Charles Harenc of Harrow became the best amateur bowler of the 1830s. Notable Etonians of the time included Harvey Fellows and the fearsome pace bowler Walter Marcon.

The 1820s and 1830s saw the beginning of "Muscular Christianity" in the public schools. Dr Thomas Arnold at Rugby is often hailed as the "founder" of this movement but, in terms of cricket, it was at Winchester that the best effect was achieved, especially in their athletic approach to fielding. Although this was hyped as something new, there are plenty of references to outstanding athletic fielders in the 18th century such as Thomas Waymark, John Small, Tom Taylor and William Yalden.

The earliest references to cricket at Rugby School and Charterhouse date from the 1820s. Other schools that gained mention in the 19th century include Addiscombe Military Seminary, Cheltenham College, Clifton College, Malvern College, Marlborough College, Merchant Taylors' School, Repton School, Shrewsbury School, Tonbridge School, Uppingham School, Wellington and Whitgift School.

=== Gentlemen v. Players from 1806 to 1863 ===
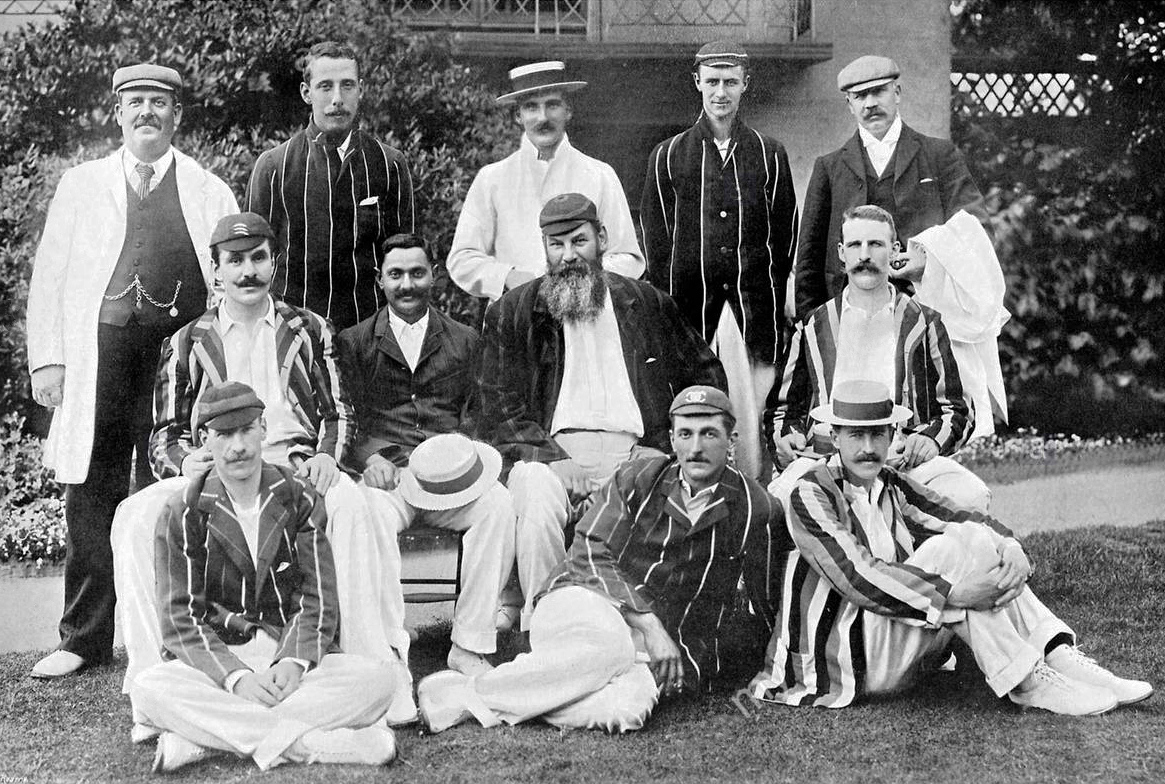
Gentlemen, captained by W. G. Grace, versus Players, Lord's 1899

The fixture that became the definitive expression of a cricketing class divide was first contested in 1806 when the two teams met twice. Even then, the amateurs realised they were at a real disadvantage and so their team in the inaugural match at Lord's included two of the greatest professional players, William Beldham and William Lambert as given men. Lambert made 57 out of 195 and, given the support he received from T. A. Smith, who scored 48, his contribution ensured that the Gentlemen won by an innings and 14 runs. The Gentlemen team was actually quite good as it also included Beauclerk, John Willes, Edward Bligh, George Leycester and Arthur Upton. In the second match, Beldham went back to the Players and only Lambert was a given man. Lambert again had an outstanding game and the Gentlemen won by 82 runs, though it was Beauclerk's first innings score of 58 from only 96 that was decisive.

The fixture was tried again in 1819 without much success and then, to quote Birley, it "struggled on". One of the least auspicious occasions was in 1821 when the Gentlemen "gave up" after they had scored only 60 and the Players had reached 270–6. Birley states that this was a Coronation Match to celebrate the accession of the much-maligned King George IV and that "it was a suitably murky affair!"

In 1822, the Gentlemen did manage to win on level terms thanks to their triumvirate of batsmen: Beauclerk, Budd and Ward. Budd scored 69 out of 138 in the first innings; Beauclerk and Ward built an unbeaten partnership in the second to secure the six wicket win; and really the Players were rather let down by their batting. Having good batsmen and ordinary bowlers was to become a Gentlemen tendency. The Players on the other hand were usually strong in bowling and generally good in batting.

From 1824 to 1837, the fixture was usually an odds match, the Gentlemen having as many as 18 in 1836. In two matches, the Players were handicapped by different stump lengths. In 1835, the Gents had Sam Redgate as a given man and he caused a stir by clean bowling Fuller Pilch twice for nought. In 1836, the great Alfred Mynn played for the Gents for the first time along with Alfred "Dandy" Lowth, another noted speed merchant even though he was still a 17-year-old Winchester school boy; his promising career was cut short due to failing eyesight.

By 1841, the fixture was in disrepute and MCC refused to organise it. It was only through the efforts of C. G. Taylor and the Hon. F. Ponsonby that the game could take place. They opened a subscription list to avert its collapse.

=== University cricket from 1827 to 1863 ===
The first University Match between Cambridge University and Oxford University took place at Lord's on 4 June 1827. The result was a draw. The captains were Charles Wordsworth (Oxford) and Herbert Jenner (Cambridge). It became an annual fixture in 1838.

Cambridge and Oxford were the only English universities until 1832, when Durham University was founded. This was followed by the University of London in 1836, as an examining board and degree awarding body for University College London (1826), King's College London (1829) and the various medical schools of the London hospitals. Cricket was played at Durham from at least 1842, with the earliest recorded home match at the Racecourse being in 1843, and Durham University Cricket Club was formally established in 1846. In London, the council of King's College voted £10 a year in 1862 to encourage cricket, but the lack of facilities meant this was unsuccessful; their first recorded matches were in 1881, including one against the Marylebone Cricket Club (MCC) at Tufnell Park. University College also attempted unsuccessfully to encourage sports in the 1860s, not firmly establishing a cricket team (which played on Regents Park) until the late 1880s. Colleges associated with the University of London were also established in Birmingham (Queen's College; 1843) and Manchester (Owens College; 1851); Queen's College is recorded as having played from at least 1863, while Owens College played from at least 1875 but did not have their own ground until 1880.

About the early days of Oxford and Cambridge university clubs, H. S. Altham (himself an Oxford "blue") states that OUCC played on "that part of Cowley Common that was called the Magdalen Ground, so-called because it had been appropriated by the Magdalen College Choir School, whose headmaster made it over" (to OUCC). Cowley Common is in fact some distance from the university itself and so "the cricketers used to enjoy a ride out across the fences!" OUCC moved to The Parks, its present venue, in 1881.

CUCC initially played at the University Ground, Barnwell, and in a large public area called Parker's Piece until they became tenants at Fenner's in 1846. The club secured the lease of Fenner's in 1873. Francis Fenner had been a bowler with the Cambridge Town Club (CTC) and had acquired his land in 1846, perhaps for the express purpose of leasing it to CUCC. CTC and the subsequent Cambridgeshire CCC also played on Parker's Piece.

Playing standards at the two main university clubs were ordinary until the 1860s. Altham admits that many CUCC and OUCC players were selected for the Gentlemen but points out that this owed "less to the strength of the universities than to the weakness of amateur cricket as a whole".

Noted CUCC players of the period include: C. G. Taylor; Robert Broughton, who was an outstanding cover point; George Boudier; Robert T. King, an all-rounder who had an outstanding season in 1849; Hon. F. Ponsonby; Joseph McCormick; Joseph Makinson, who played for Lancashire CCC; George Edward Cotterill; Herbert Marshall; Arthur Daniel; Hon. C. G. Lyttelton; Edward Sayres; John Kirwan; Edward Blore; Robert Lang.

Noted OUCC players of the period include: Hon. Robert Grimston; Villiers Smith; Charles Coleridge; Reginald Hankey; Charlton Lane; the twins Arthur and Alfred Payne; Walter Fellows; Richard Mitchell, an outstanding batsman at Oxford who went on to greater things as coach at Eton in the 1870s; Alfred Lowth; George B. Lee; Henry Moberly; Charles Willis; Gerald Yonge; C. D. B. Marsham.

=== The All-England Eleven ===
In the middle of the 19th century, William Clarke's All-England Eleven (AEE) was a highly successful all-professional venture which did much to popularise the game. The earliest overseas tours were also all-professional affairs. It was not long before amateurs became involved in the AEE.

== See also ==
- Amateur status in first-class cricket
- Gentlemen v Players
- Yorkshire captaincy affair of 1927

== Citation sources ==
- Altham, H. S. (1962). A History of Cricket, Volume 1 (to 1914). George Allen & Unwin.
- Birley, Derek (1999). A Social History of English Cricket. Aurum.
- Bowen, Rowland (1970). Cricket: A History of its Growth and Development. Eyre & Spottiswoode.
- Gibson, Alan (1989). The Cricket Captains of England. The Pavilion Library. ISBN 1-85145-390-3.
- Haygarth, Arthur (1862). Scores & Biographies, Volume 1 (1744–1826). Lillywhite.
- Major, John (2007). More Than a Game. HarperCollins. ISBN 978-0-00-718364-7.
- Marshall, John (1961). The Duke Who Was Cricket. Frederick Miller Ltd.
- Underdown, David (2000). Start of Play. Allen Lane.
- Waghorn, H. T. (1906). The Dawn of Cricket. Electric Press.
