= Harvey Fellows =

English cricketer

Harvey Winson Fellows (11 April 1826 in Rickmansworth, Hertfordshire – 13 January 1907 in Rickmansworth) was an English amateur cricketer. He was the brother of Walter Fellows.

== Career ==
Fellows was a right-handed batsman and a roundarm right arm fast bowler. WG Grace said that "Harvey W Fellows and W Marcon were two of the fastest and best...I do not think that Fellows or Marcon would now be allowed to bowl. Few people nowadays realise how fast they bowled." Having made his name as a schoolboy cricketer at Eton College, where he bowled in tandem with Walter Marcon in 1841 and 1842, Fellows was mainly associated with Marylebone Cricket Club (MCC). He played for several predominantly amateur teams, including I Zingari, and represented the Gentlemen in the Gentlemen v Players series.

Fellows was noted for his fearsome pace, especially on rough pitches. He is said to have reached his peak early and, after he changed his action by raising the height of his arm during delivery, he lost much of his speed and accuracy.

Fellows made 67 known appearances from 1847 to 1869. His known career bowling record includes a total of 169 wickets at an average of 7.66 with a best performance of 8 wickets in one innings. He is credited with ten wickets in a match on 7 occasions.

== Sources ==
- Altham, H S (1962). A History of Cricket, Volume 1 (to 1914). George Allen & Unwin.
- Birley, Derek (1999). A Social History of English Cricket. Aurum.
- Frith, David (1975). The Fast Men. TransWorld Publishing.
