= Herbert Jenner =

English barrister and cricketer

Herbert Jenner (23 February 1806 – 30 July 1904) was an English barrister. As an amateur cricketer he played from 1825 to 1838. He changed his name to Herbert Jenner-Fust in 1864.

== Life ==
Herbert Jenner was the eldest son of the judge Herbert Jenner-Fust, Dean of the Arches. He was educated at Eton College, where he was first noted as a schoolboy cricketer playing against Harrow School in 1822, and Trinity Hall, Cambridge. In 1827, he captained Cambridge University in the inaugural University Match at Lord's.

Jenner entered Lincoln's Inn, and was called to the bar in 1831. He became an advocate of Doctors' Commons in 1835.

== Cricket career ==
Jenner was an all-rounder who was right-handed as both batsman and bowler. He was an underarm bowler but his pace is unknown. He kept wicket when not bowling, and is said to have been one of the "finest amateur wicket-keepers".

In the 1820s, Jenner did not wear gloves or pads while keeping wicket. These protections were gradually introduced in response to the development of roundarm bowling from 1827. Until then, the role of the wicket-keeper had been "offensive" rather than "defensive", in that he was primarily concerned with looking for stumping chances, but the increased pace of roundarm forced wicket-keepers to improve their ability to stop the ball, and so prevent byes. By 1836, the Kent wicket-keeper Ned Wenman was using gloves, but it is not known if Jenner himself adopted them in the latter part of his career.

Jenner was associated with Cambridge University, Kent, and Marylebone Cricket Club (MCC). He played for several predominantly amateur teams including the Gentlemen in the Gentlemen v Players series. He made 36 known appearances in important matches from 1825 to 1838. He scored 842 runs with a highest score of 75. He is credited with 75 wickets, including a best performance of seven wickets in an innings; he took five wickets in an innings on at least five occasions. As a wicket-keeper, he took 24 catches and made 17 stumpings.

== Bibliography ==
- Altham, H. S.; Swanton, E. W. (1962). A History of Cricket, Volume 1 (to 1914) (5th ed.). London: George Allen & Unwin. OCLC 894274808.
- Birley, Derek (1999). A Social History of English Cricket. London: Aurum Press. ISBN 978-18-54107-10-7 – via Internet Archive.
- Carlaw, Derek (2020). Kent County Cricketers, A to Z: Part One (1806–1914) (PDF). Cardiff: ACS.
