= Canterbury Cricket Week =

Cricket festival week in England

Coordinates: 51°16′3″N 1°5′30″E

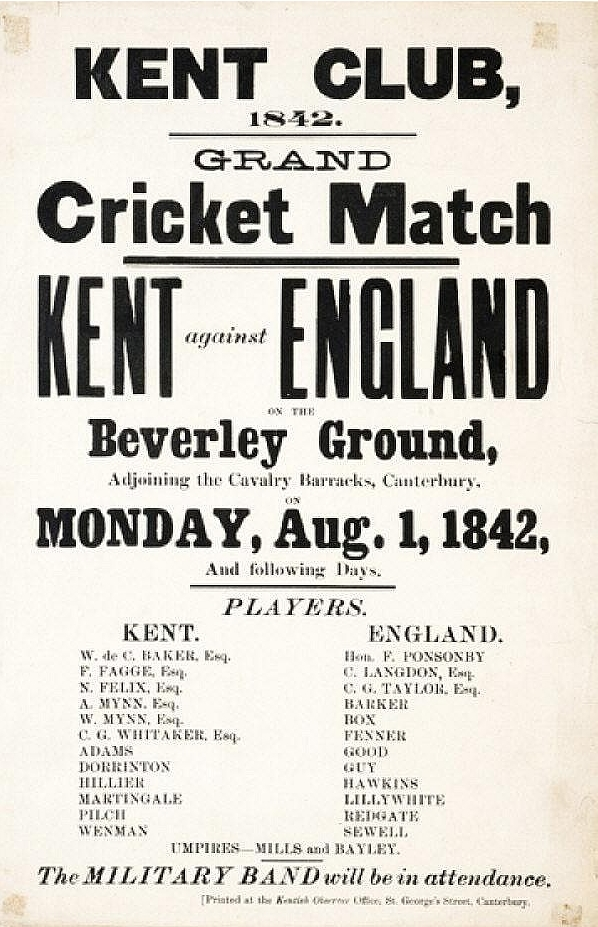
Poster for the Kent XI v England XI game that opened the 1842 Week.

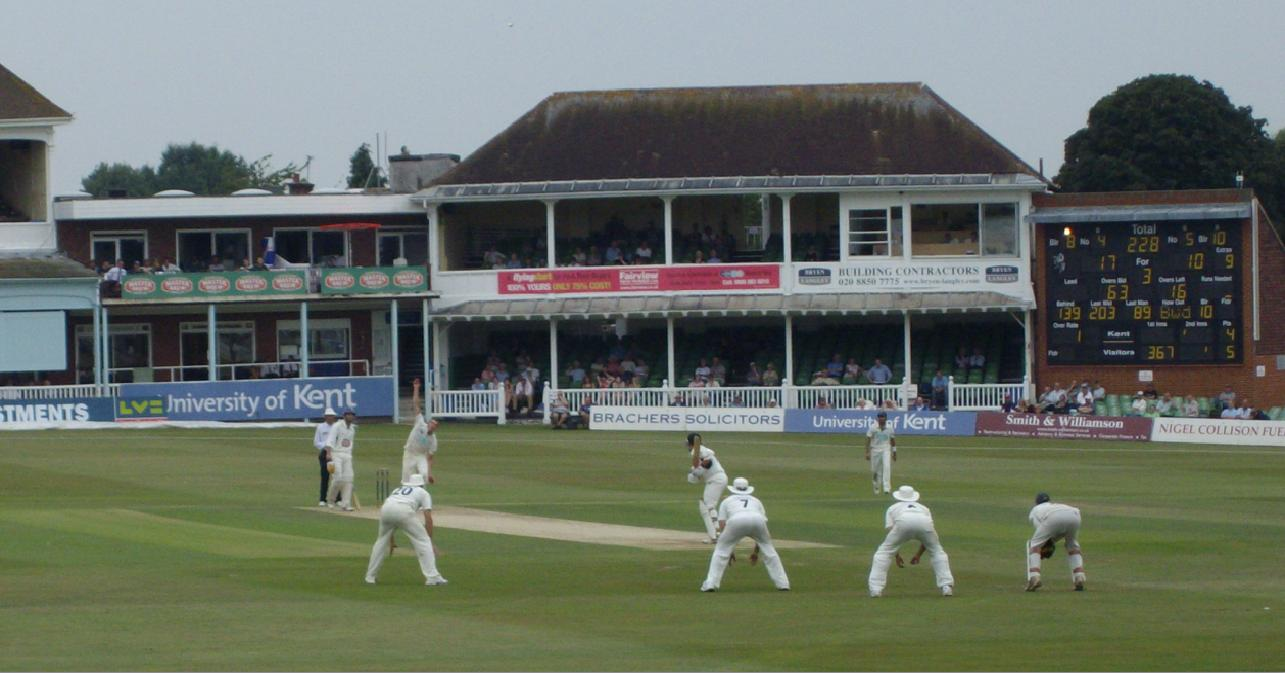
Kent v Hampshire in 2008 Cricket Week

Canterbury Cricket Week is the oldest cricket festival week in England and involves a series of consecutive Kent home matches, traditionally held in the first week in August. It was founded in 1842, although a similar festival week was first held in 1839 by the Beverley Cricket Club, the predecessor of Kent County Cricket Club. Since 1847 it has taken place at the St Lawrence Ground, Canterbury, before that it was held at the Beverley Ground in the same city. In addition to hosting cricket matches, it also includes several other events and ceremonies. As of 2018, there have been 167 Canterbury Cricket Weeks held. The week continued through the Second World War with cricket being held on the ground each season.

The politician and journalist Bill Deedes wrote in 2000: "while the Second World War was on, I consoled myself by thinking that Canterbury Cricket Week, founded in 1842 with its tents and famous lime tree, unchanging in a changing world, was the sort of thing I was in business to preserve."

== Traditions ==
Traditionally Canterbury Cricket Week included a Ladies Day, with prizes being awarded for the best hat on the day, though in recent years this has been discontinued in line with changing social attitudes and the need to keep cricket relevant to a modern audience. The Kent Supporters Club lays a wreath each year, commemorating those who played for the county and died during the First and Second World Wars.

The Old Stagers amateur theatre group has close links with Canterbury Cricket Week, originally being formed to perform at the festival.

== Impact ==
Canterbury Cricket Week usually has Kent's highest attendance at the St. Lawrence Ground. It was once considered a major commercial and cricketing highlight of the year. There were concerns that it could be eclipsed by the growth in popularity of Twenty20 but is still considered unique in cricket and is not expected to change.

== 2012 ==
In 2012, the 161st Canterbury Cricket Week was scheduled to clash with the second week of the 2012 Summer Olympics in London leading to fears of a reduced attendance at the Cricket Week. However, Kent Chief Executive Jamie Clifford stated that he believed that it would bring in larger crowds, mainly from people who didn't have tickets to the Olympics.

== See also ==
- Tunbridge Wells Cricket Week
