= Apollo University Lodge =

Masonic Lodge based at the University of Oxford

Logo of the Apollo University Lodge, Oxford, depicting the classical god Apollo.

Apollo University Lodge No 357 is a Masonic Lodge based at the University of Oxford aimed at past and present members of the university. It was consecrated in 1819, and its members have met continuously since then.

== University of Oxford ==
Membership of the lodge is restricted to those who have matriculated as members of the University of Oxford. The Lodge's historic records, from its foundation until 2005, are housed in the university's Bodleian Library. The lodge is primarily a part of university social life, but is also involved in other areas of university life through projects such as the Apollo Bursary, administered by the university, through which lodge members provide financial support to certain students.

Due to its association with the university it has had famous members such as Cecil Rhodes, Oscar Wilde, and Albert Edward, Prince of Wales.

To celebrate the bicentenary of the Lodge in 2019, a comprehensive history book was written. It was published in February 2019 by the Bodleian Library, Oxford. Entitled "Oxford Freemasons: A Social History of the Apollo University Lodge", the book is co-authored by Professor J. Mordaunt Crook, an architectural historian, former Slade Professor and Waynflete Lecturer at the University of Oxford, and former Public Orator and Professor of Architectural History at the University of London (who is not a Freemason), and Dr James Daniel, a Fellow of the Royal Historical Society, who has been a member of the Lodge for over fifty years, and is also a former Grand Secretary (chief executive) of the United Grand Lodge of England.

== Character ==
The Lodge (together with the parallel Isaac Newton University Lodge in Cambridge University) has traditionally enjoyed certain privileges, including the right to initiate matriculated members of the university regardless of their age (other Lodges in England and Wales are restricted to candidates aged 21 or older, except by special permission), and the right to initiate candidates in large groups (other lodges are restricted to a maximum of two candidates at a time, except by special permission). In 2005 the Universities Scheme was established, inspired by the long success of Apollo University Lodge and Isaac Newton University Lodge, and now brings similar privileges to more than eighty university masonic lodges in universities across England and Wales.

== Other lodges ==
Apollo University Lodge is the principal masonic lodge for members of the University of Oxford. Other Oxford University lodges include Churchill Lodge No 478 (consecrated 1841) for senior members of the university, St Mary Magdalen Lodge No 1523 (consecrated 1875) for members of Magdalen College, Oxford, and Aedes Christi Lodge No 9304 (consecrated 1989) for members of Christ Church, Oxford. The Oxford and Cambridge University Lodge No 1118 (consecrated 1866) is a London-based lodge for members of both universities.

== Notable members ==
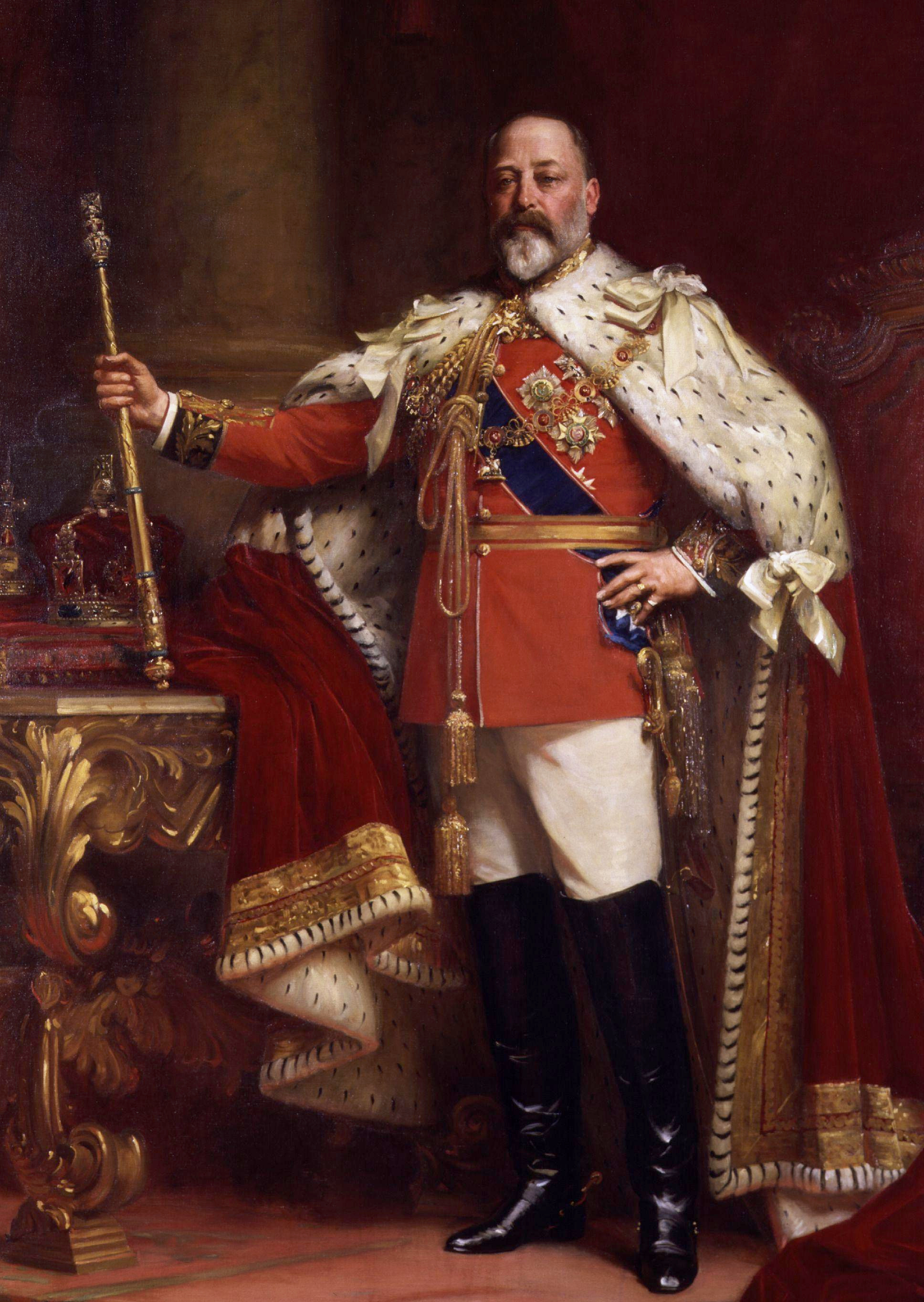
King Edward VII

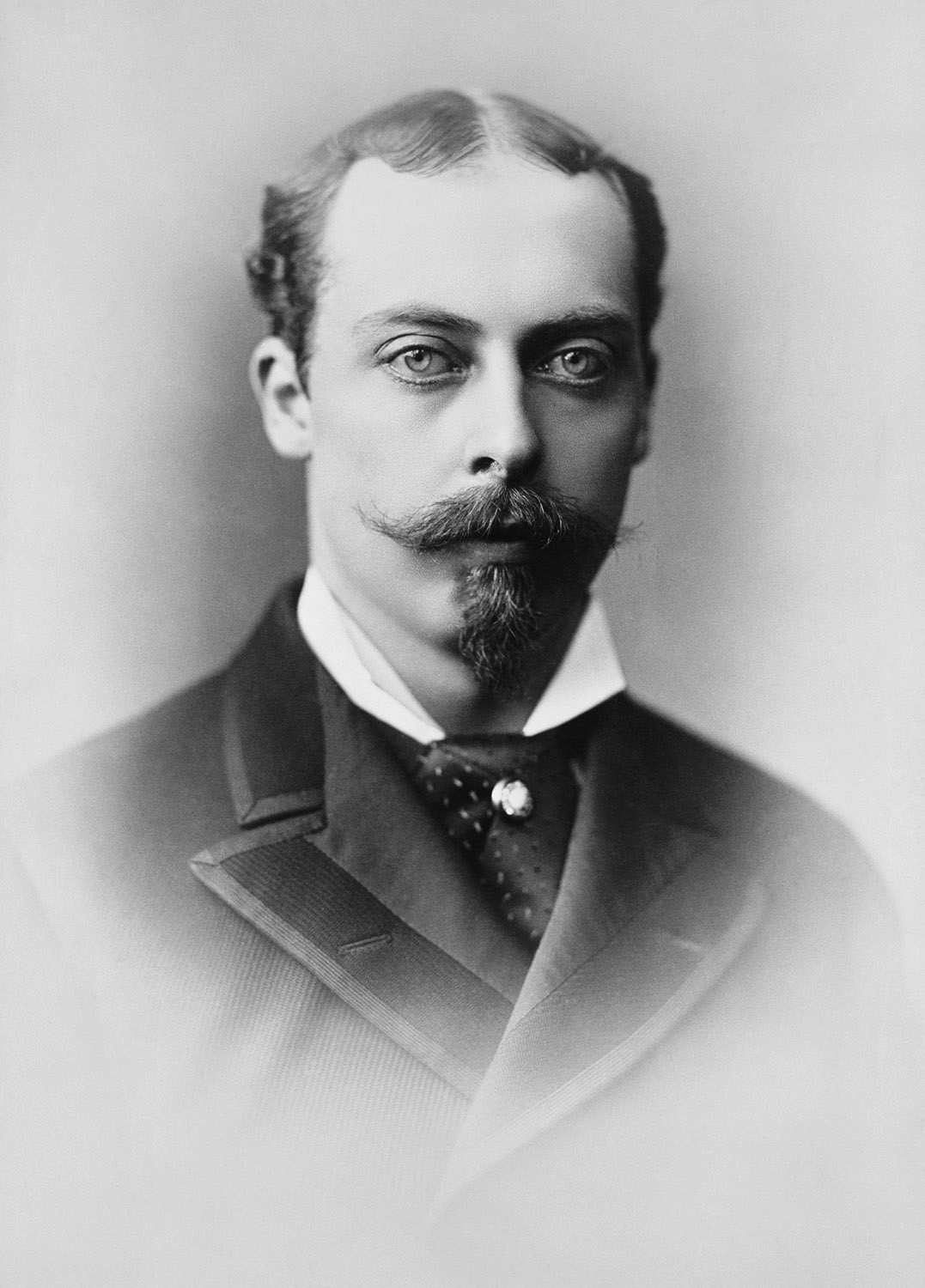
Prince Leopold, Duke of Albany

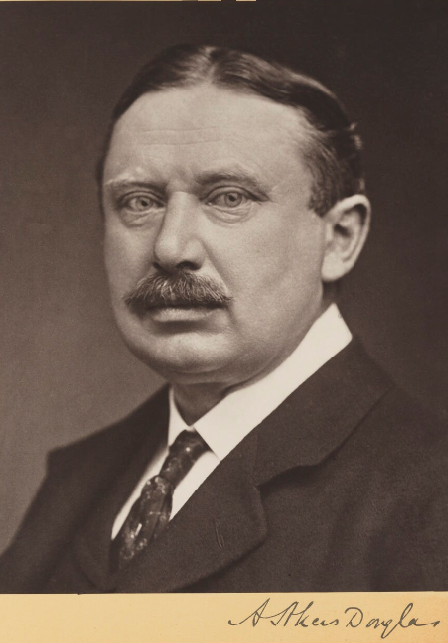
Aretas Akers-Douglas, 1st Viscount Chilston

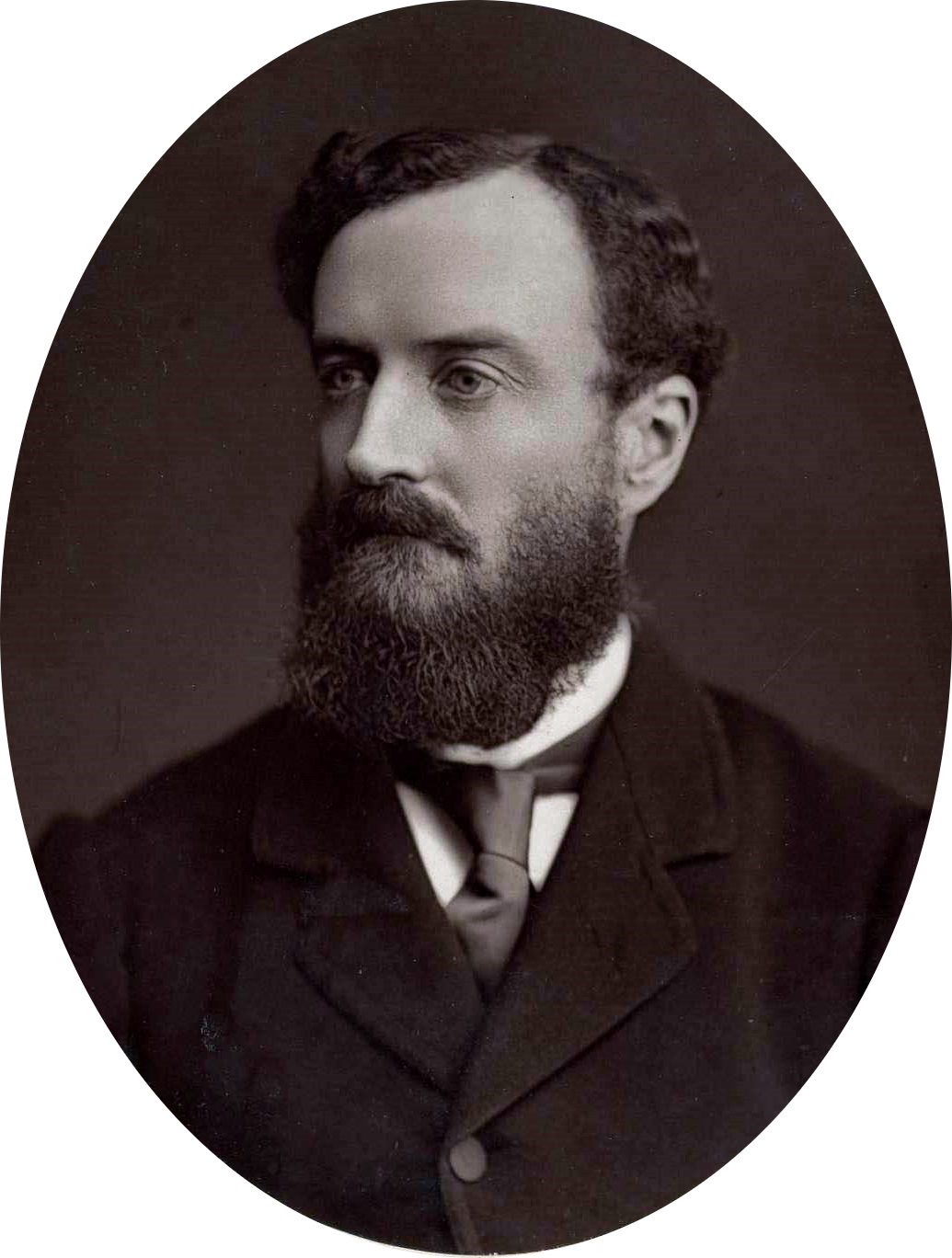
Michael Hicks Beach, 1st Earl St Aldwyn

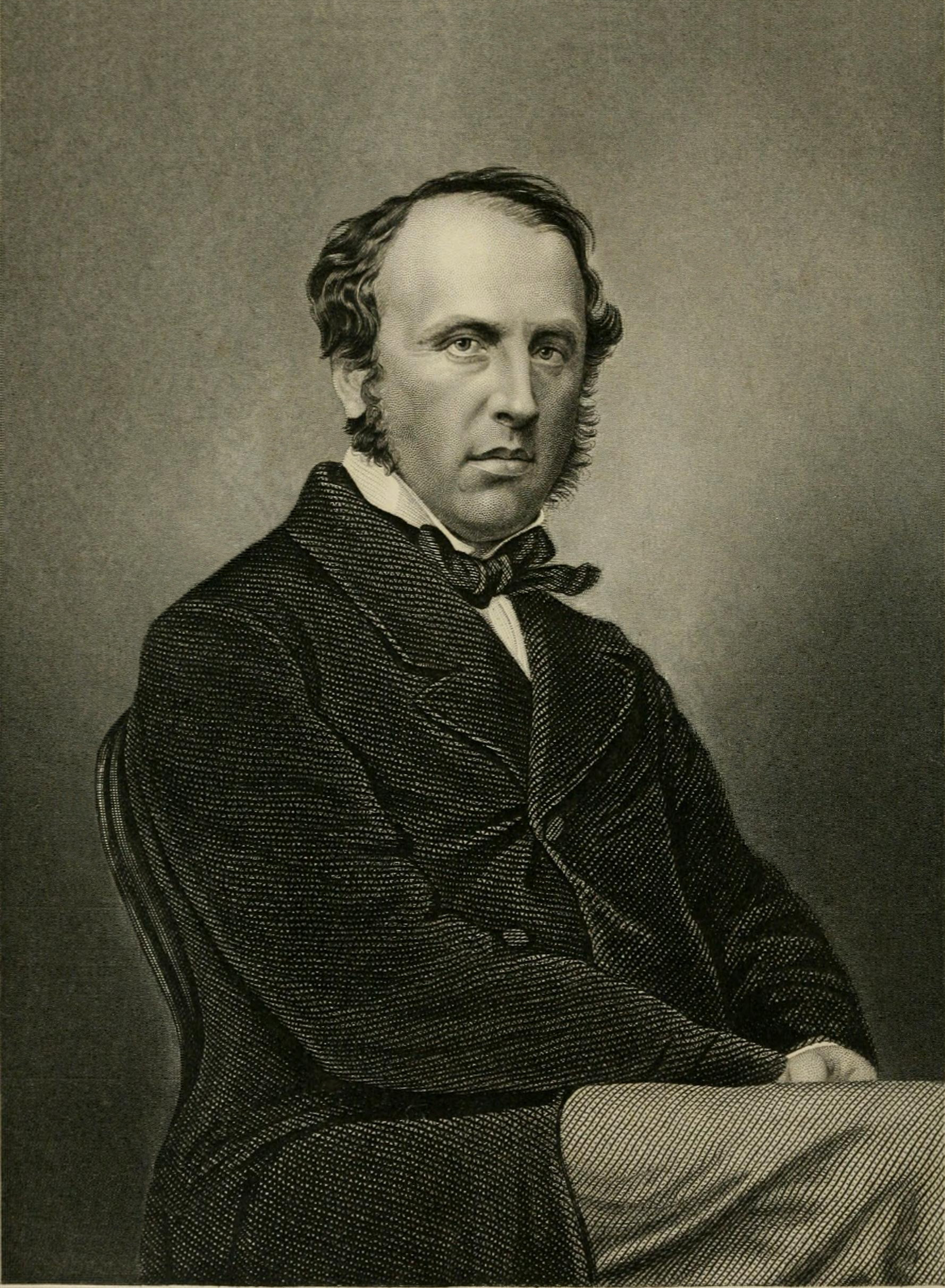
Charles Canning, 1st Earl Canning

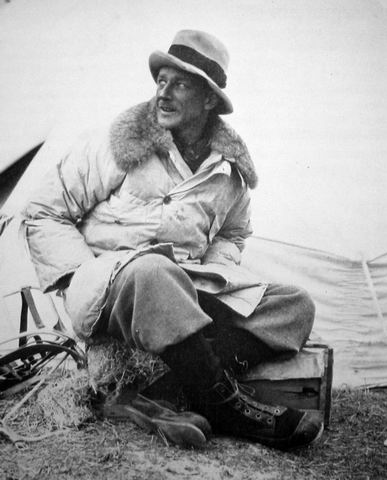
George Finch

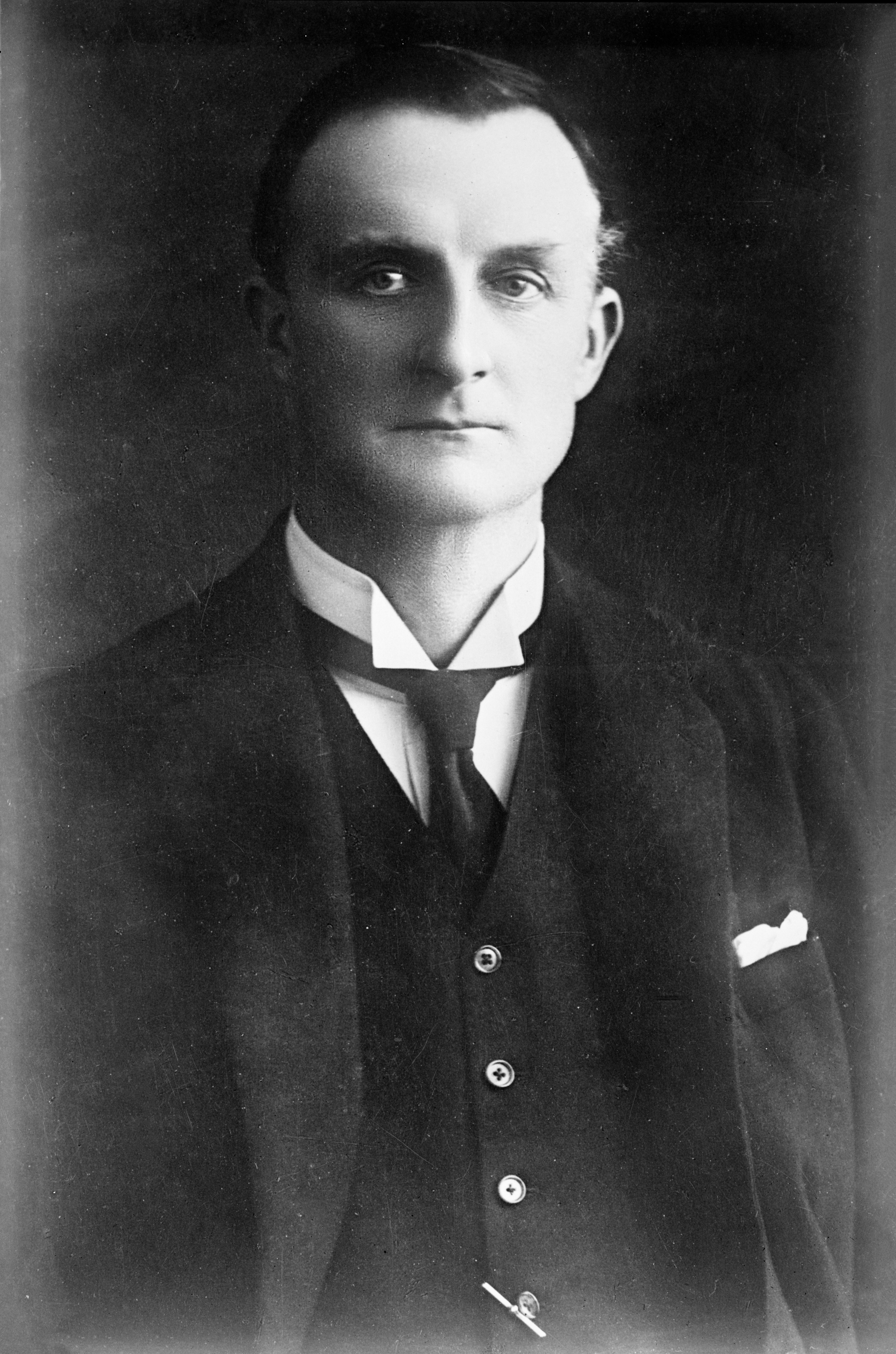
Edward Grey, 1st Viscount Grey of Fallodon

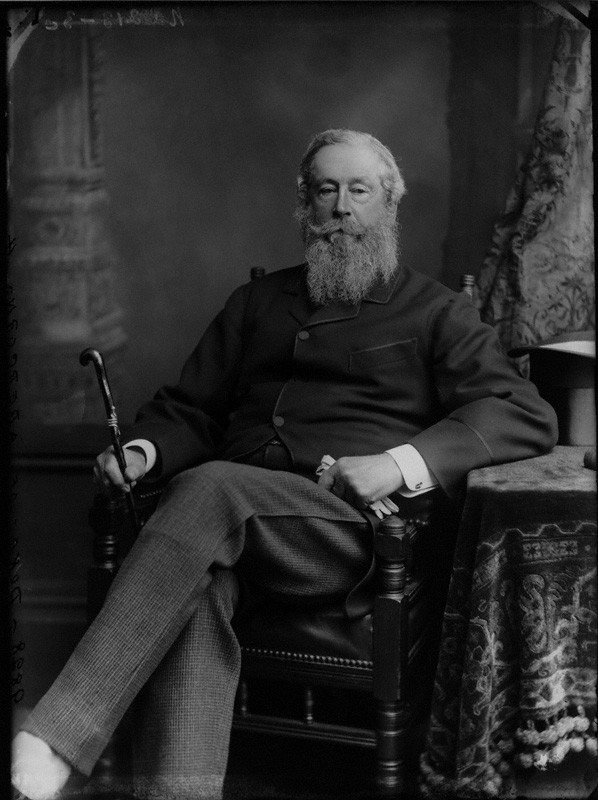
James Hamilton, 1st Duke of Abercorn

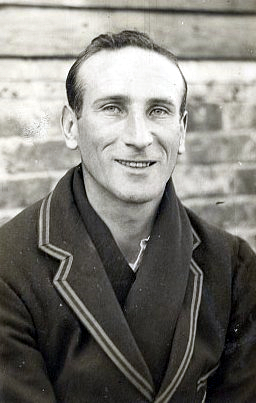
Douglas Jardine

George Ward Hunt

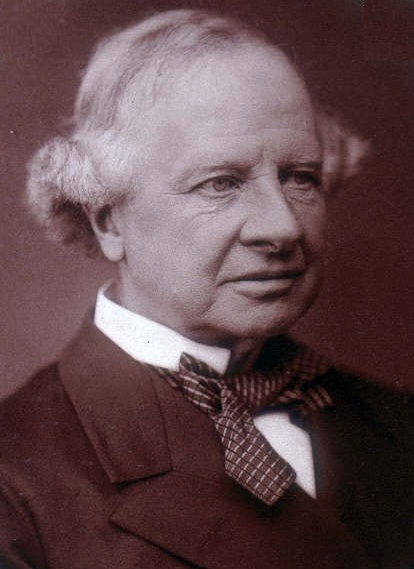
Granville Leveson-Gower, 2nd Earl Granville

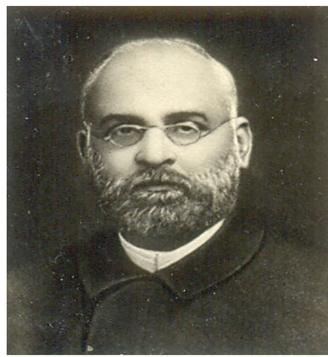
Shyamji Krishna Varma

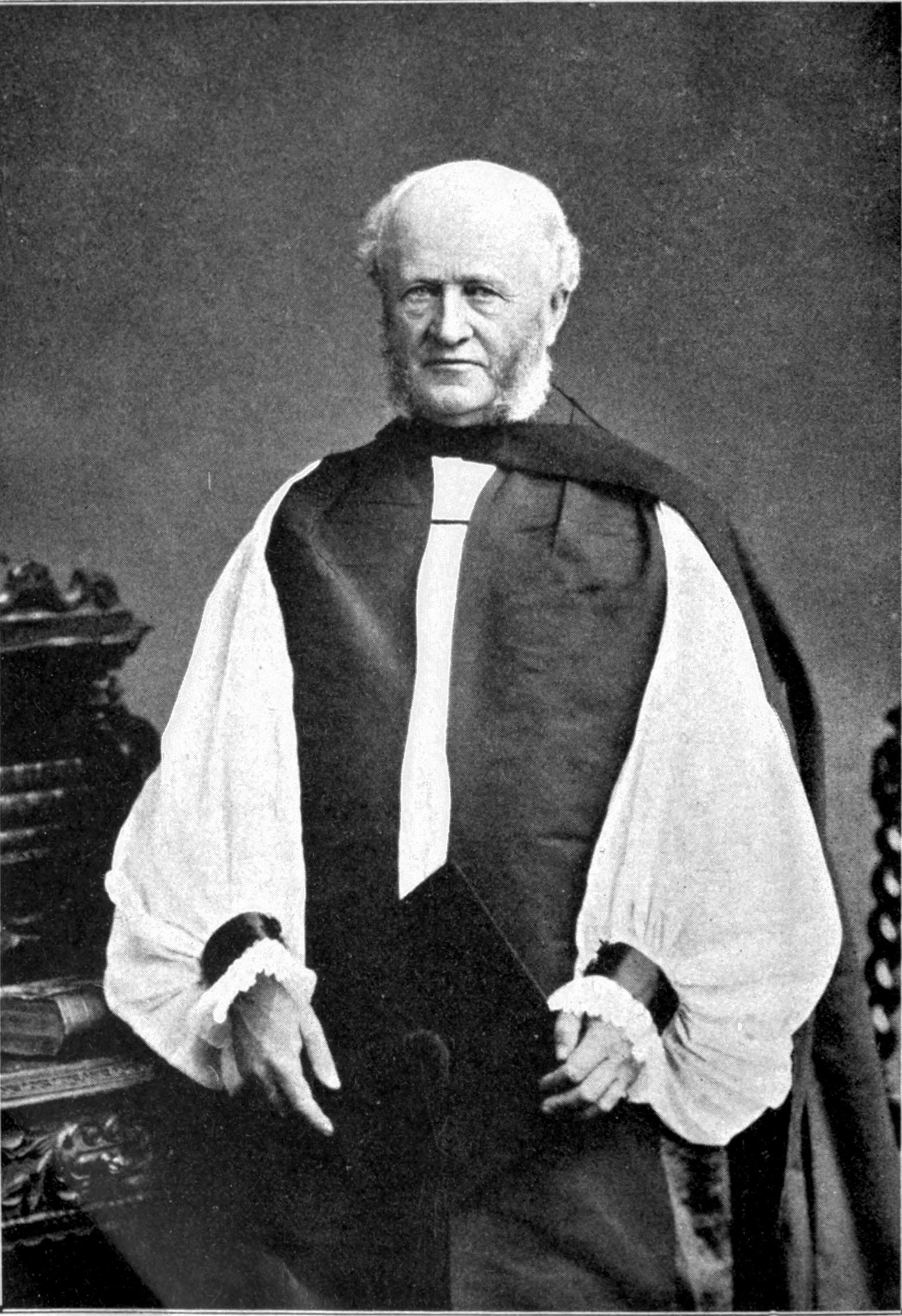
Richard Lewis, Bishop of Llandaff

Robert Lowe, 1st Viscount Sherbrooke

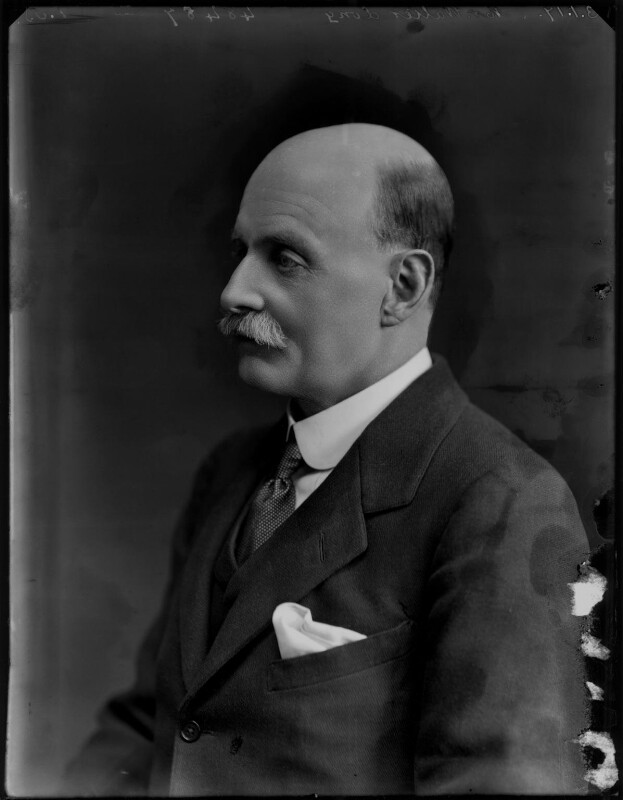
Walter Long, 1st Viscount Long

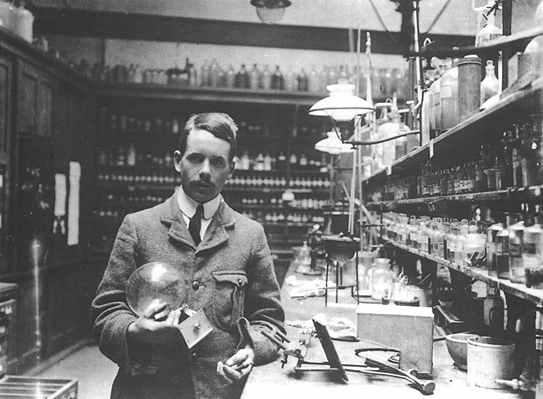
Henry Moseley

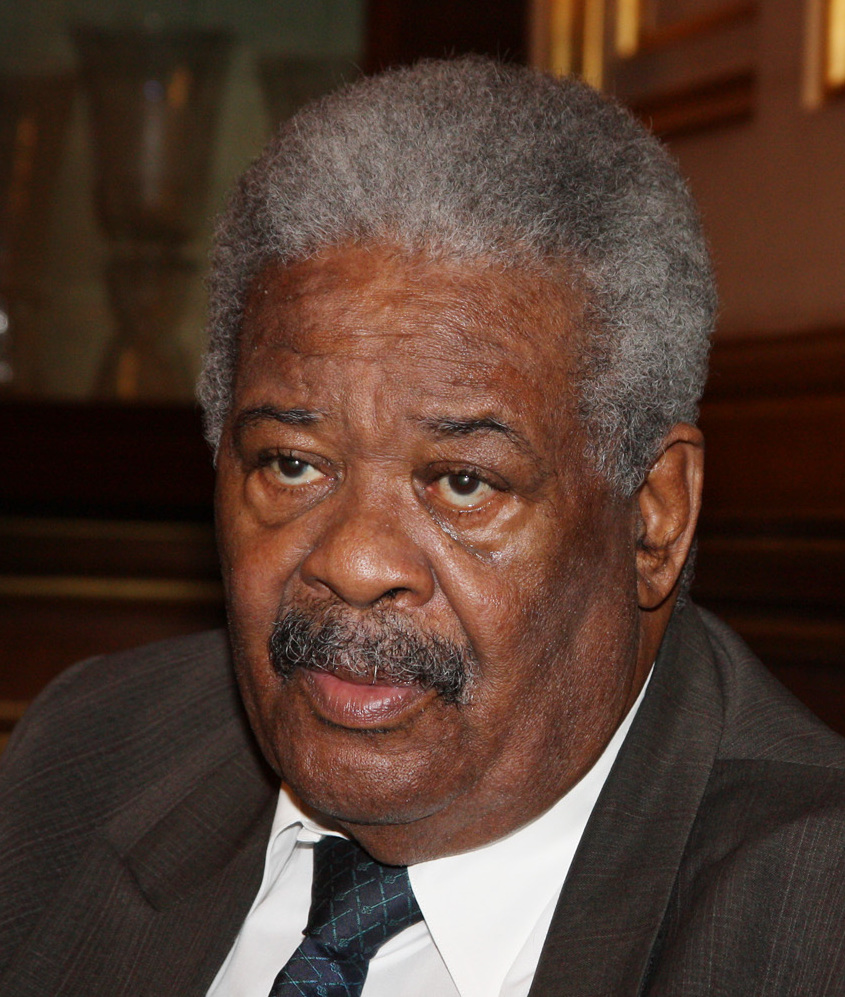
Ralph T. O'Neal

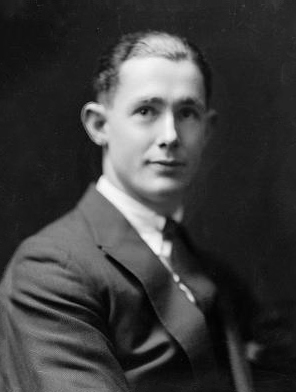
Arthur Porritt, Baron Porritt

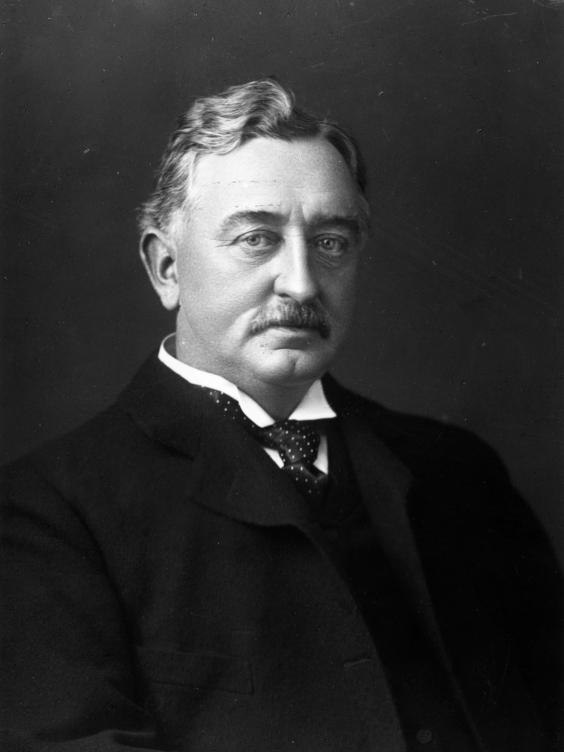
Cecil Rhodes

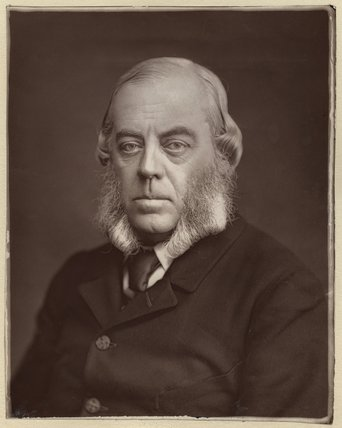
John Spencer-Churchill, 7th Duke of Marlborough

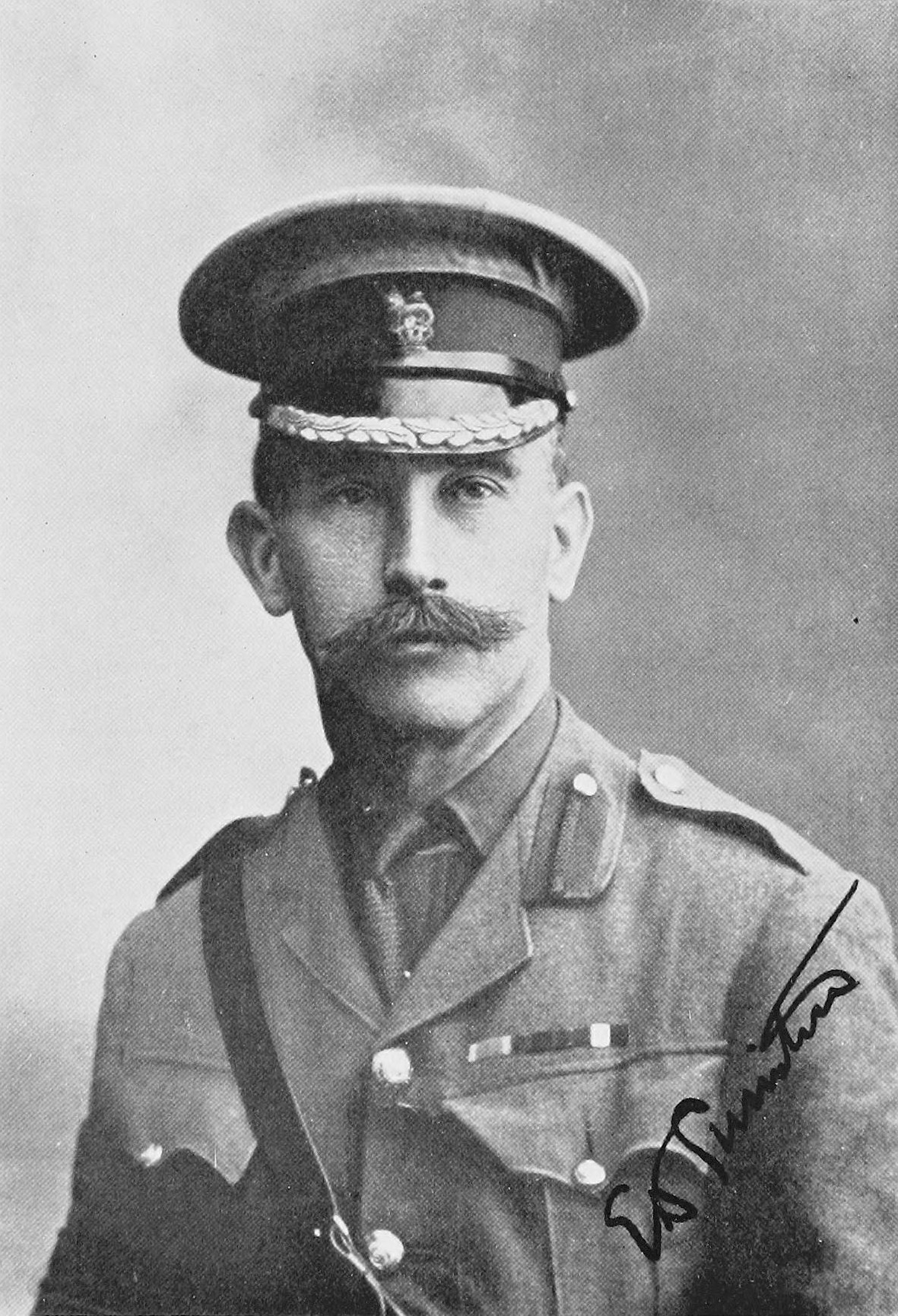
Major-General Sir Ernest Swinton

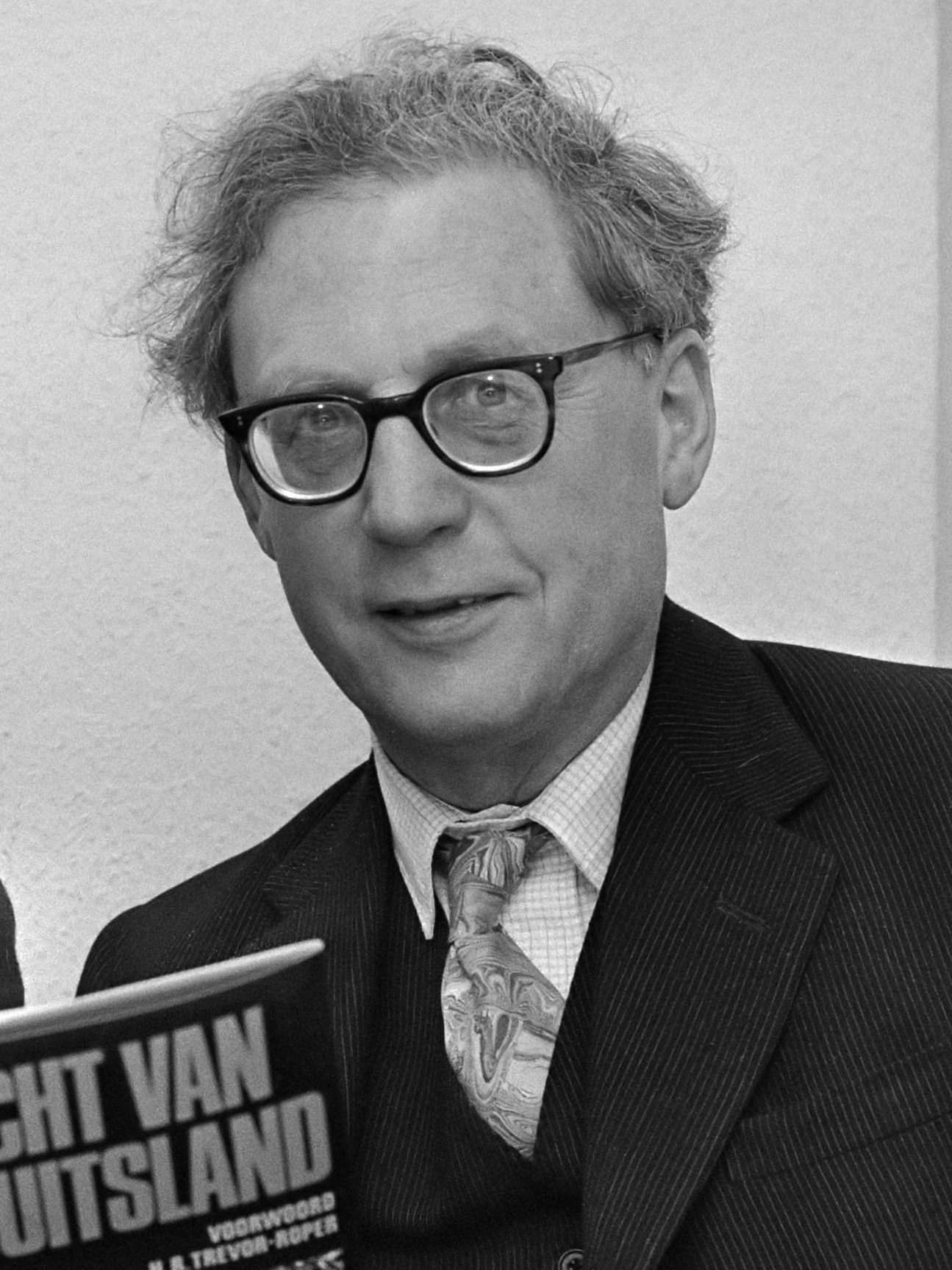
Hugh Trevor-Roper, Baron Dacre of Glanton

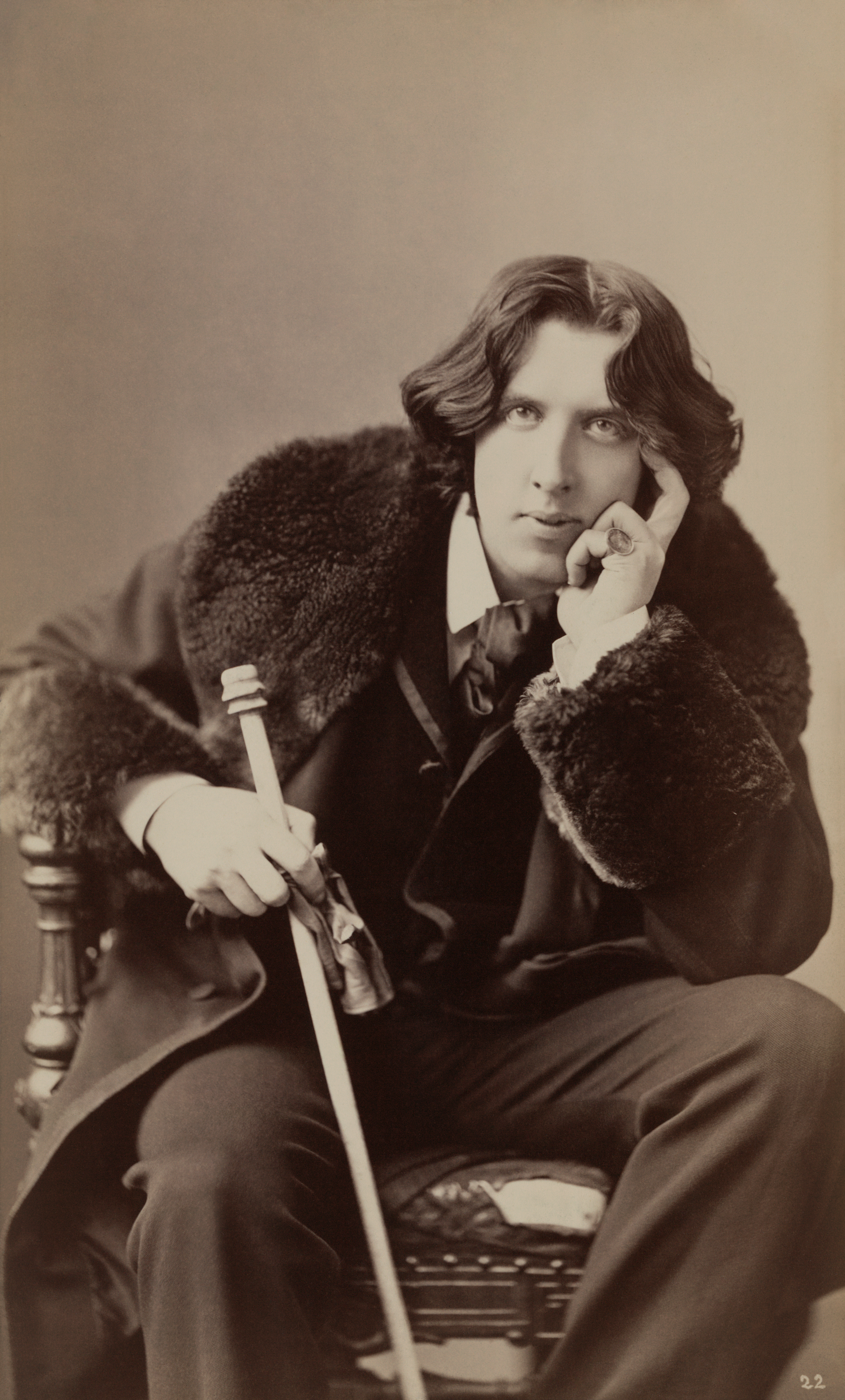
Oscar Wilde

- Albert Edward, Prince of Wales, later King Edward VII
- Sir Thomas Dyke Acland, 11th Baronet, educational reformer and politician
- Richard Acland, Labour politician and founder of the Campaign for Nuclear Disarmament
- Herbert Alleyne, footballer
- William Anstruther-Gray, Baron Kilmany, Unionist politician
- Aretas Akers-Douglas, 1st Viscount Chilston, Conservative Home Secretary
- John Hungerford Arkwright, Lord Lieutenant of Herefordshire
- Josceline Amherst, member of the first Western Australian Legislative Council under responsible government, barrister, and cricketer
- Anthony Ashley-Cooper, 7th Earl of Shaftesbury, philanthropist and social reformer
- George Askwith, 1st Baron Askwith, barrister and civil servant
- Joseph Bailey, 1st Baron Glanusk, Conservative politician
- Jonathan Baker, Anglican Bishop of Fulham
- Augustus Bampfylde, 2nd Baron Poltimore, Liberal politician
- George Bakhmeteff, Russia diplomat, and last tsarist Russian Ambassador to the United States
- Henry Barnes, 2nd Baron Gorell, British Army officer
- Evelyn Baring, 1st Baron Howick of Glendale, colonial governor of Southern Rhodesia and Kenya
- John Baring, 7th Baron Ashburton, chairman of BP
- Charles Barnett-Clarke, long serving Dean of Cape Town, South Africa
- Dunbar Barton, Irish Unionist politician, Solicitor-General for Ireland, and judge of the Queen's Bench Division of the High Court of Justice in Ireland
- Charles Bathurst, 1st Viscount Bledisloe, Governor-General of New Zealand
- Bramston Beach, Conservative politician and Father of the House
- Sir Michael Hicks Beach, 8th Baronet, Conservative politician
- Michael Hicks Beach, 1st Earl St Aldwyn, Conservative politician, Chancellor of the Exchequer, and Father of the House
- Tim Beaumont, Green politician and Anglican clergyman
- Merton Beckwith-Smith, soldier
- Frank Evers Beddard, zoologist and naturalist aboard the Challenger expedition
- William Kirkpatrick Riland Bedford, Anglican clergyman and antiquary
- Sir Henry Bellingham, 4th Baronet, Anglo-Irish Conservative politician
- Ralph Benson, cricketer and barrister
- James Theodore Bent, archaeologist and explorer
- Henry Beresford, 3rd Marquess of Waterford, Anglo-Irish peer and first to "Paint the Town Red"
- Seymour Berry, 2nd Viscount Camrose, newspaperman
- Sir Francis Blake, 1st Baronet, of Tillmouth Park, Liberal politician
- William Henry Bliss, scholar and convert to Roman Catholicism
- John Edward Courtenay Bodley, civil servant
- George Hawkesworth Bond, Conservative politician
- Edward Bootle-Wilbraham, 1st Earl of Lathom, Conservative politician and Lord Chamberlain
- William Copeland Borlase, Liberal politician and antiquarian
- Harold Boulton, songwriter and author of The Skye Boat Song
- Robin Bourne-Taylor, Olympic rower
- George Boscawen, 2nd Earl of Falmouth, Irish peer
- Courtenay Boyle, cricketer and civil servant
- William Brabazon, 11th Earl of Meath, Whig politician
- Henry Brassey, Liberal politician
- Thomas Brassey, 1st Earl Brassey, Governor of Victoria
- Lionel Brett, justice on the Supreme Court of Nigeria
- William Edward Briggs, Liberal politician
- Robert Barrett Browning, painter
- Alexander Bruce, 6th Lord Balfour of Burleigh, Scottish Unionist politician and Secretary for Scotland
- Edward George Bruton, architect
- Lloyd Bryce, American politician and diplomat
- Frederick Brymer, Archdeacon of Wells
- John Buchan, 2nd Baron Tweedsmuir, naturalist
- Theodore Alois Buckley, translator
- Stanley Buckmaster, 1st Viscount Buckmaster, Liberal politician and Lord Chancellor
- Thomas Lowndes Bullock, colonial administrator, orientalist, and Professor of Chinese at the University of Oxford
- Ulick de Burgh, 1st Marquess of Clanricarde, Whig politician and Captain of the Yeomen of the Guard
- William Burdett-Coutts, Conservative politician
- Peter Butler, Conservative politician
- Sir Edward Buxton, 2nd Baronet, Liberal politician
- Sir Robert Buxton, 3rd Baronet, Conservative politician
- Francis Byng, 5th Earl of Strafford, Chaplain to the Speaker of the House of Commons
- Harold Caccia, Baron Caccia, Permanent Under-Secretary of State for Foreign Affairs
- Charles Cadogan, 8th Earl Cadogan, peer and billionaire
- Frederick William Cadogan, Liberal politician
- Thomas Calley, soldier and Liberal Unionist politician
- Ian Campbell, 11th Duke of Argyll, Scottish peer and socialite
- Charles Canning, 1st Earl Canning, Governor-General of India
- Robert Carew, 2nd Baron Carew, Irish Whig politician
- Fairfax Cartwright, academic, soldier, and Conservative politician
- Lewis Cave, judge on the Queen's Bench
- Peter Cazalet, cricketer, jockey, and racehorse trainer
- Tankerville Chamberlayne, landowner and politician
- William Champneys, Anglican clergyman and author
- Hugo Charteris, 11th Earl of Wemyss, Conservative politician
- Charles Chetwynd-Talbot, 19th Earl of Shrewsbury, Conservative politician and Captain of the Honourable Corps of Gentlemen-at-Arms
- Victor Child Villiers, 7th Earl of Jersey, banker, Conservative politician, and Governor of New South Wales
- George Child Villiers, 8th Earl of Jersey, Conservative politician
- George Child Villiers, 9th Earl of Jersey, peer who donated Osterley Park to the National Trust
- Esmé Chinnery, cricketeer and aviator
- R. Clarke Cooper, American diplomat and 19th Assistant Secretary of State for Political-Military Affairs
- William Cholmondeley, 3rd Marquess of Cholmondeley, Conservative politician
- Lionel Cohen, Baron Cohen, High Court Judge
- Charles Cecil Cotes, Liberal politician
- Arthur Collins, courtier and Gentleman Usher
- William Costin, President of St John's College, Oxford
- Francis Cowper, 7th Earl Cowper, Lord Lieutenant of Ireland
- Charles Crosse, sportsman
- Albert Curtis Clark, Corpus Christi Professor of Latin
- Maxwell Close, Irish Conservative politician
- Robert Curzon, 14th Baron Zouche, traveller across the Near East
- Sir Jervoise Clarke-Jervoise, 2nd Baronet, Liberal politician
- Tubby Clayton, founder of Toc H
- Frederick Coleridge, cricketer
- John Stanhope Collings-Wells VC, soldier
- Sir John Conroy, 3rd Baronet, Analytical chemist
- St Vincent Cotton, gambler, sportsman, socialite, and soldier
- Arthur Cowley, Bodley's Librarian
- Francis Cowper, 7th Earl Cowper, Liberal politician and Lord Lieutenant of Ireland
- William Craven, 2nd Earl of Craven, peer
- William Crofts, rower and schoolmaster
- John Crichton, 4th Earl Erne, Conservative politician
- Wilfred Joseph Cripps, antiquarian
- George Bernard Cronshaw, Principal of St Edmund Hall, Oxford
- Harry Crookshank, Conservative politician and Minister for Health
- Bargrave Deane, Justice of the High Court
- Maurice de Bunsen, diplomat, British Envoy Extraordinary and Minister Plenipotentiary to Portugal, and Ambassador to Spain and Austria-Hungary
- Reginald De Koven, American composer and music critic
- William Des Vœux, colonial administrator, Governor of Hong Kong, Governor of Newfoundland, Governor of Fiji, High Commissioner for the Western Pacific, and Administrator of Saint Lucia
- Robert Dillon, 3rd Baron Clonbrock, peer
- Luke Dillon, 4th Baron Clonbrock, peer
- Douglas Dodds-Parker, Conservative politician and expert in irregular warfare
- Claude Gordon Douglas, physiologist
- George Douglas-Hamilton, 10th Earl of Selkirk, Conservative politician and First Lord of the Admiralty
- Cospatrick Douglas-Home, 11th Earl of Home. Scottish diplomat and nobleman
- Charles Duncombe, 2nd Earl of Feversham, Conservative politician and soldier
- David Dundas, Liberal politician and agricultural improver
- Hugh Alexander Dunn, Australian diplomat
- Jack Duppa-Miller GC, Royal Navy officer
- Frederick A. Eaton, writer and editor
- Herbert Edlmann, first-class cricketer
- Francis Egerton, 1st Earl of Ellesmere, Conservative politician, Chief Secretary for Ireland, and namesake for Ellesmere Island, Canada
- Piers Egerton-Warburton, Conservative politician
- Montague Eliot, 8th Earl of St Germans, peer
- William Ellison-Macartney, Governor of Tasmania and Western Australia
- Hugh Ellis-Nanney, Welsh landowner and magistrate
- Godfrey Elton, historian
- Stephen Elvey, organist and composer
- Walter Erskine, Earl of Mar and Kellie, peer
- Edward Estridge, cricketer
- William John Evelyn, Conservative politician
- Arthur Faber, cricketer
- Geoffrey Faber, publisher and poet
- George Fardell, Conservative politician
- John Fawcett, organist
- Sir James Fergusson, 6th Baronet, Conservative politician Governor-General of New Zealand and South Australia
- Sir Edmund Filmer, 8th Baronet, Conservative politician
- George Finch, chemist and mountaineer, the first man to climb over 8,000 meters
- Guy Finch-Hatton, 14th Earl of Winchilsea, peer
- Hayes Fisher, 1st Baron Downham, Conservative politician, Minister of Information and Chancellor of the Duchy of Lancaster
- Charles FitzGerald, 4th Duke of Leinster, peer
- Charles FitzRoy, 3rd Baron Southampton, peer
- William Fletcher, rugby union international
- Sir Henry Ralph Fletcher-Vane, 4th Baronet, peer
- Adrian Flook, Conservative politician
- Sir Samuel Fludyer, 3rd Baronet, peer
- Richard Fort, Liberal politician
- Hubert Freakes, South African rugby player
- Stephen Herbert Gatty, Chief Justice of Gibraltar
- Gerald Gardiner, Baron Gardiner, Labour politician and Lord Chancellor
- Richard Garth, Conservative politician and Chief Justice of the Calcutta High Court
- Alfred Gathorne-Hardy, Conservative politician
- Sir William Geary, 3rd Baronet, Conservative politician
- Alban Gibbs, 2nd Baron Aldenham, Conservative politician
- Philip Glazebrook, Conservative politician
- George Glyn, 2nd Baron Wolverton, Liberal politician and Paymaster General
- Lord Walter Gordon-Lennox, Treasurer of the Household
- Sir Edward Goschen, 1st Baronet, diplomat and British Ambassador to the German Empire, Austria-Hungary, Denmark, and Serbia
- Harry Graham, Conservative politician
- Sir Alexander Grant, 10th Baronet, historian and Principal of the University of Edinburgh
- William Grenfell, 1st Baron Desborough, sportsman, athlete, and politician
- Edward Grey, 1st Viscount Grey of Fallodon, Liberal politician and Secretary of State for Foreign Affairs
- Leslie Green, philosopher of law
- Archibald Grove, magazine editor and Liberal politician
- William Edward Gumbleton, horticulturist
- Alfred Gurney, clergyman and author
- Frederick William Hall, classicist and President of St John's College, Oxford
- Frederick Halsey, Conservative politician
- James Hamilton, 1st Duke of Abercorn, Conservative politician and Lord Lieutenant of Ireland
- James Hamilton, 2nd Duke of Abercorn, peer and socialite
- William Hamilton, 11th Duke of Hamilton, peer
- Walter Kerr Hamilton, Bishop of Salisbury
- Basil Hamilton-Temple-Blackwood, 4th Marquess of Dufferin and Ava, Conservative politician
- Stuart Hampson, chairman of John Lewis Partnership
- Charles Harbord, 5th Baron Suffield, Liberal politician
- William Harcourt, 2nd Viscount Harcourt, businessman
- Harold B. Hartley, physical chemist
- Charles Harris, Church of England Bishop of Gibraltar
- John Burland Harris-Burland, fantasy writer
- Edmund Samuel Hayes Irish Conservative politician
- Arthur Heath, industrialist, rugby international, and Conservative politician
- Roger Fleetwood-Hesketh, Conservative politician
- John Hely-Hutchinson, 5th Earl of Donoughmore, Irish peer
- John Hely-Hutchinson, 7th Earl of Donoughmore, Conservative politician
- Auberon Herbert, Liberal politician and theorist of Voluntaryism
- Henry Herbert, 4th Earl of Carnarvon, Conservative politician, Secretary of State for the Colonies, and Lord Lieutenant of Ireland
- Robert Hermon-Hodge, 1st Baron Wyfold, Conservative politician
- Edward Hewetson, cricketeer
- James Hewitt, 4th Viscount Lifford, Irish peer
- Henry Hoare, cricketer
- Bertram Maurice Hobby, English entomologist
- Samuel Reynolds Hole, Anglican clergyman and horticulturist
- Gordon Honeycombe, newscaster for ITN
- Sir Archibald Philip Hope, 17th Baronet, aviator
- John Hornsby, cricketer
- Henry Tufton, 1st Baron Hothfield, Liberal politician
- Henry Howard, 3rd Earl of Effingham, peer
- Egerton Hubbard, 2nd Baron Addington, Conservative politician
- George Ward Hunt, Conservative politician and Chancellor of the Exchequer
- William Bairstow Ingham, colonist of the Herbert River region of Queensland
- Harry Irving, chemist
- Thomas Graham Jackson, architect
- Walter James, 1st Baron Northbourne, Conservative politician
- Douglas Jardine, captain of the England cricket team
- Sir Frederick Johnstone, 7th Baronet, Conservative politician
- Sir Frederick Johnstone, 8th Baronet, Conservative politician
- Neville Jodrell, Conservative politician
- Sir Love Jones-Parry, 1st Baronet, founder of Y Wladfa
- Edmund Hegan Kennard, Conservative politician
- Anthony Kershaw, Conservative politician
- Seymour King, banker, mountaineer, and Conservative politician
- Henry Kingsley, novelist
- Thomas Kilner, plastic surgeon
- John Knapp, cricketer
- Edward Knatchbull-Hugessen, 2nd Baron Brabourne, Liberal politician
- Herbert Knatchbull-Hugessen, Conservative politician
- Geoffrey Hugo Lampe, theologian
- Osbert Lancaster, cartoonist
- Lambert Blackwell Larking, antiquarian
- George William Latham, Liberal politician
- Prince Leopold, Duke of Albany, youngest son of Queen Victoria
- Sir Edmund Lechmere, 3rd Baronet, Conservative politician
- George Legh, Conservative politician
- Thomas Legh, 2nd Baron Newton, Conservative politician and Paymaster General
- Francis Leighton, Warden of All Souls College, Oxford
- Sir Baldwyn Leighton, 8th Baronet, Conservative politician
- Alan Lennox-Boyd, 1st Viscount Boyd of Merton, Conservative politician and Secretary of State for the Colonies
- Granville Leveson-Gower, 2nd Earl Granville, Liberal politician and Secretary of State for Foreign Affairs
- Thomas Levett-Prinsep, landowner in Derbyshire and Staffordshire
- Richard Lewis, Bishop of Llandaff
- Adolphus Liddell, civil servant
- Samuel Cunliffe Lister, 2nd Baron Masham, industrialist
- John Llewellin, 1st Baron Llewellin, Conservative politician, President of the Board of Trade, and Governor-General of the Federation of Rhodesia and Nyasaland
- Charles Harford Lloyd, composer and organist
- Walter Long, 1st Viscount Long, Irish Unionist politician, Secretary of State for the Colonies, and First Lord of the Admiralty
- George Blundell Longstaff, local politician in Wandsworth and entomologist
- Robert Lowe, Liberal politician, Chancellor of the Exchequer, and Home Secretary
- Roger Lumley, 11th Earl of Scarbrough, Conservative politician, British Army general, and Governor of Bombay
- Richard Lumley, 12th Earl of Scarbrough, peer and soldier
- Charles Lyell, Liberal politician
- John Charles Lyons, Anglo-Irish landowner, politician, antiquary, and horticulturalist
- Frederick Mackenzie, soldier and cricketer
- Kenneth Muir Mackenzie, 1st Baron Muir Mackenzie, barrister and civil servant
- Duncan Mackinnon, rower who won gold at the 1908 Summer Olympics
- Angus Macnab, perennialist philosopher
- Sir George Macpherson-Grant, 3rd Baronet, landowner and cattle breeder
- William Macrorie, Bishop of Pietermaritzburg
- David Maddock, Bishop of Dunwich
- Frederick Maddison, footballer who played in the first international football match
- James Rochfort Maguire, Irish Nationalist politician and British imperialist
- Walter Marcon, cricketer and clergyman
- George Marjoribanks, polo player and banker
- John Malcolm, 1st Baron Malcolm, Conservative politician
- John Malcolm, 1st Baron Malcolm of Poltalloch, Conservative politician
- Sir Alexander Malet, 2nd Baronet, diplomat and writer
- Tony Marchington, biotechnologist and owner of the LNER Class A3 4472 Flying Scotsman
- Walter Marcon, cricketeer
- Roger Makins, British ambassador to the United States
- Walter Mant, Anglican priest
- David Frederick Markham, Canon of Windsor
- James Marshall, Chief Justice of the Supreme Court of the Gold Coast
- Nevil Story Maskelyne, geologist and mineralogist
- John Cecil Masterman, Vice-Chancellor of the University of Oxford and spymaster in charge of the Double-Cross System
- Schomberg Kerr McDonnell, Principal Private Secretary to the Prime Minister
- Æneas John McIntyre, Liberal politician
- Algernon Methuen, publisher
- Sir Henry Meux, 2nd Baronet, Conservative politician and owner of the Horse Shoe Brewery
- Bobby Milburn, Anglican priest and dean of Worcester Cathedral
- Charles Thomas Mills, Conservative politician and Baby of the House
- Bertram Freeman-Mitford, 1st Baron Redesdale, traveller, diplomat, writer, and collector
- Eric Archibald McNair VC, soldier
- George Monckton-Arundell, 7th Viscount Galway, Conservative politician
- Lionel Monckton, composer of music theatre
- William Monsell, 1st Baron Emly, Liberal politician and President of the Board of Health
- Sir Edmund Monson, 1st Baronet, diplomat and Ambassador to multiple countries
- William Monson, 1st Viscount Oxenbridge, Liberal politician
- Archibald Montgomerie, 17th Earl of Eglinton, peer
- Henry Nottidge Moseley, naturalist who sailed on the Challenger expedition and Linacre Professor of Zoology at the University of Oxford
- Henry Moseley, physicist who provided the physical justification for the atomic number and discovered Moseley's law
- Charles Mott-Radclyffe, Conservative politician
- Walter John Napier, barrister and Attorney-General of the Straits Settlements
- Francis Needham, 3rd Earl of Kilmorey, Conservative politician
- Alexander Nicoll, Regius Professor of Hebrew
- Henry Northcote, 1st Baron Northcote, Conservative politician, Governors of Bombay, and Governor-General of Australia
- Eardley Norton, barrister, member of the Imperial Legislative Council, and early member of the Indian National Congress
- John Norwood VC, soldier
- Frederick Oakeley, Church of England Canon of Westminster before converting to the Roman Catholic Church
- James Adey Ogle, physician
- Pierce Charles de Lacy O'Mahony, Irish Nationalist politician and philanthropist
- Ralph T. O'Neal, Premier of the Virgin Islands
- William Onslow, 4th Earl of Onslow, Conservative politician and Governor of New Zealand
- George Osborne, 8th Duke of Leeds, peer
- Frank Pakenham, 7th Earl of Longford, Labour Party politician, Leader of the House of Lords, and Secretary of State for the Colonies
- Henry Palairet, cricketer and archer
- Walter Parratt, organist and composer
- William D.M. Paton, pharmacologist
- Charles Kegan Paul, author, publisher, and clergyman
- Henry Pelham-Clinton, 5th Duke of Newcastle, Secretary of State for War and the Colonies
- Henry Pelham-Clinton, 6th Duke of Newcastle, peer
- E. H. Pember, barrister
- Charles Perceval, 7th Earl of Egmont, Conservative politician
- Henry Percy, 7th Duke of Northumberland, Conservative politician, Lord High Steward, and Treasurer of the Household
- William Pery, 3rd Earl of Limerick, Conservative politician and Captain of the Yeomen of the Guard
- Edmund Pery, 5th Earl of Limerick, soldier and sportsman
- Sir Henry Peyton, 3rd Baronet, Conservative politician
- Henry Pickard, cricketer and clergyman
- William Pickford, 1st Baron Sterndale, Lord Justice of Appeal, President of the Probate, Divorce and Admiralty Division, Master of the Rolls
- John Platts-Mills, Labour politician who helped form the Labour Independent Group
- Jacob Pleydell-Bouverie, 4th Earl of Radnor, peer
- Duncan Pocklington, first-class cricketer and clergyman
- Melville Portal, Conservative politician
- Frederick Pottinger, police inspector in New South Wales who fought the Bushrangers
- Arthur Porritt, Baron Porritt, physician, sportsman who won a bronze medal in the 100 m sprint at the 1924 Summer Olympics, and Governor-General of New Zealand
- Thomas Powys, 4th Baron Lilford, ornithologist
- Charles Praed, Conservative politician
- Arthur Purey-Cust, Church of England priest and author
- Cecil Rhodes, imperialist, Prime Minister of the Cape Colony, and mining magnate
- Matthew White Ridley, 2nd Viscount Ridley, Conservative politician
- Arthur Rivers, dean of St David's Cathedral, Hobart
- John Varley Roberts, choirmaster
- George Robertson, Australian cricketer
- Thomas Herbert Robertson, barrister and Conservative politician
- Ellis Robins, 1st Baron Robins, businessman
- John Rous, 4th Earl of Stradbroke, peer
- George Rodney, 8th Baron Rodney, British peer
- William Scoresby Routledge, ethnographer, anthropologist, and adventurer
- George Rushout, 3rd Baron Northwick, Conservative politician
- Herbrand Russell, 11th Duke of Bedford, President of the Zoological Society of London
- Oliver Russell, 2nd Baron Ampthill, imperial administrator, Governor of Madras and Viceroy of India
- William Russell, 8th Duke of Bedford, Whig politician
- Bulmer de Sales La Terriere, soldier
- Lionel Sackville-West, 3rd Baron Sackville, peer
- Henry Samuelson, Liberal politician
- Daniel Sandford, classicist
- Duncan Sandys, Conservative politician, Secretary of State for Defence, and Secretary of State for the Colonies
- Stuart Sankey, barrister and politician
- John Scobell, cricketer and clergyman
- James Edwards Sewell, Warden of New College, Oxford
- Albert Seymour, Archdeacon of Barnstaple
- Ernest Hamilton Sharp, barrister in Hong Kong
- Thomas Shaw-Hellier, soldier, cattle breeder, and Director of the Royal Military School of Music
- Walter Francis Short, clergyman and schoolmaster
- Walter Sichel, biographer
- Sir John Simeon, 3rd Baronet, Liberal politician and president of the Canterbury Association
- Douglas Sladen, Professor of History at University of Sydney and writer
- William Somerville, 1st Baron Athlumney, Liberal politician and Chief Secretary for Ireland
- Henry Southwell, Bishop of Lewes
- Frederick Smith, 2nd Earl of Birkenhead, historian
- Arthur Smith-Barry, 1st Baron Barrymore, Anglo-Irish Conservative politician
- George Spencer, Bishop of Madras
- John Spencer-Churchill, 7th Duke of Marlborough, Conservative politician, Lord President of the Council, and Lord Lieutenant of Ireland
- Krishnan Srinivasan, Indian diplomat and civil servant, Foreign Secretary of India, and Commonwealth Deputy Secretary-General
- Haldane Stewart, composer and cricketeer
- Randolph Stewart, 9th Earl of Galloway, Lord Lieutenant of Kirkcudbright
- Alan Stewart, 10th Earl of Galloway, Irish peer and Conservative politician
- Montagu Stone-Wigg, inaugural Bishop of New Guinea
- Herbert Strong, professor of comparative philology and logic at the University of Melbourne
- James Stubbs, Grand Secretary of the United Grand Lodge of England
- William Studholme New Zealand cricketer and barrister
- Ernest Swinton, soldier who developed the term tank and Chichele Professor of Military History at All Souls College, Oxford
- Thomas Taylour, Earl of Bective, Conservative politician
- James Tetley, Archdeacon of Bristol
- Albert Thornton, cricketer
- Lord Alexander Thynne, Conservative politician
- Henry Tizard, chemist, President of Imperial College London, and helped develop radar
- Henry James Tollemache, Conservative politician
- Hugh Trevor-Roper, historian and Regius Professor of History
- Henry Baker Tristram, parson-naturalist, ornithologist, and traveller across North Africa and the Near East
- Thomas Hutchinson Tristram, lawyer
- Henry Tufton, 1st Baron Hothfield, Liberal politician and owner and breeder of racehorses
- Charles Arthur Turner, Chief Justice of the Madras High Court
- Rivers Turnbull, cricketer
- William Tyssen-Amherst, 1st Baron Amherst of Hackney, Conservative politician and art collector
- Richard St John Tyrwhitt, Church of England clergyman and art critic
- George Upton, 3rd Viscount Templetown, Anglo-Irish soldier and peer
- George Vane-Tempest, 5th Marquess of Londonderry, Conservative politician and diplomat
- Henry Vane, 9th Baron Barnard, peer
- Shyamji Krishna Varma, Indian revolutionary, journalist, scholar, and founder of founded the Indian Home Rule Society, India House, and The Indian Sociologist
- Henry Venables, Australian educationalist
- Sir Harry Vernon, 1st Baronet, Liberal politician
- Stirling Voules, cricketer and clergyman
- Walter Wardle, Archdeacon of Gloucester
- George Warren, 2nd Baron de Tabley, Liberal politician and Treasurer of the Household
- John Warren, 3rd Baron de Tabley, poet, numismatist, botanist and an authority on bookplates
- Baron Dickinson Webster, wire manufacturer
- Thomas Dewar Weldon, philosopher
- Frederic Weatherly, barrister and lyricist
- Basil Wilberforce, Chaplain to the Speaker of the House of Commons and Archdeacon of Westminster
- Oscar Wilde, poet and playwright
- Robert Williams, Conservative politician
- Watkin Williams, Bishop of Bangor
- Walter Bradford Woodgate, sportsman who founded Vincent's Club and invented the coxless four
- John Wolfenden, Baron Wolfenden, educationalist who wrote the Wolfenden report
- Edward Murray Wrong, historian and vice-president of Magdalen College, Oxford
- Windham Wyndham-Quin, 4th Earl of Dunraven and Mount-Earl, Irish Conservative politician and soldier, Under-Secretary of State for the Colonies, and founder of the Irish Reform Association
