= Bertram Maurice Hobby =

English entomologist

Bertram Maurice Hobby (23 October 1905 – 19 July 1983) was an English entomologist who worked at Oxford University and served as an editor of the Entomologist's Monthly Magazine. He was a specialist on predatory insects, especially in the fly families, Asilidae and the Empididae.

== Birth and education ==
Hobby was born in Southampton where he became interested in the insects in the New Forest as a schoolboy. He studied zoology at Oxford University graduating in 1929.

== Career ==
Following graduation, he worked as a research fellow, obtaining a DPhil in 1934 working under Edward Bagnall Poulton. He then joined the entomology department at Oxford University, retiring in 1972.

He took part in the Oxford expedition to Sarawak in 1932, and was a Fellow of Wolfson College from 1965 to 1973.

== Private life ==
He married Marcia Prestidge in 1937, with whom he worked on the editorial board of the Entomologist's Monthly Magazine. He served as editor in chief from 1964 to 1981.

His hobbies included playing chess, and he was also a keen swimmer and water polo player, who served as an examiner for the Royal Life-Saving Society.

He was a Freemason under the United Grand Lodge of England. He was a member of both the Churchill Lodge No 478, and the Apollo University Lodge No 357 (both in Oxford), and went on to serve in the Provincial Grand Lodge of Oxfordshire, first as Provincial Grand Secretary, and then from 1971 as Deputy Provincial Grand Master.
