= Eric Archibald McNair =

Recipient of the Victoria Cross

- Born: 16 June 1894; Calcutta, British India
- Died: 12 August 1918 (aged 24); Genoa, Italy
- Burial place: Staglieno War Cemetery, Genoa
- Military career
- Allegiance: United Kingdom
- Branch: British Army
- Rank: Captain
- Units: Royal Sussex Regiment
- Conflicts: World War I
- Awards: Victoria Cross

Eric Archibald McNair VC (16 June 1894 – 12 August 1918) was a British soldier. He was a recipient of the Victoria Cross, the highest and most prestigious award for gallantry in the face of the enemy that can be awarded to British and Commonwealth forces.

== Biography ==
He was educated at Charterhouse School from 1907 to 1913, where he was Head of the School. He then went to Magdalen College, Oxford to study classics, though he left his studies shortly after matriculating to join the forces. While at Oxford he joined the Apollo University Lodge.

He was 21 years old, and a Temporary Lieutenant in the 9th (Service) Battalion, Royal Sussex Regiment, British Army during the First World War when the following deed took place for which he was awarded the VC.

For most conspicuous bravery. When the enemy exploded a mine, Lieutenant McNair and many men of two platoons were hoisted into the air, and many men were buried. But, though much shaken, he at once organised a party with a machine-gun to man the near edge of the crater and opened rapid fire on a large party of the enemy, who were advancing. The enemy were driven back, leaving many dead.

Lieutenant McNair then ran back for reinforcements, and sent to another unit for bombs, ammunition and tools to replace those buried.

The communication trench being blocked, he went across the open under heavy fire and led up the reinforcements the same way. His prompt and plucky action and example undoubtedly saved the situation.

He later achieved the rank of Captain. He died of chronic dysentery at the base hospital in Genoa, Italy, on 12 August 1918.

His Victoria Cross is displayed at the Eastbourne Redoubt Museum, Eastbourne, Sussex, England.
