= Louis Cockerell =

English cricketer and clegyman

Personal information
- Full name: Louis Arthur Cockerell
- Born: 20 November 1836; North Weald, Essex, England
- Died: 4 March 1929 (aged 92); Oxford, Oxfordshire, England
- Batting: Unknown
- Bowling: Unknown
- Relatives: Ralph Benson (brother-in-law)

Career statistics
Competition	First-class
Matches	1
Runs scored	8
Batting average	8.00
100s/50s	–/–
Top score	8
Balls bowled	12
Wickets	0
Bowling average	–
5 wickets in innings	–
10 wickets in match	–
Best bowling	–
Catches/stumpings	–/–
- Source: Cricinfo, 21 July 2020

Louis Arthur Cockerell (20 November 1836 – 4 March 1929) was an English first-class cricketer and clergyman.

The son of The Reverend Henry Cockerell, he was born in November 1836 at North Weald, Essex. He was educated at Rugby School, before going up to Balliol College, Oxford. Having been coached in cricket at Rugby by John Lillywhite, Cockerell was a member of the Oxford University Cricket Club, though he never managed to force his way into the eleven. While at Oxford he befriended Cecil Fiennes, who nominated him for membership of the new founded Harlequins Club in 1856. After graduating from Oxford, Cockerell took holy orders in the Church of England, with his first ecclesiastical duties being as curate of North Weald in 1863.

In 1864, he became the curate of Boughton Aluph in Kent, a position he held until 1867. While based in Kent, he made a single appearance in first-class cricket for the Gentlemen of Kent against the Gentlemen of Marylebone Cricket Club at Canterbury in 1865. Cockerell batted once in the match, scoring 8 runs before he was dismissed by Henry Arkwright. Described by Wisden Cricketers' Almanack as “a very rising bowler, with a good delivery”, he bowled three overs in the match without taking a wicket. From 1867–70 he was the curate of Foulsham in Norfolk, before returning to his home parish where he was curate from 1870–81. In 1881 he was appointed vicar at North Weald, which he held until he became the vicar of Wormington in 1892. By the time of his death in March 1929, Cockerell was the oldest member of the Harlequins Club which he had joined seventy-three years previously. His brother-in-law, Ralph Benson, also played first-class cricket.
