= James Stubbs =

English freemasonry administrator

Sir James Wilfrid Stubbs, KCVO, TD (1910–2000) was an English freemasonry administrator. He was Grand Secretary of the United Grand Lodge of England from 1958 to 1980.

== Early life and education ==
Born on 13 August 1910, Stubbs was the elder son of Elizabeth, née Pope, and the Rev. Wilfrid Thomas Stubbs (born 1875), the vicar of Barkway and the son of the Anglican bishop William Stubbs. He had two younger brothers (Thomas Arthur and Hugh William) and a sister (Katherine Muriel Rose). One of his uncles was the colonial administrator Sir Edward Stubbs. James Stubbs attended Charterhouse and then Brasenose College, Oxford, where he studied classics. In 1931, he joined the Apollo University Lodge, becoming a freemason.

== Career and retirement ==
After graduating from Oxford, he was employed as a teacher at St Paul's School. He served in the Royal Corps of Signals during the Second War and ended his service with the rank of lieutenant colonel. After a period teaching again at St Paul's, he successfully applied to be principal assistant to Sydney White, the Grand Secretary of the United Grand Lodge of England, the governing Masonic lodge for most of the country. He was promoted to Assistant Grand Secretary in 1948, Deputy Grand Secretary six years later and then succeeded White as Grand Secretary in 1958. During this period, he assisted with the establishment of the Grand Lodge of India in 1961 and the 250th anniversary of the English Grand Lodge in 1967.

Stubbs was appointed a Knight Commander of the Royal Victorian Order in 1979 and retired in 1980. He was given the Order of Service to Masonry in 1996. An avid traveller, Stubbs wrote The Four Corners (1983), as well as an autobiography, Freemasonry in My Life (1985), and The Government of the Craft (1982). He died on 7 March 2000; his wife Richenda (née Streatfeild, sister of Noel Streatfeild) had died in 1995.
