= Church of St Margaret, Middle Chinnock =

Church in Somerset, England

Church of St Margaret
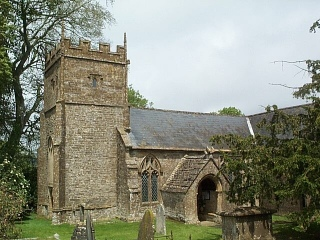

- Location within Somerset
- 50.9152°N 2.7523°W
- Location: Middle Chinnock, Somerset, England

History
- Built: 12th century

Listed Building – Grade II*
- Official name: Church of St Margaret
- Designated: 19 April 1961
- Reference no.: 1057169

The Anglican Church of St Margaret in Middle Chinnock, Somerset, England was built in the 12th century. It is a Grade II* listed building.

== History ==
The church was built in the 12th century with the tower and porch being added in the 14th or 15th centuries. It underwent extensive Victorian restoration in the 19th century, which included the removal of the gallery.

The parish is part of the Norton-sub-Hamdon benefice within the Diocese of Bath and Wells.

== Architecture ==
The hamstone building has slate roofs. It is 57 feet (17 m) long and consists of a three-bay nave and two-bay chancel. The 40 feet (12 m) high two-stage tower is supported by buttresses.

Inside the church are panels and a hatchment from the 15th to 17th centuries and a font from the 12th. A 14th century effigy of a priest was restored by W. D. Caröe in 1928.

In the churchyard is a war memorial with a tapered shaft and wheel cross. There is also a Yew tree with a girth of 15 feet 11 inches (4.85 m) in 2014.
