= Edgefield, Norfolk =

Village in Norfolk, England

Coordinates: 52.86682°N 1.11524°E

Edgefield
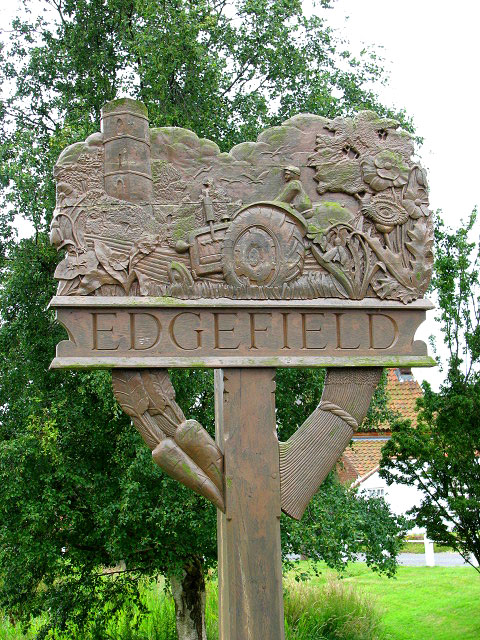
- Edgefield Village sign

- Location within Norfolk
- Area: 3.89 sq mi (10.1 km^{2})
- Population: 436 (2021 census)
  - Density: 112/sq mi (43/km^{2})
- OS grid reference: TG0934
  - London: 127 miles (204 km)
- Civil parish: Edgefield
- District: North Norfolk
- Shire county: Norfolk
- Region: East
- Country: England
- Sovereign state: United Kingdom
- Post town: MELTON CONSTABLE
- Postcode district: NR24
- Dialling code: 01263
- Police: Norfolk
- Fire: Norfolk
- Ambulance: East of England
- UK Parliament: North Norfolk

Edgefield is a village and a civil parish in the English county of Norfolk.

Edgefield is located 3.3 miles (5.3 km) south of Holt and 18 miles (29 km) of Norwich.

== Etymology ==
Edgefield's name is of Anglo-Saxon origin and derives from the Old English for an enclosed area of parkland.

== History ==
In the Domesday Book, Edgefield is listed as a settlement of 36 households in the hundred of Holt. In 1086, the village was divided between the East Anglian estates of Peter de Valognes and Ranulf, brother of Ilger.

During the Second World War, defensive emplacements including a mortar battery and searchlight were built in Edgefield in preparation for a potential German invasion of Great Britain.

== Geography ==
According to the 2021 census, Edgefield has a population of 436 people which shows an increase from the 385 people recorded in the 2011 census.

== Transport ==
Edgefield is bisected by the B1149, between Holt and Norwich.

The nearest railway station is at Sheringham for the Bittern Line which runs between Sheringham and Norwich. The nearest airport is Norwich International Airport. The village is situated on the B1149 between Norwich and Holt road.

== Church of St. Peter and St. Paul ==
Edgefield's parish church is jointly dedicated to Saint Peter and Saint Paul and was re-built in 1883 and 1884 by J.D. Sedding during the tenure of Reverend Walter Herbert Marcon. It is located close to the village on Sweetbriar Lane, and has been Grade II listed since 1987.

The church also possesses good examples of twentieth-century stained glass by John Hayward and a font made from Purbeck Marble and dating from the thirteenth century. Rev. Walter Herbert Marcon (Rector 1875 to 1937) is commemorated in the church where he is depicted riding his bicycle in a stained-glass window, which also commemorates the building of the church.

The Thirteenth Century church tower from the medieval church still stands in a farmyard on the road to Hunworth. It is octagonal in shape and built from flint and carrstone. The remnants and tower of the old church were renovated with grants from English Heritage in 1981. The rector and Parochial church council still have the responsibility for the tower, while responsibility for the churchyard has been passed to the civil authorities.

== Amenities ==
The village public house is called 'The Pigs' and has stood on the site since 1744 under various names. In its history, the pub has operated under the ownership of the Coltishall Brewery, Brereton's of Letheringsett, Bullard's of Norwich, Watney Mann Ltd. and now operates as a free house. In the mid-Nineteenth Century, Piggs Inn (as it was then called) was involved in the smuggling of spirits led by landlord James Dyball.

Edgefield School dates from the Nineteenth Century and was enlarged in 1878. The school building was closed in 1900 with local children being educated at what is now the village hall.

Edgefield is also home to RMC Autos, a car garage.

== Notable residents ==
- Reverend Walter Marcon- (1824–1875) cleric, cricketer and Rector of Edgefield.

== Governance ==
Edgefield is part of the electoral ward of Stody for local elections and is part of the district of North Norfolk.

The village's national constituency is North Norfolk, which has been represented by the Liberal Democrat Steff Aquarone MP since 2024.

== War memorial ==
Edgefield's war memorial originally stood as an obelisk on the village green but by the early twenty-first century this had fallen into disrepair. As a result, a new memorial was built on the village green at the cost of £1,968 and subsequently unveiled on 11 November 2004. The memorial lists the following names for the First World War:

Rank	Name	Unit	Date of death	Burial/Commemoration
Pte.	Charles R. Peck	1st Bn., Essex Regiment	14 Apr. 1917	Arras Memorial
Pte.	Thomas Fabb	4th Bn., Middlesex Regiment	11 Mar. 1918	Lijssenthoek Military Cemetery
Pte.	Percy H. Coleman	7th Bn., Norfolk Regiment	10 Aug. 1918	Vis-en-Artois Memorial
Pte.	George E. Jacobs	8th Bn., Norfolk Regt.	19 Jul. 1916	Thiepval Memorial
Pte.	Percy H. Peck	7th Bn., York and Lancaster Regt.	6 Jun. 1918	St. Sever Cemetery

There is another stone memorial in the church which lists the following names for the Second World War:

Rank	Name	Unit	Date of death	Burial/Commemoration
Sgt.	Frank G. Lambert	Royal Air Force Volunteer Reserve	23 Dec. 1941	City Road Cemetery, Sheffield
Cpl.	Charles W. Catten	6th Bn., Green Howards	27 Sep. 1944	Oosterbeek War Cemetery
OS	Percy R. Barstard	HMS Duchess	12 Dec. 1939	Chatham Naval Memorial
Pte.	James R. Bunting	6th Bn., Royal Norfolk Regiment	21 Sep. 1944	Kranji War Memorial
Tpr.	Walter T. Chestney	23rd Hussars	27 Jun. 1944	Bayeux War Cemetery

== Gallery ==
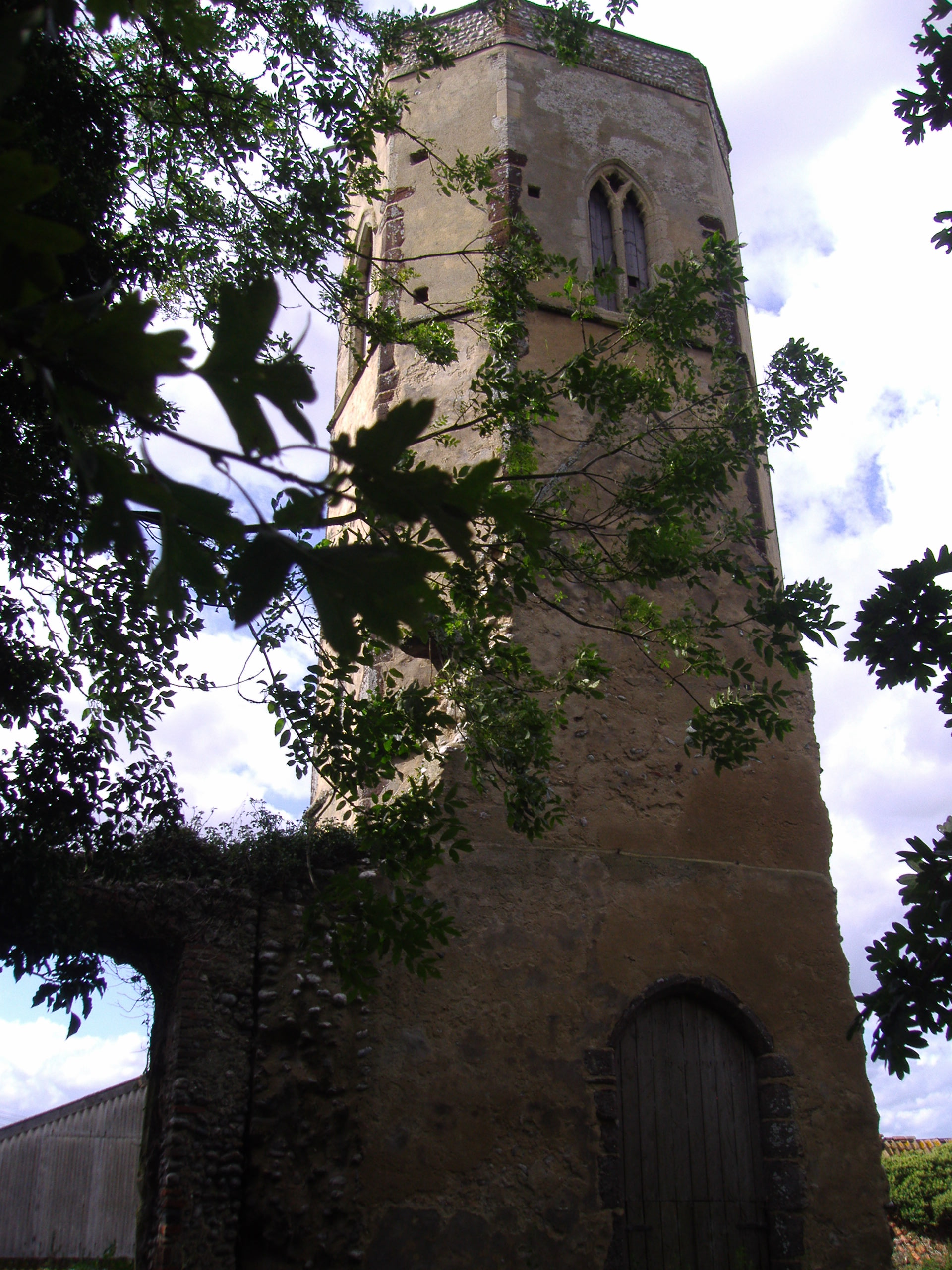
Remains of the old church tower

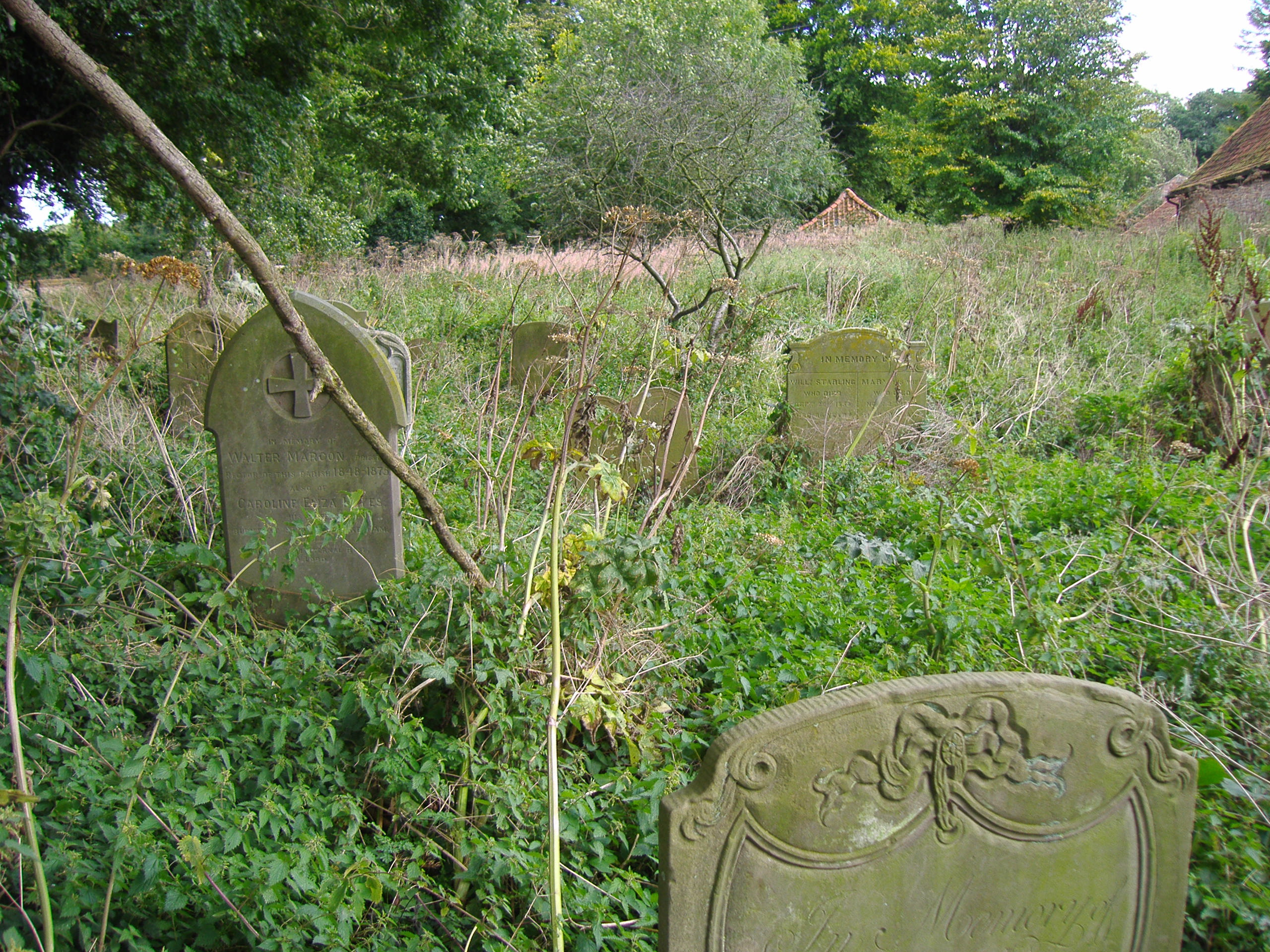
The old graveyard of Saint Peter and Saint Paul's Church

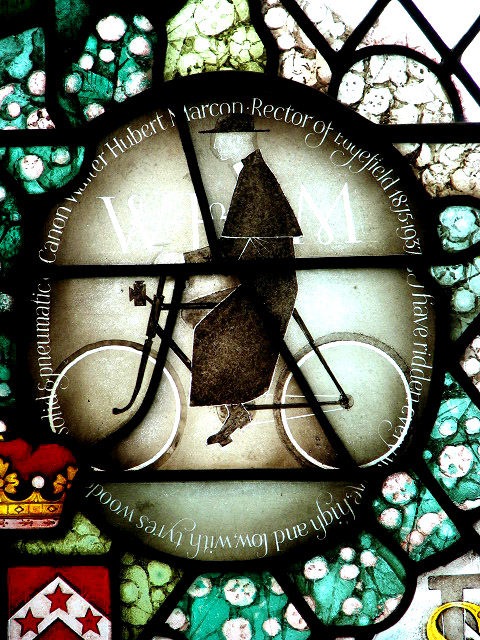
Stained glass roundel of Canon Walter Herbert Marcon on his Bicycle in the church
