= Middle Chinnock =

Village in Somerset, England

Coordinates: 50.9162°N 2.7517°W

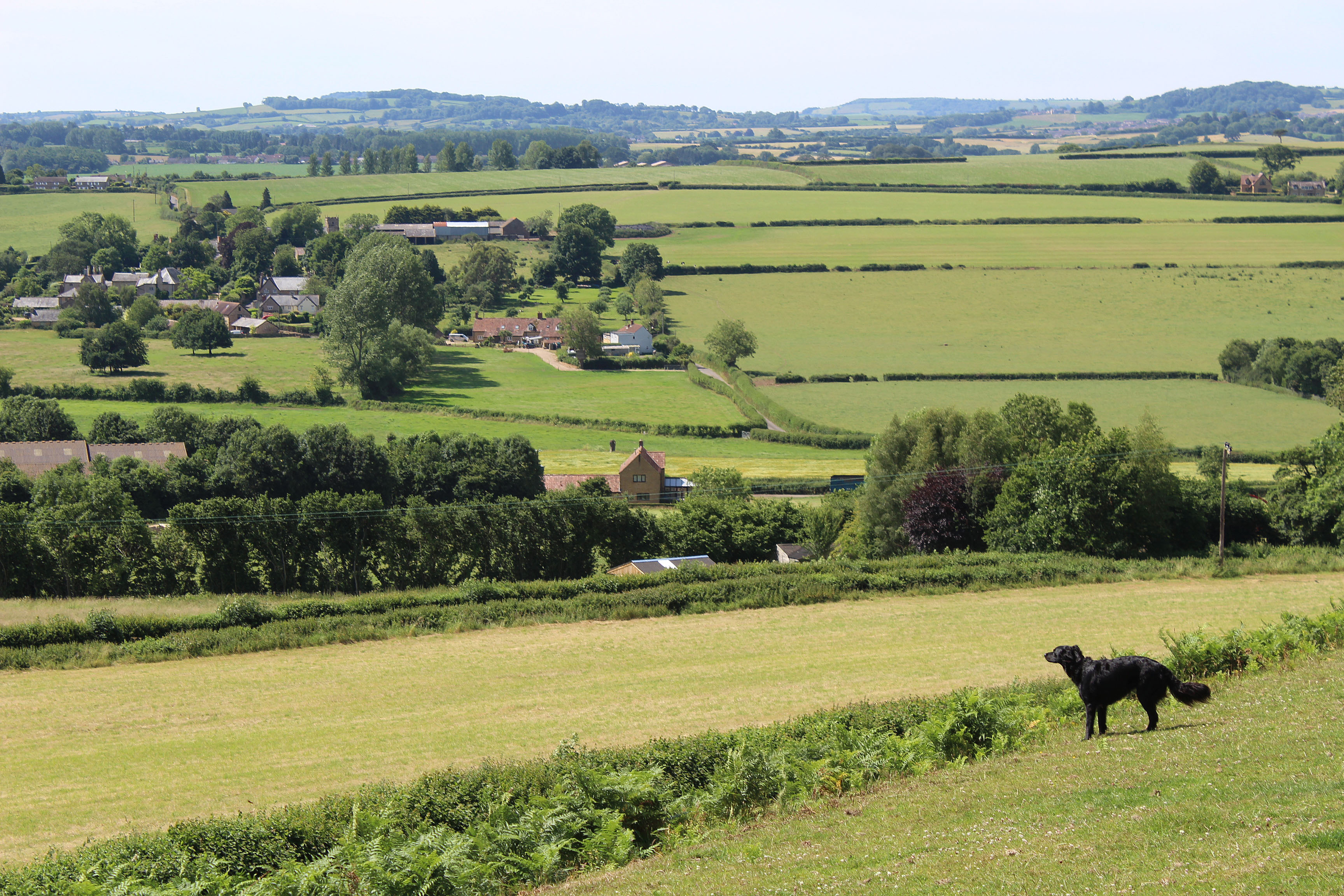
- Middle Chinnock from Brympton Hill

- Location within Somerset
- OS grid reference: ST473133
- Civil parish: West and Middle Chinnock
- Unitary authority: Somerset
- Ceremonial county: Somerset
- Region: South West
- Country: England
- Sovereign state: United Kingdom
- Post town: CREWKERNE
- Postcode district: TA18 7
- Dialling code: 01935
- Police: Avon and Somerset
- Fire: Devon and Somerset
- Ambulance: South Western
- UK Parliament: Yeovil

Middle Chinnock is a village in the civil parish of West and Middle Chinnock, in Somerset, England, 3 miles (4.8 km) north east of Crewkerne. It lies 0.3 miles (0.5 km) east of the larger village of West Chinnock.

In 1881 the parish had a population of 150. Middle Chinnock was an ancient parish, which became a civil parish in 1866. The civil parish was abolished on 25 March 1885 and absorbed into the parish of West Chinnock. In 2003 the parish was renamed West and Middle Chinnock.

== History ==
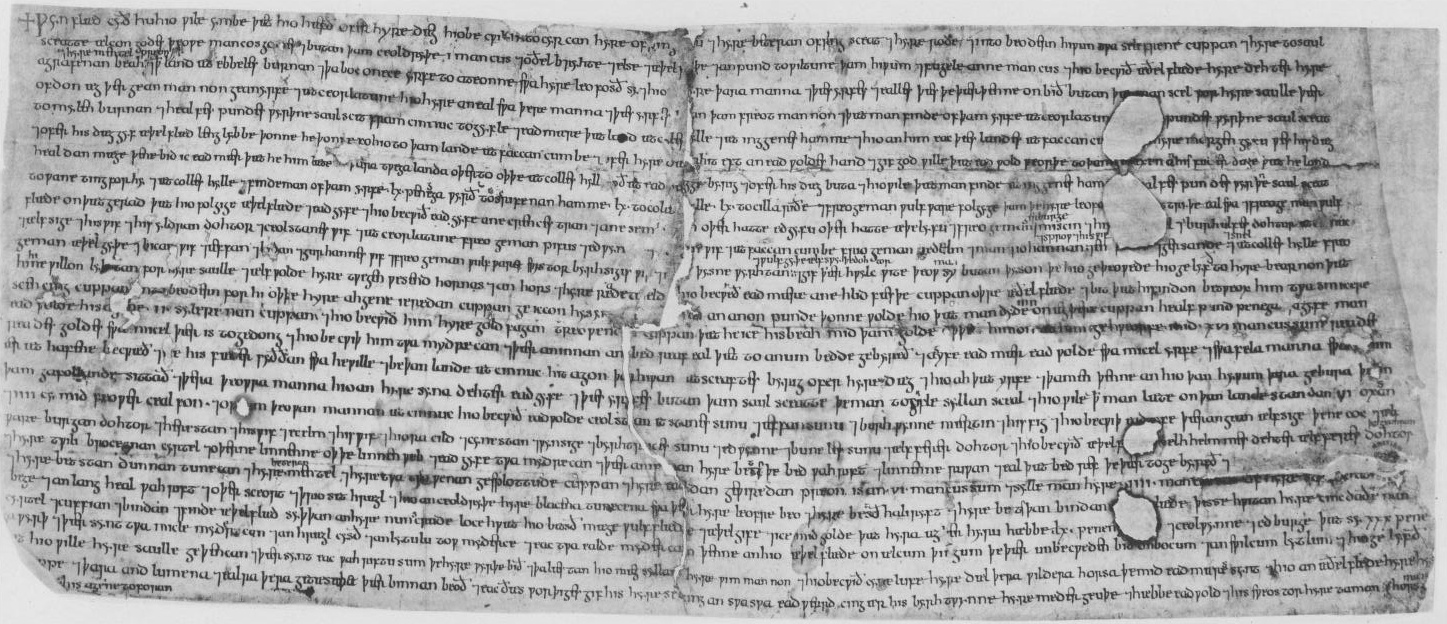
Will of Wynflæd, circa AD 950, mentions land at Cinnuc (11th-century copy, British Library Cotton Charters viii. 38)

The origin of the name Chinnock is uncertain. It may be derived from the Old English cinu meaning ravine or cinn meaning a chin shaped hill, with the addition of ock meaning little. An alternative derivation may be an old hill-name of Celtic origin.

A Roman burial was found at Higher Farm, Middle Chinnock.

The Chinnocks were held as one estate in Saxon times by Wynflaed under Shaftesbury Abbey but by the time of the Norman Conquest in 1066 East Chinnock, West Chinnock and Middle Chinnock had been separated.

== Governance ==
The West and Middle Chinnock parish council has co-responsibility for some local issues so sets an annual precept (local rate) to cover its costs and makes annual accounts for public scrutiny. It can submit its evaluation report into all planning applications and works with police, other councils' officers, and neighbourhood watch groups on matters of crime/security, traffic and highways. Conservation matters (including trees and listed buildings) and the environment can be in its reports and initiatives. It maintains and repairs some of, and consults with both higher-tier councils, as to more of, sports/leisure facilities, verges, parks, surface water drainage, paths, public transit and street cleaning.

For local government purposes, since 1 April 2023, the parish comes under the unitary authority of Somerset Council. Prior to this, it was part of the non-metropolitan district of South Somerset (established under the Local Government Act 1972). It was part of Yeovil Rural District before 1974. It is in the 'Parrett' electoral ward. This stretches from Chiselborough in the north, via East Chinnock to North Perrott in the south. The ward population at the 2011 census was 2,336.

It is served by the Yeovil seat in the House of Commons of the Parliament of the United Kingdom.

== Church ==
Ecclesiastically, the parish of Middle Chinnock is now part of the united benefice of Norton-sub-Hamdon, West Chinnock, Chiselborough and Middle Chinnock.

The parish Church of Saint Margaret has 12th-century origins. The tower and south porch were built in the 14th or 15th centuries with most of the remainder of the building being rebuilt in phases during the 19th century. It has been designated as a Grade II* listed building.

== Notable residents ==
- Victor James Marks, former Somerset and England cricketer was born in Middle Chinnock in 1955.
- Stirling Voules, England cricketer, born in Middle Chinnock in 1843.
- Retired navy captain John Warde (1851–1936) CBE, JP died a resident of Middle Chinnock.
- Retired navy captain Arthur E P Welman (1893–1966), awarded the Croix de Guerre and Legion of Honour, one-term vice-president of the Royal Free Hospital and for life a governor. Died a resident of Middle Chinnock.
