= John Evan Hodgson =

John Evan Hodgson RA (London 1 March 1831 – 1895) was a British painter. He painted domestic genres scenes, historical subjects, and in an orientalist fashion inspired by North Africa.

== Life ==
The elder son of John Hodgson, a Russia merchant and member of a leading family in Newcastle upon Tyne, he was born in London. At the age of four he was taken to St. Petersburg, but was sent to England eight years later for his education. He entered Rugby school in February 1846, and on leaving school returned to St. Petersburg and entered his father's counting-house.

Influenced by the old masters in The Hermitage collection and John Ruskin's Modern Painters, Hodgson gave up commerce for an artist's career. In 1853 he went to London and entered as a student at the Royal Academy of Arts. He exhibited his first picture, The Notice of Ejectment, in 1856. From 1859 he lived at 5 Hill Road, Abbey Road, London, and he became a member of the group known later as the St John's Wood set, of which Philip Calderon was the leader.

Hodgson was elected an associate of the Royal Academy on 28 January 1873, and an academician on 18 December 1879. He was appointed librarian to the Royal Academy in 1882 in succession to Solomon Alexander Hart, and professor of painting later in the same year in succession to Edward Armitage. He died on 19 June 1895 at The Larches, Coleshill, Buckinghamshire, where he had resided for about ten years and was buried in the family grave in Highgate Cemetery.

== Works ==
Hodgson showed scenes of domestic life, such as The Arrest (1857), Elector and Candidate (1858), and The German Patriot's Wife (1859). A little later he took to historical subjects, and exhibited Sir Thomas More and his Daughters in Holbein's Studio (1861), The Return of Drake from Cadiz, 1587 (1862), The First Sight of the Armada (1863), Queen Elizabeth at Purfleet (1864), Taking Home the Bride, 1612 (1865), A Jew's Daughter accused of Witchcraft in the Middle Ages (1866), Evensong (1867), Off the Downs in the Days of the Caesars, and two domestic subjects (1868).

A journey to the north of Africa in 1868 led to a change of subjects, and the first of Hodgson's oriental pictures, An Arab Story-teller, was exhibited at the Royal Academy in 1869. It was followed by a long series of pictures of life in Morocco, Algeria, and Tunis.

From 1879 Hodgson painted marine subjects, such as Homeward Bound (1880), Bound for the Black Sea and A Shipwrecked Sailor waiting for a Sail, his diploma work, exhibited in 1881. Versatile in his later years, he exhibited, among other works, Painter and Critic, Hobbema's Country, and In the Low Countries (1882), Robert Burns at the Plough (1887), and landscapes such as Rural England and Coleshill Common.

Hodgson exhibited, in all, 90 pictures at the Royal Academy and about half that number at other galleries. He contributed, with Frederick A. Eaton, a series of articles on the history of the Academy in the eighteenth century to The Art Journal in 1889. He also published Academy Lectures in 1884, and Fifty Years of British Art on the occasion of the Manchester exhibition in 1887. He was a contributor to The Architect and other periodicals and journals.

== Gallery ==
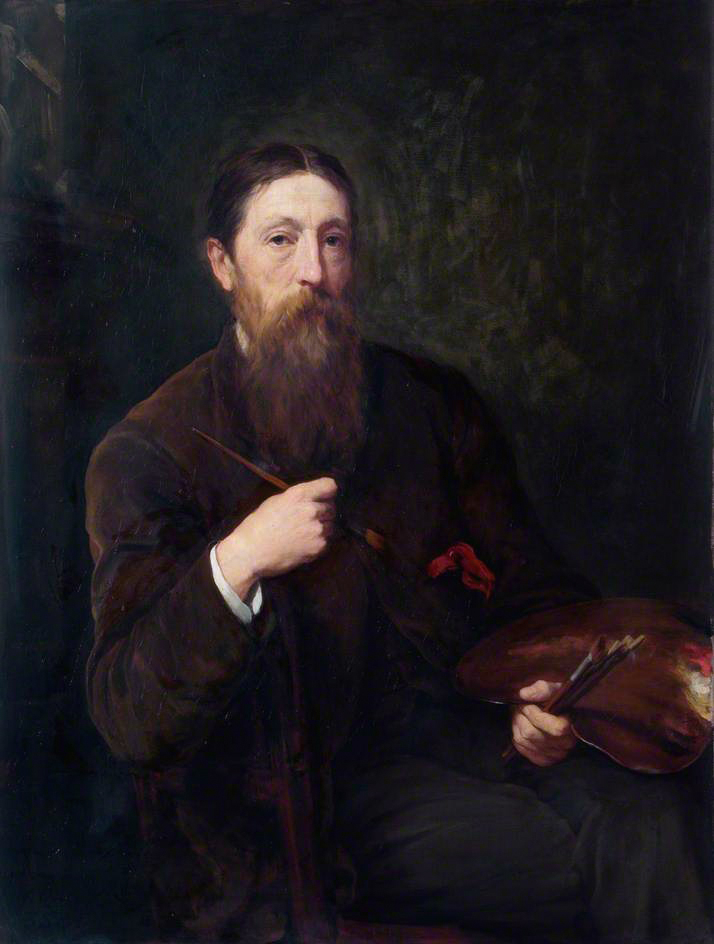
John Evan Hodgson Walter by William Ouless

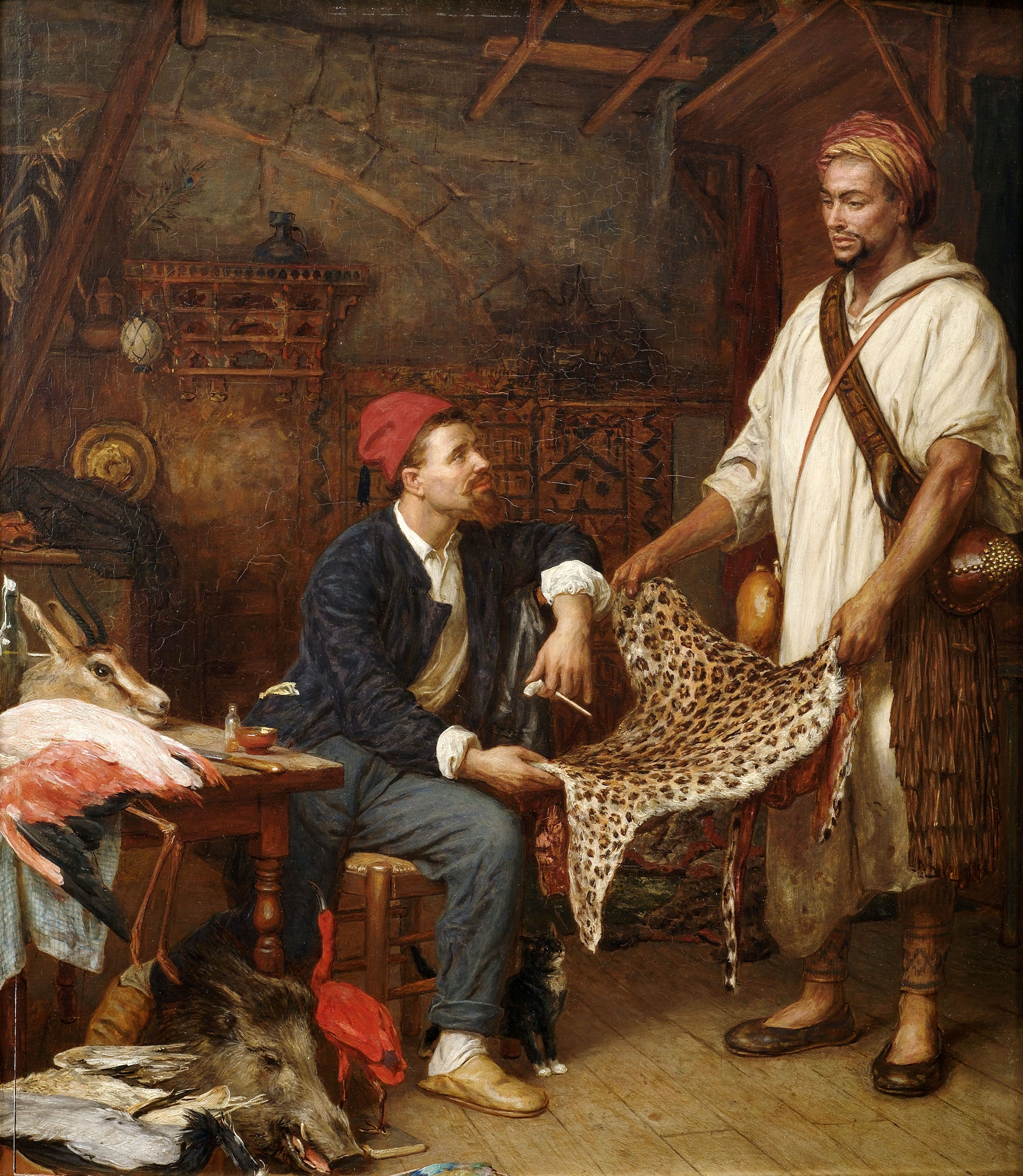
The french naturalist in Algiers

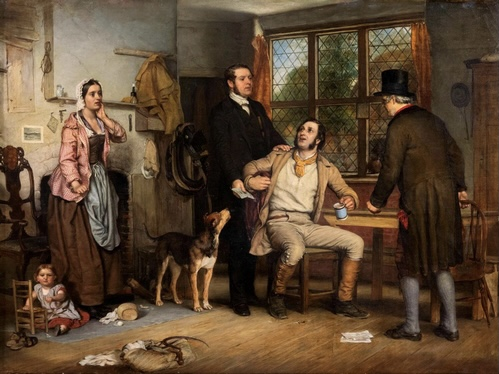
The Arrest

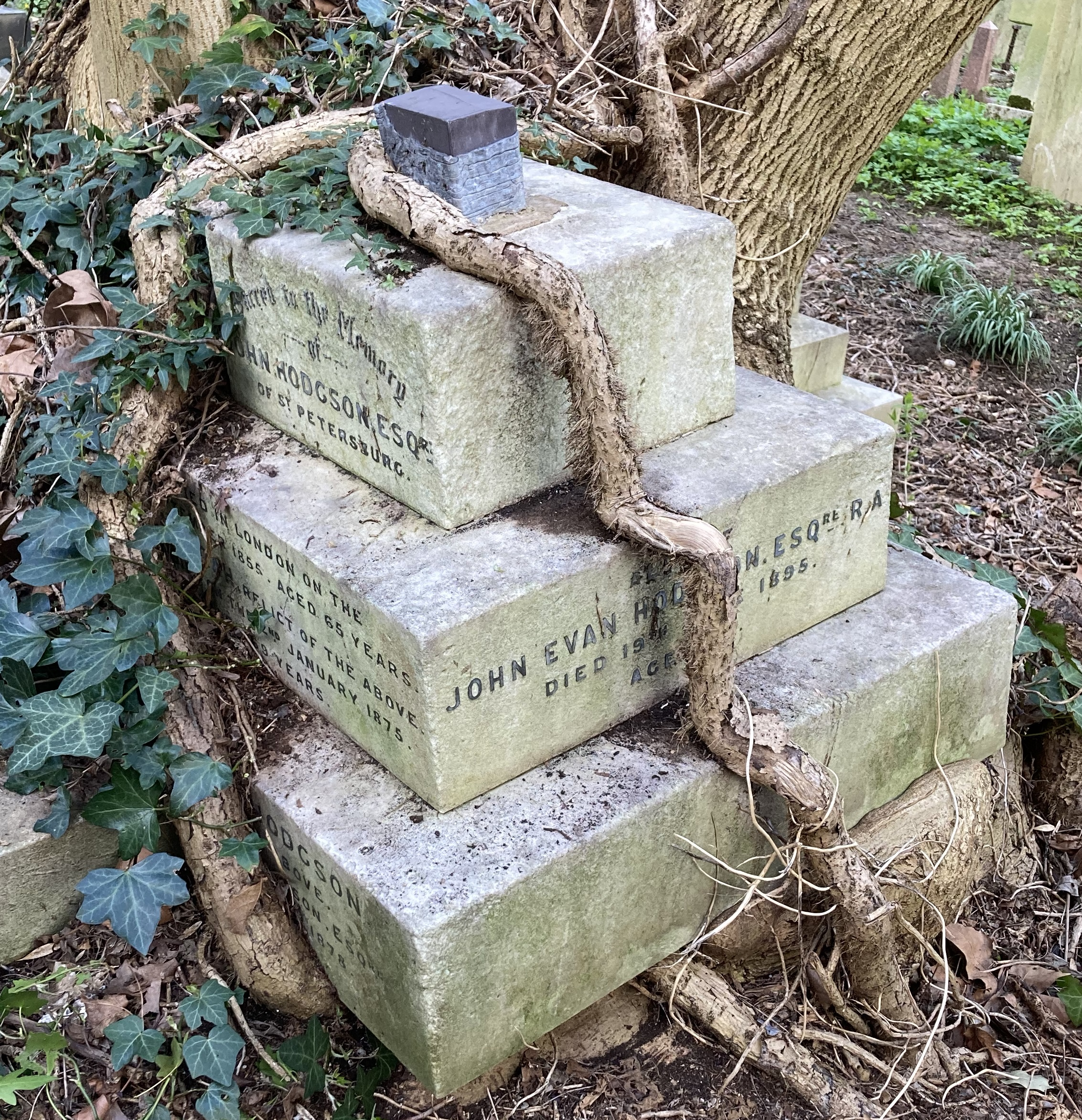
Family grave of John Evan Hodgson in Highgate Cemetery

== Notes ==
Attribution

- This article incorporates text from a publication now in the public domain: Lee, Sidney, ed. (1901). "Hodgson, John Evan". Dictionary of National Biography (1st supplement). Vol. 2. London: Smith, Elder & Co.
