= Frederick A. Eaton =

British writer

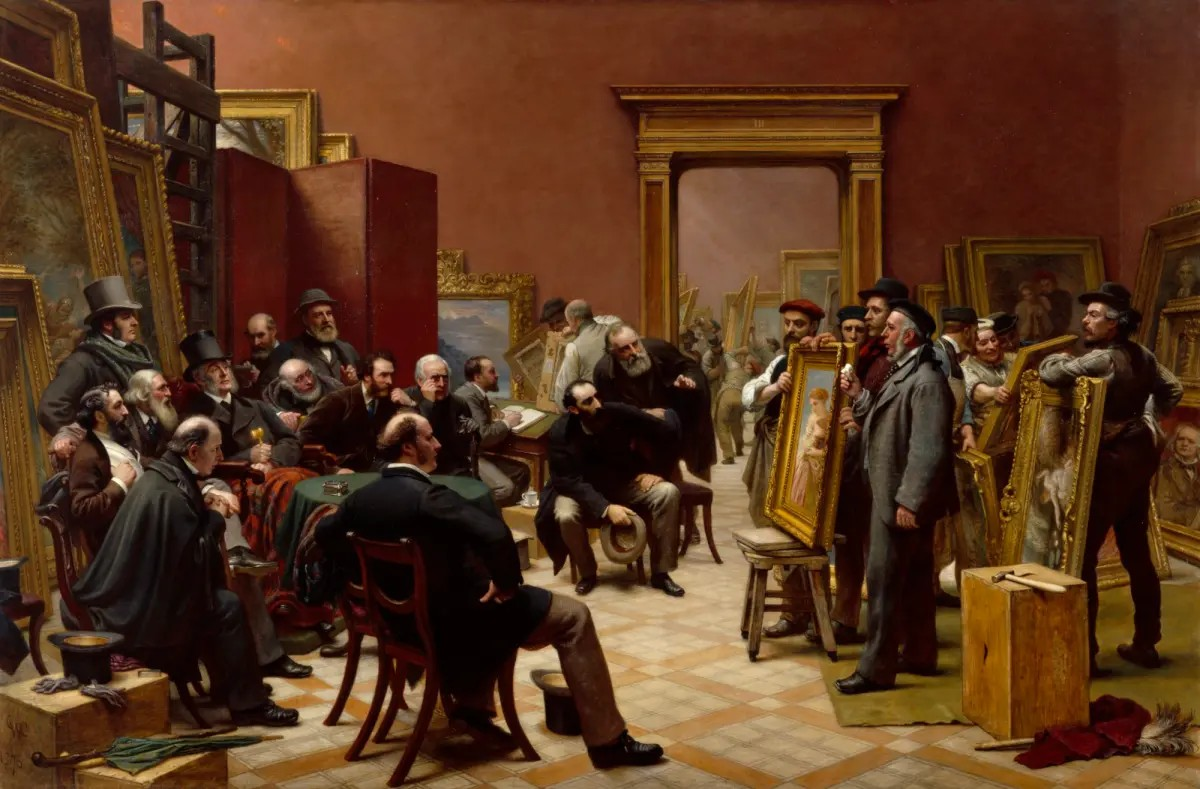
The Council of the Royal Academy Selecting Pictures for the Exhibition, 1875 by Charles West Cope. Eaton is shown seated and writing.

Sir Frederick Alexis Eaton (20 January 1838 – 10 September 1913) was a British writer and editor. He was a chronicler and secretary of the Royal Academy, and also a medievalist.

Eaton was born in Teignmouth, Devon, the seventh son of Charlotte (née Short) and Richard Eaton. He was educated at King's College School, and graduated from St Alban Hall, Oxford in 1860. A frequent contributor to The Quarterly Review, Macmillan's Magazine, Scribner's Magazine, The Nineteenth Century, and other periodicals, Eaton edited Murray's Handbooks for Travellers to Southern Italy and Egypt between 1870 and 1880.

In 1873, he was appointed secretary of the Royal Academy with a salary of £500 per annum, and remained in the post until his death (in Kensington, London). Thomas Graham Jackson commented on Eaton's "gentlemanly tact and unfailing temper" when dealing with irascible artists, and noted that his "enormous experience in the business of the Academy for more than 40 years made his services invaluable". With John Evan Hodgson, he was author of The Royal Academy and Its Members 1768–1830 (1905). Eaton also edited an 1882 two-volume translation from the German of Moritz Thausing's Life and Works of Albrecht Dürer, which received a favourable review in the New York Times, and compiled a list of art in the possession of the Marylebone Cricket Club with Spencer Ponsonby-Fane.

In December 1871, Eaton married Caroline Charlotte Greville, who died in 1893, and the couple had no children. He was knighted in 1911.

== Selected publications ==
- Eaton, Fred A. (1 December 1883). "The Educational Work of the Royal Academy". The Fortnightly Review. New series. Vol. 39, no. 209. London: Chapman and Hall. pp. 783–790 – via HathiTrust.
- Hodgson, J. E. & Eaton, Fred A. (1889). "The Royal Academy in the Last Century". The Art Journal. Vol. 51. London: J. S. Virtue and Co. pp. 129–134, 161–167, 238–244, 293–300, 320–325 – via HathiTrust.
- Hodgson, J. E. & Eaton, Fred A. (1890). "The Royal Academy in the Last Century". The Art Journal. Vol. 52. pp. 46–51, 108–114, 205–211, 257–263, 337–344 – via HathiTrust.
- Hodgson, J. E. & Eaton, Fred A. (1891). "The Royal Academy in the Last Century". The Art Journal. Vol. 53. pp. 114–120, 341–347 – via HathiTrust.
- Hodgson, J. E. & Eaton, Fred A. (1895). "The Royal Academy in the Present Century". The Art Journal. Vol. 57. pp. 143–146, 243–247 – via HathiTrust.
- Hodgson, J. E. & Eaton, Fred A. (1897). "The Royal Academy in the Present Century". The Art Journal. Vol. 59. pp. 185–188 – via HathiTrust.
- Leslie, J. D. & Eaton, Fred A. (1903). "The Royal Academy in the Nineteenth Century". The Art Journal. Vol. 65. pp. 5–9, 331–335, 372–376 – via Internet Archive.
- Eaton, Fred A. (1904). "The Royal Academy". Scribner's Magazine. Vol. 36. New York: Charles Scribner's Sons. pp. 413–427, 556–572 – via HathiTrust.
