= Arthur Faber =

English cricketer, headmaster, and clergyman

Personal information
- Full name: Arthur Henry Faber
- Born: 29 February 1832; Fort St. George, Madras Presidency, British India
- Died: 27 November 1910 (aged 78); Warmsworth, Yorkshire, England
- Nickname: St. Fabian
- Batting: Unknown

Domestic team information
- Years: Team
- 1853: Oxford University

Career statistics
Competition	First-class
Matches	2
Runs scored	101
Batting average	33.66
100s/50s	1/–
Top score	100
Catches/stumpings	1/–
- Source: Cricinfo, 22 November 2019

Arthur Henry Faber (29 February 1832 – 27 November 1910) was an English first-class cricketer, headmaster and clergyman.

The son of Major-General Charles Edward Faber, of the Bengal Engineers (for whom Mount Faber in Singapore is named), and Georgiana, daughter of John Bird, of the Indian Civil Service, he was born at Fort St. George in British India in February 1832. The Faber family were landed gentry of Ampfield, near Romsey, Hampshire. Faber was educated in England at Winchester College, before going up to New College, Oxford. While studying at Oxford, he made a single appearance in first-class cricket for Oxford University against the Marylebone Cricket Club at Oxford in 1853.

Faber graduated from New College in 1853, after which he remained as a fellow until 1865. In 1862, he made a second appearance in first-class cricket for the Gentlemen of the North against the Gentlemen of the South at Lord's, during which he scored a century when he made exactly 100 in Gentlemen of the North first-innings. Faber became the headmaster of Malvern College in 1865, a position he held until 1880. Having taken holy orders, he served as the rector of Sprotbrough, Yorkshire after leaving his post at Malvern. Faber died in November 1910 at Warmsworth, Yorkshire. He had married firstly, in 1864, his second cousin Mary Sophia Faber (died 1875); his second marriage, in 1898, was to Mary Elizabeth Isabella, daughter of Francis Bernard Selwood Tresilian MacCarthy, of Kinsale, County Cork, of the family of MacCarthy Reagh. There were no children from either marriage.
