= Herbert Edlmann =

English cricketer

Personal information
- Full name: Herbert Gottlieb Edlmann
- Born: July 1840; Peckham, Surrey, England
- Died: 2 March 1912 (aged 71); Wokingham, Berkshire, England
- Batting: Unknown
- Bowling: Unknown
- Relatives: Maurice Hall (brother-in-law)

Career statistics
Competition	First-class
Matches	1
Runs scored	17
Batting average	17.00
100s/50s	–/–
Top score	13*
Balls bowled	12
Wickets	0
Bowling average	–
5 wickets in innings	–
10 wickets in match	–
Best bowling	–
Catches/stumpings	–/–
- Source: Cricinfo, 2 August 2020

Herbert Gottlieb Edlmann (July 1840 – 2 March 1912) was an English first-class cricketer and businessman.

The son of the Austrian businessman Joseph Frederick Edlmann and his wife, Mary Ann Agassiz of the Agassiz family, he Edlmann was born at Peckham in July 1840. He later studied at Exeter College, Oxford and after graduating he moved into business, becoming a director at the Royal Mail Steam Packet Company. In cricket, he made a single appearance in first-class cricket for the Gentlemen of England against the Gentlemen of Marylebone Cricket Club at Canterbury in 1864. Batting twice in the match, he ended the Gentlemen of Kent first-innings not out on 13, while in their second innings he was dismissed for 4 runs by Henry Arkwright.

Edlmann died at Wiltshire Farm near Wokingham in March 1912. His brother-in-law, Maurice Hall, also played first-class cricket.
