= John Knapp =

English cricketer

Personal information
- Full name: John Walter Knapp
- Born: 8 March 1841; Paddington, London, England
- Died: 22 June 1881 (aged 40); St Leonards-on-Sea, Sussex, England
- Bowling: Right-arm fast

Domestic team information
- Years: Team
- 1864: Middlesex

Career statistics
Competition	First-class
Matches	1
Runs scored	3
Batting average	3.00
100s/50s	0/0
Top score	3
Catches/stumpings	0/–
- Source: Cricinfo, 22 September 2011

John Walter Knapp (8 March 1841 – 22 June 1881) was an English cricketer. Knapp's batting style is unknown; he bowled right-arm fast. The son of Tyrell Knapp and Harriett Harris, he was born in Paddington, London. In 1859 he attended Exeter College, Oxford.

Knapp made a single first-class appearance for Middlesex against Hampshire in 1864 at the Cattle Market Ground in Islington. In Middlesex's only innings he scored 3 runs before being run out, with Middlesex inflicting a defeat by an innings and 38 runs on a Hampshire side, who like Middlesex were playing in their first season of first-class cricket.

Knapp married a Kate M. Taylor at Woodmansterne, Surrey on 30 July 1878. He died at St Leonards-on-Sea, Sussex on 22 June 1881, aged 40.
