= Rivers Turnbull =

English cricketer

Personal information
- Full name: Rivers Montagu Turnbull
- Born: 6 January 1855; Bulandshahr, North-Western Provinces, British India
- Died: 24 February 1927 (aged 72); Westminster, London, England
- Batting: Right-handed
- Bowling: Right-arm roundarm slow

Domestic team information
- Years: Team
- 1877–1879: Sussex

Career statistics
Competition	First-class
Matches	2
Runs scored	2
Batting average	0.50
100s/50s	0/0
Top score	2
Balls bowled	87
Wickets	2
Bowling average	27.00
5 wickets in innings	0
10 wickets in match	0
Best bowling	2/23
Catches/stumpings	1/–
- Source: Cricinfo, 4 July 2012

Rivers Montagu Turnbull (6 January 1855 – 24 February 1927) was an English cricketer. Turnball was a right-handed batsman who bowled right-arm roundarm slow. He was born at Bulandshahr in British India.

Turnbull made two first-class appearances for Sussex against Lancashire at Old Trafford in 1877, and Kent at the Old County Ground, Town Malling. In his first match, Lancashire won the toss and elected to bat, making 345 all out, during which Turnbull bowled nine wicketless overs, conceding 31 runs. In Sussex's first-innings of 241 all out, Turnbull was dismissed for a duck by Alexander Watson. Forced to follow-on in their second-innings, Sussex were dismissed for just 73 all out, with Turnbull again dismissed for a duck, this time by William McIntyre. Lancashire won the match by an innings and 31 runs. In his second match, Sussex won the toss and elected to bat, making 146 all out, with Turnbull scoring 2 runs before he was dismissed by Dick Penn. Kent responded in their first-innings by making 209 all out, with Turnbull bowling 12.3 overs for 23 runs and taking the wickets of George Hearne and James Bray. In their second-innings, Sussex were dismissed for 147 all out, Turnbull being dismissed for a duck by Charles Cunliffe. Set 88 for victory, Kent were dismissed for just 73, handing Sussex victory by 11 runs.

He died at Westminster in London, on 24 February 1927.
