= Ralph Benson =

English cricketer and barrister

Personal information
- Full name: Ralph Augustus Benson
- Born: 15 October 1828; Hanley, Worcestershire, England
- Died: 11 March 1886 (aged 57); Marylebone, Middlesex, England
- Batting: Unknown

Domestic team information
- Years: Team
- 1855: Marylebone Cricket Club

Career statistics
Competition	First-class
Matches	1
Runs scored	2
Batting average	2.00
100s/50s	–/–
Top score	2
Catches/stumpings	–/–
- Source: Cricinfo, 29 August 2021

Ralph Augustus Benson JP (15 October 1828 — 11 March 1886) was an English first-class cricketer and barrister.

The only son of Moses George Benson, he was born in October 1828 at Hanley, Worcestershire. He was educated at Winchester College, before going up to Christ Church, Oxford.

A member of the Inner Temple, he was called to the bar in January 1854. Benson played first-class cricket for the Marylebone Cricket Club (MCC) in 1855, against Oxford University at Oxford. Batting once in the match, he was run out for 2 runs in the MCC first innings. In addition to playing first-class cricket, Benson also played minor matches for Shropshire. He held the roles of recorder of Shrewsbury from 1866 to 1879 and was a Metropolitan Police magistrate at Southwark Crown Court from 1867 to 1879. He was additionally a justice of the peace for Shropshire and the Liberty of the Tower. Benson was a member of the Carlton Club.

He died at his Montagu Square residence following a prolonged illness in March 1886. He was married to Selina Henrietta Cockerell, daughter of the cricketer Louis Cockerell. His granddaughter was the novelist and travel writer Stella Benson.
