= Walter Marcon =

English cleric and cricketer

Personal information
- Born: 28 March 1824; Swaffham, Norfolk, England
- Died: 14 November 1875 (aged 51); Edgefield, Norfolk, England
- Batting: Right-handed
- Bowling: Right-arm fast
- Role: Bowler

Domestic team information
- Years: Team
- 1843–1844: Oxford University

Walter Marcon (28 March 1824 – 14 November 1875) was an English cleric, noted as a cricketer who played six matches for Oxford University in 1843 and 1844. He had previously established a reputation for extremely fast bowling at Eton College.

== Schools cricket ==
Born at Swaffham, Norfolk, Marcon played for the Eton College First XI in 1841 and 1842, alongside another fast bowler, Harvey Fellows. Marcon bowled so fast that three long stops were needed, even though the wicketkeeper stood well back. WG Grace said that "Harvey W Fellows and W Marcon were two of the fastest and best...I do not think that Fellows or Marcon would now be allowed to bowl. Few people nowadays realise how fast they bowled."

In his book Cricket, W. G. Grace wrote that Marcon's deliveries would smash a stump if making a direct hit without bouncing first; he reported his father saying that he "could hardly trace the ball" when fielding at point. Marcon once bowled a ball that knocked the bat out of the batsman's hands and through the wicket.

== First-class career ==
Despite his reputation as a bowler, Marcon took no known wickets in his career. Bowling analyses were rarely compiled at the time, and bowlers were not credited with wickets which fell to catches.

Marcon went up to Worcester College, Oxford, in 1842, and joined the Oxford University Cricket Club in 1843, making his debut against Marylebone Cricket Club (MCC) on 24 May at Bullingdon Green, near Oxford. Batting third, he scored 2 in the first innings and was run out for a duck in the second. That was his only match in 1843.

In 1844, he played against MCC at the Magdalen College Ground on 30 May, scoring 15 and 5. He then played for the West of England at Lord's on 24 June, making no score in either innings. He scored another duck followed by his career best 29 playing for Oxford against MCC at Lord's on 27 June.

In the University Match against Cambridge at Lord's on 4 July, Marcon scored 24 and eight not out. His final match was for the West of England against MCC at Bath on 5 August, when he scored two and was not out without scoring in the second innings. His bowling analysis was recorded in this match: he took no wickets for eight runs from forty balls.

== Later life ==
Marcon abandoned cricket after he left Oxford to become a vicar in Cornwall and eventually the Rector of Edgefield in his native Norfolk. He married Caroline Eliza Hayes Middleton in about 1847, and they had seven children. Walter Marcon died in Edgefield in 1875. The couple's eldest child, also called Walter, succeeded his father as Rector of Edgefield and served there from the 1870s to the 1930s.
