= John Scobell (cricketer) =

English cricketer

Personal information
- Full name: John Frederick Scobell
- Born: 22 February 1844; Plymouth, Devon, England
- Died: 8 July 1898 (aged 54); St Leonards-on-Sea, Sussex, England
- Batting: Right-handed

Domestic team information
- Years: Team
- 1865–1867: Oxford University

Career statistics
Competition	First-class
Matches	4
Runs scored	73
Batting average	12.16
100s/50s	0/0
Top score	44
Balls bowled	32
Wickets	0
Bowling average	–
5 wickets in innings	–
10 wickets in match	–
Best bowling	–
Catches/stumpings	2/–
- Source: Cricinfo, 16 April 2020

John Frederick Scobell (22 February 1844 – 8 July 1898) was an English first-class cricketer and clergyman.

The son of John Edmund Scobell, he was born at Plymouth in February 1844. He was educated at Marlborough College, before going up to Lincoln College, Oxford. While studying at Oxford, he played first-class cricket for Oxford University in 1865–67, making four appearances. He scored 73 runs in his four matches, with a high score of 44.

After graduating from Oxford, Scobell took holy orders in the Church of England. He was a chaplain in the British Indian Army at Calcutta from 1873, before returning to England where he was vicar of St John the Baptist's Church, Bognor until his death in 1898 at St Leonards-on-Sea.
