= Edward Hewetson =

English cricketer (1902–1977)

Personal information
- Full name: Edward Pearson Hewetson
- Born: 27 May 1902; Metchley House, Edgbaston, Birmingham, Warwickshire
- Died: 26 December 1977 (aged 75); Bampton, Oxfordshire
- Batting: Right-handed
- Bowling: Right-arm fast

Domestic team information
- Years: Team
- 1919–1927: Warwickshire
- 1922–1925: Oxford University

Career statistics
Competition	First-class
Matches	66
Runs scored	1,213
Batting average	14.44
100s/50s	0/4
Top score	66
Balls bowled	4,169
Wickets	163
Bowling average	25.57
5 wickets in innings	6
10 wickets in match	1
Best bowling	5/16
Catches/stumpings	41/–
- Source: CricInfo, 8 October 2022

Edward Pearson Hewetson (27 May 1902 – 26 December 1977) was an English cricketer who played first-class cricket between 1919 and 1934 for Oxford University and Warwickshire. A right-arm fast bowler and right-handed batsman, Hewetson took 163 wickets in his career, and scored 1,213 runs at a batting average of 14.44. He played twenty-nine matches for Warwickshire between 1919 and 1927, joining Oxford in 1922 and playing there until 1925. He played for Harlequins Cricket Club until 1927, and then for the Free Foresters Cricket Club until 1934. An alumnus of Shrewsbury School, he also played for them during his school years, and in 1920 he played at Lord's for a Lord's School XI against 'The Rest', taking a nine-wicket haul with the ball.
