= Stirling Voules =

English cricketer, educator, and clergyman

Personal information
- Full name: Stirling Cookesley Voules
- Born: 4 January 1843; Middle Chinnock, Somerset, England
- Died: 6 May 1923 (aged 80); Maida Hill, London, England
- Batting: Right-handed
- Bowling: Right-arm roundarm fast

Domestic team information
- Years: Team
- 1863–1866: Oxford University
- 1865: Marylebone Cricket Club

Career statistics
Competition	First-class
Matches	24
Runs scored	664
Batting average	19.52
100s/50s	–/2
Top score	78
Balls bowled	1,363
Wickets	40
Bowling average	14.88
5 wickets in innings	3
10 wickets in match	–
Best bowling	7/26
Catches/stumpings	24/–
- Source: Cricinfo, 13 August 2019

Stirling Cookesley Voules (4 January 1843 – 6 May 1923) was an English first-class cricketer, educator and clergyman.

The son of the Reverend Francis Plimley Voules, he was born in January 1843 at Middle Chinnock, Somerset. He was educated at Marlborough College, where he captained the college cricket team. From Marlborough he studied at Lincoln College, Oxford. His debut in first-class cricket came for the Gentlemen of the South against the Gentlemen of the North at The Oval in 1862. He debuted for Oxford University the following year against the Marylebone Cricket Club (MCC) at Oxford. He played first-class cricket for Oxford until 1866, making sixteen appearances. Playing as an all-rounder, Voules scored 423 runs in his sixteen matches at an average of 19.22 and a high score of 56. With his right-arm roundarm fast bowling, he took 29 wickets at a bowling average of 10.75, with best figures of 7 for 26. These figures, one of two five wicket hauls that he took for Oxford, came against Cambridge in a match winning performance in The University Match of 1863. Voules gained a blue in cricket while playing for Oxford in his freshman year. During his time at Oxford, he also played first-class cricket for the Gentlemen on three occasions between 1863–66 in the Gentlemen v Players fixture, and for the Gentlemen of England and the MCC once each in 1865.

He graduated in 1866 and shortly after became a priest in the Church of England. Voules made his final appearance in first-class cricket in 1867, when he played for Southgate against Oxford University. Prior to taking a clerical post with the church, Voules was employed as a schoolteacher. He was an assistant master at Rossall School in 1869, before becoming an assistant master at Marlborough College in 1873. He was appointed as the principle of Sydney College, Bath in 1874, holding the post until 1879. He took a clerical position as the rector of Ashley in 1879, a position he held until 1894. He moved to Yorkshire in 1894, where he took up the position of rector at Rise. In 1900, Voules returned to Bristol, where he was the rector of Keynsham until 1908. He later served on the council of Marlborough College in 1913. Voules died in London at Maida Hill in May 1923. His brother was Sir Gordon Blennerhassett Voules, a clerk to the admiralty.
