= Bulmer de Sales La Terriere =

British army officer (1856–1925)

- Born: Fenwick Bulmer de Sales La Terriere; Alstone, Cheltenham, Gloucestershire, England
- Died: 23 June 1925 (aged 69); London, England, UK
- Occupations: Soldier and author
- Years active: 1877–1925
- Children: Lieut-Colonel Howard Montague Bulmer de Sales La Terriere

Fenwick Bulmer de Sales La Terriere (1856–1925) was a Colonel of the British Army, Knight of the Order of the Medjidie, a member of the French nobility, and an author.

He was born at Alstone Lawn in Gloucestershire, educated at Eton College, Magdalen College, Oxford and at the Royal Military Academy Sandhurst. He claimed to be descended from the French aristocracy, namely the Comte de Sales de Saint Salvy.

He joined the army, serving in the 5th Battalion Royal Fusiliers, and later as Captain of the 18th Hussars. He gained the rank of Lieutenant-colonel. From 18 January 1902, he was an Exon of the King's Body Guard of the Yeomen of the Guard.

In 1924, de Sales La Terriere's autobiography, Days that Are Gone, being the Recollections of some Seventy Years of the Life of a very ordinary Gentleman and his Friends in Three Reigns was published. The autobiography received favourable reviews in The Times shortly after its publication. De Sales La Terriere was a luminary of fashionable society at the time, although the Oscholars Library called his opinions of Oscar Wilde "conservative and rather naïve"
