= List of Old Rugbeians =

This is a list of Old Rugbeians, former students of Rugby School in Rugby, Warwickshire, England.

== Academia ==
- L.A. Adamson, Headmaster of Wesley College, Melbourne
- Donald Beves (1896–1961), English modern linguist
- R. G. Collingwood, English historian and Professor of Metaphysics at the University of Oxford
- Richard Congreve (1818–1899), English philosopher
- Marcus Flather, Clinical Professor in Medicine at the University of East Anglia
- Henry Watson Fowler, English lexicographer, author of Fowler's Modern English Usage
- T. H. Green, moral and political philosopher and reformer
- R. M. Hare, English moral philosopher
- Fenton John Anthony Hort, English theologian
- F. L. Lucas, Reader in English Literature at the University of Cambridge, scholar, critic and writer
- Edward Ellis Morris, Educationist, second Headmaster of Melbourne Grammar School (1875–83), and miscellaneous writer
- Edward Samuel Morris (1940–2016), art historian
- Frederick York Powell, Regius Professor of Modern History (Oxford)
- Henry John Stephen Smith, Irish mathematician
- Jon Stallworthy, Professor of English at the University of Oxford
- Sir Percy Sykes soldier, diplomat, writer and scholar
- Richard Henry Tawney, one of Britain's leading Christian Socialist thinkers and writers, and a prominent British economic and social historian
- Henry Wace, Principal of King's College London (1883–1897), former Dean of Canterbury
- Wynne Godley, economist
- Sir Will Spens, educationalist and Master of Corpus Christi College, Cambridge (1927-1952)
- Sir Hew Francis Anthony Strachan, Chichele Professor of the History of War

== Military ==
- Field Marshal Sir Archibald James Cassels, former Chief of the General Staff & Commander-in-Chief of the British Army of the Rhine
- Admiral Granville Proby, 3rd Earl of Carysfort, fought during the French Revolutionary and Napoleonic Wars
- Admiral Sir Geoffrey Oliver, British officer during the Second World War
- Admiral Sir Guy Grantham, Vice Chief of the Naval Staff; Commander-in-Chief, Mediterranean Fleet; Commander-in-Chief, Portsmouth and Governor of Malta
- General Arthur Clifton, general who was a regimental commander during the Napoleonic Wars, and took over command of the Union Brigade during the Battle of Waterloo
- General Sir Ivor Maxse, General Officer Commanding XVIII Corps during World War I; renown for his innovative and effective training methods
- General Sir James Marshall-Cornwall, General Officer Commanding, British Troops in Egypt during World War II
- General Sir George Giffard, Commander-in-Chief, 11th Army Group in World War II
- General Sir Thomas Astley Cubitt, commanded 57th Brigade and then 38th (Welsh) Division during World War I and later was appointed Governor of Bermuda
- General Sir Harold Edmund Franklyn, General Officer Commanding, 5th Infantry Division during the withdrawal to Dunkirk & later Commander-in-Chief, Home Forces
- General John Proby, 2nd Earl of Carysfort, British General during the French Revolutionary and Napoleonic Wars; also a Whig politician
- General Sir Richard Wakefield Goodbody, Commander-in-Chief, Northern Command and Adjutant General
- General Sir Horatio Shirley, fought in the Crimean War
- Vice Admiral Sir Ian Corder, UK Military Representative to NATO
- Lieutenant General Sir Ralph Abercromby, General during the French Revolutionary and Napoleonic Wars who was Commander-in-Chief, Ireland; he was also MP for Clackmannanshire, and Governor of Trinidad
- Lieutenant General William Augustus Johnson, fought as a junior officer in the French Revolutionary and Napoleonic Wars
- Lieutenant General Arthur Ernest Percival, the General Officer Commanding, Malaya during World War II who surrendered Singapore to the Imperial Japanese Army
- Lieutenant General Sir Henry Royds Pownall, former Vice Chief of the Imperial General Staff & Chief of Staff for the British Expeditionary Force during the Battle of France
- Lieutenant General Henry Andrew Sarel fought in the Indian Mutiny and Second Opium War; later Lieutenant Governor of Guernsey
- Lieutenant General Jonathan Peel, general and politician
- Lieutenant General Henry Hope Crealock, commanded a division in the Anglo-Zulu War
- Lieutenant General Sir Lewis Pelly, East India Company army officer and Conservative MP
- Lieutenant General Sir Charles Arbuthnot, Commander-in-Chief, Bombay Army and Commander-in-Chief, Madras Army
- Lieutenant General Sir Robin Carnegie, a former Military Secretary
- Lieutenant General Timothy Radford, current Commander, Allied Rapid Reaction Corps
- Lieutenant General Willoughby Cotton Commander-in-Chief, Bombay Army
- Major-General Sir George Forestier-Walker, commanded 21st Division and 27th Division on the Western Front and as part of the British Salonika Army during World War I
- Major-General William Donovan Stamer, commanded 161st Infantry Brigade, Sudan Defence Force and 131st Infantry Brigade during World War II
- Major-General Sir Charles Sim Bremridge Parsons, Commander of the British Troops in Canada
- Major-General Sir Harcourt Mortimer Bengough, fought in the Crimean War, Anglo-Zulu War and Third Anglo-Burmese War
- Major-General Sir William Eyre, commanded 3rd Brigade and later 3rd Division in the Crimean War; later Commander-in-Chief, North America
- Major-General Sir Ernest Dunlop Swinton, instrumental in the development of the tank
- Major-General Philip de Fonblanque, commanded the Lines of Communication for the British Expeditionary Force during the Battle of France
- Major-General Geoffrey Bruce, Deputy Chief of Staff of the British Indian Army; also a member of the 1922 British Mount Everest expedition and 1924 British Mount Everest expedition
- Major-General Horatio Pettus Mackintosh Berney-Ficklin, Divisional Commander in Persia, Iraq, Madagascar and Italy during World War II
- Major General John Fielden Brocklehurst, 1st Baron Ranksborough
- Major-General Sir William Godwin Michelmore, commanded Devon and Cornwall County Division, 77th Infantry Division and 45th Holding Division during World War II; later Lord Mayor of Exeter
- Major-General Victor Campbell
- Air Vice Marshal Augustus Henry Orlebar, British Army and Royal Air Force officer who served in both world wars
- Brigadier-General Sir Percy Molesworth Sykes, soldier, diplomat, and scholar with a considerable literary output
- Brigadier-General John Tyson Wigan, commanded 12th Cavalry Brigade. After the war he was the MP for Abingdon, 1918–1921
- Brigadier-General George MacLeay Macarthur-Onslow, commanded 5th Light Horse Brigade of the Australian Army during World War I
- Brigadier-General Sir Alexander Gibb, Chief Engineer Ports Construction to the British Army in France and Civil Engineer-in-Chief to the Admiralty
- Brigadier-General Anthony Courage, Regimental Colonel of the 15th/19th The King's Royal Hussars.
- Brigadier Philip Bowden-Smith, Commander of 125th Infantry Brigade which later became 10th Armoured Brigade; he also represented Great Britain at the 1924 Olympic Games
- Brigadier Raymond Ladais Sandover, Commander 2/11th Battalion (Australia) and 6th Australian Infantry Brigade
- Colonel Sir Henry Wilmot, 5th Baronet, awarded the Victoria Cross during the Indian Mutiny
- Colonel Osmond Barnes, Chief Herald of the Indian Empire
- Colonel Lionel Beaumont-Thomas, British Army officer during both World Wars and Conservative Member of Parliament for Birmingham King's Norton
- Colonel James Duff Army Officer who fought in the Crimean War and later became a Conservative MP
- Colonel Evan Henry Llewellyn, commander of the 2nd (Central African) Battalion, King's African Rifles
- Colonel Robin Evelegh, British Army officer who authored 'Peace-Keeping in a Democratic Society'
- William Proby, Lord Proby, a British Royal Navy officer and Whig politician
- Lieutenant Colonel Christopher Bushell, won the Victoria Cross and Distinguished Service Order during World War I
- Lieutenant-Colonel Gerald Rufus Isaacs, 2nd Marquess of Reading, Liberal then Conservative politician and barrister who fought in World War I
- Lieutenant-Colonel Kanwar Shumshere Singh, doctor in the Indian Medical Service
- Lieutenant-Colonel Alexander "Alec" Ogilvie, early aviation pioneer
- Lieutenant Colonel Henry Bruce, 2nd Baron Aberdare, British officer during the First World War
- Lieutenant Commander Robert Selby Armitage, won both the George Cross and George Medal for his bomb disposal work during the Second World War
- Lieutenant Commander John Bryan Peter Duppa-Miller, Royal Navy officer who was awarded the George Cross for bomb disposal work during the Blitz
- Major Arthur Willan Keen, British World War I flying ace credited with fourteen aerial victories
- William Hodson, commander during the 1857 Indian mutiny and founder of Hodson's Horse
- Major Bruce Shand, officer in the British Army and father of Camilla, HRH The Duchess of Cornwall
- Squadron Leader William Spurrett Fielding-Johnson MC and Bar, DFC, army officer in World War I before joining the RFC and RAF in both World Wars
- Squadron Leader Hedley Fowler, RAF officer who escaped from Colditz
- Captain John Norwood won the Victoria Cross during World War I
- Captain Charles Roger Lupton, British World War I flying ace credited with five aerial victories
- Captain Kenneth Barbour Montgomery, British World War I flying ace credited with twelve aerial victories
- Lieutenant Frank Alexander de Pass, the first Jew and the first officer of the Indian Army to receive the Victoria Cross during World War I
- Lieutenant Alfred Gordon Clark, won the Victoria Cross during World War I
- Lieutenant Arthur Conolly, British Officer in 6th Bengal Native Light Cavalry. Coined the phrase 'The Great Game'
- Lieutenant Donald Hankey, wrote two volumes of essays about the British volunteer army in World War I both titled 'A Student in Arms'
- Sir James Arnold Stacey Cleminson
- Edmund Musgrave Barttelot, British Army officer who was part of Henry Stanley's Emin Pasha Relief Expedition of 1886-89
- Henry Ward, 5th Viscount Bangor British Army Officer who fought in the Xhosa Wars

== Aviation ==
- Christopher Orlebar, British Concorde pilot, aviation lecturer and writer
- John Gillespie Magee, Junior, Anglo-American poet and aviator

== Building, engineering and architecture ==
- Sir Charles Brett, architectural historian
- Will Butler-Adams, managing director of Brompton Bicycle Limited
- William Grierson, civil engineer
- Sir Charles Nicholson, ecclesiastical designer and architect
- David Ogle, industrial designer and car designer
- Thomas Henry Poole, architect of numerous churches and schools in New York City
- Reid Railton, automotive engineer and designer of land and water speed record vehicles
- Sir Harry Ricardo, designer of the internal combustion engine and patentee of the two-stroke engine
- Clement E. Stretton, consulting engineer and author.

== Business ==
- William Henry Goschen (1870-1943) KBE, businessman and banker
- Richard Jewson, businessman and Lord Lieutenant of Norfolk
- Charles Tertius Mander, first baronet, manufacturer, public servant and philanthropist.
- Clive Schlee, businessman, CEO of Pret a Manger
- Nusli Wadia, businessman, Chairman of the Wadia Group, son of Neville Wadia and Dina Wadia, grandson of Muhammad Ali Jinnah and Rattanbai Jinnah

== Civil Service ==
- Sir Christopher Bullock, Permanent Under-Secretary at the Air Ministry
- Sir Bertram Blakiston Cubitt, civil servant in the War Office
- Sir George Coldstream, Permanent Secretary to the Lord Chancellor's Office
- Sir Arthur Franks, Chief of the Secret Intelligence Service
- Sir Ernest Gowers, civil servant and author of The Complete Plain Words
- Sir Godfrey Lushington, Permanent Under-Secretary of the Home Office 1886–1895; championed prison reform
- Sir Nicholas Montagu, Chairman of H.M. Inland Revenue, 1997–2004
- Maurice Hankey, 1st Baron Hankey, Secretary to the Committee of Imperial Defence; and 1st Cabinet Secretary
- J. M. Bruce Lockhart, intelligence officer

== Colonial Service and imperial administration ==
- Sir Alexander John Arbuthnot, colonial administrator and writer
- Crawford Murray MacLehose, Baron MacLehose of Beoch, the 25th Governor of Hong Kong
- Sir Jervoise Athelstane Baines, member of the Indian Civil Service
- Sir Henry Conway Belfield, Resident of Negeri Sembilan; Resident of Selangor; British Resident of Perak and finally Governor of the British East Africa Protectorate
- Maurice Collis colonial administrator in Burma; later a writer on South-East Asia
- Arthur Conolly (1807–1842), captain in the East India Company's service
- Henry Valentine Conolly, member of the Indian Civil Service
- The Honourable Sir Ashley Eden, Chief Commissioner of British Crown Colony of Burma and Lieutenant-Governor of Bengal
- Sir Thomas Douglas Forsyth, Administrator of the British Raj
- Patrick William Forbes, Commander of the British South Africa Police, who invaded Matabeland in the First Matabele War; later Magistrate of Mashonaland 1893–1894; Administrator of North-Western Rhodesia 1895–1897
- Sir Robert Allason Furness, classicist and representative of the British Council in Egypt, 1945-1950
- Sir Henry Paul HarveyKCMG, Egyptian Financial Advisor from 1907 to 1912 and 1919–1920
- Sir Frederick James Halliday, first Lieutenant-Governor of Bengal
- Stephen Rumbold Lushington, Governor of Madras 1827–1832 and Tory politician
- Leonard Fielding Nalder colonial administrator who served as Governor of Fung Province 1927–1930 and Mongalla province 1930–1936 in Anglo-Egyptian Sudan
- James Alexander Richey, educational administrator in South Africa and India
- Sir Richard Temple, 1st Baronet, Lieutenant-Governor of Bengal 1874–1877; Governor of Bombay 1877–1880 and also an MP
- Sir Theodore Cracraft Hope, civil servant of the Government of India, including Public Works
- Sir George Chardin Denton, Governor of Gambia
- John Loader Maffey, 1st Baron Rugby, Chief Commissioner of the North-West Frontier Province; Governor-General of the Sudan; and Permanent Under-Secretary of State for the Colonies
- John Arthur Godley, 1st Baron Kilbracken, Permanent Under-Secretary of State for India 1883–1909
- Sir William Frederick Gowers, Governor of Uganda
- John Claude White, Deputy Commissioner of the Tibet Frontier Commission

== Diplomatic Service ==
- Sir Charles Bagot, diplomat and administrator
- Sir Thomas Bromley, Ambassador to Somalia, Syria, Algeria & Ethiopia
- Sir Julian Bullard, Ambassador to West Germany
- Arthur Nicolson, 1st Baron Carnock, Ambassador to Spain; to Russia and finally Permanent Under Secretary for Foreign Affairs
- Richard Émile Augustin de Candolle, Consul to the Canton of Geneva
- Baron Charles de Chassiron, Vice Marshal of the Diplomatic Corps, 2001–2006
- Sir Leycester Coltman, Ambassador to Cuba from 1991 to 1994 and to Colombia 1994–1998; author of The Real Fidel Castro
- Sir John Coulson, Ambassador to Sweden and Secretary-General of the European Free Trade Association
- Sir Moore Crosthwaite, Ambassador to Lebanon and to Sweden
- Sir Patrick Henry Dean, Permanent Representative to the UN 1960–1964; Ambassador to the United States 1965–1969 and also Chairman of the Joint Intelligence Committee
- Sir Henry Drummond Wolff, High Commissioner to Egypt; Envoy Extraordinary and Minister Plenipotentiary to Teheran; and Ambassador to Spain; also a Conservative Politician
- Sir Ewen Fergusson, Principal Private Secretary to the Foreign Secretary 1975–1978; Ambassador to South Africa 1982–1984 and to France 1987–1992
- Sir Anthony Figgis, Ambassador to Austria 1996–2000; Marshal of the Diplomatic Corps 2001–2008 and the current Gentleman Usher of the Blue Rod
- Sir Edward Goschen, 1st Baronet, Ambassador to Serbia, to Denmark, to Austria-Hungary and to Germany; later Gentleman Usher to the Sword of State
- Robert Hankey, 2nd Baron Hankey, Ambassador to Sweden 1954–1960
- Hon. Richard Gilbert Hare Head of Russian propaganda, Ministry of Information, WW2
- Sir James Hudson, Ambassador to Turin
- Augustus Henry Mounsey, Minister Resident and Consul General to Colombia
- Sir Owen O'Malley, Minister to Hungary 1939–1941; British ambassador to the Polish government in exile during World War II; and Ambassador to Portugal 1945–1957
- Sir Maurice Peterson, Minister to Bulgaria 1936–1938; Ambassador to Iraq 1938–1939; to Spain 1939–1940; to Turkey 1944–1946 and to Russia 1946–1949
- Sir Frank Roberts, Ambassador to Yugoslavia, 1954–1957; Permanent Representative on the North Atlantic Council 1957–1960; Ambassador to the USSR 1960–1962; to West Germany 1963–1968
- Ian Samuel, diplomat and RAF officer during World War II
- Sir William Seeds, Ambassador to Brazil 1930–1935; and Ambassador to Russia 1939–1940
- Sir Alan Urwick, Ambassador to Jordan 1979–1984; to Egypt 1985–1987; British High Commissioner to Canada 1987–1989 and Serjeant-at-Arms of the House of Commons 1989–1995
- Sir Charles Richard Vaughan, Minister to Switzerland 1823–1825 and Minister to the United States 1825–1835
- Sir Peter Wilkinson, Ambassador to Vietnam in 1966–1967; also a SOE agent during World War II
- Sir Michael S. Williams, Ambassador to Guatemala 1962–1963; and Envoy Extraordinary and Minister Plenipotentiary to the Holy See 1965–1970

== Ecclesiastics ==
- Robert Barbour, lecturer in theology, moderator of the church of Scotland, and holder of the Military Cross
- George Bradley, Dean of Westminster
- Charles Boyd, Archdeacon of Colombo
- Godwin Birchenough, Dean of Ripon Cathedral
- John Bickersteth, Bishop of Bath and Wells and Clerk of the Closet
- Geoffrey Clayton, Archdeacon of Chesterfield; Bishop of Johannesburg and Archbishop of Cape Town
- Thomas Legh Claughton, Bishop of Rochester and Bishop of St Albans.
- George Chase, Master of Selwyn College, Cambridge and Bishop of Ripon
- Reverend William Lucas Collins
- James Cotton, Dean of Bangor
- Francis Cramer-Roberts, Bishop of Nassau and Archdeacon of Blackburn
- Reverend Sir Frederick Larkins Currie, 2nd Baronet
- Edwin Dodgson
- Alan Campbell Don, Chaplain to the Speaker of the House of Commons 1936–1946 and Dean of Westminster 1946–1959
- Nowell Twopeny, Archdeacon of Flinders
- Edward Feild, Bishop of Newfoundland and Archdeacon of Bermuda
- Launcelot Fleming, Anglican Bishop of Portsmouth and Bishop of Norwich
- Rev. Thomas Valpy French, first Bishop of Lahore
- Archibald Ronald Gordon, Anglican Bishop of Portsmouth, Bishop at Lambeth and Bishop to the Forces
- Rupert Hoare, Dean of Liverpool and Bishop of Dudley
- Percy Mark Herbert, the first Bishop of Blackburn; Bishop of Norwich and Clerk of the Closet
- Hugh Hornby, Bishop of Hulme
- Phipps Hornby, Archdeacon of Lancaster
- Rev Francis Jayne, Bishop of Chester and academic
- Thomas Jex-Blake, Dean of Wells also a teacher and Headmaster of Rugby
- Michael Gresford Jones, Bishop of Willesden and Bishop of St Albans
- Edwin Kempson, Bishop of Warrington
- Francis Kilner, Bishop of Richmond
- Carey Knyvett, Archdeacon of Northampton and Bishop of Selby
- William Lake, Dean of Durham
- John Lawton, Archdeacon of Warrington
- Edward Legge, Dean of Windsor and Bishop of Oxford
- William MacKennal, Archdeacon of Ely
- Hugh Montefiore, Bishop of Kingston 1970–1978 and Bishop of Birmingham 1977–1987
- Frank Okell, Bishop of Stockport and Archdeacon of Macclesfield
- Grandage Powell, Archdeacon of Carlisle and Bishop of Penrith
- John Purchas, Church of England priest who was prosecuted for ritualist practices
- Norman Rathbone, Dean of Hereford
- Charles Waldegrave Sandford, Bishop of Gibraltar
- Augustus Shears, clergyman who translated part of the Prayer Book into Burmese
- Walter Waddington Shirley, churchman and ecclesiastical historian
- Richard Fitzgeorge de Stacpoole, 1st Duc de Stacpoole
- Lovelace Stamer, Archdeacon of Stoke and Bishop of Shrewsbury
- Arthur Penrhyn Stanley, English churchman, and Dean of Westminster
- Arthur Stanton Anglo-catholic priest
- John Stott, evangelical minister who later was a curate of All Souls, Langham place and a leading figure involved in drafting the Lausanne Covenant
- Alfred Swann, Dean and Archdeacon of Hong Kong
- Henry Herbert Symonds, Anglican priest who was a driving force behind the creation of National Parks
- Frederick Stephen Temple, Dean of Hong Kong and Bishop of Malmesbury
- William Temple, Bishop of Manchester 1921–29; Archbishop of York 1929–42 and Archbishop of Canterbury 1942–44; an influential radical thinker, and father of the post-war Welfare State
- David Urquhart, Bishop of Birkenhead and the current bishop of Birmingham
- Henry Wace, Dean of Canterbury
- Richard Watson, Bishop of Burnley
- Edward Were, Bishop of Derby 1889–1909, and Bishop of Stafford 1909–1915
- Edward Winnington-Ingram, Archdeacon of Hereford

== Law ==
- Hubert Parker, Baron Parker of Waddington, Lord Chief Justice of England and Wales
- Mark Colville, 4th Viscount Colville of Culross, judge and politician. He was one of the 92 hereditary peers elected to remain in the House of Lords after the House of Lords Act 1999.
- Charles Bowen, 1st Baron Bowen, Lord of Appeal in Ordinary
- Horace Davey, Baron Davey, Lord of Appeal in Ordinary
- David Hope, Baron Hope of Craighead, Lord of Appeal in Ordinary
- Sir Edward Marshall-Hall, English barrister and orator
- Sir Michael Kerry, former HM Procurator General and Treasury Solicitor
- Robert Barton, Irish lawyer and statesman who worked on the Anglo-Irish Treaty
- Major Sir Thomas Hetherington, barrister and first head of the Crown Prosecution Service
- Edmund Yorke, Legal scholar and barrister
- Sir Robert Akenhead, High Court Judge and Head of the Technology and Construction Court
- Wilfred Baugh Allen, judge
- Sir Lewis Cave, judge
- Sir George Farwell, Lord Justice of Appeal
- Sir James Edmund Sandford Fawcett, barrister and member of the European Commission for Human Rights
- Alfred Gordon Clark, judge
- Charles Sprengel Greaves
- Philip Guedalla, barrister
- Sir Alfred van Waterschoodt Lucie-Smith, colonial judge who became Chief Justice of Trinidad and Tobago
- Roundell Palmer, 1st Earl of Selborne, Lord Chancellor 1872–1874 & 1880–1885; Attorney General for England and Wales 1863–1866; and Solicitor General for England and Wales 1861–1863
- Sir Lawrence Peel, Advocate-General of Bengal and Chief Justice of Bengal
- Cuthbert Snowball Rewcastle, county court judge and liberal party politician
- Thomas Bateman Napier county court judge and politician
- John Sandford, judicial commissioner of Burma and Mysore
- Sir Leslie Frederic Scott, Lord Justice of Appeal and Liberal MP
- Patrick Spens, 1st Baron Spens, Chief Justice of India
- Roger John Laugharne Thomas, Baron Thomas of Cwmgiedd, President of the Queen's Bench Division and the current Lord Chief Justice of England and Wales
- Jonathan David Chattyn Turner, barrister specialising in intellectual property and competition law
- Dudley Ward, New Zealand judge and politician

== Literature ==
- Matthew Arnold, Victorian poet and critic (son of Headmaster Dr Thomas Arnold)
- Rupert Brooke, English poet
- Arthur Hugh Clough, English poet
- Charles Lutwidge Dodgson, better known as Lewis Carroll, famous for Alice's Adventures in Wonderland
- Richard Doyle, English author
- Dominic Hibberd, English critic and biographer
- Anthony Horowitz, English writer
- Edmund George Valpy Knox, editor of Punch
- Walter Savage Landor, English writer and poet
- Wyndham Lewis, British painter and author
- John Gillespie Magee, Junior, Anglo-American poet and aviator
- Arthur Ransome, British children's author
- Mario Reading, author
- Sir Salman Rushdie, author and essayist, Booker Prize winner for Midnight's Children. Said of his time: "Almost the only thing I am proud of about going to Rugby school was that Lewis Carroll went there too."
- J.K. Stanford, English author
- Francis Stuart, IRA member, Nazi collaborator and Irish novelist.
- Thomas Hughes, English lawyer and author of Tom Brown's Schooldays
- Major Geoffrey Cecil Gilbert McNeill-Moss British army officer and novelist

== Media, entertainment and the arts ==
- Charles Acton, music critic at The Irish Times
- Dolly Alderton, author
- Faris Badwan, aka Faris Rotter, vocalist from band The Horrors
- Roy Beddington, painter, illustrator, author, and journalist
- Sir Arthur Bliss, composer and conductor. Master of the Queen's Music (1953-75)
- William Bullock, journalist at The Daily News
- Tim Burton, known professionally as Shmee150, car vlogger and YouTuber
- David Carritt (1927–1982), British art historian, dealer and critic
- Charlie Charters, Author, rugby union official, sports executive and journalist
- Tom Cowan/Furse, Bassist from band The Horrors
- Freddie Cowan, Guitarist from band The Vaccines
- Frank Barrington Craig, British portrait painter
- David Croft, (born David Sharland) Television writer, producer and director
- David Haig, English actor and writer
- Arthur fforde, BBC chairman
- Isabel Fay, comedy actress and writer
- Dan Haigh, bassist, Fightstar, Gunship (band)
- Robert Hardy, English stage and film actor
- John Hawkesworth, television producer, Upstairs, Downstairs
- Sir Charles Hawtrey, Victorian era stage actor
- Marmaduke Hussey, BBC chairman
- Hugh Johnson, British wine writer
- Pete Kember, musician, Spacemen 3
- John Kentish, English operatic tenor
- Wyndham Lewis, British painter and author
- Richard Hey Lloyd, British organist and composer
- William Charles Macready, English stage actor
- Robin Milford, British musician
- Sydney Nicholson, British musician
- Sir Anthony Quayle, British actor
- Andrew Rawnsley, British political journalist
- Andy Richards, British / Australian musician, composer and organist
- Adnan Sami, singer, pianist, actor and composer
- F. H. S. Shepherd, painter
- Richard Talbot Kelly, soldier and artist
- Alex Westaway, guitarist and singer, Fightstar, Gunship (band)
- A. N. Wilson, English writer and newspaper columnist
- Sophie Xeon, Singer and musician

== Medicine and science ==
- William Bateson, English geneticist
- Miles Joseph Berkeley, English botanist
- Humphry Bowen, British botanist and chemist
- Dr Peter Brinsden, fertility expert
- Abel Chapman, big game hunter and naturalist who started South Africa's first game reserve
- Alex Hankey, English theoretical physicist
- Walter W. Holland, public health physician
- Andrew Karney, scientist, chartered engineer, businessman and entrepreneur
- Sir Geoffrey Langdon Keynes, physician and scholar, brother of economist John Maynard Keynes
- Sir Philip Henry Manson-Bahr, zoologist and Doctor of Medicine
- David Marr, British psychologist
- Donald Michie, British researcher in artificial intelligence who during World War II, worked for the Government Code and Cypher School at Bletchley Park, to break "Tunny", a German teleprinter cipher
- George Mitchell Seabroke, British astronomer
- Frederick Courteney Selous, British explorer, officer, hunter, and conservationist, known for his exploits in South-East Africa
- Sir George Augustus William Shuckburgh-Evelyn, 6th Baronet, won the Copley Medal
- Nevil Sidgwick, English theoretical chemist
- E. Barton Worthington (1905-2001), ecologist and science administrator
- Babulal Sethia, President of the Royal Society of Medicine and cardiac surgeon

== Politics ==
- Richard Baker Wingfield-Baker, Liberal Party MP
- Leonard Behrens Liberal Party Politician
- William Noel-Hill, 3rd Baron Berwick, Tory politician and British Minister to Sardinia
- Sir Thomas Birch, 2nd Baronet Whig politician
- Sir Noël Vansittart Bowater, 2nd Baronet, Lord Mayor of London
- Sir Orlando Bridgeman, 2nd Baronet Whig politician
- Arthur Montagu Brookfield Conservative Politician, diplomat and army officer
- Sir William Cunliffe Brooks, 1st Baronet, Conservative Politician
- Esmond Bulmer, Conservative MP
- Marston Clarke Buszard Liberal Party MP and barrister
- William John Dalzell Burnyeat, Liberal Party politician
- Charles Howard, 10th Earl of Carlisle Liberal Unionist politician and army officer
- Sir Thomas Cave, 5th Baronet, politician and lawyer
- Harold Cawley Liberal Party MP, killed in World War I
- Oswald Cawley Liberal Party MP, killed in World War I
- Austen Chamberlain, British statesman and recipient of the Nobel Peace Prize
- Neville Chamberlain, politician and former Prime Minister
- Sir Sydney Chapman, Conservative Member of Parliament (MP) for Birmingham Handsworth and Chipping Barnet
- James Thomas, 1st Viscount Cilcennin, Conservative MP and First Lord of the Admiralty
- Samuel Clowes, Conservative politician
- Herbert James Craig Liberal politician
- Sir George Crewe, 8th Baronet Tory politician
- William John Evelyn, Conservative politician
- Sir Frederick William Fison, 1st Baronet, Conservative politician
- Charles Berkeley, 3rd Baron FitzHardinge, Liberal politician
- Tetley Gant, Tasmanian politician and Chancellor University of Tasmania
- Euan Geddes, 3rd Baron Geddes, Current Deputy Speaker in the House of Lords
- Sir Richard Gilpin, 1st Baronet, Conservative Politician and Lieutenant Colonel in the British Army
- George Goschen, 1st Viscount Goschen, Liberal Unionist politician; served as Chancellor of the Exchequer 1887–1892, First Lord of the Admiralty 1871–1874 and 1895–1900
- Captain Alan Graham Conservative politician
- Frank Gray, inter-war Liberal politician
- The Honourable Ronald Greville, Conservative MP
- Lieutenant-Colonel Sir Arthur Sackville Trevor Griffith-Boscawen Conservative politician
- Sir Jeremy James Hanley, Conservative MP; Chairman of the Conservative Party 1994–1995 and Minister without portfolio 1994–1995
- Sir Reginald Hanson, Conservative politician and Lord Mayor of London
- Henry Harland Unionist politician
- William Harrison-Broadley Conservative MP
- Edward John Littleton, 1st Baron Hatherton, Canningite Tory and later Whig politician, Chief Secretary for Ireland, also a major Staffordshire landowner, farmer and businessman
- Sir Arthur Adlington Haworth, 1st Baronet, Liberal politician
- Sir Hubert Douglas Henderson Liberal political advisor and economist
- Charles Hendry, British politician and the Conservative Member of Parliament for Wealden
- William Holbech Member of Parliament for Banbury
- Edward Horsman, MP and Chief Secretary for Ireland
- Alan Howarth, Baron Howarth of Newport, Labour Party politician
- Frederick Curzon, 7th Earl Howe, Conservative minister and Deputy Leader of the House of Lords
- Thomas Gair Ashton, 1st Baron Ashton of Hyde, Edwardian Liberal Party politician and industrialist
- Colonel Herbert Merton Jessel, 1st Baron Jessel, Liberal Unionist and later Conservative politician; the third Mayor of Westminster
- Lieutenant Colonel Sir Edgar Mayne Keatinge Soldier who was a Conservative politician
- Wilfred Byng Kenrick, Lord Mayor of Birmingham and industrialist
- Tom King, Baron King of Bridgwater, Conservative Party politician
- William Kingan, Unionist politician
- Henry King-Tenison, 8th Earl of Kingston, Irish peer and Victorian Conservative Party politician
- Isaac Cowley Lambert Conservative MP and solicitor
- Ian Lang, Baron Lang of Monkton, Conservative Party politician
- Francis Charles Lawley Liberal party politician and journalist
- Henry Lefroy, Western Australian politician
- Colonel Evan Henry Llewellyn Conservative politician
- William Lyttelton, 3rd Baron Lyttelton Whig politician
- Miles MacInnes Liberal MP and railway director
- Sir Charles Tertius Mander, 1st Baronet, four times Mayor of Wolverhampton and an industrialist
- Sir Arthur Markham, 1st Baronet Liberal MP and industrialist
- Angus Maude, Baron Maude of Stratford-upon-Avon, Conservative Party politician and father of Conservative Cabinet member Francis Maude
- George Melly Liberal MP and shipowner
- Arthur Mills Conservative MP
- Charles Mills MP and Director of the East India Company
- Andrew Mitchell, British Conservative politician and Secretary of State for International Development (from May 2010)
- Edmund Morris MP
- George Herbert Morrell Conservative MP and lawyer
- Thomas Bateman Napier Liberal MP and judge
- Sir John Holbrook Osborn Conservative MP
- Francis Otter Liberal MP
- Sukhumbhand Paribatra, Thai politician, 15th Governor of Bangkok
- Sir William Pearce, 2nd Baronet Conservative politician and industrialist
- Jonathan Peel Conservative MP; Surveyor-General of the Ordnance 1841–1846 and Secretary of State for War 1858–1859 & 1866–1867
- Albert Pell Conservative MP and solicitor
- Sir Edward Penton, Mayor of St Marylebone; Superintendent of the Royal Army Clothing Department (Boot Section) 1914–1919 and Chief Inspector of Clothing for the Central Ordnance Depot
- Edwin Berkeley Portman Liberal MP and barrister
- Thomas Bayley Potter Liberal MP
- Walter Powell, Conservative MP and colliery owner
- David Pugh, Liberal MP
- Cuthbert Snowball Rewcastle Liberal politician
- John Bonfoy Rooper MP
- Shane Ross, Irish politicians and journalist
- Henry Bucknall Betterton, 1st Baron Rushcliffe, conservative politician and barrister who was Minister of Labour 1931–1934
- Harold Rushworth New Zealand politician from the County Party
- Sir Henry Bernhard Samuelson, 2nd Baronet Liberal MP
- Sir Leslie Frederic Scott, Lord Justice of Appeal and Liberal MP
- Alexander Craig Sellar MP
- Evelyn Shirley MP
- Walter Shirley Shirley Liberal MP and barrister
- Sir George Augustus William Shuckburgh-Evelyn, 6th Baronet MP, mathematician and astronomer
- Ernest Simon, 1st Baron Simon of Wythenshawe, politician and industrialist
- Sir Thomas Skipwith, 4th Baronet MP
- Samuel George Smith Conservative MP and banker
- Edward Smith Tory MP
- Tim Smith, Liberal Party of Australia member of the Victorian Legislative Assembly
- Richard Spooner MP
- Harry Grey, 4th Earl of Stamford MP and peer
- Edward Henry Stanley, 15th Earl of Derby, prominent 19th century statesman
- Lewis Randle Starkey, Conservative MP
- George Strauss, Baron Strauss, Labour politician and Father of the House of Commons
- Sir Arthur Herbert Drummond Ramsay Steel-Maitland, 1st Baronet Conservative MP, Chairman of the Conservative Party and Minister of Labour
- Charles Hanbury-Tracy, 1st Baron Sudeley Whig politician
- Henry Tancred, 19th-century New Zealand politician.
- Sir John Stradling Thomas, Welsh Conservative Party politician
- Andrew Turner, British Conservative Party politician
- Yevhenia Tymoshenko (Eugenia), Ukrainian entrepreneur and lobbyist on behalf of her mother, former Prime Minister of Ukraine Yulia Tymoshenko
- William Henry Waddington, French statesman (eventually Prime Minister of France)
- Sir George Gustavus Walker, Conservative MP
- Cathcart Wason MP in both New Zealand and Great Britain
- Eugene Wason Liberal MP and lawyer
- Samuel Whitbread, Liberal MP
- Edward Whitley, Conservative MP
- James Wigley, Tory MP
- George Wilbraham, Whig MP
- John Charles Williams Liberal Unionist MP
- Sir Nicholas Winterton Conservative MP
- Henry Christopher Wise Conservative MP
- Sir John Wood, 1st Baronet Conservative MP
- Dennis Kwok Hong Kong Legislative Council Member

== Sport ==
- John Anton, English cricketer
- George Barker, English cricketer
- Robert Barlow (1827–1907), cricketer
- David Barttelot (1821–1852), English cricketer
- Samuel Bateson, Irish cricketer
- Jacob Bethell, English cricketer
- Denis Bingham, Irish cricketer
- Henry Boden, cricketer and founding member of Derbyshire County Cricket Club
- Frederick Bowden-Smith, first-class cricketer
- Trevor Bowring, first-class cricketer
- Edward Bradby, first-class cricketer
- Henry Bradby, first-class cricketer
- Henry Brandt, first-class cricketer
- Chris Brasher, Olympic gold medalist in the steeplechase at the 1956 Summer Olympics, co-founder of the London Marathon and pace setter in Roger Bannister's world record mile
- John Bridger, first-class cricketer
- William Bullock, first-class cricketer
- Walter Byles, first-class cricketer
- Frederick Capron, first-class cricketer
- Henry Cholmondeley, first-class cricketer
- Giles Clarke, the chairman of the England and Wales Cricket Board
- John Clayton (rugby union), international who represented England in the First international rugby match.
- Richard Clement, first-class cricketer
- Louis Cockerell, first-class cricketer
- Granville Coghlan, rugby union international, represented Great Britain on 1927 British Lions tour to Argentina (1907–1983)
- George Cooke (1826–1862), cricketer
- Fulwar Craven, 4th Baron Craven, English nobleman and sportsman
- Frederick Crowder (1845–1938), cricketer and tennis player
- James Crowdy, first-class cricketer
- Joseph Dacre, first-class cricketer
- Peter Dowson, first-class cricketer
- John Marshall Dugdale, rugby union international who represented England in the first international rugby match in 1871.
- Frederick Morton Eden, first-class cricketer
- Edmund Ellis, first-class cricketer
- Francis Evelyn, first-class cricketer
- Nigel Fenton, first-class cricketer
- Patrick Fraser, Scottish first-class cricketer
- Cornelius Fryer, first-class cricketer
- Miles Giffard, English cricketer who was hanged for the murder of his parents.
- Joseph Fletcher Green, rugby union international who represented England in the first international rugby match in 1871.
- James Ford (1836–1877), cricketer
- Alex Grove, rugby player for Worcester Warriors and Scotland national rugby union team
- A. G. Guillemard, rugby union international who represented England in the first international rugby match in 1871 and later president of the Rugby Football Union.
- Thomas Hale (1829–1899), first-class cricketer
- Octavius Hanbury (1826–1882), first-class cricketer
- William Harrison (1838–1912), first-class cricketer
- George Hughes (1821–1872), first-class cricketer and the basis for the literary character Tom Brown
- Alfred Paget Humphry (1850–1916), target rifle shooter and winner of the 1871 Queen's Prize, the premier competition in British fullbore shooting
- Rupert Edward Inglis (1863–1916), England rugby international who was killed at the Battle of the Somme
- Kenneth Jackson, Scottish rugby union international and first-class cricketer
- Edward Kenney, first-class cricketer
- Charles Langton, first-class cricketer
- Alexander Law, first-class cricketer
- Henry Lindow, first-class cricketer
- Algernon Lushington, first-class cricketer
- Arthur Lyon (rugby union), who represented England in the first 1871 Scotland versus England rugby union match.
- Dar Lyon, first class cricketer
- John Macartney-Filgate, Irish first-class cricketer
- Charles McCarthy, cricketer who played in Burma's only first-class cricket match in 1927.
- Douglas Mackessack (1903–1987), Scottish first-class cricketer, brother of the below
- Kenneth Mackessack (1902–1982), Scottish first-class cricketer, brother of the above
- Richard Montgomerie, English cricketer
- David Noble, first-class cricketer
- Rollo O'Dwyer, Argentine first-class cricketer
- Henry Pickard, first-class cricketer
- Abram Rawlinson, first-class cricketer
- Gerard Rotherham, recipient of the Wisden Cricketer of the Year award in 1918.
- Samuel Ruddock, Paralympic sprinter
- Eustace Rutter, first-class cricketer
- John Sandford (1832–1892), first-class cricketer
- Richard Seaman (1913–1939). One of the greatest British pre-war motor racing drivers. Infamously suffered a fatal crash at the 1939 Belgian Grand Prix.
- Alfred Seymour (1843–1897), first-class cricketer
- Ian Shield (1914–2005), first-class cricketer
- Frank Smallwood (1867–1919), first-class cricketer
- Stephen Soames (1826–1908), first-class cricketer
- Francis Speed, first-class cricketer
- Frederick Stokes (1850–1929) the first captain of the England national rugby union team.
- Adrian Stoop, English rugby player
- William Surtees, World Rackets Champion
- Richard Sykes, Rugby player and founder of towns in North Dakota
- Theodore Tapp, first-class cricketer
- Henry Taswell, first-class cricketer
- Henry Tubb, first-class cricketer
- Dawson Turner, rugby union international who represented England in the first international rugby match in 1871.
- Frank Tobin, rugby union international who represented England in the first international rugby match in 1871.
- Richard Townsend (1829–1852), first-class cricketer
- Rowland Venables, first-class cricketer
- Sir Pelham Warner, England cricket captain and cricket administrator
- William Webb Ellis, the credited inventor of rugby football
- John Weston, cricketer
- Tom Wills, the inventor of Australian rules football
- Alfred Wilson (1828–1908), first-class cricketer
- William Yardley, cricketer and dramatist

== Fictional Old Rugbeians ==
- Harry Paget Flashman, fictional Victorian anti-hero, originally created by author Thomas Hughes in his semi-autobiographical Tom Brown's Schooldays
- Tom Brown, fictional hero from the novel Tom Brown's Schooldays

== See also ==
- List of schools in the West Midlands
