= Eustace Rutter =

English cricketer and British Army officer

Personal information
- Full name: Eustace Frederick Rutter
- Born: 20 June 1870; Hillingdon, Middlesex, England
- Died: 13 May 1915 (aged 44); Ypres, West Flanders, Belgium
- Batting: Unknown
- Relatives: Frederick Rutter (father); Edward Rutter (uncle)

Domestic team information
- Years: Team
- 1905/06–1908/09: Europeans

Career statistics
| Competition | First-class |
|---|---|
| Matches | 8 |
| Runs scored | 142 |
| Batting average | 10.92 |
| 100s/50s | –/– |
| Top score | 23 |
| Catches/stumpings | 3/– |
- Source: ESPNcricinfo, 23 November 2022

Eustace Frederick Rutter (20 June 1870 – 13 May 1915) was an English first-class cricketer and British Army officer.

The son of the cricketer Frederick Rutter, he was born at Hillingdon in June 1870. He was educated at Rugby School, where he played for the school cricket team. From Rugby, he matriculated to Trinity Hall, Cambridge. While at Cambridge, he decided upon a career in the British Army and graduated from the Royal Military College, Sandhurst as a second lieutenant into the East Lancashire Regiment in 1892, with promotion to lieutenant following in January 1896. Rutter served in British India in the Mohmand campaign of 1897–1898 and the Tirah campaign, later serving in South Africa during the Second Boer War, where he was present at the Siege of Ladysmith and was decorated with the Queen's South Africa Medal with three clasps.

He gained promotion to captain in September 1901, and while serving back in British India he was seconded for as an adjutant of Indian Volunteers in August 1905. While serving once again in British India, Rutter played first-class cricket for the Europeans cricket team on eight occasions between 1905 and 1908 in the Bombay Presidency Matches. In his eight matches, he scored 142 runs at an average of 10.92, with a highest score of 23. His service in India came to an end in April 1910, at which point he was restored to the East Lancashire Regiment. Rutter served in the First World War with the Regiment on the Western Front, being promoted to major in March 1915, antedated to December 1914. Rutter was killed in action at the Second Battle of Ypres on 13 May 1915, having been shot in the head during a German assault. His uncle, Edward, was also a first-class cricketer.
