= Joseph Dacre =

English cricketer and barrister

Personal information
- Full name: Joseph Dacre
- Born: 6 November 1825; Chittor, Udaipur State, British India
- Died: 8 November 1868 (aged 43); Coton Hill, Staffordshire, England
- Batting: Unknown
- Bowling: Unknown

Domestic team information
- Years: Team
- 1845–1846: Cambridge University

Career statistics
Competition	First-class
Matches	3
Runs scored	46
Batting average	9.20
100s/50s	–/–
Top score	17
Balls bowled	?
Wickets	1
Bowling average	?
5 wickets in innings	–
10 wickets in match	–
Best bowling	1/?
Catches/stumpings	1/–
- Source: ESPNcricinfo, 23 April 2021

Joseph Dacre JP (6 November 1825 – 8 November 1868) was an English first-class cricketer and clergyman.

The son of Joseph Dacre senior, who was a judge in British India, Dacre was born in British India at Chittor. He was educated in England at Rugby School, before going up to Trinity College, Cambridge. While studying at Cambridge, he made three appearances in first-class cricket for Cambridge University Cricket Club. He played once in 1845 against Cambridge Town and County Club and twice in 1846, against the Marylebone Cricket Club at Parker's Piece and Lord's. He scored 46 runs in these matches with a highest score of 17, in addition to taking a single wicket.

A student of Lincoln's Inn, Dacre was called to the bar in 1854. In later life he was a justice of the peace for Cumberland and in 1862 he was the mayor of Carlisle. Dacre died in November 1868 at Coton Hill, Staffordshire, two days after his 43rd birthday.
