= Edward Rutter =

English cricketer

Personal information
- Born: 3 August 1842; Hillingdon, Middlesex, England
- Died: 4 February 1926 (aged 83); Halliford, Middlesex, England
- Batting: Right-handed
- Bowling: Slow left-arm orthodox
- Relatives: Frederick Rutter (brother)

Domestic team information
- Years: Team
- 1862–1876: Middlesex

Career statistics
Competition	First-class
Matches	45
Runs scored	733
Batting average	11.27
100s/50s	0/3
Top score	64
Balls bowled	7,073
Wickets	183
Bowling average	17.81
5 wickets in innings	15
10 wickets in match	5
Best bowling	7/47
Catches/stumpings	29/0
- Source: Cricinfo, 25 May 2023

Edward Rutter (3 August 1842 – 4 February 1926) was an English cricketer who played 45 matches of first-class cricket between 1862 and 1876 for Middlesex and Marylebone Cricket Club (MCC).

Rutter was educated at Rugby School. He was a member of the committee that drafted the rules for Rugby union.

Although he was a free-hitting right-handed batsman, Rutter was more prominent as a slow left-handed round-arm bowler. Playing for Middlesex against Kent at Gravesend in 1868 he had a match analysis of 11 for 123. When Surrey beat Middlesex by three wickets in 1870, he took every Surrey wicket that fell in the second innings, finishing with 7 for 47.

He wrote a memoir, Cricket Memories, which was published in 1925, the year before he died.
