= Richard Townsend =

Richard Townsend may refer to:

- Richard Townsend (soldier) (c. 1618–1692), English soldier, Irish MP for Baltimore
- Richard Townsend (mathematician) (1821–1884), Irish mathematician, author, and academic
- Richard Townsend (sportsman) (1886–1960), Australian rules footballer and cricketer
- Richard Townsend (politician) (c. 1731–1783), Irish MP for Cork County and Dingle 1776
- Richard Boyle Townsend (1756–1826), Irish MP for Dingle 1782–1795
- Richard Townsend (sailor) (born 1929), Canadian sailor
- Richard Townsend (cricketer) (1829–1852), English cricketer

== See also ==
- Richard W. Townshend (1840–1889), U.S. Representative from Illinois
