= Coton Hill =

Coton Hill may refer to several places:

- Coton Hill, Shropshire, a suburb of Shrewsbury, England
- Coton Hill, Staffordshire, a hamlet in Staffordshire, England
