= Alfred Swann (priest) =

Rev. Canon Alfred Swann, MA, DSC (12 July 1893 – 7 October 1961) was Dean and Archdeacon of Hong Kong from 1927 to 1935.

== Biography ==
He was born in Japan to British parents. He was educated at Rugby and Trinity Hall, Cambridge. After wartime service in the RNVR he was ordained in 1922. Following a curacy in Kirkburton he was Vicar of Liversedge before his time in Hong Kong; and held incumbencies in Wiltshire and Somerset afterwards. He left extensive notes on his wartime experiences, now held by the Imperial War Museum.
