= Thomas Hale (cricketer) =

English first-class cricketer

Personal information
- Full name: Thomas Wyatt Hale
- Born: 21 April 1829; East Grinstead, Sussex, England
- Died: 17 May 1899 (aged 70); Uxbridge, Middlesex, England
- Batting: Unknown
- Relatives: John Hale (brother)

Domestic team information
- Years: Team
- 1851–1852: Oxford University

Career statistics
Competition	First-class
Matches	6
Runs scored	86
Batting average	9.55
100s/50s	–/–
Top score	27
Catches/stumpings	2/–
- Source: Cricinfo, 3 August 2019

Thomas Wyatt Hale (21 April 1829 – 17 May 1899) was an English first-class cricketer.

Who is the son of John Hale, he was born in East Grinstead in April 1829. He was educated at Rugby School, matriculating at St John's College, Oxford in 1848, and graduating B.A. in 1852. While studying at Oxford, he made his debut in first-class cricket for Oxford University against the Marylebone Cricket Club at Oxford in 1851. He played first-class cricket for Oxford until 1852, making four further appearances. His final first-class appearance came for the Gentlemen of England against a United England Eleven at Hove in 1853. In his six first-class matches, Hale scored 86 runs with a high score of 27. After graduating from Oxford, Hale enlisted in the Oxfordshire Militia as a lieutenant in April 1854. He died at Uxbridge in May 1899. His brother, John, also played first-class cricket.
