= Rowland Venables =

English cricketer

Personal information
- Full name: Rowland George Venables
- Born: 18 January 1846; Truro, Cornwall, England
- Died: 9 March 1920 (aged 74); Oswestry, Shropshire, England
- Batting: Right-handed
- Bowling: Left-arm roundarm medium

Domestic team information
- Years: Team
- 1866–1869: Oxford University

Career statistics
| Competition | First-class |
|---|---|
| Matches | 2 |
| Runs scored | 26 |
| Batting average | 13.00 |
| 100s/50s | –/– |
| Top score | 24* |
| Balls bowled | 144 |
| Wickets | 4 |
| Bowling average | 23.00 |
| 5 wickets in innings | – |
| 10 wickets in match | – |
| Best bowling | 3/25 |
| Catches/stumpings | –/– |
- Source: Cricinfo, 18 February 2020

Rowland George Venables JP (18 January 1846 – 9 March 1920) was an English first-class cricketer and barrister.

The son of The Reverend Joseph Venables, he was born at Truro in January 1846. He was educated at Rugby School, before going up to University College, Oxford.

While studying at Oxford, he made two appearances in first-class cricket for Oxford University, against the Marylebone Cricket Club in 1866 and the Gentlemen of England in 1869. He scored 26 runs in his two matches, in addition to taking 4 wickets with his left-arm roundarm medium pace bowling, with best figures of 3 for 25.

A student of the Inner Temple, Venables was called to the bar in 1872. He was a member of the Oxford circuit and the chairman of the Ludlow Board of Guardians. He was also a justice of the peace for Shropshire and the Welsh county of Denbighshire.

He remained active in cricket following his time at Oxford and was a prominent figure in Shropshire cricket, appearing for the county between 1866 and 1876 while playing at club level for Oswestry, in addition to being a member of the Free Foresters Cricket Club. Venables died suddenly at Oswestry in March 1920.
