= Rugby Theatre =

Amateur theatre in Warwickshire, England

Coordinates: 52.374129°N 1.260282°W

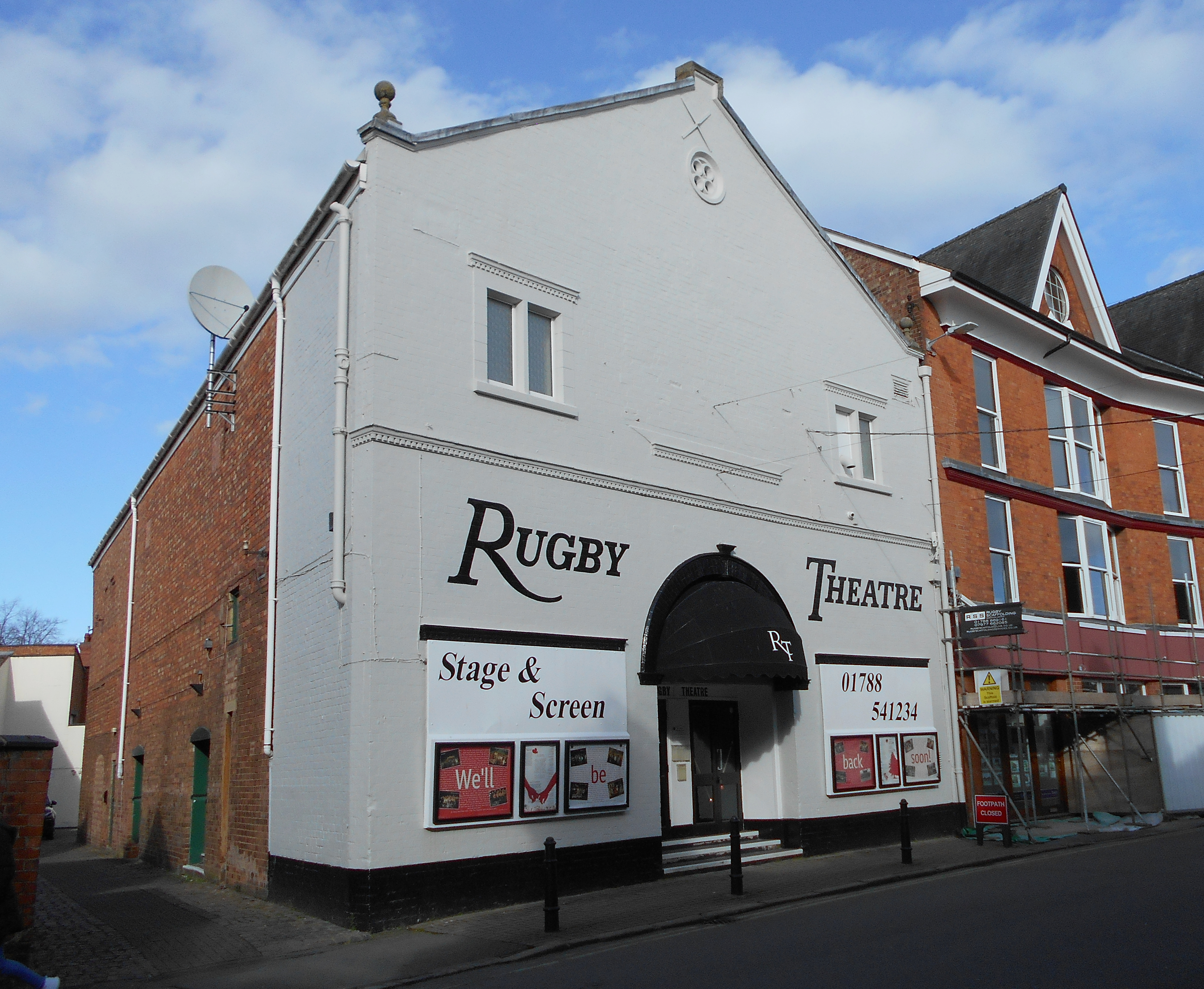
- Interactive map of Rugby Theatre

Website
- www.rugbytheatre.co.uk

Rugby Theatre is an amateur theatre in Rugby, Warwickshire, located in Henry Street in the town centre.

The building which the theatre is based in on Henry Street was first opened as a 550 seat cinema called The Empire in 1913, being renamed as The Scala in 1923. In 1946 the cinema was taken over by the rival Granada company and closed.

In 1946 the Rugby Amateur Theatre Society was formed with the intention of founding a permanent theatre in the town, in 1947 they obtained the former cinema and set about converting it into a theatre, re-opening it as such in 1949. Among the founders of the theatre was Harry Pigott-Smith, father of famous actor Tim Pigott-Smith. Today the theatre society has over 500 members.

The main theatre has 270 seats, and puts on up to twelve live shows a year, ranging from classical drama to musicals, as well as hosting musical entertainments, and showing up to 20 films a year in the small cinema.

The theatre is a member of the Little Theatre Guild of Great Britain, as well as being affiliated to the National Operatic and Dramatic Association and the Association of British Theatre Technicians.

== See also ==
- Macready Theatre
