= John Hale (cricketer) =

English cricketer

John Hinde Hale (16 September 1830 – 11 July 1878) was an English cricketer active from 1853 to 1865 who played for Sussex and was club captain in 1863. He was born in East Grinstead and died in Notting Hill. He appeared in 49 first-class matches as a righthanded batsman who sometimes kept wicket. He scored 1,242 runs with a highest score of 61 and completed 37 catches with one stumping. His brother, Thomas, also played first-class cricket.
