= Cornelius Fryer =

English cricketer and barrister

Personal information
- Full name: Cornelius Willoughby Hudleston Fryer
- Born: 12 February 1834; Rugby, Warwickshire, England
- Died: 27 April 1874 (aged 40); Andoversford, Gloucestershire, England
- Batting: Unknown

Domestic team information
- Years: Team
- 1854–1856: Cambridge University

Career statistics
Competition	First-class
Matches	4
Runs scored	21
Batting average	3.50
100s/50s	–/–
Top score	10
Balls bowled	12
Wickets	6
Bowling average	?
5 wickets in innings	–
10 wickets in match	–
Best bowling	3/?
Catches/stumpings	–/–
- Source: Cricinfo, 25 April 2021

Cornelius Willoughby Hudleston Fryer (12 February 1834 – 27 April 1874) was an English first-class cricketer and barrister.

The son of Lieutenant-Colonel George Fryer, he was born at Rugby in February 1834, and where he was educated at Rugby School. From Rugby he went up to Trinity College, Cambridge. While studying at Cambridge, he played first-class cricket for Cambridge University Cricket Club from 1854 to 1856, making four appearances. He scored 21 runs in his four matches, in addition to taking 6 wickets from 12 balls bowled, a wicket every 2 balls. Having appeared in The University Match against Oxford University at Lord's in 1854, Fryer gained a cricket blue.

After graduating from Cambridge he became a barrister as a member of the Inner Temple, being called to the bar in 1866. He lived at Bath and died in April 1874 at Andoversford, Gloucestershire.
