= John Weston (cricketer) =

English cricketer and clergyman

Personal information
- Full name: John Stiles Weston
- Born: 18 November 1831; St John's Wood, Middlesex, England
- Died: 26 December 1858 (aged 27); Monmouth, Monmouthshire, Wales
- Batting: Unknown
- Bowling: Unknown

Domestic team information
- Years: Team
- 1851–1854: Cambridge University

Career statistics
Competition	First-class
Matches	9
Runs scored	25
Batting average	2.27
100s/50s	0/0
Top score	10
Balls bowled	?
Wickets	18
Bowling average	?
5 wickets in innings	2
10 wickets in match	1
Best bowling	7/?
Catches/stumpings	4/–
- Source: Cricinfo, 5 August 2019

John Stiles Weston (18 November 1831 – 26 November 1858) was an English first-class cricketer and Anglican clergyman.

Weston was born at St John's Wood in November 1858 to Ambrose Weston. He was educated at Rugby School, before going up to Emmanuel College, Cambridge. While studying at Cambridge, he made his debut in first-class cricket for Cambridge University against the Marylebone Cricket Club at Lord's in 1851. He played first-class cricket for Cambridge until 1854, making seven further appearances. He took 18 wickets for Cambridge across his eight first-class appearances, with two five-wicket hauls. Weston gained a cricket blue in 1851 and 1852. In addition to playing for Cambridge, he also made a single first-class appearance for the Gentlemen of England against the Gentlemen of Marylebone Cricket Club at Lord's in 1854. After graduating from Cambridge, he became an Anglican clergyman. He was a deacon at Gloucester in 1856, before becoming the curate of Monmouth later that year. He died at Monmouth in November 1858.
