= Macready Theatre =

Building in Rugby, Warwickshire, England

Coordinates: 52.370709°N 1.262106°W

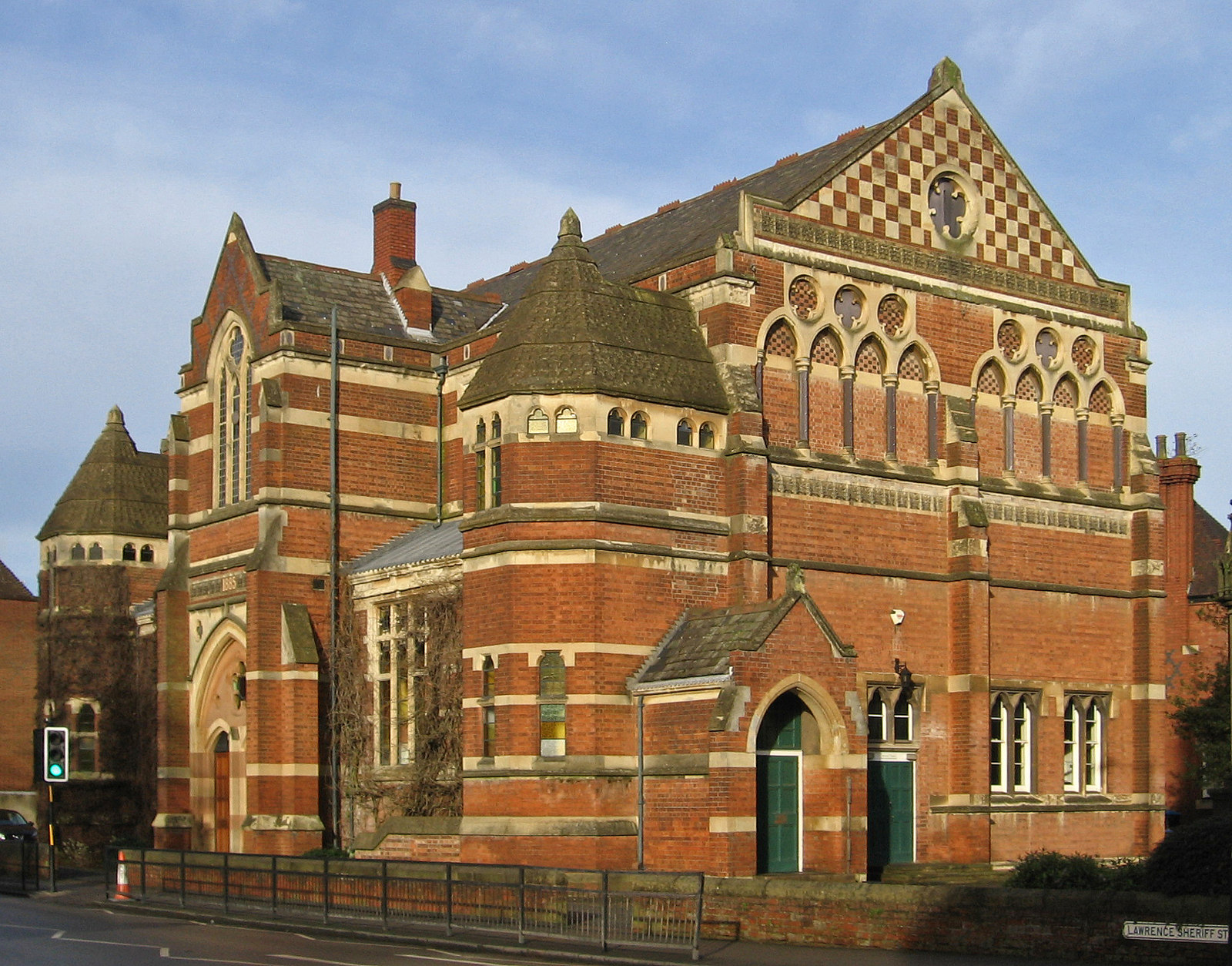
Macready Theatre

The Macready Theatre is a professional theatre on Lawrence Sheriff Street in the town centre of Rugby, Warwickshire, it is owned by Rugby School.

The theatre is housed in an old Victorian building which dates from 1885 which was originally built as classrooms for Rugby School. In 1975 it was converted into a theatre, named after the actor and former Rugby School pupil William Charles Macready (1793–1873). The theatre was however not opened up to the public until December 2018. The theatre intends to give away one third of its tickets to local school groups for free, in response to cuts made to arts teaching in state schools.

The theatre has 250 seats, and was fitted with a lift for people with disabilities, and is complete with a bar and foyer. According to Rugby School, the theatre will undergo renovations over the next year, to be completed by approximately February. This will increase disabled access and allow for improved seating and a larger staging area.

== See also ==
- Rugby Theatre
