= Richard Townsend (cricketer) =

English cricketer

Personal information
- Full name: Richard Bowdler Townsend
- Born: 26 March 1829; Chelsea, Middlesex, England
- Died: 10 February 1852 (aged 22); Norwood, Surrey, England
- Batting: Unknown

Domestic team information
- Years: Team
- 1850: Oxford University

Career statistics
Competition	First-class
Matches	1
Runs scored	6
Batting average	6.00
100s/50s	–/–
Top score	6
Catches/stumpings	–/–
- Source: Cricinfo, 5 April 2020

Richard Bowdler Townsend (26 March 1829 – 10 February 1852) was an English first-class cricketer.

The son of Richard Edward Austin Townsend, he was born at Chelsea in March 1829. He was educated at Rugby School, before going up to University College, Oxford. While studying at Oxford, he made a single appearance in first-class cricket for Oxford University against the Marylebone Cricket Club at Oxford in 1850. Batting once in the match, he was dismissed for 6 runs by William Lillywhite in the Oxford first-innings. He died before completing his studies at Oxford, dying in February 1852 at Norwood, Surrey.
