= Frederick Rutter =

English cricketer

Frederick John Rutter (12 September 1839 – 19 January 1907) was an English cricketer active in 1868 who played for Lancashire. He was born in Hillingdon, Middlesex and died in Abbey Wood, Kent. He appeared in two first-class matches, scoring 15 runs with a highest score of 8*.
