= Coton Hill, Staffordshire =

Hamlet in Staffordshire, England

Coordinates: 52.88815°N 2.02374°W

Coton Hill is a hamlet in the English county of Staffordshire.

Coton Hill is located east of the village of Milwich on the B5027 road between Stone and Uttoxeter. The smaller hamlet of Coton Hayes lies to its east.
