= Rugby School =

Co-educational private school in Warwickshire, England

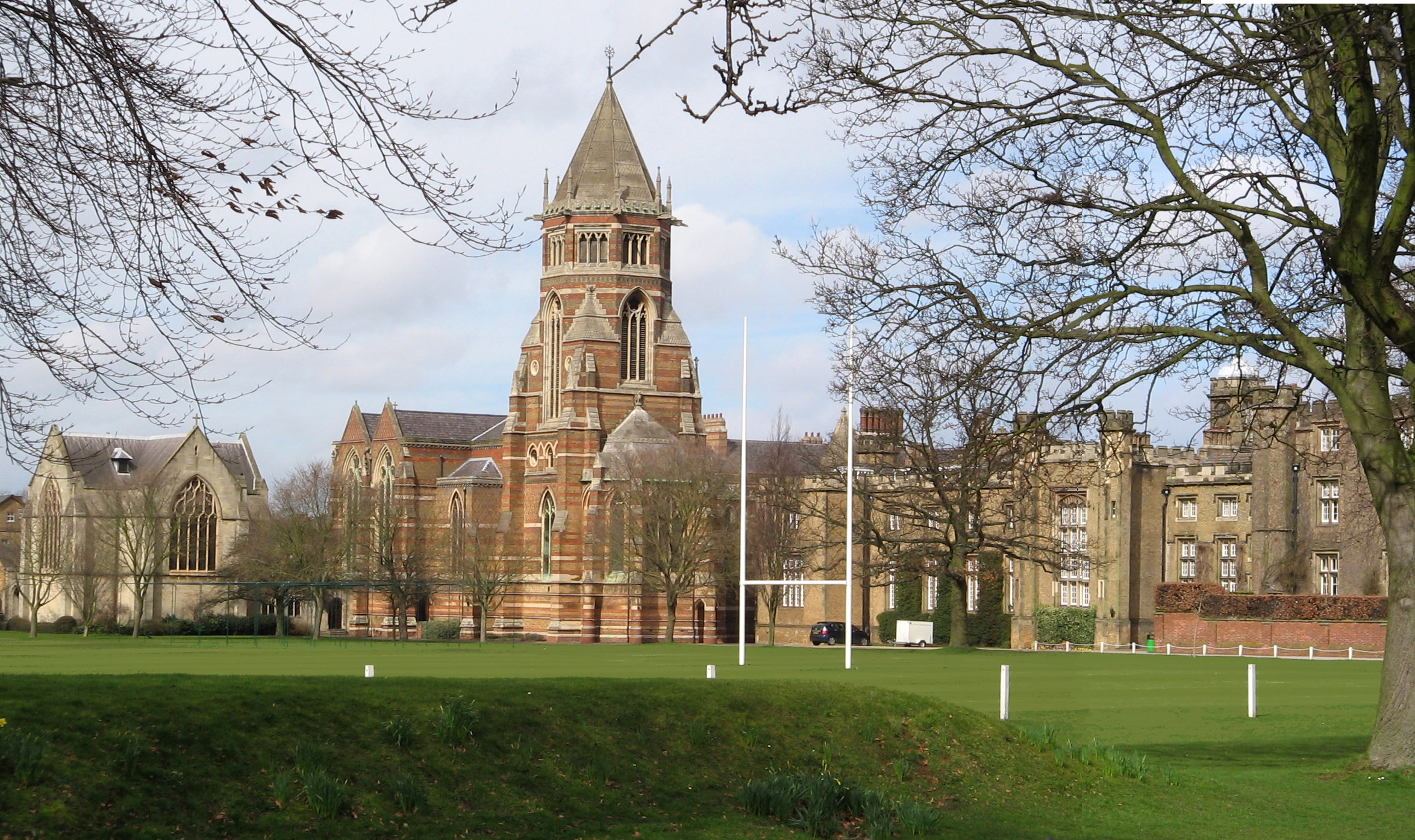
- Rugby School, seen from 'The Close' playing field in 2006.

Location
- Lawrence Sheriff Street; Rugby, Warwickshire, CV22 5EH; England; 52.3675°N 1.2611°W

Information
- Type: Public School; Private school
- Motto: Latin: Orando Laborando (through work and through prayer)
- Religious affiliation: Church of England
- Established: 1567; 459 years ago
- Founder: Lawrence Sheriff
- Sister school: Rugby School Thailand; Rugby School Japan; Rugby School Nigeria; Rugby School Dubai; Rugby School Hanoi; Bilton Grange; Aysgarth School; Old Buckenham Hall School; Beaudesert Park School
- Department for Education URN: 125777 Tables
- Head: Gareth Parker-Jones
- Gender: Co-educational
- Age: 13 to 18
- Enrolment: 865
- Capacity: 885
- Student to teacher ratio: 7:1
- Campus size: 400-acre (160 ha)
- Campus type: Semi-rural
- Houses: 15
- Colours: Duck Egg Blue, Oxford Blue, Cambridge Blue
- Budget: £59,377,000 (2024)
- Revenue: £54,595,000 (2024)
- Affiliations: HMC; The Rugby Group
- Alumni: Old Rugbeians (ORs)
- School song: Floreat Rugbeia
- Publications: The Meteor (Official school-run magazine, since 1867); The Quod (Pupil-run magazine)
- Website: www.rugbyschool.co.uk

Listed Building – Grade I
- Official name: Chapel at Rugby School
- Designated: 11 October 1949
- Reference no.: 1183714

Listed Building – Grade II*
- Official name: New Quad Buildings at Rugby School
- Designated: 11 October 1949
- Reference no.: 1035020

Listed Building – Grade II*
- Official name: Old Quad Buildings at Rugby School
- Designated: 11 October 1949
- Reference no.: 1035021

Listed Building – Grade II*
- Official name: School House at Rugby School
- Designated: 11 October 1949
- Reference no.: 1183930

Listed Building – Grade II*
- Official name: War Memorial Chapel at Rugby School
- Designated: 11 October 1949
- Reference no.: 1365005

Listed Building – Grade II
- Official name: New Big School at Rugby School
- Designated: 3 September 1976
- Reference no.: 1183946

Rugby School is a public school (English private boarding school) for pupils aged 13–18, located in the town of Rugby, Warwickshire in England.

Founded in 1567 as a free grammar school for local boys, it is one of the oldest independent schools in Britain. Up to 1667, the school remained in comparative obscurity. Its re-establishment by Thomas Arnold during his time as Headmaster, from 1828 to 1842, was seen as the forerunner of the Victorian public school. It was one of nine schools investigated by the Clarendon Commission of 1864 and later regulated as one of the seven schools included in the Public Schools Act 1868. Originally a boys' school, it became fully co-educational in 1992.

The school's alumni – or "Old Rugbeians" – include a UK prime minister, a French prime minister, several bishops, poets, scientists, writers and soldiers.

Rugby School is the birthplace of rugby football.

== History ==
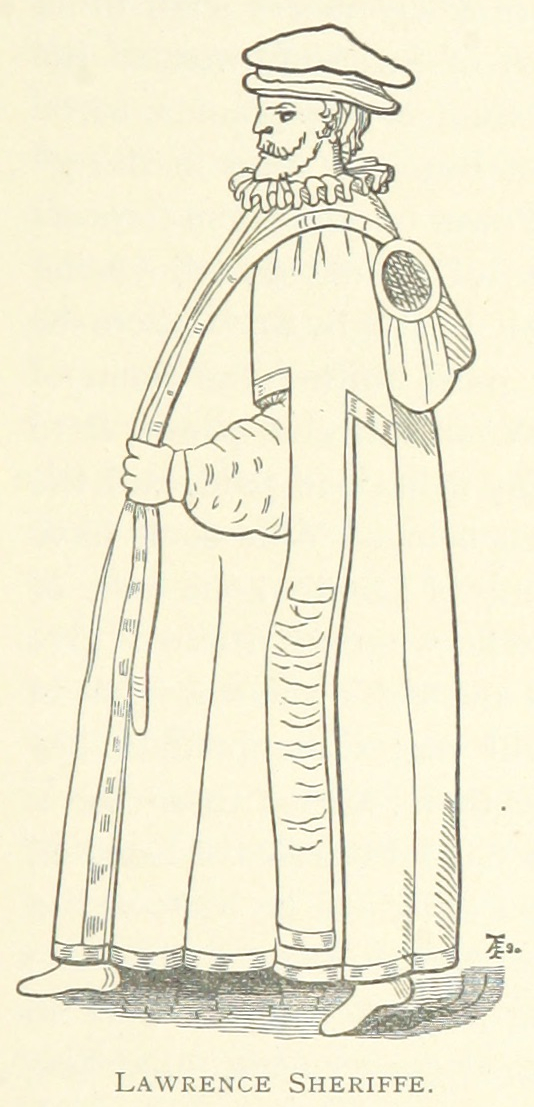
Lawrence Sheriff, founder of Rugby School

=== Foundation and early growth ===
Rugby School was founded in 1567 as a provision in the will of Lawrence Sheriff, who had made his fortune supplying groceries to Queen Elizabeth I. In the last few months of his life, Sheriff had drawn up a will which stipulated that his fortune should be used to found almshouses and a free grammar school "to serve chiefly for the children of Rugby and Brownsover... and next for such as be of other places hereunto adjoyneing.". Shortly before his death, Sheriff added a codicil to his will reducing the amount of money he left to the school, possibly due to a family financial problem, but instead leaving his eight acre Conduit Close estate in Middlesex: At the time this seemed like a poor exchange, as the estate consisted of undeveloped farmland on the edge of London, however, in time this endowment made Rugby School a wealthy institution due to the subsequent development of the area and rise in land values. The area of what is now the Rugby Estate includes much of what is now Great Ormond Street, Lamb's Conduit Street and Rugby Street in the London district of Bloomsbury.

Up to 1667, the school remained in comparative obscurity. Sheriff's endowment was not fully realized for some time, due to a challenge over the provisions of the will from the Howkins family, to whom Sheriff was related through his sister, Bridget. Its history during that trying period is characterised mainly by a series of lawsuits between the Howkins family, who tried to defeat the intentions of the testator, and the masters and trustees, who tried to carry them out. A final decision was handed down in 1667, confirming the findings of a commission in favour of the trust, and henceforth the school maintained a steady growth. Under the headmastership of Henry Holyoake (from 1688 to 1731) the school became more than simply a local concern, and began to take on national importance. By the end of the 17th century, there were pupils from every part of England attending the school.

The school was originally based in a wooden schoolhouse on Church Street opposite St Andrew's Church, which incorporated Lawrence Sheriff's former house. By the 1740s this building was in poor condition, and the school looked to relocate to new premises. In 1750, the school moved to its current location to the south of the town centre, when it purchased a former Manor House at the south of High Street; this became the Master's house, a new schoolhouse was built alongside. The current school buildings date from the 19th and early 20th centuries.

Henry Ingles, who was Headmaster between 1794 and 1806, was known for his strict discipline and gained the nickname "The Black Tiger". His time as Headmaster is most notable for the 'Great Rebellion' of 1797: It started when Ingles heard one of the boys shoot a cork gun, and the boy told him that Mr Rowell, a grocer, had supplied the gunpowder. Mr Rowell denied this, and as a result the boy Astley was flogged by Ingles, the boys retaliated by smashing Mr Rowell's windows and Ingles insisted that the boys pay for the damage. This provoked a full-scale riot, in which the boys blew off doors, smashed windows and burned furniture and books. As the other Masters were away, Ingles called on help from the townsfolk. A party of recruiting soldiers and some townsfolk advanced on the rioters, who retreated onto a moated island in the school grounds. The Riot Act was read out by a local justice of the peace, calling on the boys to surrender, and while this caused a distraction a group of soldiers waded across the moat from the rear and took the boys prisoner.

=== Victorian period ===
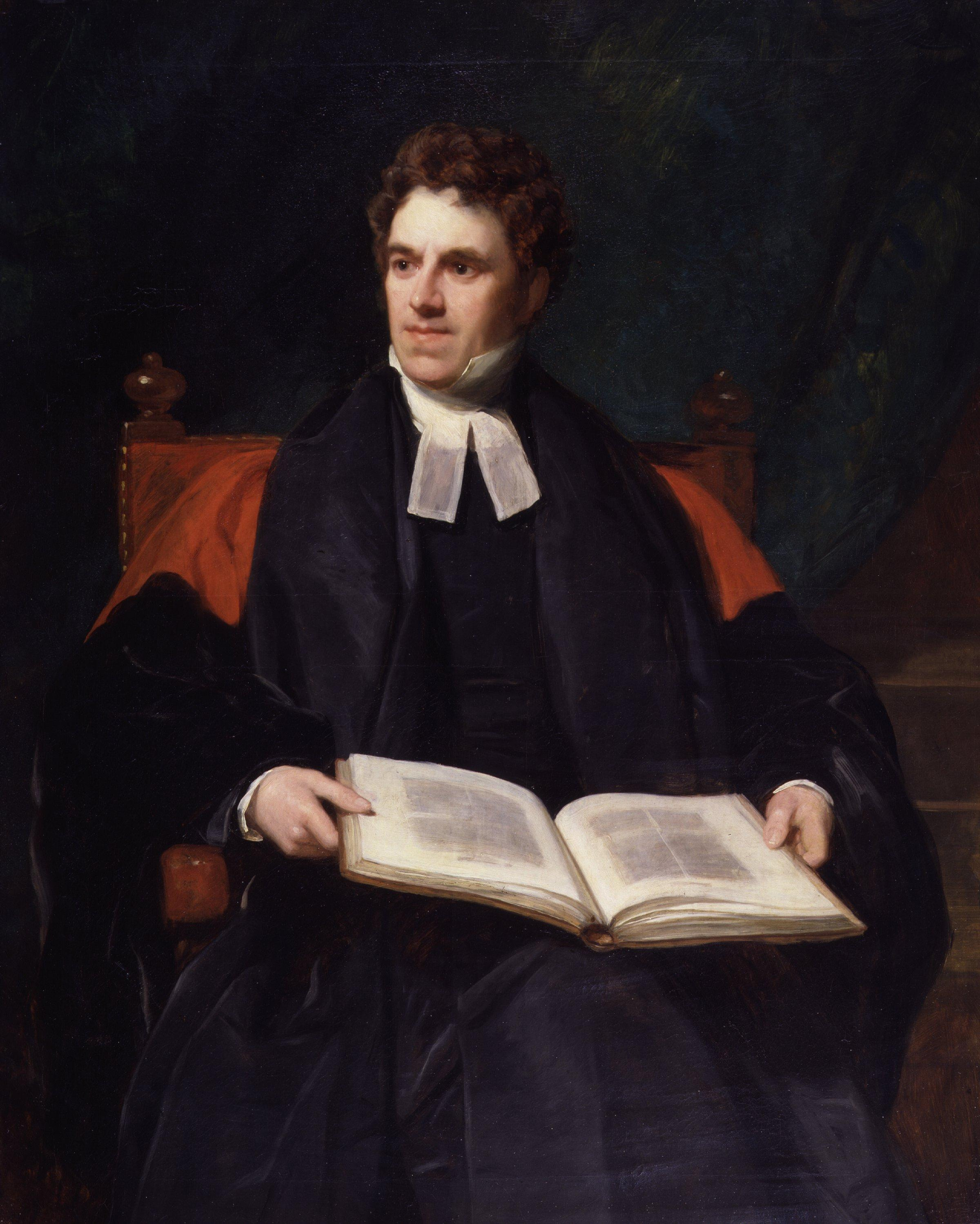
Thomas Arnold, Headmaster from 1828 to 1841

Rugby School's most famous headmaster was Thomas Arnold, from 1828 to 1842, whose emphasis on moral and religious principle, was widely admired and was seen as the blueprint for Victorian public schools. Arnold's period as headmaster is immortalised in Thomas Hughes' 1857 novel Tom Brown's School Days. In the Victorian period, Rugby School saw several further Headmasters of some distinction, these included Frederick Temple (1858–1869) who would later become the Archbishop of Canterbury, John Percival (1887–1895) after whom the Percival Guildhouse is named, and Herbert Armitage James (1895–1910)

In 1845, a committee of Rugby schoolboys, William Delafield Arnold, W. W. Shirley and Frederick Hutchins, wrote the "Laws of Football as Played At Rugby School", the first published set of laws for any code of football.

Rugby was one of the nine prestigious schools investigated by the Clarendon Commission of 1861–64 (the schools under scrutiny being Eton, Charterhouse, Harrow, Shrewsbury, Westminster, and Winchester, and two day schools: St Paul's and Merchant Taylors). Rugby went on to be included in the Public Schools Act 1868, which ultimately related only to the seven boarding schools.

From the early days of the school the pupils were divided into "Foundationers" i.e. boys who lived in Rugby and surrounding villages who received free schooling, as per Sheriff's original bequest, and "Non-Foundationers", boys from outside the Rugby area who paid fees and were boarders. Non-Foundationers were admitted from the early history of the school as they helped to pay the bills. Gradually, as the school's reputation grew, fee-paying Non-Foundationers became dominant and local boys benefited less and less from Sheriff's original intentions. By the latter half of the 19th century it was considered no longer desirable to have local boys attending a prestigious public school and so a new school – Lawrence Sheriff Grammar School – was founded in 1878 in order to continue Sheriff's original bequest for a free school for local boys.

On several occasions in the late 19th century Rugby School was visited by the French educator Pierre de Coubertin, who would later cite the school as one of the main inspirations for his most notable achievement, the founding of the modern Olympic Games in 1896.

=== Co-education ===
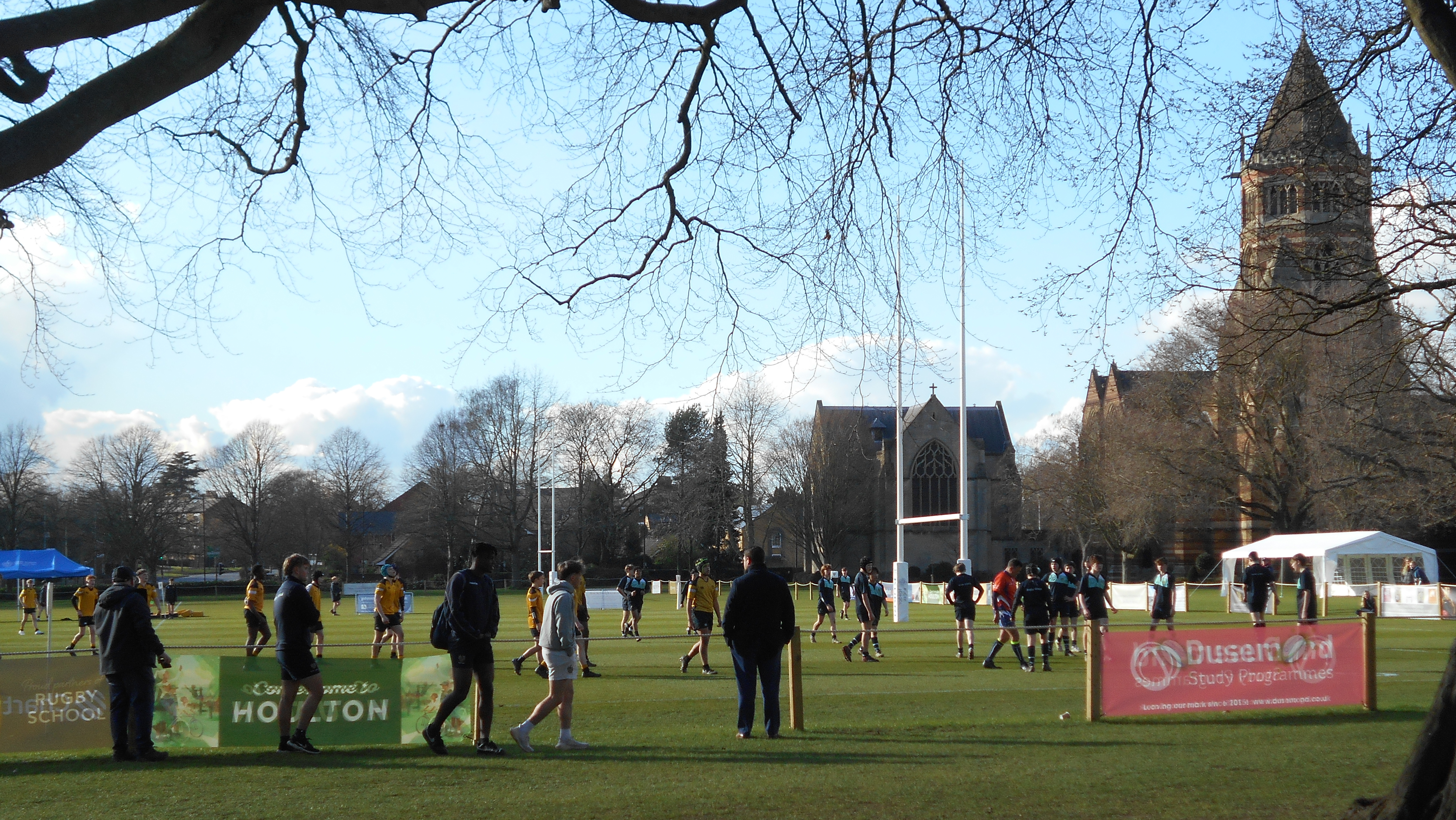
Game of Rugby being played on 'the Close' at Rugby School, where the sport was invented.

In 1975 three girls were admitted to the Upper School with another ten joining in 1976. The first girls' house opened in 1976, another opened in 1979 and two more in the 1980s. By 1989 there were 100 girls studying at Rugby School. In 1993 the school became fully co-educational when the first cohort of 13-year-old girls arrived. In the 1990s three boys' houses were converted into girls' houses with one becoming a dedicated sixth form house. In 1995 Rugby appointed its first Head Girl, Louise Woolcock, who appeared on the front page of The Times. By 1998 girls were part of all year groups and the last girls' house opened in 2003.

Today there are over 800 students at Rugby School, which has 15 houses (13 boarding, 2 day).

=== The Rugby School Group ===
In 2017, Rugby School expanded internationally with the opening of Rugby School Thailand, its first overseas school as part of Rugby School Global. The Rugby School Group was subsequently formed in 2019 following the addition of Bilton Grange. Led by Rugby School, the Group is an educational family of independent schools across the UK and internationally.

UK Prep Schools:

- Bilton Grange (joined 2019)
- Aysgarth School (joined 2025)
- Old Buckenham Hall (joined 2026)
- Beaudesert Park School (joined 2026)

International Schools:

- Rugby School Thailand (opened 2017)
- Rugby School Japan (opened 2023)
- Rugby School Nigeria (opened 2025)
- Rugby School Dubai (opened 2026)
- Rugby School Hanoi (opened 2026)

== Rugby football ==
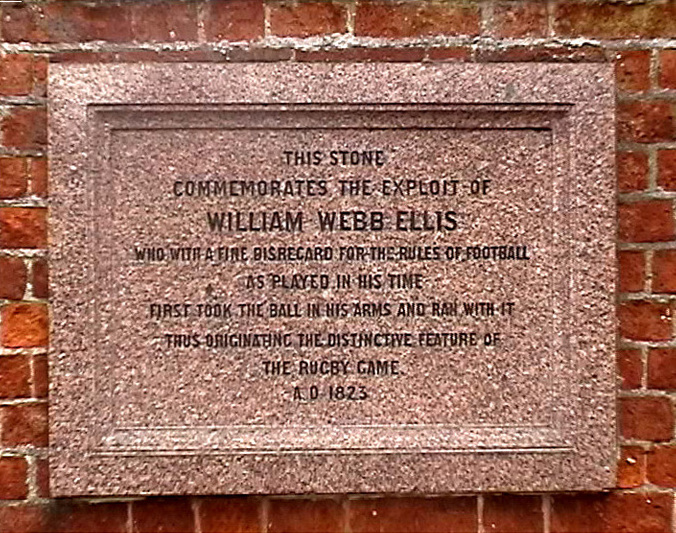
William Webb Ellis plaque

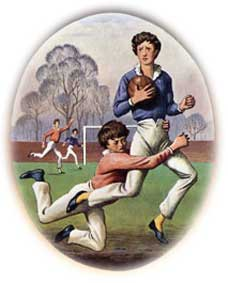
Webb Ellis at Rugby, 1823

The game of Rugby football owes its name to the School, first popularised globally following the 1857 novel Tom Brown's School Days which included a long section describing a football match at the School.

Playing football at the School began in the late 1700s. The legend of William Webb Ellis and the 1823 origin of the game is commemorated by a plaque on the school grounds. The story is that Webb Ellis was the first to take possession of the football and run with it, and thus invent the distinctive ball-handling football code. However, the sole source of the story is Matthew Bloxam, a former pupil but not a contemporary of Webb Ellis. In October 1876, four years after the death of Webb Ellis, in a letter to the school newspaper The Meteor he quotes an unknown friend relating the story to him. He elaborated on the story four years later in another letter to The Meteor, but shed no further light on its source. Credit for innovations in the 19th century game are also given to students James 'Jem' Mackie and Charles Stuart Dakyns.

There were no written rules for football at Rugby School in Webb Ellis's time (1816–1825) and most varieties involved carrying the ball. The games played at Rugby were organised by the pupils and not the masters, the rules being a matter of custom and not written down. They were frequently changed and modified with each new intake of students.The account given in Tom Brown's School Days was of a match played in the late 1830s era.

Richard Lindon, a boot and shoemaker who had premises across the street from the school's main entrance in Lawrence Sheriff Street, is credited with the invention of the "oval" rugby ball, the rubber inflatable bladder and the brass hand pump.

The School's football laws were first put in writing in 1845. The game was then taken up by other schools and the first rugby football clubs emerged in the 1860s. This lineage from football at Rugby School continued into the 1870s with the founding rules of rugby union, American football, Canadian football and later rugby league. Rugby School 'old boy' Tom Wills had earlier co-founded Australian rules football in Melbourne in 1859.

From 1870 until 1876, the School's jerseys for matches against external opponents featured red, white, and blue stripes, after which they were changed to white jerseys with the School crest.

== Rugby fives ==
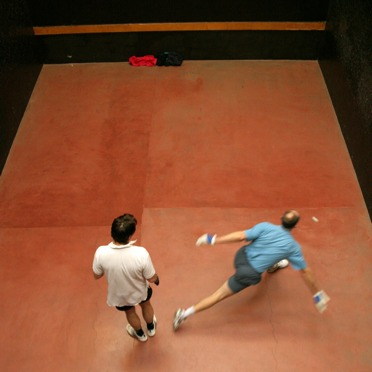
Rugby fives

Rugby fives is a handball game, similar to squash, played in an enclosed court. It has similarities with Winchester fives (a form of Wessex fives) and Eton fives.

It is most commonly believed to be derived from Wessex fives, a game played by Thomas Arnold, Headmaster of Rugby, who had played Wessex fives when a boy at Lord Weymouth's Grammar, now Warminster School. The open court of Wessex fives, built in 1787, is still in existence at Warminster School although it has fallen out of regular use.

Rugby fives is played between two players (singles) or between two teams of two players each (doubles), the aim being to hit the ball above a 'bar' across the front wall in such a way that the opposition cannot return it before a second bounce. The ball is slightly larger than a golf ball, leather-coated and hard. Players wear leather padded gloves on both hands, with which they hit the ball.

Rugby fives continues to have a good following with tournaments being run nationwide, presided over by the Rugby Fives Association.

== Cricket ==
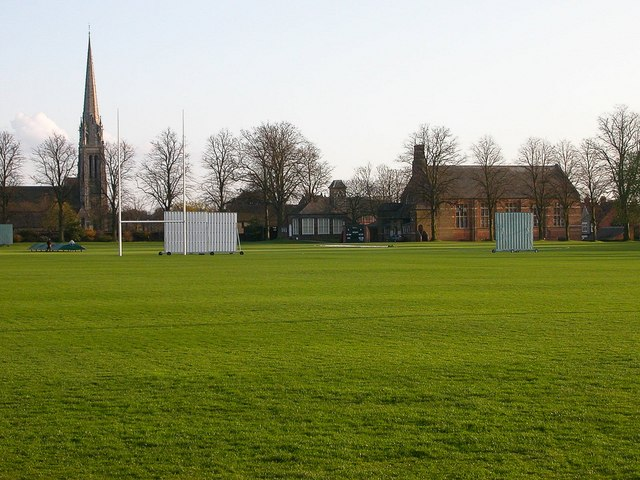
A view of the cricket ground at Rugby School

The school has produced a number of cricketers who have gone onto play Test and first-class cricket. The school has played host to two major matches, the first of which was a Twenty20 match between Warwickshire and Glamorgan in the 2013 Friends Life t20. The second match was a List-A one-day match between Warwickshire and Sussex in the 2015 Royal London One-Day Cup, though it was due to host a match in the 2014 competition, however this was abandoned. In the 2015 match, William Porterfield scored a century, with a score of exactly 100. Warwickshire will return to Rugby School in 2024 to play three matches in the One-Day Cup.

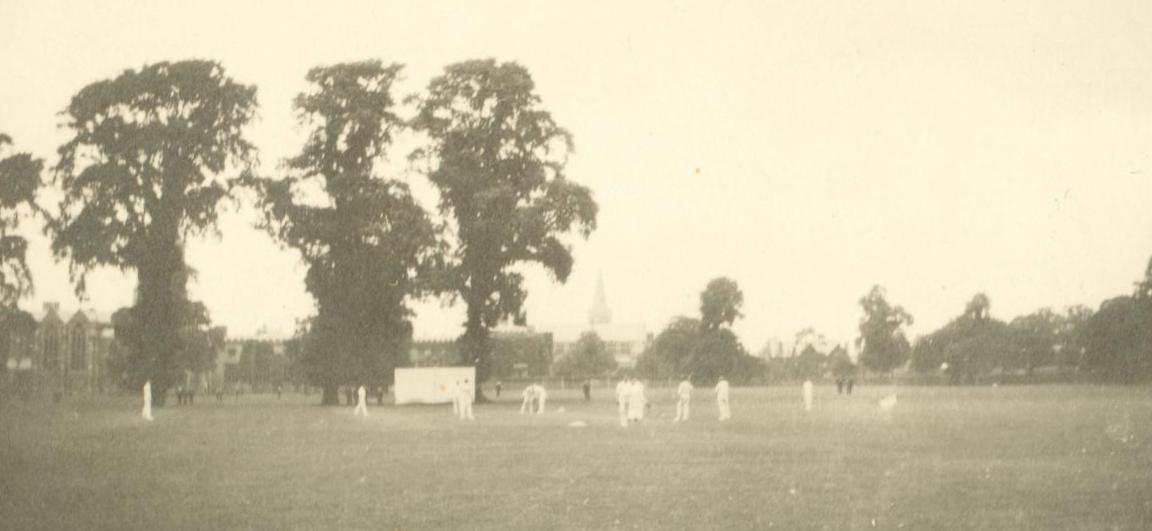
Cricket Match between University of Pennsylvania and Rugby School (c. 1907)

== Houses ==
Rugby School has both day and boarding-pupils, the latter in the majority. Originally it was for boys only, but girls have been admitted to the sixth form since 1975. It went fully co-educational in 1992. The school community is divided into houses.

House	Founded ^{†}	Girls/Boys
Cotton	1836	Boys
Kilbracken	1841 [1848 and 1941]	Boys
Michell	1841 [1883]	Boys
School Field	1831 [1852]	Boys
School House	1750	Boys
Sheriff	1930	Boys
Town House	1567	Boys (Day)
Whitelaw	1803	Boys
Bradley	1830 (1992)	Girls
Dean	1978	Girls
Griffin	2003	Girls
Rupert Brooke	1988	Girls
Southfield	1984	Girls (Day)
Stanley	1828 (1992)	Girls
Tudor	1893 (2002)	Girls

- ^{†} Numbers in () brackets indicate date of conversion to a Girls' house where applicable. Numbers in [] indicate date the house moved to a new site

== Academic life ==
Pupils beginning Rugby in the F Block (first year) study various subjects. In a pupil's second year (E block), they do nine subjects which are for their GCSEs, this is the same for the D Block (GCSE year). The school then provides standard A-levels in 29 subjects. Students at this stage have the choice of taking three or four subjects and are also offered the opportunity to take an extended project. The School also offers taking the IB Diploma Programme. Oxbridge acceptance percentage in 2007 was 10.4%. In 2023, 68% of students that took A-levels at Rugby School scored A*/A while 83% of GCSE students scored 9/7.

=== Scholarships ===
The Governing Body provides financial benefits with school fees to families unable to afford them. Parents of pupils who are given a Scholarship are capable of obtaining a 10% fee deduction, although more than one scholarship can be awarded to one student.

== Fees ==
- Boarder fees per term: £19,640
- Day pupil fees per term: £12,450

== Notable alumni ==
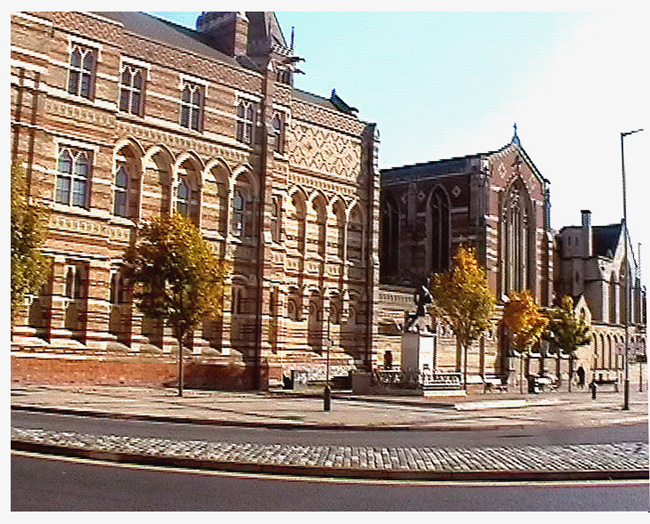
Rugby School from the side

There have been a number of notable Old Rugbeians, including the purported father of the sport of Rugby William Webb Ellis, the inventor of Australian rules football, Tom Wills, the war poets Rupert Brooke and John Gillespie Magee, Jr., Prime Minister Neville Chamberlain, author and mathematician Lewis Carroll, Prime Minister of France William Waddington, poet and cultural critic Matthew Arnold, the author and social critic Salman Rushdie (who said of his time there: "Almost the only thing I am proud of about going to Rugby school was that Lewis Carroll went there too.") and the Irish writer and republican Francis Stuart. The Indian concert pianist, music composer and singer Adnan Sami also studied at Rugby School. Matthew Arnold's father Thomas Arnold, was a headmaster (1828–1842) and significant reformer the school and English education in general. Philip Henry Bahr (later Sir Philip Henry Manson-Bahr), a zoologist and medical doctor, World War I veteran, was President of both Royal Society of Tropical Medicine and Hygiene and Medical Society of London, and vice-president of the British Ornithologists' Union. Richard Barrett Talbot Kelly joined the army in 1915, straight after leaving the school, earned a Military Cross during the First World War, and later returned to the school as Director of Art. The diplomat Sir Frank Kenyon Roberts was a pupil at Rugby in the 1920s. The English evolutionary biologist V. C. Wynne-Edwards, famous for his ecological work on seabirds and origination of the evolutionary theory of group selection, enrolled at Rugby in 1920.

=== Rugbeian Society ===
The Rugbeian Society is for former pupils at the school. An Old Rugbeian is sometimes referred to as an OR.

The purposes of the society are to encourage and help Rugbeians in interacting with each other and to strengthen the ties between ORs and the school.

In 2010, the Rugbeians reached the semi-finals of the Public Schools' Old Boys' Sevens tournament, hosted by the Old Silhillians to celebrate the 450th anniversary of fellow Warwickshire public school, Solihull School.

== Buildings and architecture ==
The buildings of Rugby School date from the 18th and 19th century with some early 20th-century additions. The oldest buildings are the Old Quad Buildings and the School House the oldest parts of which date from 1748, but were mostly built between 1809 and 1813, designed by Henry Hakewill, these are grade II* listed.

Most of the current landmark buildings date from the Victorian era and were designed by William Butterfield: The most notable of these is the chapel, dating from 1872, which is topped by an octagonal tower 138 feet (42 m) tall, and is grade I listed. Butterfield's New Quad buildings are Grade II* listed and date from 1867 to 1885. The Grade II* War Memorial chapel, designed by Sir Charles Nicholson, dates to 1922. Nicholson was educated at the school from the late-1870s.

The Temple Speech Room on Barby Road was named after former Rugby headmaster, Frederick Temple, It was opened on 3 July 1909 by King Edward VII. Designed by Thomas Graham Jackson, it is grade II listed. The Macready Theatre is based in a prominent Victorian building on Lawrence Sheriff Street which was built as classrooms in 1885, in 1975 it was converted into a theatre, in 2018, it was opened to the general public.

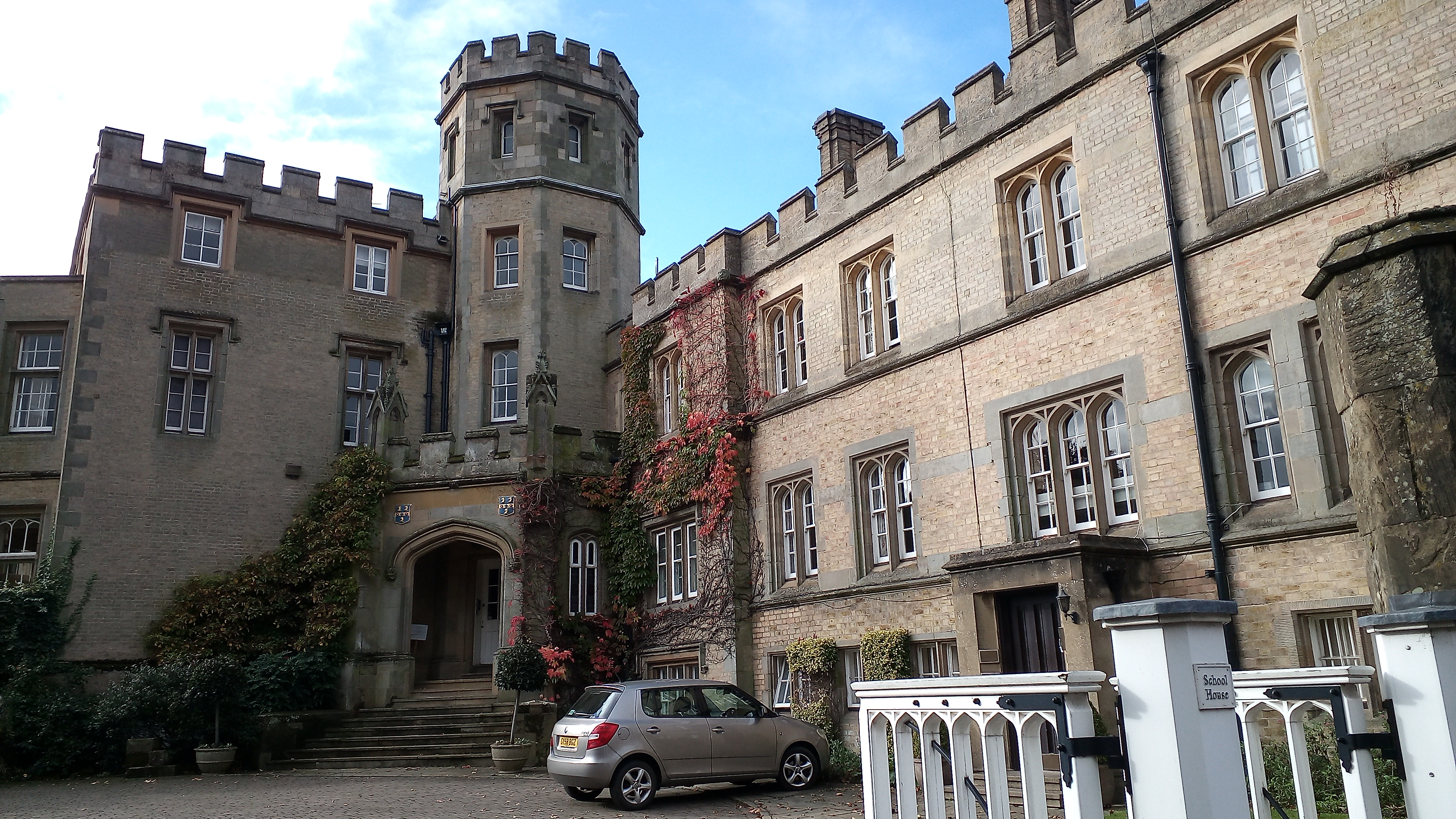
The School House, of 1813

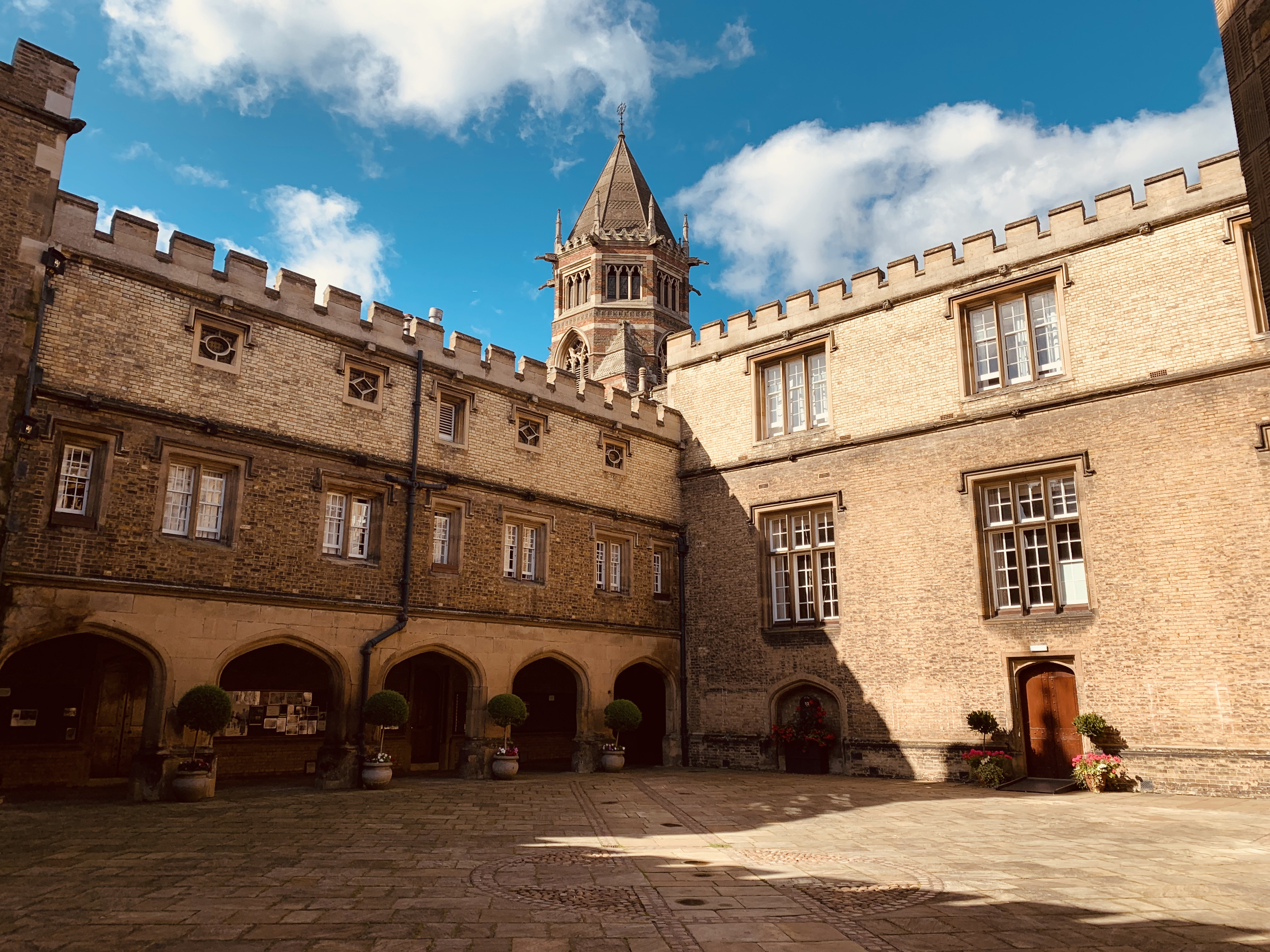
Old Quad Buildings of 1809-13

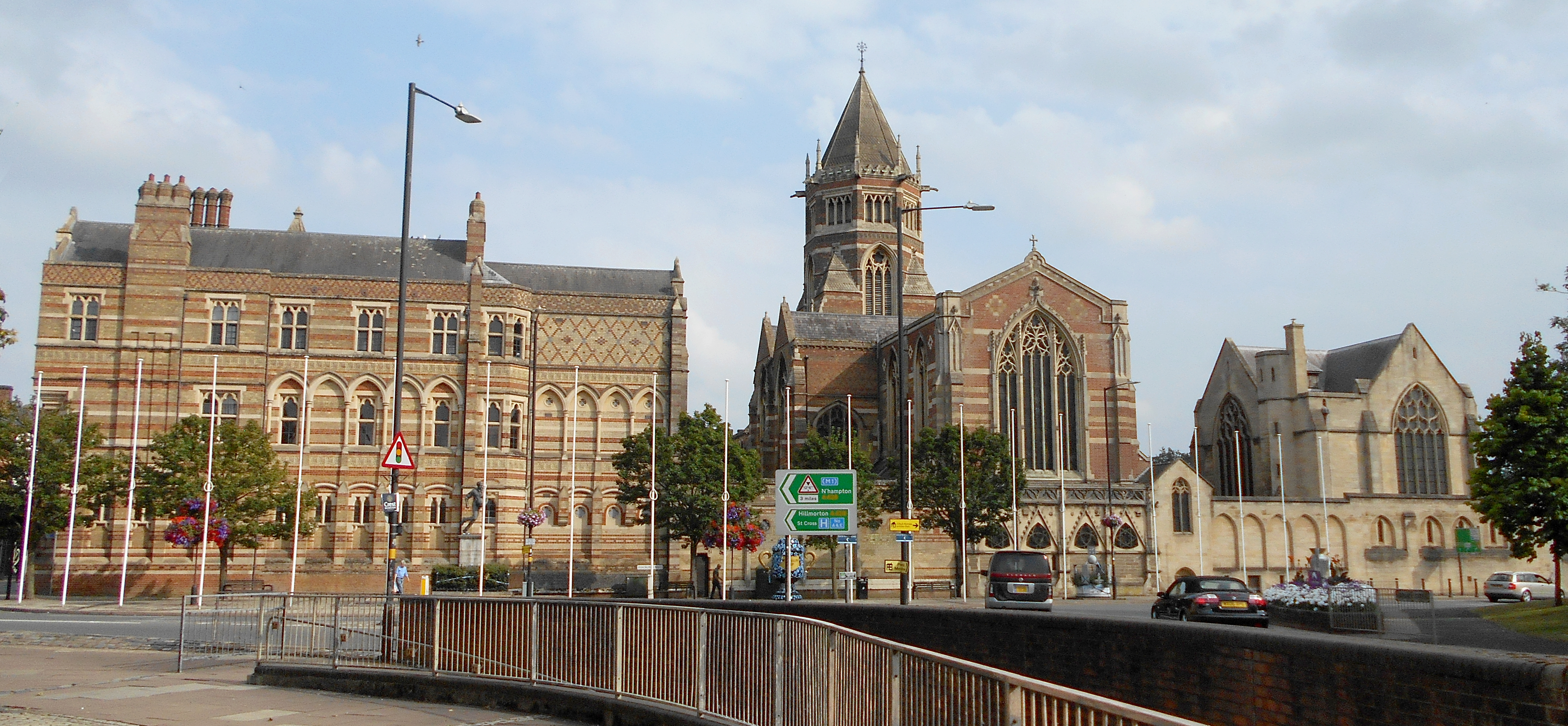
From left to right; New Quad Buildings, Chapel and War Memorial Chapel.

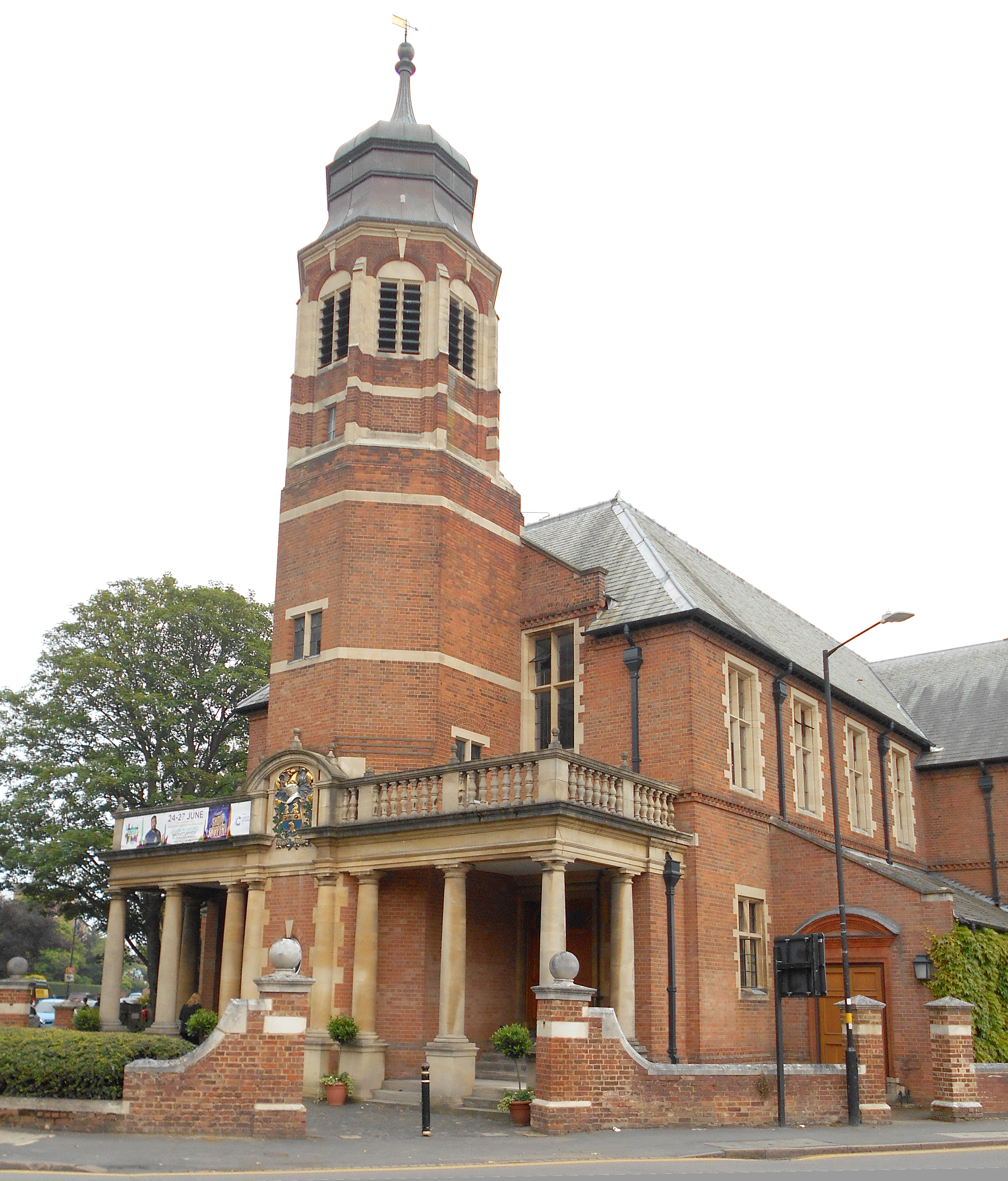
Temple Speech Room

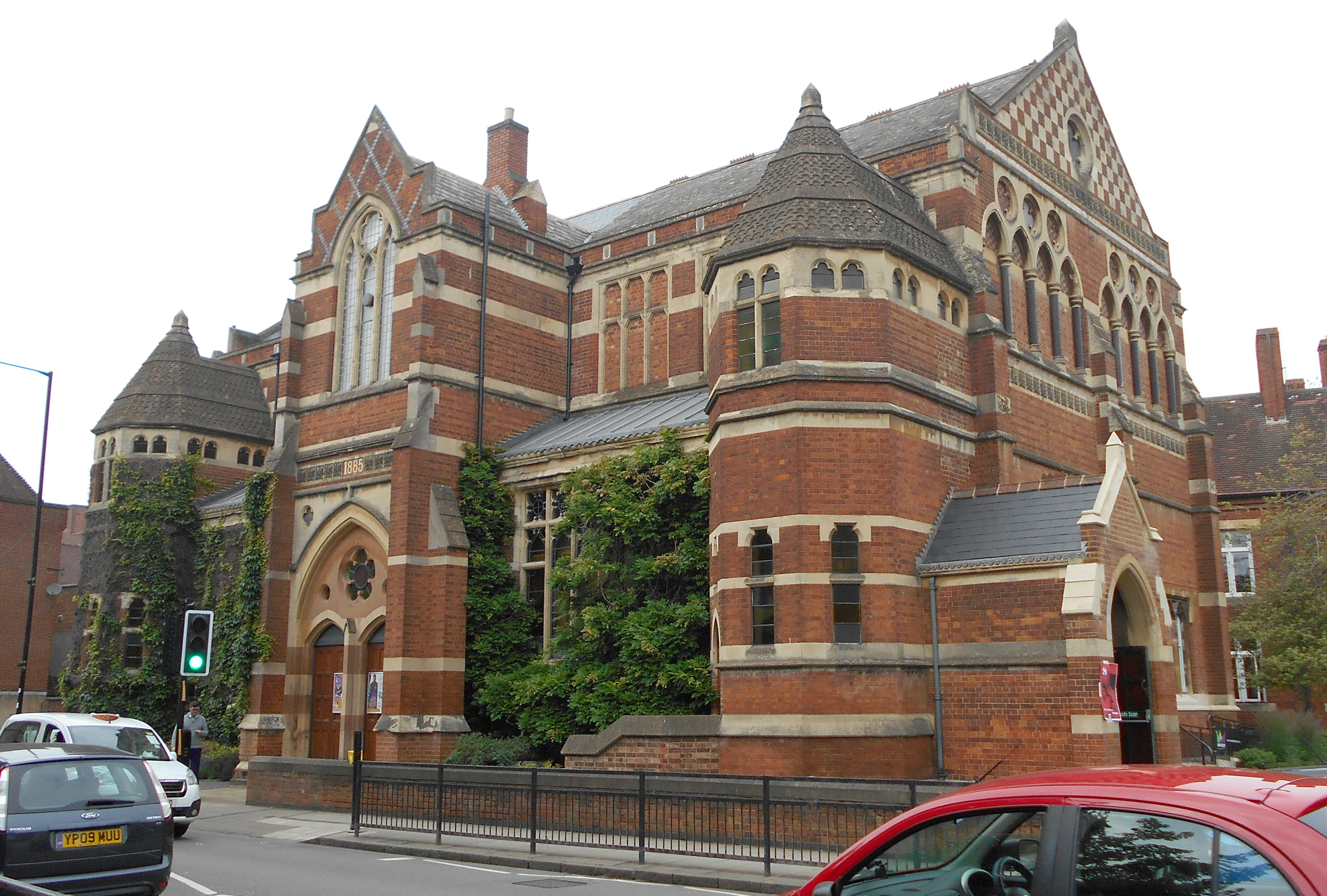
Macready Theatre

== Head Masters ==
- Edward Rolston - 1574
- Richard Seale - 1579
- Nicolas Greenhill – 1581
- Augustus Rolfe – 1604
- Wiligent Greene – 1626
- Edward Clerke - 1640
- Raphael Pearce – 1641
- Peter Whitehead - 1651
- John Allen – 1660
- Knightley Harrison – 1670
- Robert Ashbridge – 1675
- Leonard Jeacocks – 1681
- Henry Holyoake – 1687
- John Plomer – 1730
- Thomas Crossfield – 1742
- William Knail – 1744
- John Richmond – 1751
- Stanley Burrough – 1755
- Thomas James – 1778
- Henry Ingles – 1794
- John Wooll – 1806
- Thomas Arnold – 1828
- Archibald Campbell Tait – 1842
- Meyrick Goulburn – 1850
- Frederick Temple – 1858
- Henry Hayman – 1870
- Thomas William Jex-Blake – 1874
- John Percival – 1887
- Herbert Armitage James – 1895
- Albert Augustus David – 1910
- William Wyamar Vaughan – 1921
- Percy Hugh Beverley Lyon – 1931
- Arthur Frederic Brownlow fforde – 1948
- Walter Hamilton – 1957
- James Woodhouse – 1967
- Brian Rees −1980
- Richard Bull – 1985
- Michael Mavor – 1990
- Patrick Derham – 2001
- Peter Green - 2014
- Peter Green (Executive Head Master) - 2020-2024
- Gareth Parker Jones (Head) - 2020

=== Thomas Arnold ===
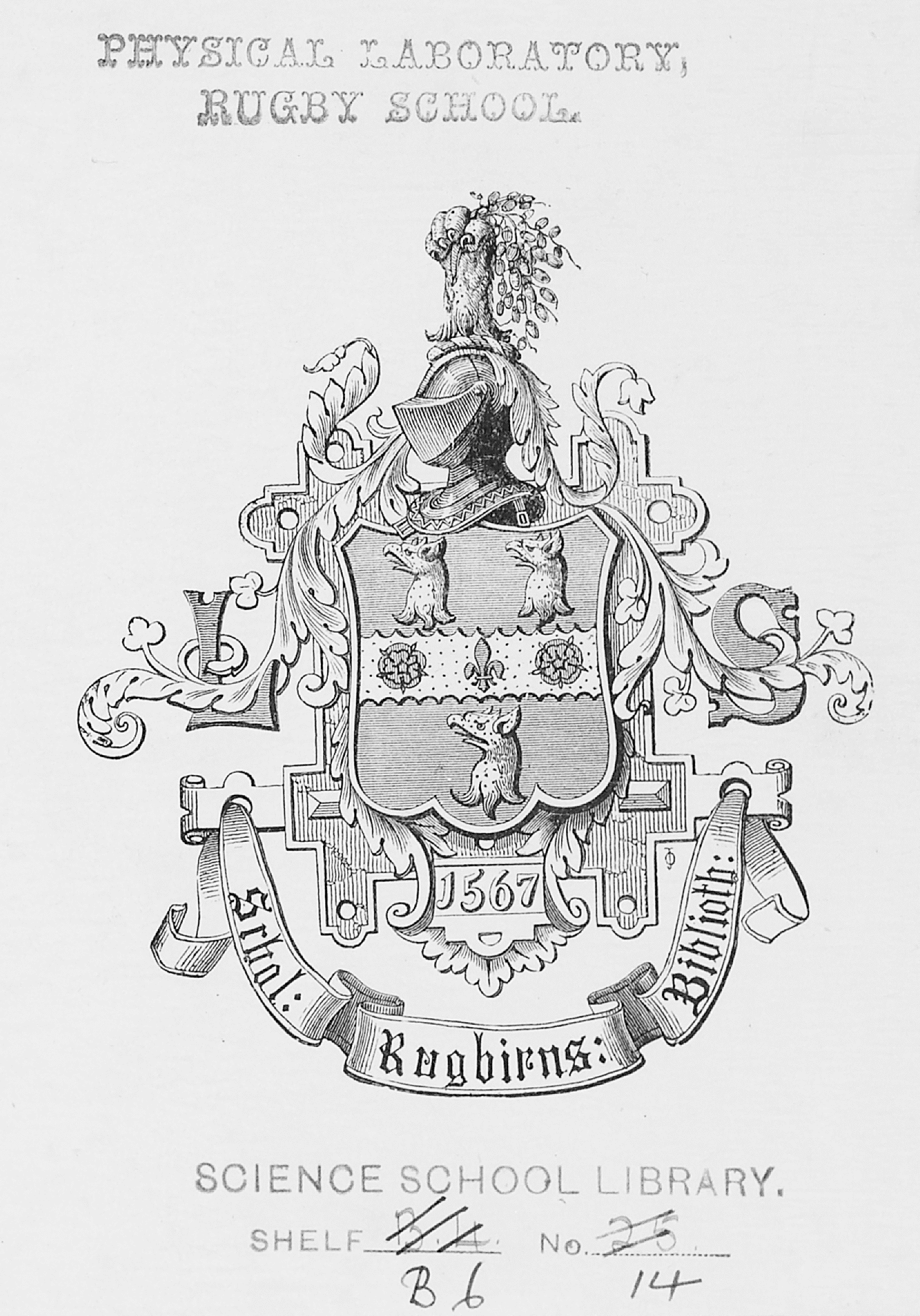
Ex libris from Rugby School. From BEIC

Rugby's most famous headmaster was Thomas Arnold, appointed in 1828; he executed many reforms to the school curriculum and administration. Arnold's and the school's reputations were immortalised through Thomas Hughes' book Tom Brown's School Days.

David Newsome writes about the new educational methods employed by Arnold in his book, 'Godliness and Good Learning' (Cassell 1961). He calls the morality practised at Arnold's school muscular Christianity. Arnold had three principles: religious and moral principle, gentlemanly conduct and academic performance. George Mosse, former professor of history at the University of Wisconsin-Madison, lectured on Arnold's time at Rugby. According to Mosse, Thomas Arnold created an institution which fused religious and moral principles, gentlemanly conduct, and learning based on self-discipline. These morals were socially enforced through the "Gospel of work". The object of education was to produce "the Christian gentleman", a man with good outward appearance, playful but earnest, industrious, manly, honest, virginal pure, innocent, and responsible.

=== John Percival ===
In 1888 the appointment of Marie Bethell Beauclerc by Percival was the first appointment of a female teacher in an English boys' public school and the first time shorthand had been taught in any such school. The shorthand course was popular with one hundred boys in the classes.

== Controversy ==
In September 2005, the school was one of fifty independent schools operating independent school fee-fixing, in breach of the Competition Act, 1998. All of the schools involved were ordered to abandon this practice, pay a nominal penalty of £10,000 each and to make ex-gratia payments totalling three million pounds into a trust designed to benefit pupils who attended the schools during the period in respect of which fee information had been shared.

The head of the Independent Schools Council declared that independent schools had always been exempt from anti-cartel rules applied to business, were following a long-established procedure in sharing the information with each other and that they were unaware of the change to the law (on which they had not been consulted). She wrote to John Vickers, the OFT director-general, stating "They are not a group of businessmen meeting behind closed doors to fix the price of their products to the disadvantage of the consumer. They are schools that have quite openly continued to follow a long-established practice because they were unaware that the law had changed."

== See also ==
- List of schools in the West Midlands
- Four Rugby Boys
