= History of Trinity College, Oxford =

The history of Trinity College, Oxford documents the 450 years from the foundation of Trinity – a collegiate member of the University of Oxford – on 8 March 1554/5. The fourteenth-oldest surviving college, it reused and embellished the site of the former Durham College, Oxford. Opening its doors on 30 May 1555, its founder Sir Thomas Pope created it as a Catholic college teaching only theology. It has been co-educational since 1979.

== Origins ==
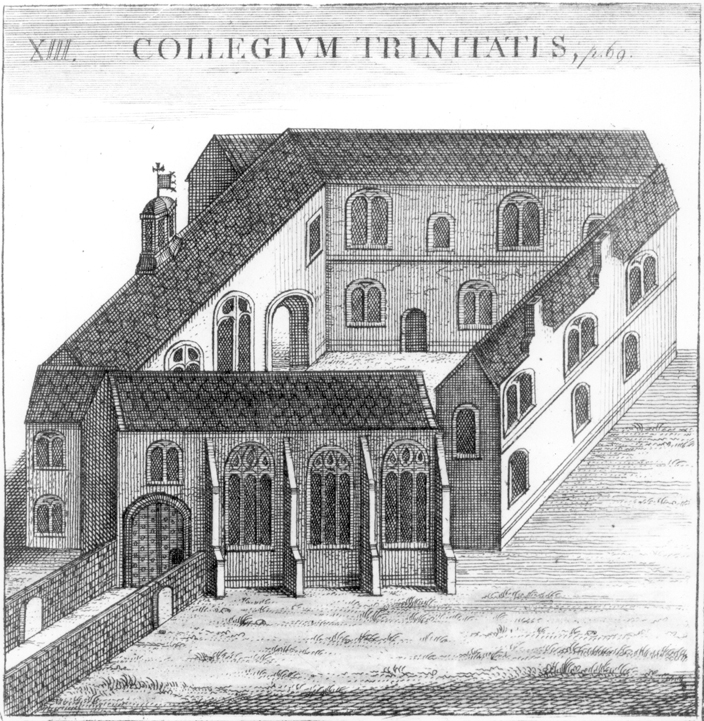
Trinity College in 1566 (looking north), shortly after its foundation

In 1553, King Edward VI awarded the buildings and much of the grounds of the former Durham College, Oxford (established in the second half of the thirteenth century and seized by the crown in 1545), to Dr George Owen of Godstow and William Martyn of Oxford. Two years later, on 20 February 1555 (20 February 1554 in contemporary notation), Owen and Martyn sold the property on to self-made politician Sir Thomas Pope. As an executor of Thomas Audley, Pope had been deeply involved with the foundation of Magdalene College, Cambridge and the plot, situated on Broad Street, Oxford, included a recently constructed library, refectory and sleeping quarters. The political climate was also favourable: the new Queen Mary I was taking a great interest in reviving Oxford as a place of Catholic study. As well as gaining influence with Mary, Pope (who was rich but childless) may also have seen the potential for ensuring that his family name lived on. On 8 March 1555, sixteen days after acquiring the Broad Street site, Pope was given permission to found a college in royal letters patent.

The new statutes drawn up named the new (Catholic) establishment as "The College of the Holy and Undivided Trinity in the University of Oxford, of the Foundation of Thomas Pope", a name which persists. Durham College had been dedicated to the Virgin Mary, St Cuthbert, and the Trinity, and it is thought that Trinity College took its name from the last element of this dedication. The original statutes of the college provided for a President, twelve fellows, eight scholars and twenty commoners, making it one of Oxford's smallest colleges even at the time of its inception. The fellows were to study theology, a point insisted upon by Pope, who selected Thomas Slythurst, fellow of Magdalen, to be Trinity's first President. All the relevant property was transferred to the new college during Pope's only visit on 28 March 1555. Tuition for undergraduates included that in classical texts, philosophy (including arithmetic, geometry and arithmetic) and astronomy. Despite a delay whilst fellows were found, on 25 March 1556 revenues from the estates began to be transferred to the college. The statutes officially came into force on 1 May, and 29 days later Trinity College Oxford opened its doors to its first students.

== Early history (1555–1600) ==
Trinity's early problems centred on its finances, especially after Pope decided to establish places for four additional scholars. Aware of these problems, Pope both made out a loan to the college and gradually extended its endowment, such that by 1557 Trinity was in control of five manors: Wroxton-with-Balscote, Sewell, Dunthorp, Holcombe and Great Waltham. In total, these generated a rent of approximately £200, which was augmented by £65 from other smaller land holdings. In 1558 Pope swapped in extra lands at Great Waltham and took back Sewell and Dunthorp with no overall impact on Trinity's finances. He also sent large consignments of furnishings for the chapel (many of them ex-monastical), as well as sixty-three books for the library and various utensils for the refectory. After various teething problems, the statutes were amended and finalised in the same year.

On 29 January 1559, Thomas Pope died, leaving the new college without a protector at court. His will – the execution of which was undertaken by his wife Elizabeth – did, however, include several references to Trinity, including the provision of funds for a fence to demarcate Trinity's land from that of next-door St. John's and for a residence outside the city to act as a safe-house during the frequent times of plague. Any remarriage on Elizabeth's part was to be accompanied by a large gift of furnishings to the college, a clause which was belatedly adhered to in 1564. Contrary to his will, however, Pope's body (original interred in St. Stephen's, Walbrook) was moved to the college chapel around the same time.

Trinity's Catholicism made for a difficult relationship with the Crown following Pope's death. The new Protestant Queen Elizabeth I, who succeeded to the throne in 1558, had the Catholic Slythurst removed from his post almost immediately. Fortunately for Trinity, his replacement (former fellow Arthur Yeldard), while hardly an avid Protestant, proved sufficiently pragmatic to retain his post for the next forty years. Over that time Trinity reluctantly moved with the times, and, threatened by the Crown, melted down its church plate and purchased new English-language psalm books. Fellows who disagreed with the changes left the college; this they did in significant numbers. In 1583, Trinity's first antagonism with neighbour (and modern rivals) Balliol was recorded, when the latter accused Trinity of being untrue to the Protestant faith.

The number of commoners (as opposed to religious scholars) attending grew steadily throughout the latter half of the sixteenth century, with the limit of twenty that had been imposed by the statutes quickly being exceeded. The group was divided according to circumstance, with servitors (who worked in college in part payment for their education) at the bottom, battelers in the middle and a further sub-divided hierarchy of fellow (or "gentleman") commoners at the top, though those from better backgrounds tended to have less need for official degrees and rarely bothered to officially matriculate. During the same period, Trinity hired its first professional gardener.

== Early seventeenth-century and Protectorate (1600–1664) ==
The history of Trinity in the seventeenth century was dominated by the presidencies of Trinity's third president, Ralph Kettell (president 1599 to 1643) and its eighth, Ralph Bathurst (president 1664 to 1704). Among other things, Kettell was responsible for rebuilding the dining hall (formerly Durham College's refectory) and the surrounding buildings when the hall collapsed in 1618 following excavation work in its cellar, now the college bar. The library was refurbished multiple times and its collection expanded, most notably via bequests from alumni Edward Hyndmer (1625) and Richard Rands (1640). One fellow was officially appointed shortly after Hyndmer's donation as a librarian and paid a small stipend for his duties. More minor improvements included improvements to the toilet facilities available. A "sound administrator", Kettell led several round of fundraising from former students of all grades and contributed his own funds in order to fund these developments. In addition to cash contributions, the combination of donations of plate from alumni and the institution of a compulsory "plate fund" contribution for wealthier students meant that a sizeable collection of gold and silver plate was soon established, at its peak weighing some 173 pounds (78 kg). Trinity was thus put on a firmer financial footing, with spare funds continually reinvested, largely successfully, in increasing both the quantity and quality of the accommodation on site. Also to this end, Kettell constructed Kettell Hall on adjoining land leased from Oriel College. During Kettell's time it provided accommodation for Trinity students, though its later usage until its acquisition by Trinity is less clear. The result was a steady increase in the number of commoners attending to a peak of over 100 by 1630, though many did not stay to complete their degrees. Expenditure varied enormously among students; drunkenness and gambling were among the more common vices recorded.

The 1640s were less kind to Trinity as the college, like all others in Oxford, felt the effects of the English Civil War. First there was a loan of £200 to King Charles I in 1642, never repaid; then, after a brief alternation in the garrison of Oxford, it began to be fortified by the royalist cause. On 19 January 1643, almost all Trinity's plate, valued at £537, was forfeited to the crown, never to be seen again. Of the whole collection, only one chalice, one paten and two flagons survive. Many students (and later some fellows) simply left, or were not replaced, forcing the college to let its rooms to members of the King's court (a particularly attractive offer to those who were alumni of the college). Nevertheless, the college was brought to the point of financial collapse. During the surrender of Oxford to Parliament's forces in June 1646 the representatives of both sides were Trinity graduates. During the post-surrender purge of Oxford's royalists, Trinity's President Hannibal Potter, who had replaced Kettell on his death in 1643, was one of many to be forcibly exiled after a period of quiet defiance of the order to step down. He would remain in exile for 12 years.

A post-war audit undertaken by the Parliamentary Visitors revealed Trinity to have three fellows, nine scholars, and twenty-six commoners, though two fellows, one scholar, one commoner and both bursars were soon expelled for refusing to swear their loyalty to Parliament. A new President, Robert Harris, was simply imposed upon Trinity; despite this, what little evidence exists from his ten-year Presidency suggests little in the way of turmoil. Rather, Trinity recovered slowly, and it financial health improved considerably. Harris died on 12 December 1658, with the fellows electing William Hawes as his successor before the Visitors could intervene. Hawes himself fell ill just nine months later, but conspired to resign shortly before his death, almost certainly with the intention of giving the fellows a head-start on Parliament's men once more. They elected Seth Ward, "one of the most able men to hold the presidency", but he too did not last in the role: the Restoration of the 1660s saw the return of Oxford to its pre-war personnel, including Hannibal Potter. He died, seemingly contented, in 1664. The new President was Ralph Bathurst, who had been involved with the college intermittently for many years. Boosting student numbers was, he said, his immediate priority.

== Bathurst's Trinity (1664–1704) ==
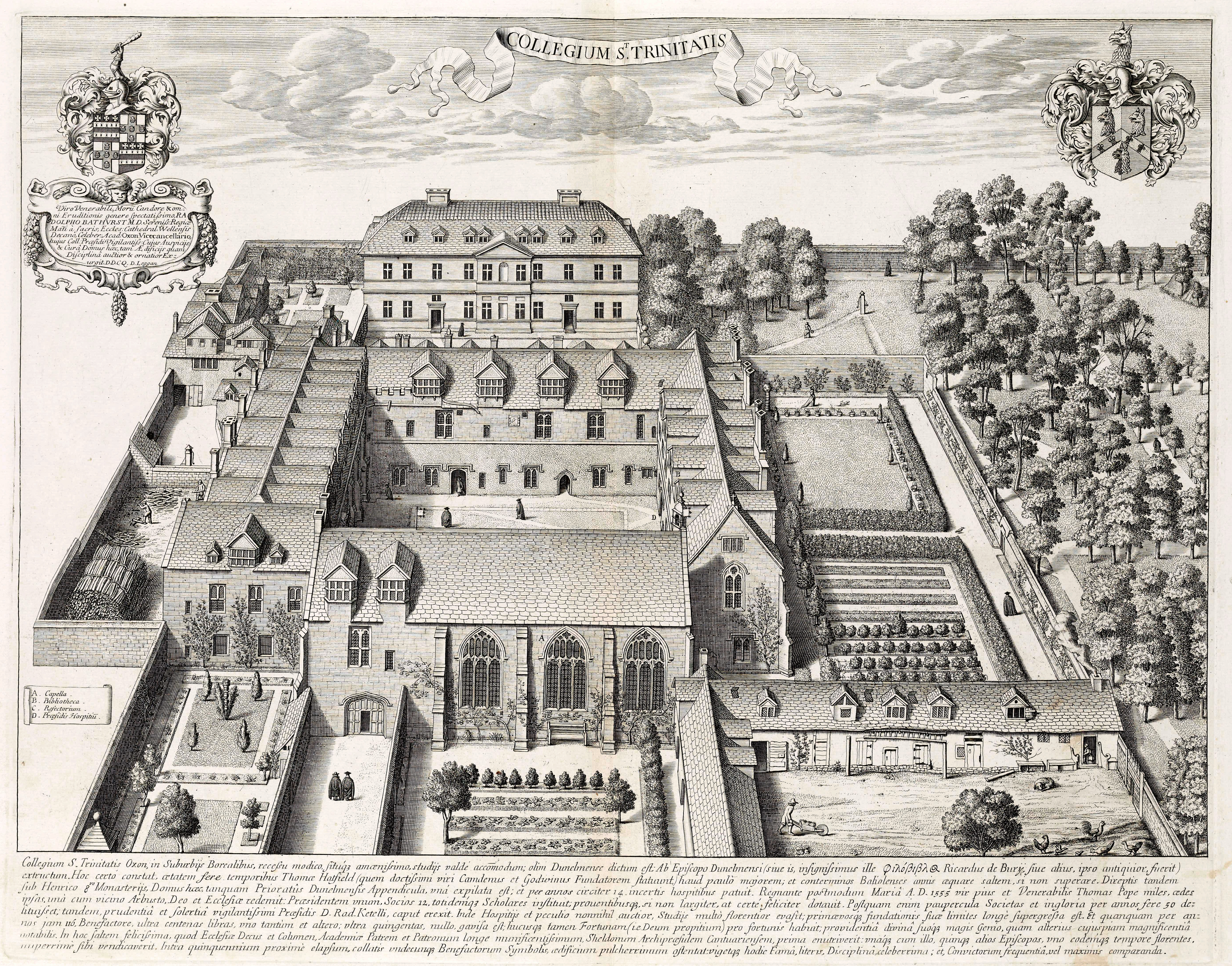
Trinity in 1675 depicted by David Loggan. This shows the northern block (top centre), completed in 1668, but no western range; that would only be finished in 1684.

Bathurst's plan, executed over some thirty years, involved the regeneration of a number of Trinity's buildings, including the early fifteenth-century chapel (which was rapidly becoming structurally unsound), and the Old Bursary, which became a common room. The old kitchen was similarly replaced in 1681, and the President's lodgings refurbished. The chapel, consecrated in April 1694 and requiring two loans to complete, is the only collegiate building to appear on the itinerary of Peter the Great during his trip to Oxford, though it is unclear whether he set foot inside it. Also constructed was a separate building – designed, like the final flourish of the chapel's design, by Sir Christopher Wren – forming the northern side of what is now the college's "Garden" quadrangle. Having raised funds from Trinity's alumni and fellows to settle the £1,500 construction costs, the new block was ready for use by 1668, though the room interior fittings were added gradually by their occupants. Bathurst's continuing desire for expansion precipitated in the creation from 1682 to 1684 of an identical block, which now forms the western side of the Garden quadrangle, as well as an eponymous "Bathurst building", pulled down in the late nineteenth century.

The result was, as Bathurst had hoped, an increase in both the quantity and average wealth of Trinity's intake; by the 1680s there were once again over a hundred students at the college. In particular, the growth was driven by the children of England's middle classes, who sought to demonstrate their wealth by attending what was fast becoming Oxford's most expensive college. Trinity did, however, continue to admit annually four or five servitors – a quarter of the intake – though the rank of batteller slowly fell out of use. The college was also changing in other ways; for example, although prayers remained compulsory, the penalties for missing them were slowly relaxed, as were curfew times. Although the college authorities were prepared to overlook poorly performing students from influential families, the timetable still included seven hours a day for all students, with an extra three hours for many. Lectures remained "in house", though their content was gradually broadening, including "experimental philosophy" in addition to the more classical education students had received previously. Students could also take advantage of the first college undergraduate library in Oxford.

== Eighteenth-century (1704–1799) ==
The eighteenth century saw far fewer variations in the college's fortunes, and it remained in much the same financial health as it was at the end of the seventeenth. Bathurst himself died in 1704, replaced in the presidency by Thomas Sykes, an inauspicious fellow of the college. By the time of the inheritance Sykes was in poor health, and he too died the next year. The new president, William Dobson, was of a similar generation to Sykes, having been a fellow for almost thirty years. Dobson was soon embroiled in controversy over the expulsion of a student, Henry Knollys, against the wishes of his tutor. Two more commoners were expelled shortly thereafter for vocally criticising the decision. He was also criticised for supporting the Whig cause in the University, to the point of breaking with established practice on the appointment of fellows. Dobson died in 1731. In his place, the fellows elected George Huddesford, who, on account of his relative youthfulness, remains the longest serving President of Trinity, occupying the position for 44 years and 292 days. Huddesford was in turn replaced by Joseph Chapman, an unexpected victor against the favourite Thomas Warton, who was by that time well known in the academic and literary worlds. Chapman saw out the rest of the century, dying in 1805.

Third storeys were added to all three sides of Garden Quadrangle in 1728, masking the flourishes of Wren's original French-style design; the dining hall was also refitted in about 1774, with Baroque replacing the earlier Gothic style. Trinity's site expanded slightly for essentially the first time since its foundation when a strip between Balliol and St. John's, the present borders of which were fixed in 1864, was purchased in several parcels between 1780 and 1787 and a cottage and latrines constructed on the site. In addition, two Trinity's three prime ministers, Lord North and William Pitt the Elder, both graduated from the college during the century, and the college library – which gained its first rules on borrowing books in 1765 – was visited regularly by Samuel Johnson. In reality, however, few Trinity students actively pursued their degrees during the period: increased living costs and a quiet relaxation of the statutes' religious requirements meant that Trinity's increasingly small annual intake tended to be drawn from the middle and upper classes, for whom a formal education was relatively unimportant. The last servitor, for example, was admitted in 1763. The culture of college had thus become quite different from the time of the foundation; revisions to the various penalties the college could impose suggest concern with both the level of alcohol consumption among students and the keeping of dogs for hunting (guns themselves being banned only in 1800). Responding, the college also introduced fixed oral examinations (the forerunner of modern collections) twice annually for all students from 1789 onwards.

== Nineteenth-century (1800–1907) ==
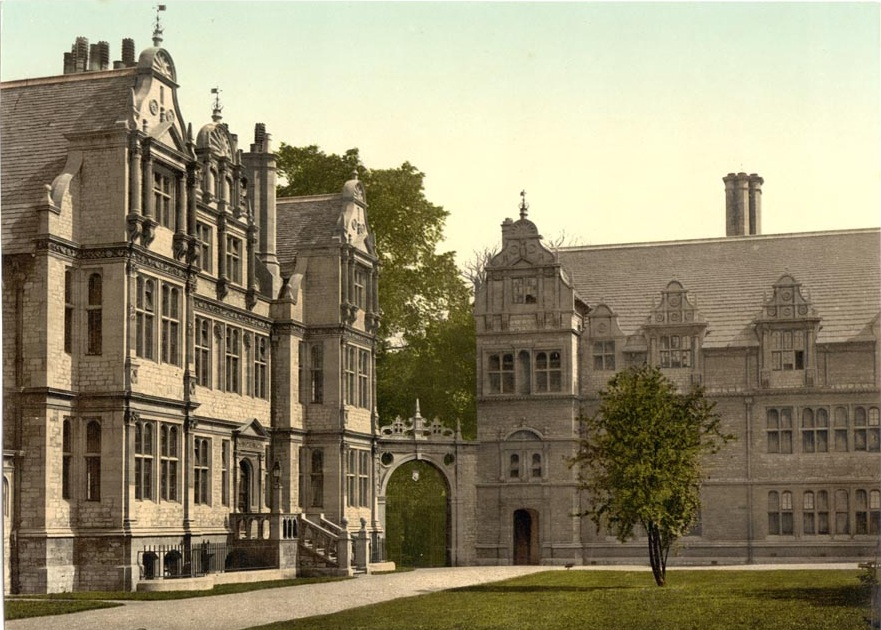
Trinity, probably in the 1890s, with the President's lodgings to the left and the "new buildings" to the right. The scene is virtually unchanged to this day.

The perceived lack of academia in Oxford was not restricted to Trinity; it was a more widespread concern that led the University to introduce the Oxford University Examination Statute at the turn of the century, restricting degrees to those who had passed a much more rigorous examination than before. On the whole, Trinity responded favourably to the impetus for educational reform during the first half of the nineteenth century. Collections were standardised and formalised in 1809, and by 1817 John Henry Newman (at that time a student) could say happily that the "increasing rigour" had caused Trinity to "become the strictest of colleges". Nevertheless, he observed that ten years had passed since the last Trinitarian had graduated with first class honours. Certainly, by the time of the Presidency of John Wilson (1850–) it was generally recognised that reform was needed both at Trinity and across the University as a whole to embed learning rather than religious instruction at its heart.

With a royal commission (established in 1850) inquiring into the practices of the university, Wilson sought to inquire into Trinity's own, proposing increased pay for lecturers in order that they could provide daily tutorials, improved library access for undergraduates and the establishment of a system of exhibitions. In this endeavour he was aided by provisions made by the royal commission such that colleges could more openly deviate from their original statutes. By 1870 eight of the fellowship no longer had religious duties and in 1882 it was deemed optional for fellows (except for the Chaplain) to have taken Holy Orders. In addition, marriage was no longer considered incompatible with a Trinity fellowship for the first time. Trinity also sought to voluntarily open its scholarships to allcomers in 1816, and from 1825 onwards it allowed ex-scholars as well as scholars to become fellows, though the position retained its religious restrictions. This was followed in the 1843 by a decision to allow students of other colleges to become fellows at Trinity.

== Blakiston's Trinity (1907–1938) ==
Herbert Blakiston was elected President on 17 March 1907 after the death of his predecessor, Henry Francis Pelham. He was the fellows' second choice for the position; their preferred candidate turned it down. Blakiston had barely left Trinity in a quarter of a century: first as a scholar, then tutor, chaplain, senior tutor and domestic bursar, not to mention the author of the college's first definitive history in 1898. Efficient but cold, eccentric but financially tight-fisted, Blakiston remained President until his resignation in 1938, continuing in the role of domestic bursar and then as "elder statesman" until his death in 1942 in a road accident.

The period was characterised by modest revelry that included drunken students regularly setting bonfires around the site; Blakiston was not greatly minded to send down students lest doing so discourage sons from other middle-class families from applying. For the same reasons, he chose to admit just one non-white student during his 24 years and to strenuously oppose the integration of female students into the university in 1920. Not unrelatedly, it was during this time that Trinity's rivalry with the more liberal Balliol also reached a temporary maximum.With the onset of the First World War in 1914, the number of undergraduates at Trinity fell dramatically. In May the college had 150 in residence; by the end of the year the number was closer to 30, and by the end of the war it was in single digits. Blakiston wrote to the bereaved families, of which there were soon many, including the family of Noel Chavasse (died 1917), one of three British soldiers ever to be awarded the Victoria Cross with bar. With so few paying students, college finances were weak, and many of the staff, including Blakiston, took sizeable pay cuts. Revenue from rooms requisitioned by the armed forces eased the college's longer term outlook; the construction of a new bathhouse at Trinity was also undertaken by its new residents, apparently at no cost. In addition to the exit of so many students, several fellows also volunteered for army service. Consequently, Blakiston was forced to take on greater administrative duties at both the collegiate and university levels, including the Vice-Chancellorship of the university (1917–1920). Nevertheless, he remained firmly "a college man", and most of his later involvement with university politics centred on the retention of Trinity's independence.

In total, 820 Trinitarians or ex-Trinitarians served in the war; 153 did not survive it. Nevertheless, the peace saw Trinity revitalised, back up to full numbers within two years. In 1919, Blakiston began the task of identifying a suitable monument to the dead; it was his suggestion, a new library, which carried the day. The new library, which opened in 1928, was funded via benefactions; of which there were many. Blakiston took a personal interest in the design, though his flourishes to the entrance-way were later removed to accommodate the construction of a new housing block adjacent to the library. Nevertheless, the middle class–dominated Trinity remained better known for its sport than its academics during the period (the research of fellow Cyril Hinshelwood being one exception to this trend). Other building work included the restoration of the chapel, renovation of the cottages (now staircase 1) and the construction of a new bathhouse.

== Recent history (1939–present) ==
By comparison with the First World War, Trinity was not greatly affected by the outbreak of the Second in September 1939, aided by the University-wide introduction of courses specially structured for budding officers and the booking out of the New Buildings to host Balliol students after the latter's own accommodation was requisitioned. The number of students remained strong as that at other colleges diminished, with Trinity able to utilise its contacts to maintain a good standard of living despite the shortages. Nevertheless, casualties were almost as bad as quarter of a decade previously; in total, some 133 Old Trinitarians died serving, a disproportionate number in the RAF, as was common with Oxford students in general. Membership of the Fellows' Senior Common Room was also particularly diminished, during the war years at least.

The post-war period has seen a substantial increase in the number of students at Trinity, though as of 2013 it remains one of the smallest in Oxford. New accommodation in the form of the Cumberbatch buildings (the modern staircases 3 and 4) were opened in 1966, and the college also benefited greatly from the university-wide effort to re-face the many stone buildings around Oxford that had blackened over the centuries. The replacement of the plasterwork in the hall was completed just in time for Trinity to host the Queen, her husband Prince Philip, and the Prime Minister Harold Macmillan in 1960 upon the laying of the foundation stone of St Catherine's College by the Queen. The increase in the number of graduate students prompted the creation of a dedicated Middle Common Room in 1964. There was also a similar increase in the number of Fellows. The costs of expansion were funded mostly through benefactions, though the funds received from Blackwell's for the construction and lease of the subterranean Norrington Room (named after the then-President Arthur Norrington) also proved useful. Later additions included outside properties at Rawlinson Road (1970) and Staverton Road (1986) and the construction of an eighteenth on-site staircase (1992).

With the broadening of state funding for poorer students, Trinity's pre-war attachment to the middle classes looked increasing outmoded; the college found it difficult to throw off its reputation for racism. The rivalry with Balliol was reinvigorated, leading to several well-publicised events, including the blacking up of the Trinity first VIII rowing team (1952) and the turfing of the Trinity JCR by Balliol students (1963). Slowly, however, most of the college's stricter traditions fell away. The period of liberalisation accelerated under Norrington's successor Alexander Ogston. Trinity gained its first female lecturer in 1968, overnight guests were allowed from 1972 and weekend guests from 1974, and the late-night curfew was effectively abolished in 1977. By that time, college had also shifted from the employment of college servants to a professionalised body of staff more in keeping with the realities of post-war jobs market. The result was that breakfast and lunch became self-service as a result and the first on-site student kitchen facilities provided in 1976. In addition, the JCR started taking direct control of its own funds from 1972. By far the most significant change, however, was the admission of the first women to Trinity from October 1979, though the transition was ultimately a smooth one. The first female fellow was elected in 1984, completing the shift in day-to-day workings from monastic priory to modern college.

In 2017, the college's first woman president, Hilary Boulding, celebrated sixteen women alumni in a poster and booklet entitled "Feminae Trinitatis". They included Dame Frances Ashcroft, Siân Berry, Dame Sally Davies, Olivia Hetreed, Kate Mavor, Sarah Oakley, Roma Tearne, and the opera singer Claire Booth.

In 2019, the Cumberbatch Building was demolished to make way for the new Levine Building. This was due to be finished at the end of 2021 and to include 46 new student bedrooms, an auditorium, teaching rooms, a function room, and a café. It is named in recognition of Peter Levine, who studied at Trinity in the 1970s, whose transformational donation in memory of his parents allowed this project, and many other notable college-wide initiatives, to take shape.

The grounds of Trinity were, in part, the basis for Fleet College in Charles Finch's The Last Enchantments.

== Bibliography ==
- Blakiston, Herbert E.D. (1898), Trinity College, University of Oxford: College Histories, London: F.E. Robinson.
- Hopkins, Clare (2007) [2005], Trinity: 450 years of an Oxford college community, Oxford, ISBN 978-0-19-951896-8.
- Maclagan, Michael (1955), Trinity College 1555–1955, Oxford.
