= Antony Bek (bishop of Durham) =

13th and 14th-century Bishop of Durham

- Patriarch of Jerusalem(1306–1311); Bishop of Durham
- Arms of Antony Bek, Bishop of Durham: Gules, a cross moline (also recerclée) ermine, as blazoned in the Gelre Roll of Arms and the Falkirk Roll of c. 1298, listing the knights who fought with King Edward I at the Battle of Falkirk. They appear on his seal and on Episcopal Durham Penny coins minted by him at Durham. These arms are a difference of his paternal arms: Gules, a cross moline (recerclée) argent
- Elected: 9 July 1283
- Installed: 25 December 1285
- Term ended: 3 March 1311
- Predecessor: Robert of Holy Island
- Successor: Richard Kellaw
- Other post: Archdeacon of Durham

Orders
- Consecration: 9 January 1284 by Archbishop William Wickwane

Personal details
- Died: 3 March 1311 Eltham
- Buried: 3 May 1311; Durham Cathedral
- Denomination: Roman Catholic

Ordination history of Antony Bek
History
Episcopal consecration
- Principal consecrator: William Wickwane
- Co-consecrators: Oliver Sutton, Robert Burnell, John of Pontoise, William Middleton, Ralph Ireton, C.R.S.A., Henry of Whithorn-Galloway, and Thomas Beck
- Date: 9 January 1284
- Place: York, Archdiocese of York
Episcopal succession
Bishops consecrated by Antony Bek as principal consecrator
- John of Halton, C.R.S.A.: 14 September 1292
- William Hotham, O.P.: ?? ???? 1297
- Henry Newark: 15 June 1298

Antony Bek (also spelled Beck and Beke; c. 1245 – 3 March 1311) was a bishop of Durham and the Patriarch of Jerusalem (1306–1311).

== Early life ==
Bek and his elder brother Thomas Bek were members of a family of knights. Their father was Walter Bek, who held lands at Eresby in Lincolnshire. Another brother was John Beke, 1st Baron Beke of Eresby, who held the family lands in Eresby. Walter had married Eve, the niece of Walter de Gray, Archbishop of York. Bek was born about 1245 and was Walter's third son. Both Thomas and Antony were educated at Oxford University, where they studied from 1267 to 1270.

Having entered the clergy, Bek received several benefices and soon attracted the attention of the Lord Edward, the heir of King Henry III of England. He was Archdeacon of Durham by 1275, as well as precentor of York and held prebends at Lichfield, London, and Wells. Bek accompanied Edward when the prince went on Crusade in 1270. When Edward returned from crusading, he appointed Bek to the office of Keeper of the wardrobe on 21 September 1274, but Bek held the office for only about a month, and was replaced in October with his brother Thomas Bek. Edward named Bek the constable of the Tower of London in 1275. In November 1277 Bek was one of the councillors sent by Edward to negotiate with Llywelyn ap Gruffudd, Prince of Wales. The result was the Treaty of Aberconwy which required Llywelyn to give up hostages, pay a large fine, give up claims to some lands and pay homage to King Edward. Bek was also sent to Aragon to negotiate the marriage of Edward's daughter Eleanor to the heir of Aragon, Alfonso.

== Bishop of Durham ==
Edward I secured Bek's election as bishop of Durham in 1283. He was elected on 9 July 1283 and consecrated on 9 January 1284. During his consecration, Bek had the remains of Saint William of York moved to a new shrine in York Minster. Bek was enthroned at Durham Cathedral on 25 December 1285. Bek was sent to Scotland after the death of King Alexander III of Scotland in 1286, to act on Edward's behalf for Alexander's heir Margaret of Norway, who was bethrothed to Edward's son Prince Edward. However, Margaret died soon after this, and Edward was brought in to decide the succession of the Scottish throne. Bek was employed by King Edward in the negotiations and also served as a spokesman. In November 1292, Edward decided in favor of John Balliol, and Bek assisted in the enthronement of Balliol at Scone soon after.

== Service for Edward I ==
In 1293, Bek was excommunicated by the Archbishop of York because Bek had allowed the king's officers to arrest two clerks while Bek was in Scotland on a royal mission. In response, a legal case was brought against the archbishop in Parliament alleging that because Bek was acting as the king's officer at the time, he wasn't acting as bishop but as earl palatine, and thus the excommunication was actually an affront to the royal dignity. Before the case could be decided, the archbishop yielded and was fined. In 1294 the king sent Bek, along with others, on a diplomatic errand to the German king Adolf of Nassau and the archbishop of Cologne. The embassy was attempting to secure allies for Edward's war against King Philip IV of France.

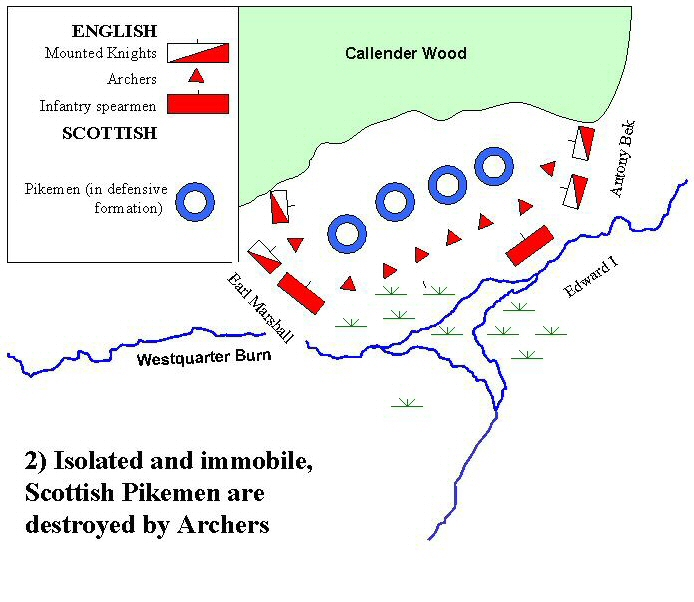
The second phase of the Battle of Falkirk

Taking part in Edward's campaigns in Scotland, the bishop received the surrender of King John I of Scotland at Brechin in 1296, and led one division of the English army at the Battle of Falkirk in 1298. During the Falkirk campaign, but before the battle itself, a section of the army under Bek captured Dirleton Castle.

In 1300, soon after his return to England, Bek became involved in a quarrel with Richard de Hoton, Prior of Durham and the cathedral chapter. Both Hoton and the chapter were attempting to assert their independence from oversight by the bishop. Bek deposed and excommunicated the prior, and locked the cathedral and the priory up. Appeals from both sides were made to the king, but the prior had previously secured the support of several of the king's advisors. Attempts to secure a negotiated settlement failed, and other disputes over lands and rights escalated the dispute. At sometime after 1301 the king confiscated the lands of the bishop. A settlement in 1303 which restored the bishop's lands, did not settle the dispute between the prior and the bishop. In 1304, further charges were brought against the bishop by the prior and the cathedral chapter, including a serious one of imprisoning a royal messenger. The issue of the messenger led to the lands of the bishop once more being confiscated in 1305. The bishop secured the support of Pope Clement V who named Bek Patriarch of Jerusalem on 26 February 1306. Further actions against the bishop were stopped by the death of the king in 1307.

== Service under Edward II ==
Bek conducted the funeral service for King Edward I on 27 October 1307 at Westminster Abbey. In September, shortly after the death of Edward I, Edward II restored Bek's lands and rights. Bek's title of patriarch made him the senior ecclesiastic in England, and it was probably due to that status that he was named the main investigator of the Templars in 1308. In 1309, he finally managed to visit the priory at Durham, and the new prior announced that he and the chapter would not institute any more legal proceedings against the bishop stemming from the dispute.

== Death and legacy ==
The bishop died at Eltham Palace near London on 3 March 1311. He was buried on 3 May 1311 in Durham Cathedral. Bek served as an important advisor to King Edward I throughout most of his term as bishop, only losing that status at the end of Edward's reign due to the dispute with the Durham prior. His extravagance was legendary, and his retinue was large, and consisted of 140 knights. Bek was a wealthy man, and his personal estate at his death was valued at 6000 marks. He built at Auckland Castle, Somerton Castle in Lincolnshire and elsewhere. He also built Durham Castle's Great Hall. Some efforts were made after the bishop's death to have him canonized, but nothing came of these efforts. Bek was known for his chastity and bravery also.

Bek's elder brother, Thomas Bek, was Bishop of St David's and a trusted servant of Edward I. Two other relations were Thomas Bek, who was Bishop of Lincoln, and Antony Bek, who was Bishop of Norwich.

== Notes ==
Catholic Church titles
Preceded by Landolf	Latin Patriarch of Jerusalem; 1306–1311	Succeeded by Pierre Pleinecassagne
Preceded by Robert of Holy Island	Bishop of Durham; 1284–1310	Succeeded by Richard Kellaw
