= John Fossor =

Prior of Durham

- Born: 1283 or 1285
- Died: 1374
- Occupation: Prior of Durham

John Fossor was Prior of Durham from 1341 until his death in 1374.

== Life ==
Fossor became Prior of Durham in 1341. The two seals of Fossor cost 8d.

In 1342 Fossor criticized the sheriff of Durham for not paying his share of incomes from the pleas in the Bishop's court. Bishop Richard de Bury issued a mandate to the sheriff ordering him to pay. The later refusal of the sheriff of Durham to deliver tenants of the priory to Prior Fossor meant that Fossor once again petitioned the Bishop in a letter.

In 1346 before the Battle of Neville's Cross Fossor led the Durham monks to raise the holy corporax cloth from St. Cuthbert's tomb on Maiden's Bower during a vigil. Before the battle the Scottish army sacked Beaurepaire Manor House, and Fossor ordered it to be rebuilt and extended to also house the monks of the priory. Fossor wrote a letter regarding the battle to Thomas Hatfield, the Bishop of Durham, which is now considered to be one of the most important sources of information for the battle.

In Durham Cathedral circa 1350 the Jesse window in the west wall of the nave and the window of the Four Doctors in the north transept were inserted by Fossor. Between 1365 and 1370 Fossor also built the kitchen of the monastery.

On 21 February 1371 a bond of the Vicar of Northallerton, John of Hayton, to the Prior of Durham in £1000 to pay an annual pension of 20 marks at Pentecost and Martinmas from 1371, 25 marks in 1376 and £20 each following year was written.

During Fossor's time as Prior of Durham Edward III gave to Durham Cathedral alabaster ornaments of the Holy Trinity and the Blessed Virgin. Near his death Fossor commissioned the Neville Screen in Durham Cathedral, costing either £500 or 500 marks.

He died in 1374, living until nearly ninety years of age. His body was wrapped in an oxhide.

Catholic Church titles
Preceded by William de Cowton	Prior of Durham; 1341–1374	Succeeded by Robert Berrington of Walworth
