= Durham Priory =

Priory in Durham, England

Coordinates: 54.77321°N 1.57683°W

Priory of St Cuthbert, Durham
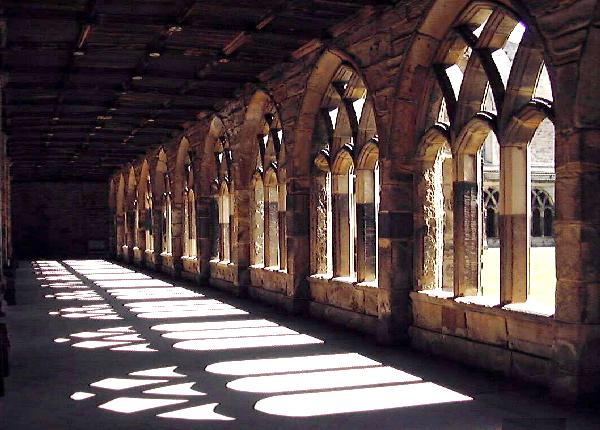
- The cloister of Durham Cathedral
- Interactive map of Priory of St Cuthbert, Durham

Monastery information
- Order: Benedictine
- Established: 1083
- Disestablished: 1539
- Mother house: Independent
- Dedication: St Cuthbert
- Diocese: Durham

Site
- Location: Durham, County Durham, England
- Visible remains: Intact
- Public access: Yes

Durham Priory was a Benedictine priory associated with Durham Cathedral, in Durham in the north-east of England. Its head was the Prior of Durham. It was founded in 1083 as a Roman Catholic monastery, but after Dissolution of the Monasteries in 1540 the priory was dissolved and the cathedral was taken over by the Church of England.

== History ==
From the time when Bishop Aldhun in 995 brought the body of St. Cuthbert from Chester-le-Street and built 'the White Church on Dunholme' for its reception, the church was served by a body of secular clergy to whom generous gifts of lands, &c., had been made by Cnut and other benefactors.

The secular canons, with their wives and children, were driven out by Bishop William, and replaced by the monks of the newly restored monasteries of Wearmouth and Jarrow. To this course, in which he was supported by both papal and royal authority, the bishop was moved by the appalling state of desolation to which his diocese had been reduced. Three times during the previous fourteen years it had been deluged with blood and fire. The few inhabitants who survived were in a state of penury; the country lay wild and waste; and even the church itself was plundered and neglected. The bishop, anxious for the restoration alike of religion and of civilization in his diocese, and finding on inquiry that St. Cuthbert, whether living or dead, had ever been served by monks, determined to found a monastery in the place where the saint's body lay; and in the end carried out his design, though not without some remonstrance from the ejected canons, only one of whom could be induced to take the monastic vows and remain in his former home.

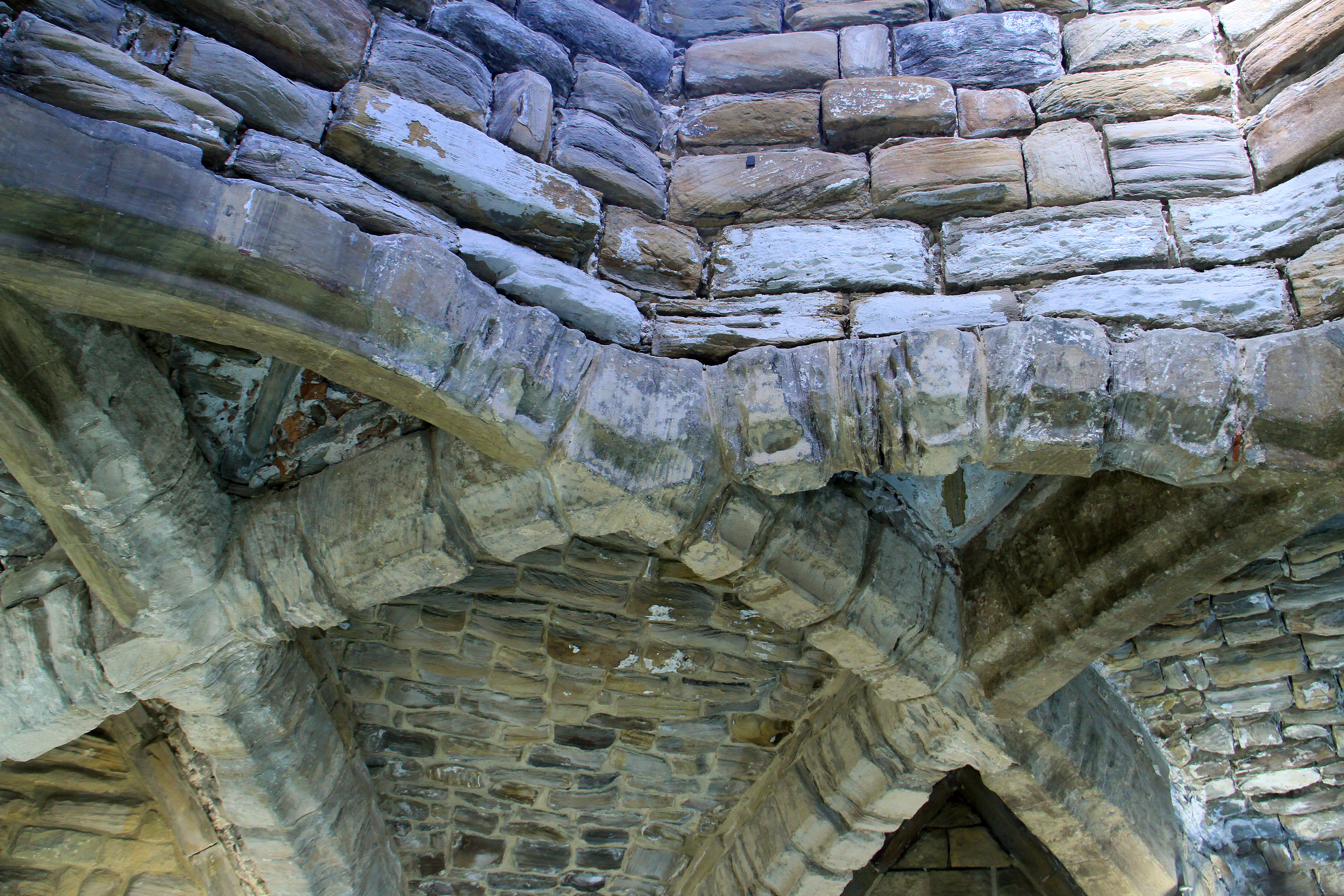
Vault of the prior's kitchen

Historically, Durham Priory was one of the most important land owners in County Durham along with the Bishop of Durham until the Dissolution of the Monasteries by Henry VIII. Until then, Durham Priory was home to between 50 and 100 Benedictine monks, making it the largest and wealthiest monastery in the area. It had cells at Coldingham Priory (until 1462), Jarrow and Monkwearmouth, Finchale, Farne, Holy Island, Lythe, Stamford and Durham College, Oxford (after 1381).

The Bishop of Durham was the temporal lord of the palatinate, often referred to as a Prince-bishop. The bishop competed for power with the Prior of Durham who held his own courts for his free tenants. An agreement dated about 1229, known as Le Convenit was entered into to regulate the relationship between the two magnates. The rituals of the medieval priory are unusually well-understood, because in 1593 a former monk wrote them in a book generally now known as The Rites of Durham.

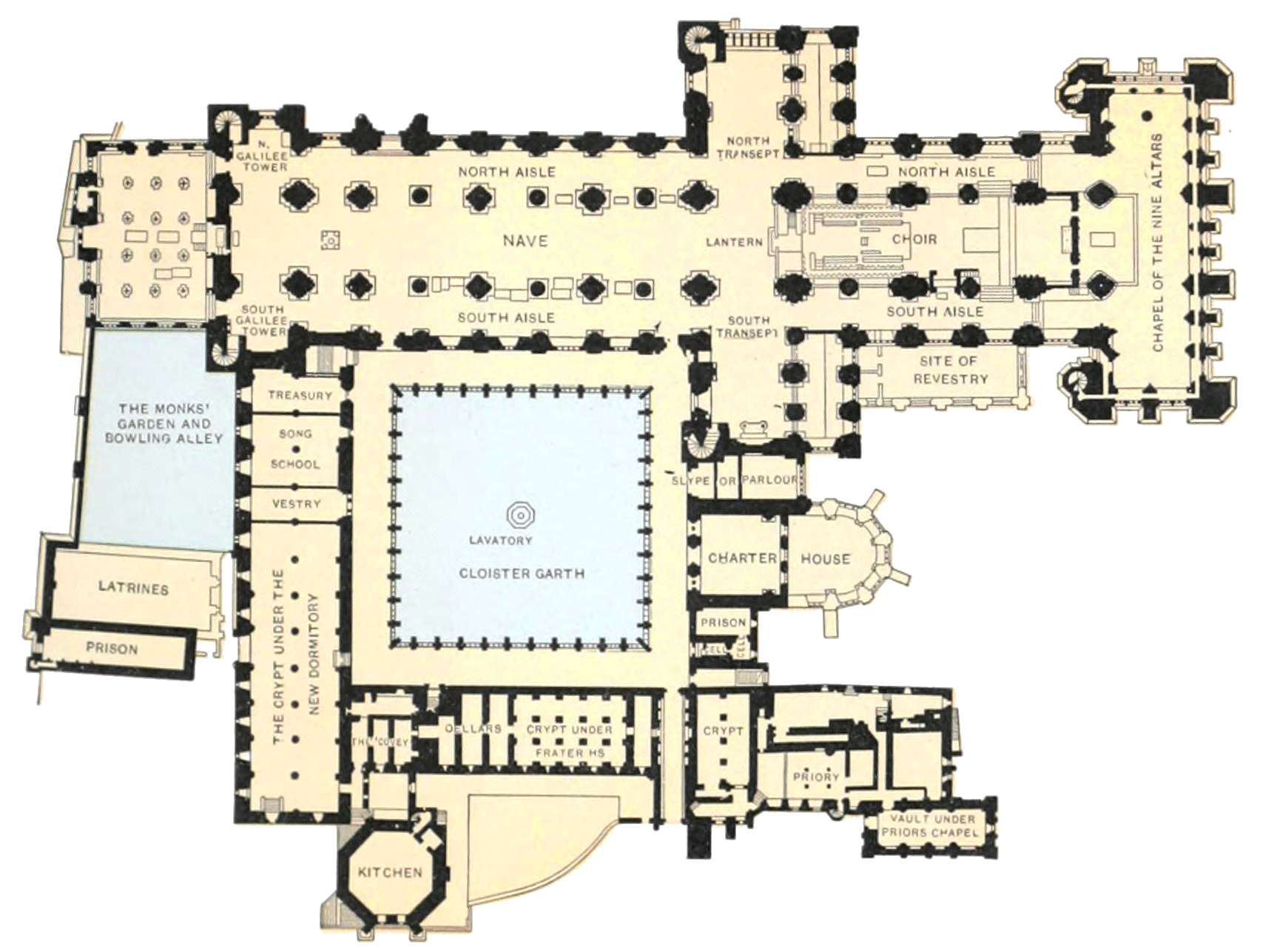
Plan of the priory, arranged around a cloister to the south of the cathedral church.

After the Benedictine monastery was dissolved, the last Prior of Durham, Hugh Whitehead, became the first dean of the cathedral's secular chapter. The priory's buildings still survive largely intact, albeit restored. They include the cloister, chapter house, refectory, kitchen, cellarium, dormitory (now the cathedral museum), prior's house (now the deanery) and gatehouse. Many of the buildings in The College, formerly the priory's outer court, incorporate remains of the service buildings, such as granaries.

Durham Priory held many manuscripts; in the 21st century, steps were under way to digitise the books, originating from the 6th to the 16th century. The project was being undertaken in a partnership by Durham University and Durham Cathedral.

== Gallery ==
The monastic buildings, viewed from the cathedral tower.

The cloister, looking towards the chapter house

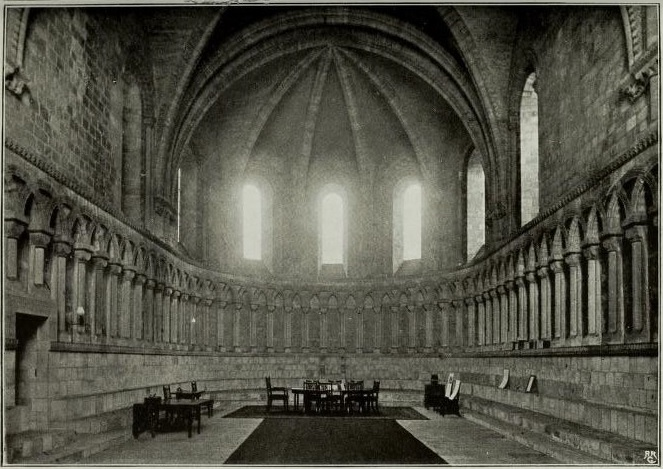
The chapter house, largely rebuilt in the 19th century

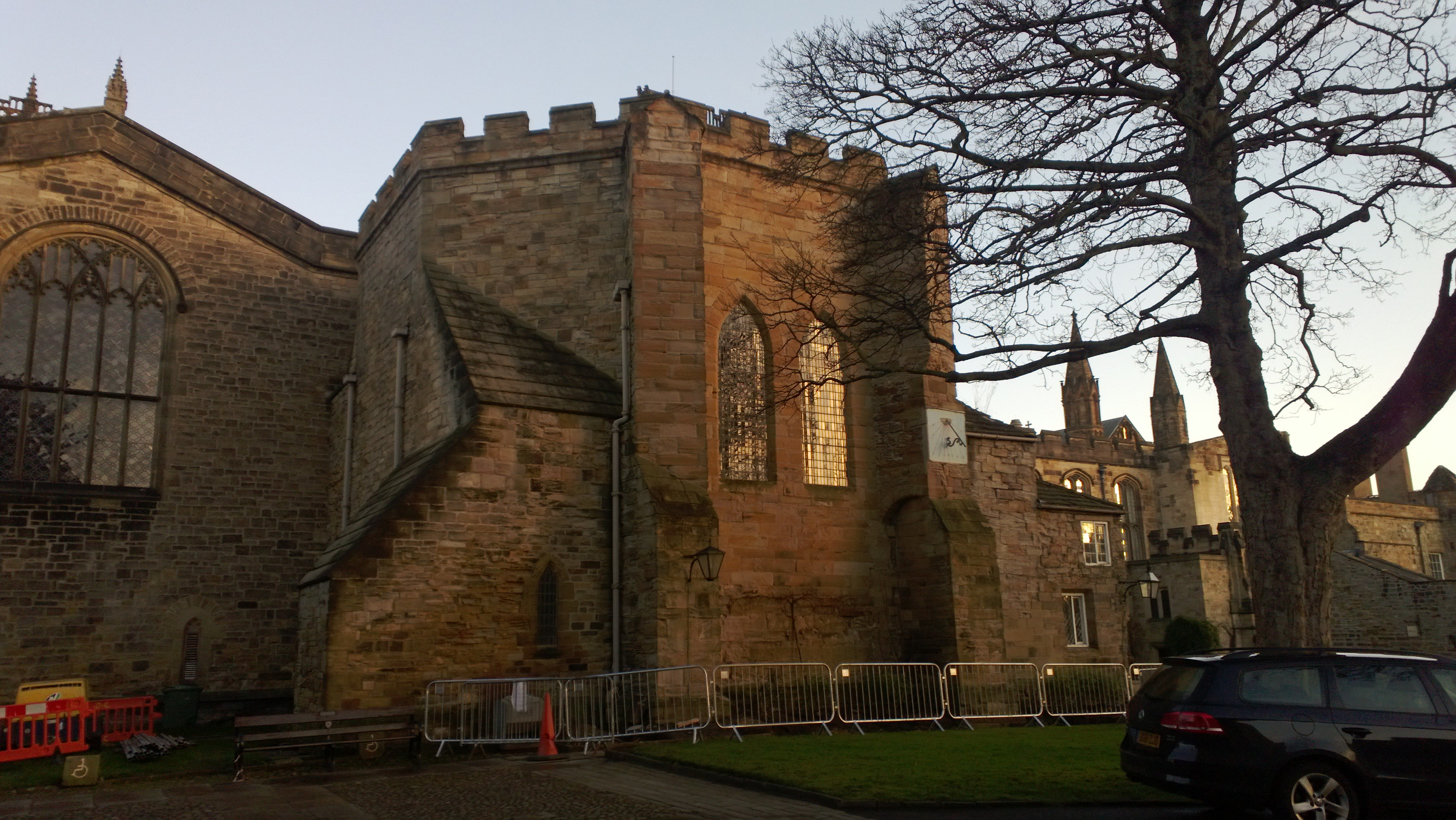
The kitchen, designed by John Lewyn

The late 14th century dormitory roof

The cellarium, or Undercroft

The prior's chapel

Mural painting in the prior's house

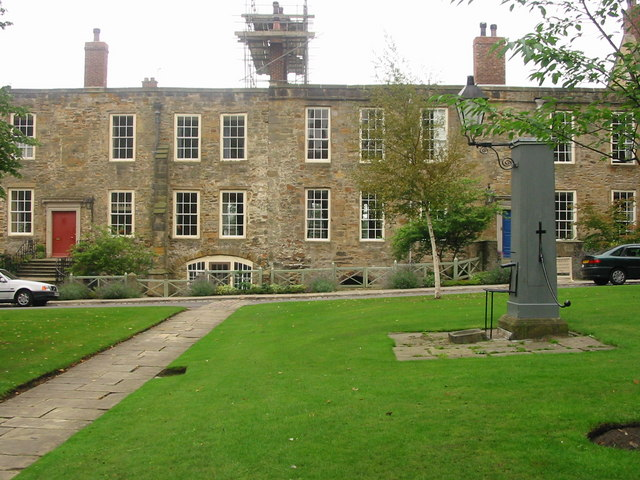
The College, formerly the priory's outer courtyard

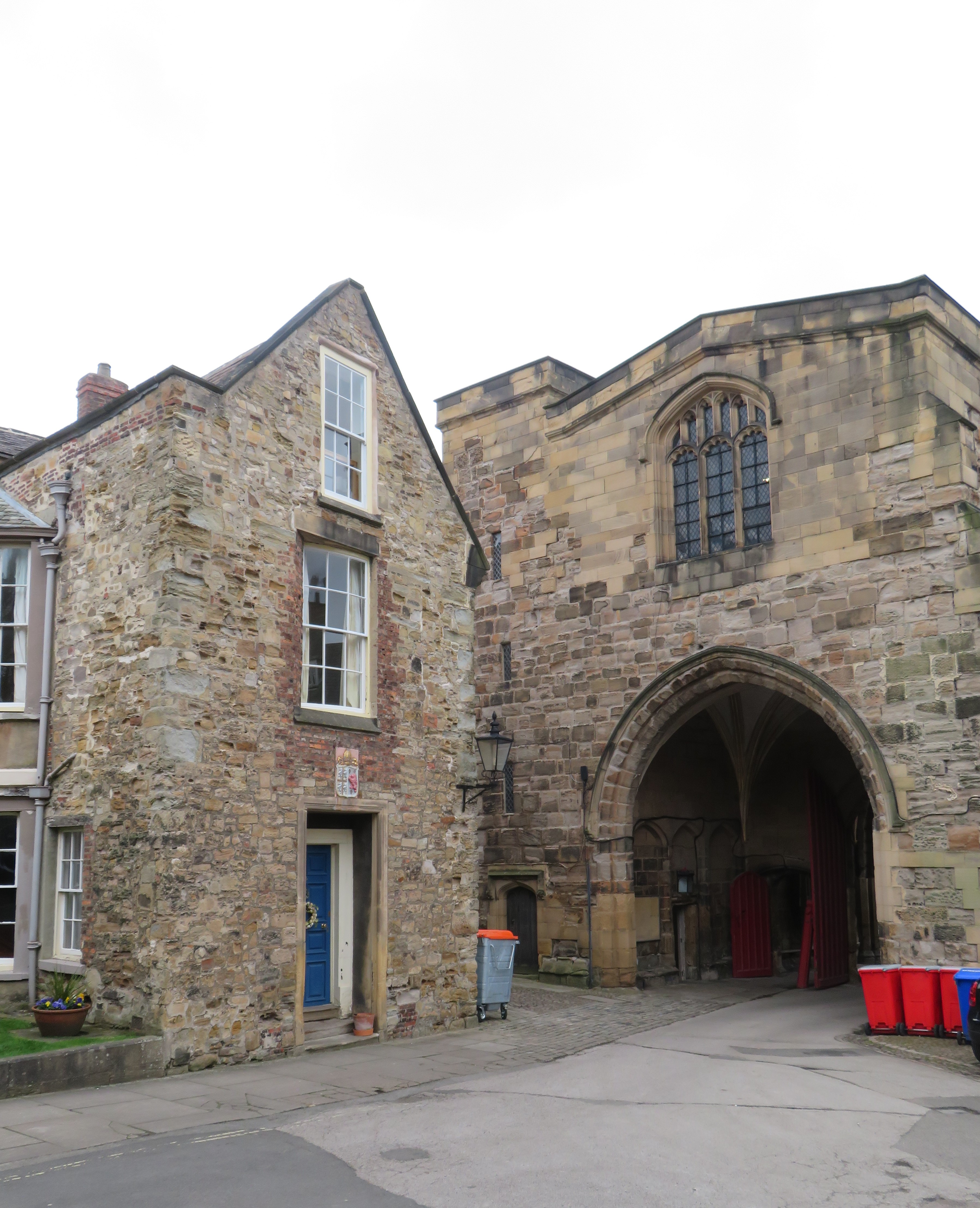
Gatehouse to The College
