= Arthur Yeldard =

English clergyman and academic

Arthur Yeldard (c.1530–1599) was an English clergyman and academic, chosen as the first Fellow and second President of Trinity College, Oxford.

== Life ==
Yeldard was born at Houghton-Strother in Tynedale, Northumberland. He matriculated as a sizar of Clare Hall, Cambridge in 1544. He graduated B.A. in 1547–8 and M.A. in 1552, and occurs as a fellow of Pembroke Hall, Cambridge in 1551–4, acting as junior treasurer in 1551. It appears from his dedication to Queen Mary of a Latin version of Documenta quaedam admonitoria Agapeti Diaconi that he was at Dilling in Flanders in December 1553, acting as tutor to Henry and Anthony, the sons of Sir Anthony Denny, who matriculated at Cambridge in 1552. He also states that he had received an exhibition from Mary when princess through her confessor, Francis Mallett.

On 30 May 1556, Yeldard was admitted one of the original fellows of Trinity College, Oxford, and was incorporated M.A. on 12 November. He assisted the founder, Sir Thomas Pope, and the first president, Thomas Slythurst, in the composition of the Latin statutes, acted as philosophy lecturer, and is frequently mentioned in the founder's letters, particularly as tutor to his stepson, John Basford. On 23 September 1559, after the deprivation of Slythurst on the accession of Elizabeth I after refusing to take the Oath of Supremacy Yeldard was selected by the foundress to be President. Two difficult decades followed, first with Slythurst sent to the Tower of London, and then quite a number of the new Fellows following the prompting of Catholic sympathies and leaving. Robert Horne as Visitor was still asking for changes to the Catholic atmosphere of worship in 1570. Yeldard seems to have shown care and tact as President, husbanding the Durham College buildings, and averting any serious disasters at the visitations of 1560 to 1570.

Yeldard graduated B.D., in 1583 and D.D. in 1586. He was instituted to the annexed rectory of Garsington (south of Oxford) in 1562, and also held the college living of Great Waltham, Essex, in 1572–4. He was nominated Vice-Chancellor of the University of Oxford by Robert Dudley, 1st Earl of Leicester in July 1580, holding office for a year; and his name occurs on various university committees, such as those for the reception of Queen Elizabeth in 1566 and 1592, for a conference with Antonio del Corro in 1578, for the reception of Albert à Lasco in 1583, and for the reform of the statutes in 1576. He died on 1 or 2 February 1599, and was buried in the college chapel.

== Sources ==
- This article incorporates text from a publication now in the public domain: "Yeldard, Arthur". Dictionary of National Biography. London: Smith, Elder & Co. 1885–1900.

Academic offices
Preceded by Thomas Slythurst	President of Trinity College, Oxford; 1559–1599	Succeeded by Ralph Kettell
Preceded by Tobias Matthew	Vice-Chancellor of Oxford University; 1580–1581	Succeeded by William James
