= Maiden's Bower =

Bronze Age round cairn in Durham, England

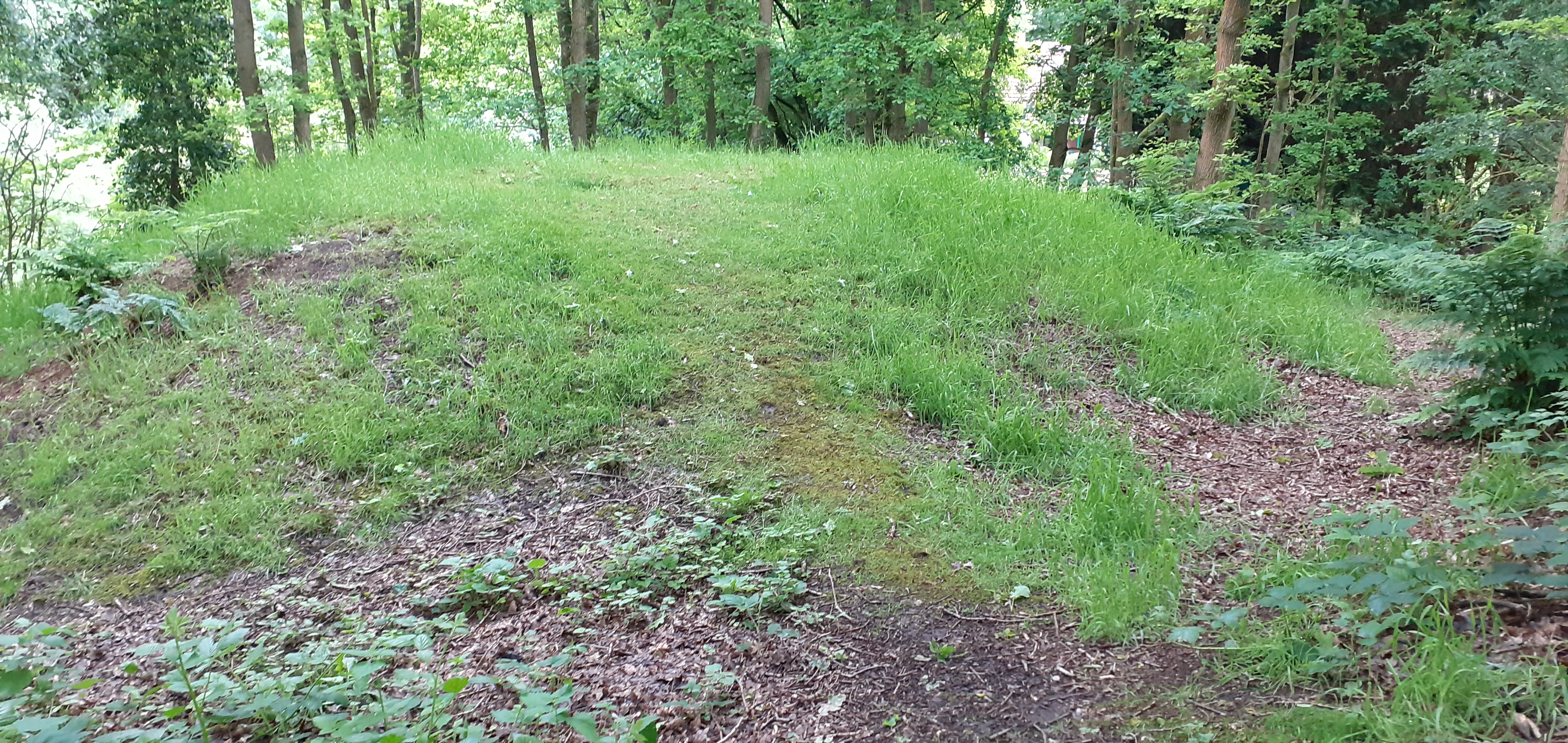
- A close-up picture of Maiden's Bower taken in May 2024
- Interactive map of Maiden's Bower
- 54.7787°N 1.5905°W
- Type: Round barrow
- Periods: Bronze Age
- Location: Durham
- Region: County Durham
- OS grid reference: NZ 26437 42715

Site notes
- Public access: Yes

Scheduled monument
- Official name: Maiden's Bower round cairn
- Designated: 14 December 1926
- Reference no.: 1008843

Maiden's Bower is a Bronze Age round cairn built in Flass Vale Nature Reserve, in Durham, England. It is a scheduled monument with a list entry number of 1008843.

== Description ==
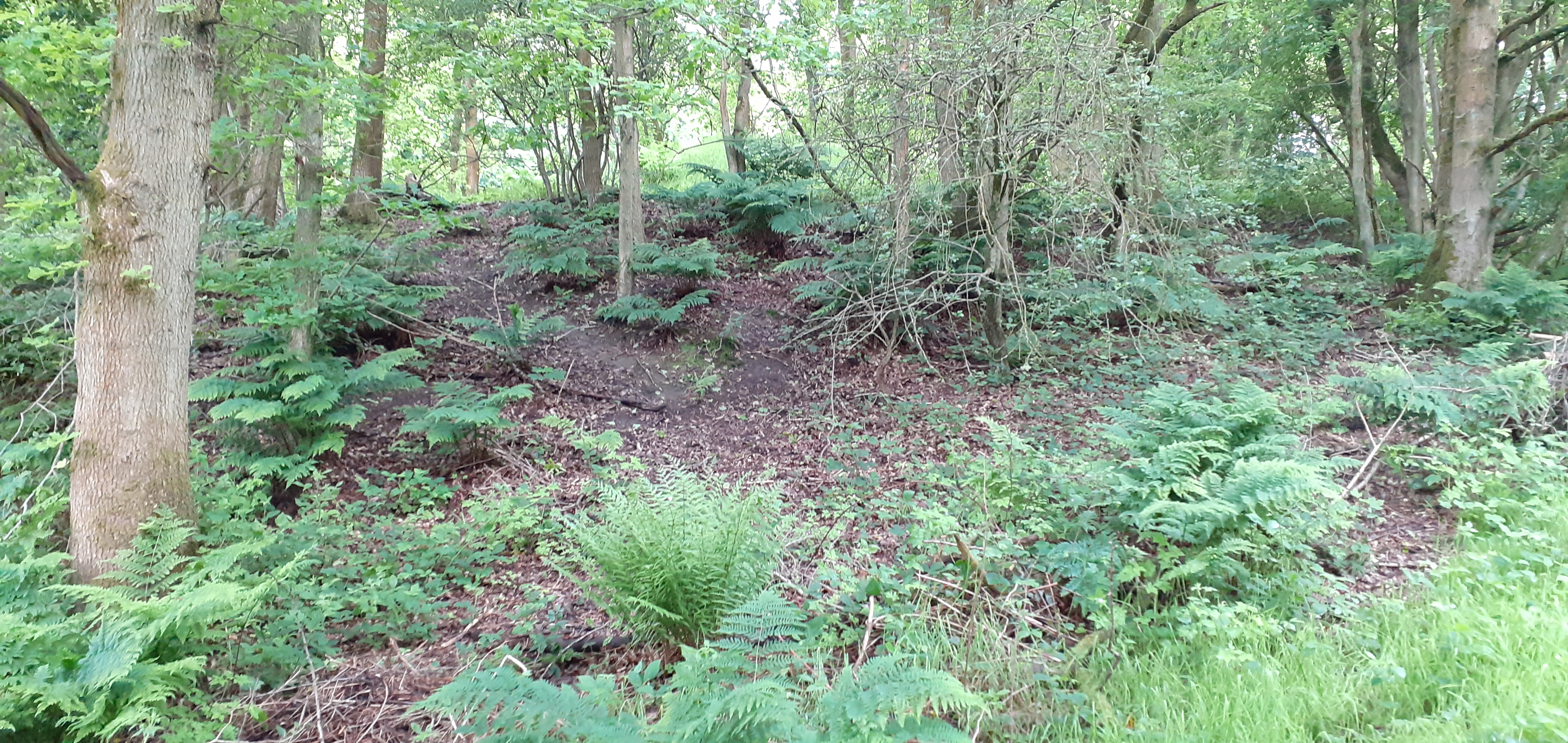
A view of Maiden's Bower from nearby public footpath in May 2024

The flat-topped cairn measures 8.5 metres in diameter and stands to a maximum height of 1.5 metres.

It is surrounded by a level berm 3.5 metres wide. On the south-western side there are visible traces of a surrounding ditch, 0.3 metres deep and 2 metres wide.

== Location ==
Maiden's Bower is located in North East England, County Durham, Durham, in the south-west corner of the Flass Vale Nature Reserve. The cairn is situated on the north-eastern end of a ridge overlooking the Wear Valley.

== History ==
Maiden's Bower dates back to around 3,000 years ago, when people settled in the area and started clearing Flass Vale for pasture.

The earliest recorded mention of Maiden's Bower was in 1346. Before the Battle of Neville's Cross the Durham monks, led by Prior John Fossor, raised the holy corporax cloth from St. Cuthbert's tomb as a banner on the cairn during a vigil. During the battle clergymen from Durham Cathedral used the slope around Maiden's Bower as a vantage point. A wooden cross to commemorate the victory of the battle stood on Maiden's Bower until 1569.

Maiden's Bower was protected as a scheduled monument in 1926, and in 1990 Flass Vale was designated as a local wildlife site.

In 2023 geophysical and earthwork surveys were conducted at Maiden's Bower led by Durham University.
