= Durham College, Oxford =

Former college of the University of Oxford

Durham College
- University of Oxford
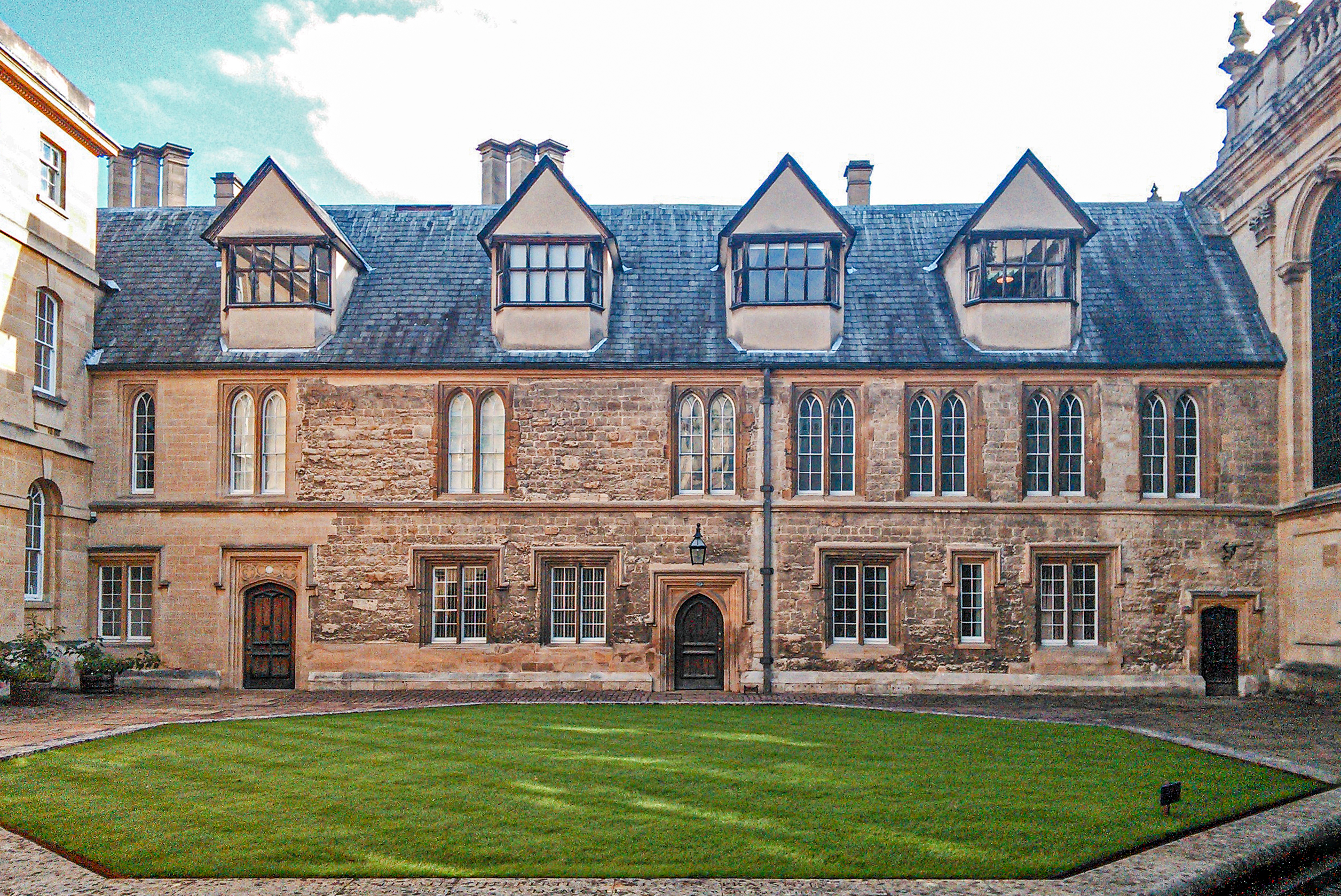
- College library (c.1417–18), now part of Trinity College's Durham Quadrangle

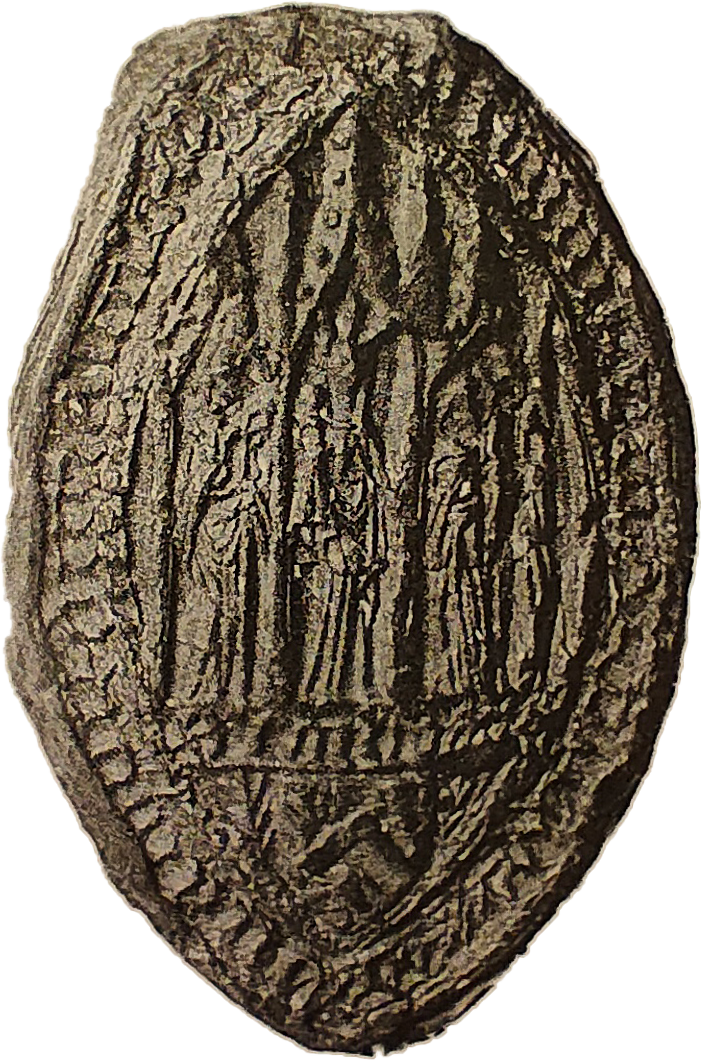
- Common seal of the college, 1438
- Location: Between St Giles' and Broad Street
- Coordinates: 51.7553°N 1.25718°W
- Latin name: Collegium Monachorum Dunelmiensium Oxon
- Founder: Richard de Hoton or Hugh of Darlington; Thomas Hatfield (endowment)
- Established: c. 1286; endowed 1381
- Closed: 1545
- Named after: Durham Priory
- Former names: Durham Hall until 1381
- Status: Closed; estates returned to the dean and chapter of Durham, buildings used to found Trinity College, Oxford
- Visitor: The Bishop of Durham after 1381

Map
- Location within Oxford city centre

Durham College, also known as Durham Hall until 1381, was a college of the University of Oxford. It was established as a cell of Durham Priory in the late 13th century, and endowed as a college by Bishop Thomas Hatfield in 1381.

The college was closed in 1545 following the dissolution of the monasteries. After a period of disuse, its buildings were sold in 1555 to Thomas Pope, who used them to found Trinity College, Oxford, where the college library and some other architectural fragments survive as part of Durham Quadrangle. Its estates were returned to the Dean and Chapter of Durham Cathedral, which enabled the University of Durham, founded by the Dean and Chapter in 1832, to assert itself as the successor to Durham College.

== History ==
=== Establishment ===
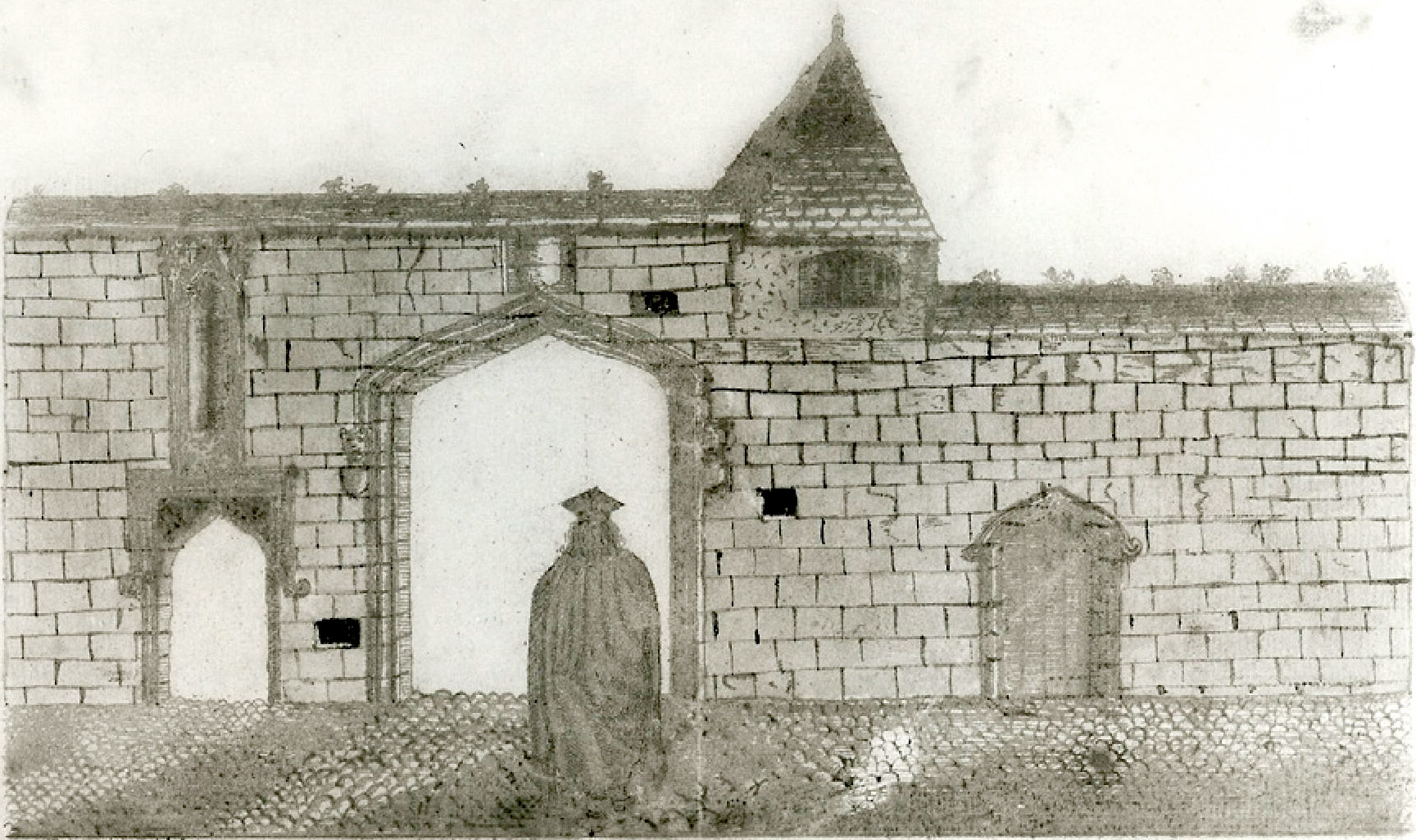
College gate (1397) onto Horsemonger Street, drawn by Francis Wise before its 1733 removal

Durham Hall was built to provide a place of learning for Benedictine monks from Durham Priory. While monks from Durham were sent to study in Oxford from at least 1278, there was no Benedictine establishment at the university. In 1291 the southern abbeys decided to combine their efforts at Gloucester College, but Durham had already begun to make its own arrangements.

A substantial site to the north of the city walls, opening onto Horsemonger Street (now Broad Street) and Beaumont (now Parks Road) was acquired in sections, beginning with 10 acres of land on Beaumont acquired from Godstow Abbey around 1286 by prior Hugh of Darlington. Further land was acquired and building commenced under Hugh's successor Richard de Hoton. The hall developed over the following decades, and it was one of the only establishments in Oxford (alongside Merton) to have constructed specialised collegiate buildings by 1300. By 1302, buildings included a two-storey residence, with a dormitory and a cellar, and an inventory of 1315 includes vestments and ornaments for celebrating mass, indicating that some sort of consecrated space had been arranged by that point. An oratory was constructed in 1323 and groundwork for a chapel shortly thereafter, though no such chapel was actually built.

The hall was a cell of Durham Priory, and the monks who lived there were monks of Durham, residing in Oxford at the discretion of the Prior of Durham. Monks would generally proceed to the house of studies in Oxford having already received instruction in grammar and arts at the priory in Durham (or sometimes at Stamford), where the level of scholarship was sufficient to allow Durham monks arriving at Oxford to proceed directly to the higher degrees of Bachelor and Doctor of Divinity. The hall was intended to house six to ten monks, but numbers were often lower - evidence given in a 1367 lawsuit suggested numbers in that decade varied between two and five, and on one occasion a prior had to send a companion to Oxford to comply with a prohibition on a monk living alone.

The hall was headed by a prior, who was appointed centrally as with other cells such as Finchale Priory. Initially the resident priors had little power, which caused some problems, such as in 1319 when the chancellor of the university claimed the right to dispose of vacant rooms in the hall on the basis that the 'principal' - the Prior of Durham - was non-resident. Subsequently the prior was given additional powers, and by the 1340s was empowered to administer the hall, collect rents and hear confessions, and had sufficient status in the university to be named as a member of the visitatorial board of Balliol College.

The hall assembled a small collection of books to cater for the needs of students - around 1325 it held 39 theological and philosophical volumes, while by the end of the century this had expanded to 115, including logic, medicine and miscellaneous works. Inscriptions in surviving volumes record that a wider range of books were acquired and exchanged by individual students.

=== Richard de Bury's attempted foundation ===
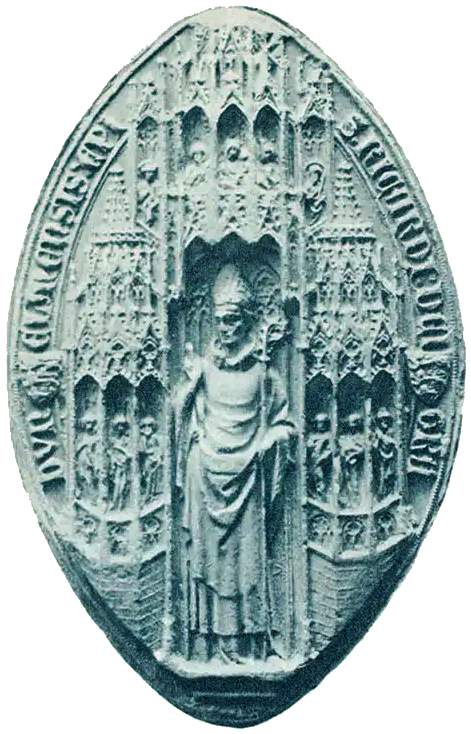
Seal of Richard de Bury

In 1338, Richard de Bury (or Aungerville), Bishop of Durham and noted bibliophile, attempted to secure the future of the establishment by persuading King Edward III to assign to it the proceeds of the profitable rectory of Simonburn. He also intended to establish it with new statutes dedicating it to God and St Margaret, and equip it with his famed library of over 1,500 volumes. In his 1345 book The Philobiblon, he described in detail his plans for the college library and its lending system.

Now we have long cherished in our heart of hearts the fixed resolve, when Providence should grant a favourable opportunity, to found in perpetual charity a Hall in the reverend university of Oxford, the chief nursing mother of all liberal arts, and to endow it with the necessary revenues, for the maintenance of a number of scholars; and moreover to enrich the Hall with the treasures of our books, that all and every of them should be in common as regards their use and study...

— Philobiblon, Richard de Bury, 1345 (trans. E C Thomas)

However, de Bury died later in 1345 with heavy debts, and the surviving college rolls suggest that no part of this plan took place. Simonburn was given instead to the Canons of St George's Chapel, Windsor Castle, while de Bury's books were sold to meet his debts. The college did not gain a library until 70 years after his death, after Bishop Hatfield's endowment.

=== Hatfield's endowment ===
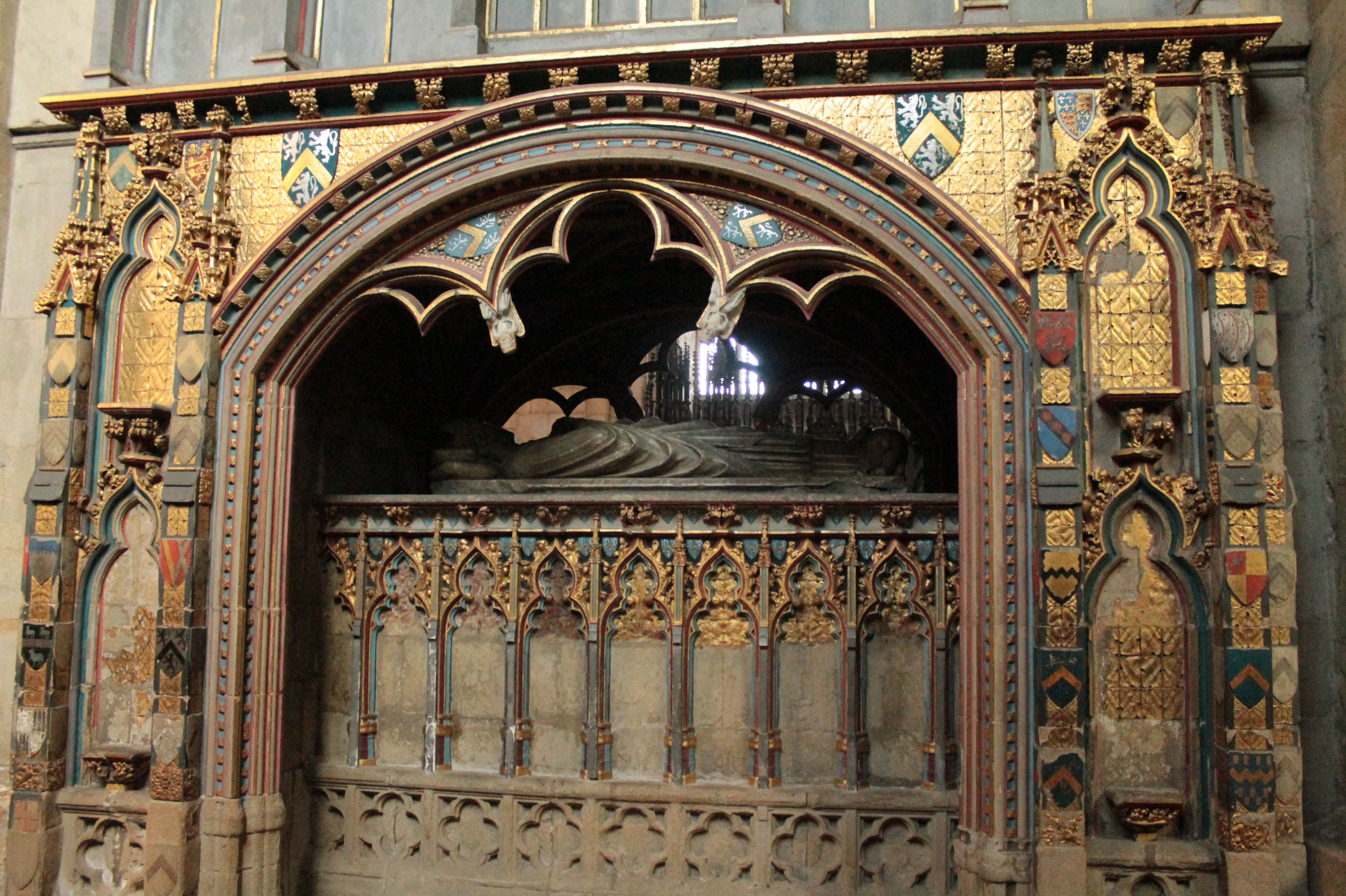
Tomb of Bishop Thomas Hatfield

In 1380, Thomas Hatfield, Richard de Bury's successor as Bishop of Durham, drew up a covenant to establish the college with a £3000 endowment (equivalent to £2,800,000 in 2025) to provide £200 annually (equivalent to £180,000 in 2025) for the maintenance of eight student monks (socii or fellows) and eight seculars (scholares or scholars). Execution of the scheme was delayed after Hatfield's death in 1381, but the funds were eventually delivered. The Prior of Durham, Robert de Berington of Walworth, placed a monk of Durham, John de Berington (probably his brother) in charge of the funds, and he used them – perhaps somewhat wastefully – to purchase a number of rectories – Frampton, Fishlake, Bossall and Ruddington – and estates, to provide income for the college.

The statutes drawn up stated that the fellows were to take instruction in philosophy and theology; they were also to oversee the selection of the scholars, four of whom were to be drawn from North Yorkshire and four from the Diocese of Durham. The eight scholars would learn philosophy and grammar, whilst being paid to assist the monks in day-to-day tasks. All students were expected to remain for seven or eight years to complete their instruction. The running of the college would be overseen by one of the fellows, who was to take the title of warden, and the Bishop of Durham was to be visitor.

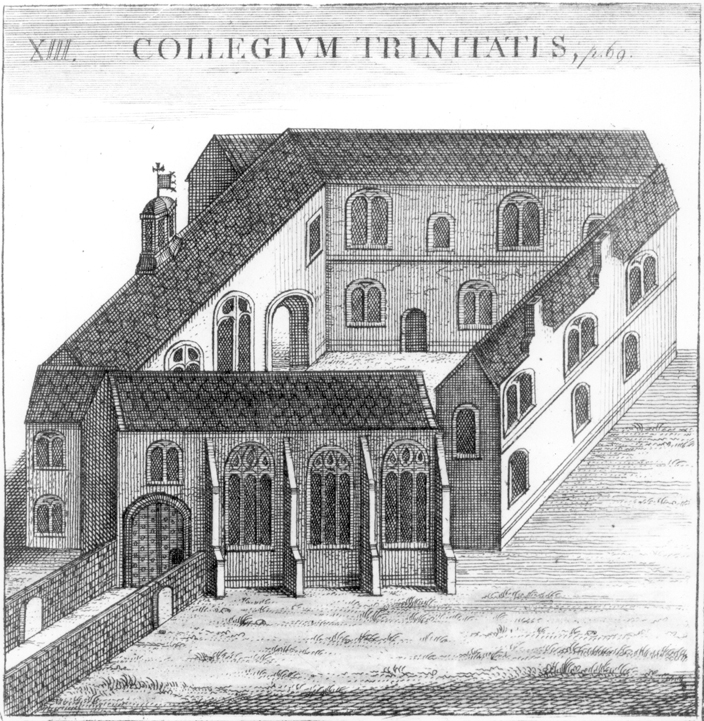
The college quadrangle c.1566, shortly after it was taken over by Trinity College

The funds proved sufficient for the laying out of college buildings over the following years. A new gate onto Horsemonger Street was constructed in 1397, opening onto a walled road leading to a quadrangle of new buildings, including living quarters, a refectory, a chapel (1408–9, with the aid of a bequest from Bishop Walter Skirlaw) and a library (1417–8). The chapel was licensed for interments by a bull of Pisan Pope John XIII in 1412. The quadrangle seems to have been completed in 1420-1, with only repairs listed in the accounts after that date.

There were occasional disputes over authority in the college, with the prior studentium of Gloucester College claiming (with some legal justification) authority over all Benedictine monks resident at the university, including those in Durham College and Canterbury College. Prior of Durham John Wessington, who had earlier been the college's bursar, wrote a treatise in 1422 arguing that the college's students should be exempt from this authority because the college predated the appointment of the prior.

The college seems to have acted as a home for students from other Northern Benedictine abbeys, including York and Whitby. Rooms also seem to have been rented to others who were not part of the foundation, including university chancellor Gilbert Kymer, whose acts during his second period as chancellor (1446–1453) were dated from Durham College.

"University monks" were influential in the governance of Durham Priory in its later years: six wardens of the college became priors of Durham, and many others held other important posts such as priors of Coldingham Priory and Finchale Priory.

=== Disestablishment ===
During the English Reformation the site was surrendered twice to the crown. The first time, in 1540, it was reported to have an annual income of £115 (equivalent to £92,000 in 2025). Around this time, the buildings on the site were inspected by a surveyor from the Court of Augmentations, providing valuable details about the buildings and the grounds, which were said to consist of three well-proportioned gardens.

The buildings of the college were regranted to the Dean of Durham, who kept it on in much the same form, with a rector, six fellows, and four 'inferior fellows'. George Clyff, the senior fellow of the college, was appointed as rector, but does not seem to have taken his responsibilities seriously, and the college did not survive.

In 1541, Henry VIII proposed founding a university in Durham using the funds of the college, but the plans were scaled down to a grammar school, with a headmaster and assistant master paid from Cathedral funds.

The college buildings were again surrendered to the crown in March 1544/5 and not regranted, while its estates reverted to the Dean and Chapter of Durham. The buildings were briefly occupied as a private hall by Walter Wright, Archdeacon of Oxford and later Vice-Chancellor of the university, but they then fell into disrepair, and are described colourfully by Anthony Wood as "canilia lustra" (dog kennels).

=== Trinity College ===
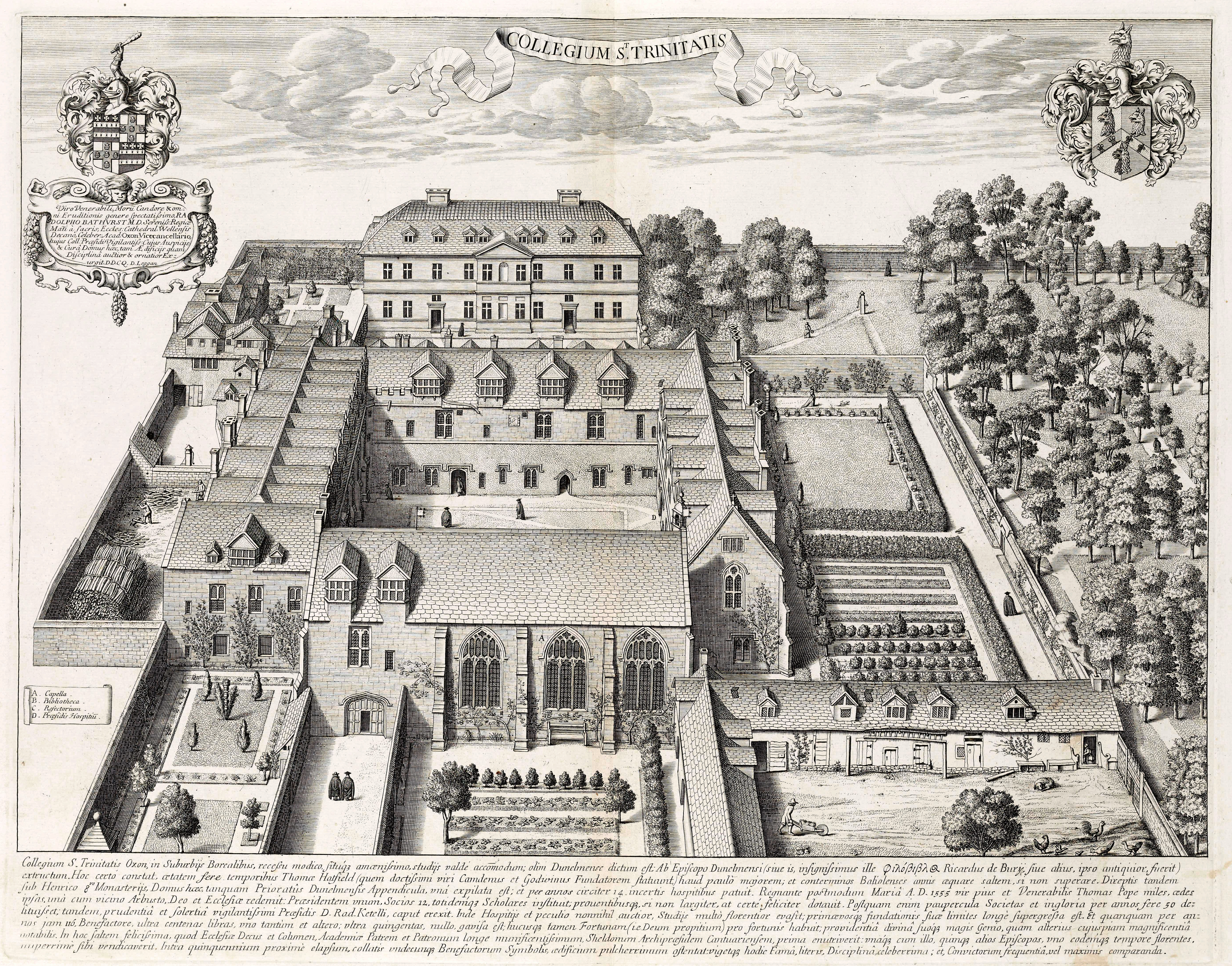
Trinity College in 1675, with Durham College's chapel and quadrangle largely intact alongside newer buildings

In 1546, half of the college's grove, having been leased to St Bernard's College, Oxford, for some time, was granted along with St Bernard's to Christ Church. The garden would eventually become part of the original site of St John's College, Oxford, upon its foundation in 1555.

In 1553, the buildings and the remaining grounds of Durham College were granted by King Edward VI to Dr George Owen of Godstow and William Martyn of Oxford, who sold them on 20 February 1554/5 to self-made politician Thomas Pope. 16 days later, Pope used them to found Trinity College. Durham College was originally dedicated to the Virgin Mary, St Cuthbert, and the Trinity, and it is thought that Trinity College took its name from the last element of this dedication.

== Legacy ==
=== Buildings ===
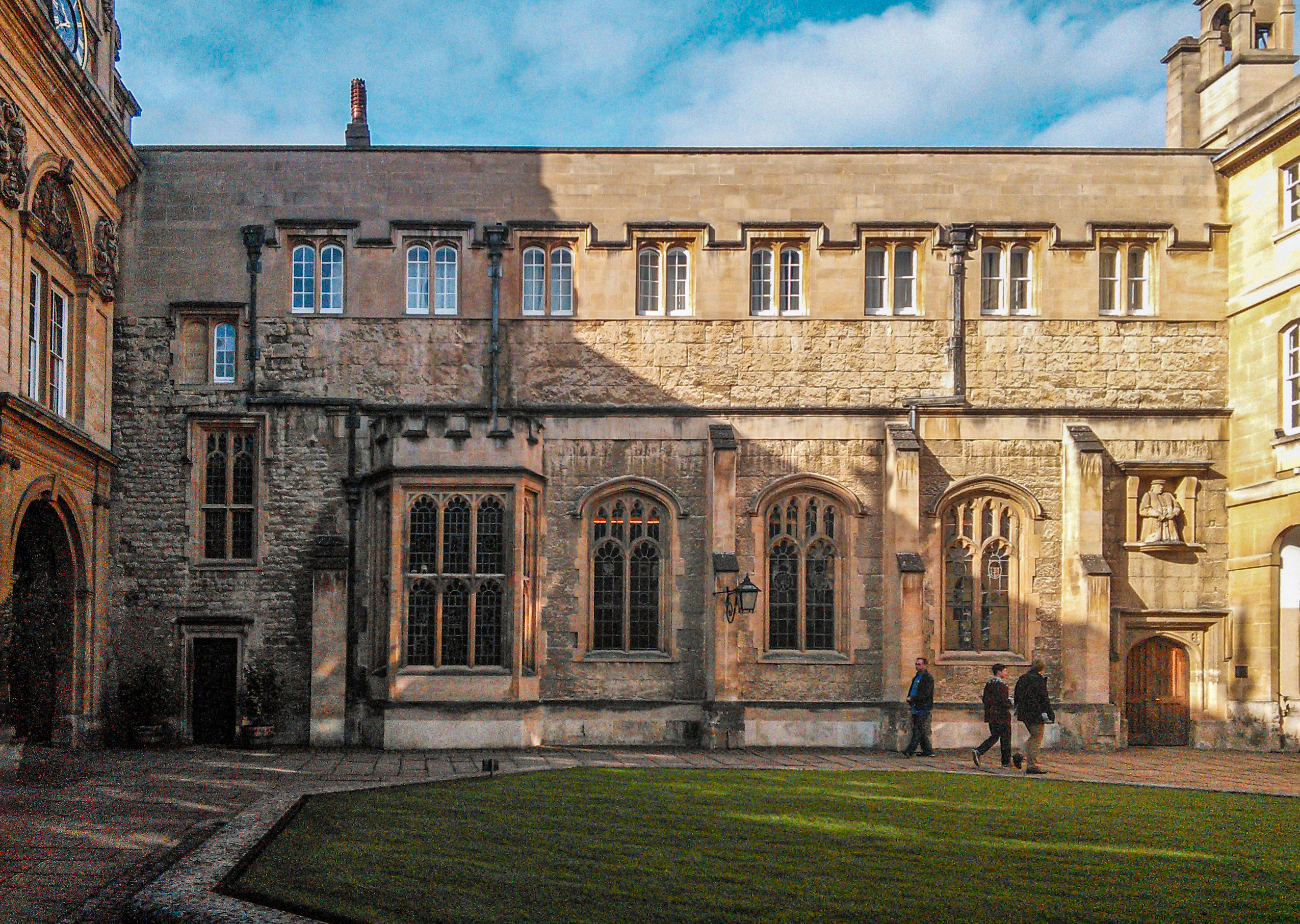
The west (hall) range of Trinity College's Durham quadrangle. The hall was rebuilt in 1618, but elements of Durham College's buildings remain at the north and south ends.

The college's name, and some of its buildings, are preserved in the Durham Quadrangle of Trinity College. The east range of the Durham College quadrangle largely survives, including the monastic library on the first floor. It features heraldic stained glass of Thomas Hatfield and of prior John Wessington which is believed to be original to the building, and some 15th-century stained glass figures of saints which may have been brought from the Durham College chapel on its demolition. "Cock-loft" attics with dormer windows were added in 1602 by Ralph Kettell.

The Durham College dining hall in the west range was retained until 1618, when it collapsed due to over-ambitious excavations under President Kettell and was rebuilt. However, elements of 14th century fabric still survive at either end of Kettell's hall, including the outer buttery, with some 15th and 16th century stained glass, and the south wall with a double arch which may be the oldest remaining fragment of Durham College.

The college chapel survived until 1692, when it is described as having become "very homely" and "infirm and ruinous", and was entirely demolished and replaced. Likewise the north range of the Durham College quadrangle was entirely replaced by William Townesend in 1728. The Durham College gate, with a large archway and a postern with an ornamented niche above, remained in place until 1733, when it was deemed "unfit for public use on account of its narrowness" and replaced with a metal fence and gates.

=== University of Durham ===
Arms of Durham University, including a canton of the arms of Durham College benefactor Thomas Hatfield

In the 19th century, the founders of the nascent University of Durham argued that the Dean and Chapter's possession of the estates of the former college – along with Henry VIII's and Oliver Cromwell's previous attempts to apply those estates to a university establishment in Durham – meant that they should be entitled to use those estates to fund the university. Charles Thorp, first Warden of Durham University, wrote:

The university is the legitimate successor of Durham College, the property of which remained since the reformation in the hands of the Chapter and which successive Governments from Henry VIII downwards have proposed to apply to academic education at Durham.

Early Durham University calendars contained a note setting out the link between the college and the university, (Note: "It is also a fact worthy of notice that the Dean and Chapter were endowed by Henry VIII, not only with the revenues of the Benedictine Priory at Durham, but also with those of the College connected with it in the University of Oxford. This College [...] was dissolved at the Reformation on account of its connexion with the Priory of Durham; and its advowsons and other endowments were granted by Henry VIII to the new Dean and Chapter. This body, therefore, is the representative of the ancient College, as well as of the ancient Priory: and thus there is a peculiar fitness in their endeavour to replace the suppressed establishment for education in Oxford by the foundation of a new one of a similar nature at Durham." - "Introduction", The Durham University Calendar (1842)) and the university's coat of arms includes on a canton that of Bishop Hatfield, who endowed Durham College.

== Heads of college ==
=== Priors ===
- Gilbert Elwyk, S.T.P., occurs 1316
- John de Beverlaco, S.T.P., occurs 1333
- R— de C—, (Note: Possibly Robert de Claxton, Prior of Coldingham; or Robert Crayk.) after 1340
- ? Uthred de Boldon, S.T.P., c.1360
- ? John Aclyff, or de Acley, c.1380
- Robert Blaklaw, c.1389–1404 (Note: Blaklaw took office shortly before the implementation of Hatfield's foundation, so retained the title of 'prior' for his term of office; after his time heads were called 'warden'.)

=== Wardens ===
- William Appylby, 1404–1409
- Thomas Rome, S.T.P., 1409–1419
- William Ebchester, S.T.P., 1419–1428
- Richard Barton, S.T.B., 1428–1431
- John Mody, S.T.P., 1431–c.1440
- John Burnby, S.T.P., 1442–1450
- Richard Bell, S.T.B., 1450–1453
- John Burnby, again, 1453–1456
- Thomas Caly, S.T.B., 1457–c.1463
- Robert Ebchester, S.T.P., c. 1464–c.1475
- William Law, S.T.B., c. 1478–c.1481
- John Aukland, S.T.P., c. 1481–1484
- Thomas Rowland, S.T.B., 1484–1487
- Thomas Castell, S.T.P., 1487–1494
- William Cawthorne, S.T.P., 1494–c.1501
- Thomas Swalwell, S.T.P., c.1501
- ? Thomas Castell, occurs 1511
- Hugh Whitehead, S.T.P., 1512–c.1519
- Edward Hyndmer alias Henmarsh, S.T.P., c.1527–1541

=== Rector ===
- George Clyff, S.T.B., 1541–1542

== Bibliography ==
- Blakiston, Herbert E. D. (1896), "Some Durham College Rolls", in Burrows, Montagu (ed.), Collectanea, vol. 3, Oxford: Oxford Historical Society, pp. 1–76
- Blakiston, Herbert E. D. (1898), Trinity College, London: F. E. Robinson
- Brown-Syed, Christopher (27 March 2004), "Book Review: The Love of Books, The Philobiblon of Richard de Bury", Library & Archival Security, 19 (1): 73–81, doi:10.1300/J114v19n01_12, S2CID 220387625
- Chance, Eleanor; Colvin, Christina; Cooper, Janet; Day, C J; Hassall, T G; Jessup, Mary; Selwyn, Nesta (1979), "Medieval Oxford", in Crossley, Alan; Elrington, C R (eds.), A History of the County of Oxford: Volume 4, the City of Oxford, London: Victoria County History, pp. 3–73
- de Bury, Richard (1345), "18 - Showeth that we have collected so great store of books for the common benefit of scholars and not only for our own pleasure", Philobiblon, a Treatise on the Love of Books, translated by Thomas, Ernest Chester
- Foster, Meryl R. (1990), "Durham Monks at Oxford c. 1286-1381: a House of Studies and its Inmates" (PDF), Oxoniensia, 55, Oxford: Oxfordshire Architectural and Historical Society: 199–114, ISSN 0308-5562
- Fowler, J. T. (1904), Durham university; earlier foundations and present colleges, F. E. Robinson & co.
- Hopkins, Clare (2005), Trinity: 450 years of an Oxford college community, Oxford: Oxford University Press, ISBN 978-0-19-951896-8
- Knowles, David (1979), The Religious Orders in England, vol. 2, Cambridge University Press, ISBN 9780521295673
- Page, William, ed. (1907), "Houses of Benedictine monks: Durham College, Oxford", A History of the County of Oxford, vol. 2, pp. 68–70 – via British History Online
- Salter, H. E.; Lobel, Mary D, eds. (1954), "Trinity College", A History of the County of Oxford: Volume 3, the University of Oxford, Victoria County History, pp. 238–251
- Vallance, Aymer (1913), Old Colleges Of Oxford : their architectural history illustrated and described, London: B T Batsford
- Woodward, John (1894), "The University of Durham", A Treatise on Ecclesiastical Heraldry, Edinburgh: W. & A. K. Johnston, p. 444
- Wood, Anthony (1666), Clark, Andrew (ed.), Survey of the Antiquities of the City of Oxford, Oxford Historical Society
