= Herbert Edward Douglas Blakiston =

English academic and cleric (1862–1942)

- Blakiston in 1933

Vice-Chancellor of the University of Oxford
- In office 1917–1920
- Preceded by: Thomas Banks Strong
- Succeeded by: Lewis Richard Farnell

President of Trinity College Oxford
- In office 1907–1938
- Preceded by: Henry Francis Pelham
- Succeeded by: John Weaver

Personal details
- Born: 5 September 1862 Hastings
- Died: 29 July 1942 (aged 79) Oxford
- Parents: Douglas Yeoman Blakiston, 1832-1914; Sophia Matilda Blakiston (Dent), 1826-1912
- Education: Trinity College, Oxford

Herbert Edward Douglas Blakiston (5 September 1862 – 29 July 1942) was an English academic and clergyman who served as president of Trinity College, Oxford, and as vice-chancellor of the University of Oxford.

== Family and early life ==
Herbert Blakiston was born in Hastings the son of artist Douglas Yeoman Blakiston and Sophia Matilda Dent. His father subsequently became a clergyman and the family moved to the vicarage of St Swithun's Church, East Grinstead. Blakistone was a descendant of Sir Matthew Blakiston, the Lord Mayor of London from 1760 to 1761; he was the great-grandson of Sir Matthew Blakiston, 2nd Baronet Blakiston.

Herbert Blakiston was the eldest of six children; he had two sisters and three brothers. All four brothers attended Tonbridge School, with Herbert being there from 1876 to 1881. As he wore glasses he acquired the nickname "Blinks" in school, which followed him for the remainder of his life.

Herbert's brother Charles was killed in a firearm accident at the age of 24 in October 1887. A house surgeon at the Salop Infirmary, Shrewsbury, Charles was accidentally shot in the back while hunting rabbits with a colleague. William, the youngest brother, was 19 when he accidentally fell under a train at Charing Cross Station on the night of 1 October 1889; he died in hospital some days later. The third brother John was a telegraph clerk. He was one of seven killed while defending Mazowe, Zimbabwe (then Rhodesia) on 18 June 1896 during the Second Matabele War.

In 1908 the vicarage at East Grinsted was destroyed in a fire, leaving Douglas Blakiston liable for £1000 as the building was under-insured. Herbert Blakiston's sisters, Mabel and Emily, died in 1910 and 1912. His mother also died in 1912, and his father died in 1914.

== Academic career ==
Blakiston matriculated at Trinity College, Oxford, in October 1881. He gained a first class degree in Literae Humaniores in 1885. He was ordained and became fellow, chaplain, and lecturer at Trinity College in 1887. He then became tutor in 1892, senior tutor and junior bursar in 1898.

In February 1907, the president of Trinity Henry Francis Pelham died suddenly in office. Blakiston was elected as his successor the following month. Blakiston was not the college fellows' first choice for the presidency. The vice-president Robert Raper was the preferred candidate. But Raper turned the position down, citing his advancing age as an obstacle. During his presidency, Blakiston continued in the role of chaplain and sometimes conducted services in the Trinity College chapel, he also served as the estates bursar of Trinity from 1915 to 1938.

Outside of Trinity College, Blakiston had also been appointed university proctor in 1899. He was the university auditor from 1903 to 1917 and became a member of the Hebdomadal Council in 1915.

During the First World War, many Trinity staff and students left to join the armed forces. By 1918, there were just nine undergraduates in residence. Blakiston became the university's Vice-Chancellor in 1917 and did much to improve its finances, which had been placed under strain by the war. During this time the university (in his words) was "almost empty". He was effective in this role although his health was affected by the strain of the additional responsibilities.

Blakiston was devoted to his college and its students. He had the lifelong habit of keeping clippings from The Times that mentioned any former student. He was badly affected by the deaths of 155 Trinity men during the First World War, many known to him personally. In many cases he personally visited the families of former-students who had been killed to offer condolences. After the war, he devoted much effort to a new library that was to be their memorial. He wrote 1200 letters asking for donations, partially designed the building himself and paid five percent of its cost from his own pocket. The library was eventually opened in 1928.

Blakiston was later described as unsociable, snobbish, parsimonious and obsessed with finance. He had few close friends and made enemies easily. His racism was notable even by the standards of the time and he became notorious for it. He was strongly against Oxford degrees being awarded to women, which began while he served as university vice-chancellor and in spite of all he could to do oppose it. The central character in Joanna Cannan's 1931 satirical novel High Table, Theodore Fletcher, is a thinly-disguised, cruel caricature of him.

During his presidency, Blakiston was largely responsible for college admissions and developed a particular notoriety for refusing applications to Trinity from non-white and mixed-race candidates. (Note: One such was Noël Agazarian who was explicitly turned down because of his Franco-Armenian parentage. Blakiston wrote to his school headmaster, stating that he could not be accepted as, "in 1911, when the last coloured gentleman had been at Trinity, it had really proved most unfortunate.".) Notably, he stubbornly resisted pressure from the India Office to admit undergraduates from British India, something that government department was attempting to promote. During this time, the traditional rivalry between Trinity and Balliol College took on a racial tone as Balliol admitted a number of Asian students. Although he was under no compulsion to retire from the College Presidency, he did so on 1 September 1938, having held the post for 31 years. He was succeeded by John Weaver.

== Later life ==
After living at Trinity College for 57 years, Blakiston moved to Boars Hill, near Oxford. On 28 July 1942, he was struck by a motorist while walking in Boars Hill; he died the next day in the Radcliffe Infirmary without regaining consciousness. His funeral took place in the Trinity College chapel and his ashes were interred in the antechapel. He left £100,055 in his will. His bequests were to Oxford University and Trinity College for the purchase of works of art.

Trinity College owns two portraits of him. One painted in 1932 by the chemist Cyril Norman Hinshelwood and one painted from a photograph in 1943 by Allan Gwynne-Jones.

== Works ==
Blakiston wrote articles for the Dictionary of National Biography, including the entry for the explorer Thomas Blakiston. In 1894, he wrote an English translation of several of Cicero's works, including the Catiline Orations and Pro Milone. He wrote a brief work on Durham College, Oxford and a meticulously-researched history of Trinity College that was published in 1898. A small print–run of his history of the Blakiston family was published in 1928. He also wrote a collection of ghost stories in Latin.

== See also ==
- History of Trinity College, Oxford
- Noel Agazarian

== Notes ==
Academic offices
Preceded by Henry Francis Pelham	President of Trinity College, Oxford; 1907–1938	Succeeded by John Weaver
Preceded by Thomas Banks Strong	Vice-Chancellor of Oxford University; 1917–1920	Succeeded by Lewis Richard Farnell
