= Ralph Kettell =

English college head

Ralph Kettell (1563–1643) was an English college head, the third President of Trinity College, Oxford. In a long tenure he built up the college both in terms of architecture and its academic reputation.

== Life ==
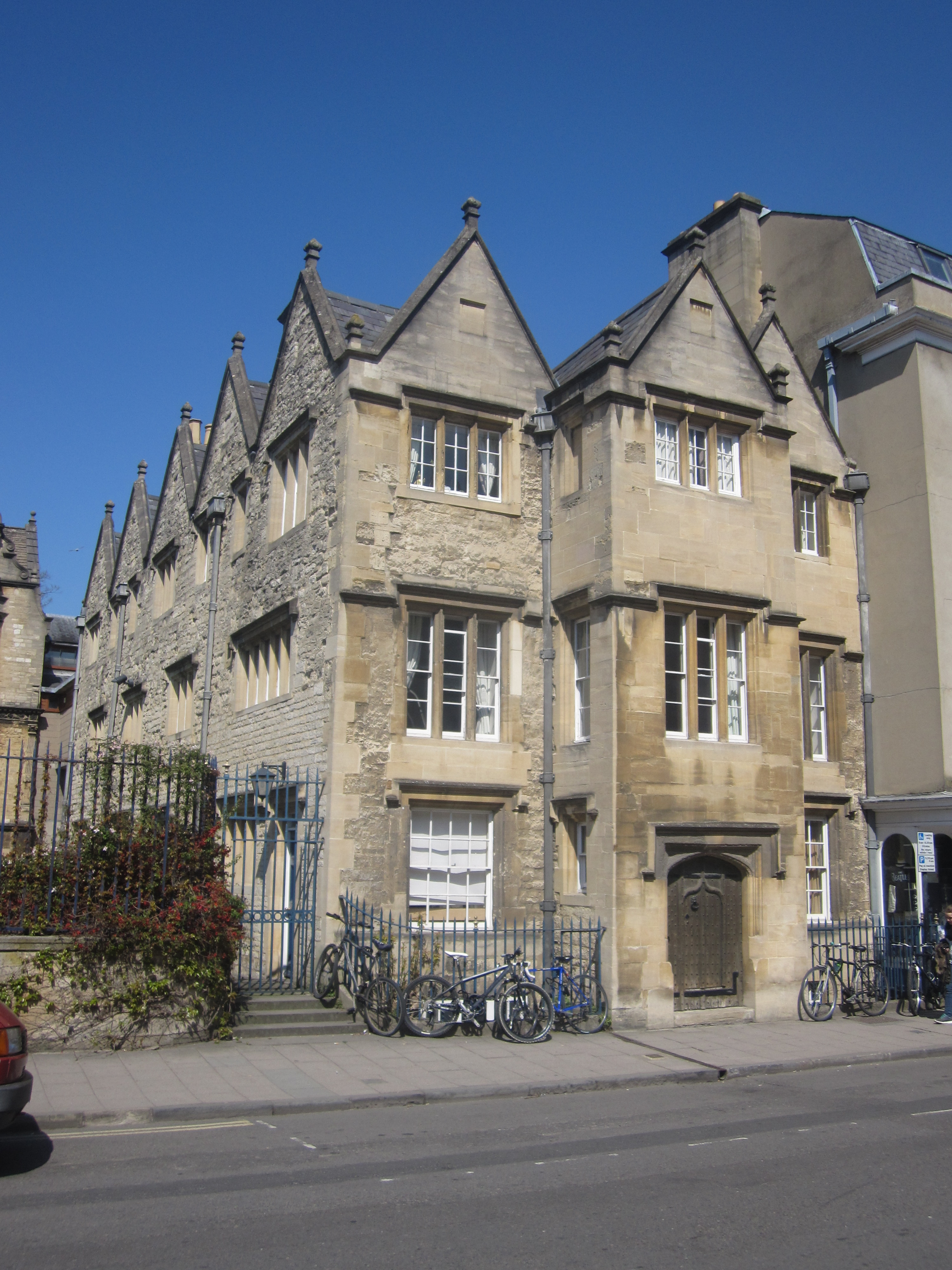
Kettell Hall, Oxford

He was the third son of John Kettell, gentleman, of King's Langley, Hertfordshire. He was nominated to a scholarship at Trinity in 1578 by Lady Elizabeth Paulet of Tittenhanger, the widow of Sir Thomas Pope, founder of the college. One of his contemporaries and friends at Trinity was Edward Hoby. Kettell was elected Fellow in 1583. He graduated B.A. 1582, M.A. 1586, B.D. 1594, and D.D. 1597, and, after filling various college offices, was elected president in 1599, on the death of Arthur Yeldard. Among those who as students were under his care while he was either tutor or president were the bishops Gilbert Sheldon, Henry Glenham, William Lucy, Gilbert Ironside, and Robert Skinner; also Sir John Denham, James Harrington, Edmund Ludlow, Henry Ireton, George Calvert, 1st Baron Baltimore and Cecilius Calvert, 2nd Baron Baltimore, William, Earl of Craven, and Sir Henry Blount. He rebuilt the college hall, and added attics or 'cocklofts ' to the old Durham College quadrangle, of which the east side still remains. About 1620 he built for the stone house in Broad Street which is still known as Kettell Hall, an investment of his own which later came to the college.

Kettell was one of the older heads of houses who disliked William Laud's high-handed reforms. He saved the old paintings in the college chapel from the puritan commissioner, William Fiennes, 1st Viscount Saye and Sele. Outside Oxford Kettell held the rectory of Garsington, which was attached to his office of president, and was private chaplain to Sir Francis Walsingham's widow and to Thomas Bilson, Bishop of Winchester. John Aubrey, who was admitted to Trinity in 1642, and knew Kettell in his old age, narrates many anecdotes.

Kettell died about 17 July 1643, and was buried at Garsington on 5 August. Aubrey states that "he had two wives, if not three, but no child", and that his second wife was the widow of Edward Villiers of Hothorpe Hall, Northamptonshire, whose daughter Elizabeth married George Bathurst and was the mother of Ralph Bathurst, president of Trinity College; but there are probably some inaccuracies here. His wife was buried at Garsington in 1624, and an infant daughter in 1606.

Academic offices
Preceded by Arthur Yeldard	President of Trinity College, Oxford; 1599–1643	Succeeded by Hannibal Potter
