= Richard de Hoton =

English priest (died 1308)

Richard de Hoton (died 9 January 1308) was prior of Durham after his election to that role on 24 March 1290. He is notable for his professional tensions with his bishop Antony Bek.

== Life ==
Richard de Hoton (probably of Hutton in North Yorkshire) was elected to the role of Prior of Durham on 24 March 1290, having previously served as Prior of Lytham.

He initiated building of Durham College, Oxford, the priory having acquired land for the purpose either early in his term of office, or late in that of his predecessor Hugh of Darlington.

He denied his bishop Antony Bek the right of episcopal visitation, launching appeals to York, Canterbury and Rome. Bek excommunicated Hoton for contumacy on 20 May 1300 and deprived him of his office the following day for disobedience, perjury and violation of monastic rule. King Edward I of England agreed a temporary reconciliation between Hoton and Bek on 20 June, though this was not to last and on 10 August Bek appointed the Prior of Lindisfarne, Henry of Lusby or Luceby, to replace Hoton. Ten days later Lusby forced his way into the monastery, forcibly removed Hoton from his stall and had him imprisoned. Lusby was formally installed on 24 August, but Hoton escaped from the prison on 16 December 1300.

On 1 March 1301 king Edward gave Hoton permission to spend two years at the papal court, and on 29 November that year Pope Boniface VIII declared that Lusby's appointment was uncanonical and that Hoton was to be reinstated. Lusby obeyed the pope, leaving Durham on 14 April 1302, with Hoton's proctor being put in possession of the monastery a week later. Hoton then arrived back in Durham on 1 August 1303, only to be suspended from office by the pope on 5 March 1306 and replaced as the monastery's administrator by Bek. Bek appointed Lusby to administer it as his proctor on 10 March, but the latter was expelled by the monks and Edward issued letters patent in April and June 1306 banning the pope's ejection of Hoton from taking place. Lusby died later in 1306 and Edward granted Hoton another year at the papal court (under royal protection) on 7 August that year. The pope then lifted Hoton's suspension and he was finally restored to his office on 1 December 1307, only to die at the papal court in 1308.

Catholic Church titles
Preceded by Hugh de Darlington	Prior of Durham; 1290–1300	Succeeded by Henry de Lusby
