= J. R. H. Weaver =

British historian (1882–1965)

John Reginald Homer Weaver (28 January 1882 – 22 March 1965) was a British historian, academic and architectural photographer. He was president of Trinity College, Oxford, from 1938 to 1954.

== Life and career ==
John Reginald Homer Weaver was born on 28 January 1882, the son of Reverend John Crowley Weaver, Vicar of Kempley, Gloucestershire. He was educated at Felsted School in Essex, and matriculated at the University of Oxford in 1905, as a member of Keble College. He obtained a first-class degree in history in 1909. During his time at the college, he was president of the Junior Common Room and the college debating society. He was Erasmus Smith's Professor of Modern History at Trinity College, Dublin from 1911 to 1914.

He then began a 40-year career at Trinity College, Oxford, first as a Fellow and Tutor from 1914 to 1938 (serving in the War Trade Intelligence Department between 1915 and 1919 during the First World War). In 1938, he was appointed President of Trinity College, a post he held until 1954.

One history of Trinity College, where he was commonly known as Reggie, describes him as a quiet and unassuming figure with an "easy-going attitude to College administration". He was also known at Oxford for his twin passions of architectural photography and roses. He created a rose garden at Trinity, between the War Memorial Library and the Jackson Building, and he made a number of trips to Spain to photograph ecclesiastical buildings.

He was editor of the Dictionary of National Biography (DNB) between 1928 and 1937. He was made an Honorary Fellow of Trinity College Dublin and Keble College. His writings included a memoir of Henry William Carless Davis, the historian and DNB editor, and an edition of The Chronicle of John of Worcester, 1118–1140 (1908).

== The Weaver Report ==
Weaver made a significant contribution to the highly contentious debate over the cleaning, conservation and restoration of oil paintings. The controversy began in the 19th century but found renewed energy in the late 1940s following the National Gallery's cleaning of some 60 paintings while in secret secure storage in Wales during the Second World War.

Following scathing criticism of some of the results, the then director of the National Gallery, Sir Philip Hendy, appointed Weaver to head a committee of inquiry into the gallery's cleaning and care of pictures in order to evaluate the safety and effectiveness of the techniques and materials then being used. A report, known as "The Weaver Report on the Cleaning of Pictures in the National Gallery", was published in 1950 and subsequently became widely known simply as The Weaver Report. It exonerated the gallery and endorsed what the gallery was keen to portray as the scientific approach applied in its conservation work (as opposed to one dominated by questions of aesthetics and taste).

The Weaver Report was, however, by no means the last word on the subject, and the argument continued well into the 1960s.

== Architectural photography ==
Weaver was an accomplished photographer, an interest he developed early in life, around 1900. He was a fellow of the Royal Photographic Society and had a particular interest in Spanish architecture. He spent several vacations travelling in Spain and photographing ecclesiastical buildings.

A collection of his work, dating from around 1900 to 1929 and comprising photographic prints, negatives, lantern slides, lecture notes and notebooks, is now held in the archive of Historic England. The subjects include Canterbury, Ely, Winchester, Gloucester and Lincoln cathedrals; Southwell Minster and York Minster; St Mary's Church at Kempley; St Mary's Church at Hartwell, Buckinghamshire; and in Oxford the Divinity School, Wadham College, Trinity College, the Old Ashmolean Museum and the Sheldonian Theatre.

More than a hundred of his photographs are held in the collection of the Victoria & Albert Museum in London. The gallery label for one of the images, of Avila Cathedral in Spain, states: "Weaver photographed architectural structures throughout Spain. A follower of Frederick Evans, he was interested in the delicate effects of light and shadow seen in interiors. He diligently recorded the conditions for each of the images he made and kept a detailed journal of his techniques...He captured the luminosity and detail of interiors by continuing to use platinum prints which had been popular in the 1890s."

An exhibition of Weaver's architectural photography, Photographs of Spanish Architecture, took place at the Royal Photographic Society from 4 June to 31 July 1943, and at the Institute of Spain in London from 27 June to 9 July 1949. Catalogues of these exhibitions are held in the National Art Library at the V&A Museum in London.

Photographs by him can also be found in the collections of the Harry Ransom Center, University of Texas, and the George Eastman Museum in Rochester, New York, as well as the Courtauld Institute of Art's Conway Collection.

== Personal life and death ==
John Weaver married Stella Mary Georgina Acton in 1917. They had one child, the distinguished surgeon John Patrick Acton Weaver (1927–2011). John Weaver died on 22 March 1965.

== Selected publications ==
- The Dictionary of National Biography, 1912–1921: with an index covering the years 1901–1921 in one alphabetical series, Oxford University Press, 1927 (with H. W. Carless Davis and George Smith)
- The Dictionary of National Biography, 1922–1930: with an index covering the years 1901−1930 in one alphabetical series, Oxford University Press, 1937
- The Chronicle of John of Worcester, 1118–1140: being the continuation of the 'Chronicon ex chronicis' of Florence of Worcester, Clarendon Press, 1908
- Genealogical Tables Illustrative of Modern History, Clarendon Press, 1916 (with H. B. George)
- Some Oxfordshire Wills, proved in the Prerogative Court of Canterbury, 1393–1510, Oxfordshire Record Society, 1958 (with Alice Beardwood)
- Henry William Carless Davis, 1874–1928; a memoir, Constable and Co., 1933 (with Austin Lane Poole)
- Notas sobre la arquitectura románica inglesa, especialmente los rasgos que más la asemejan o distinguen del románico español (Notes on English Romanesque architecture, especially the features that most resemble or distinguish it from Spanish Romanesque), Maestre, 1953

Academic offices
Preceded by Herbert Edward Douglas Blakiston	President of Trinity College, Oxford; 1938-1954	Succeeded by Arthur Lionel Pugh Norrington
