= Thomas Hatfield =

14th-century Bishop of Durham

- Bishop of Durham
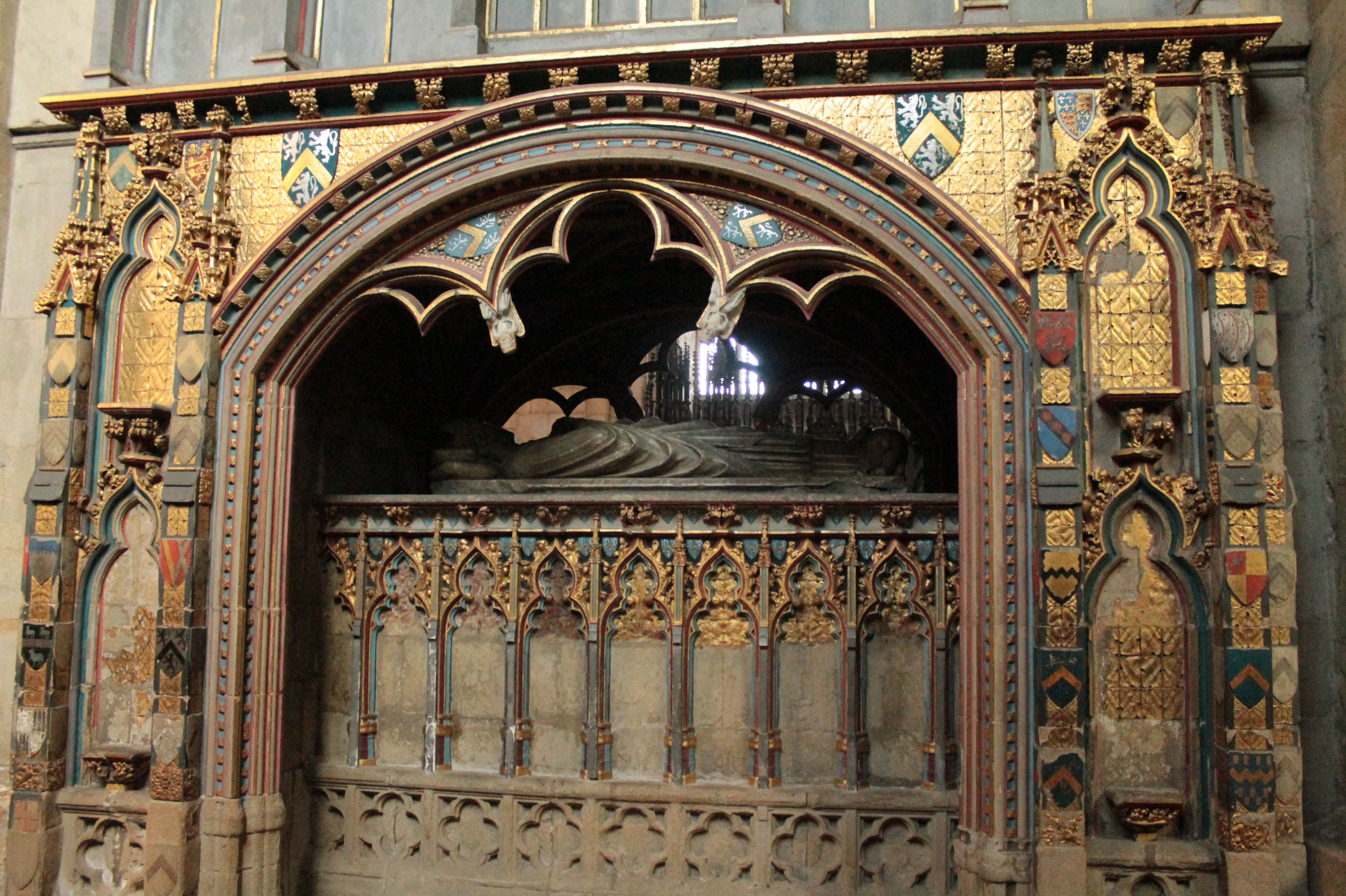
- Hatfield's elaborate tomb in Durham Cathedral
- Elected: 8 May 1345
- Term ended: 8 May 1381
- Predecessor: Richard Aungerville
- Successor: John Fordham
- Previous post: Lord Privy Seal

Orders
- Consecration: 7 August 1345

Personal details
- Died: 8 May 1381
- Denomination: Catholic
- Coat of arms

Thomas Hatfield or Thomas de Hatfield (died 1381) was Bishop of Durham from 1345 to 1381 under King Edward III. He was one of the last warrior-bishops in England.

He was born around 1310, presumably in one of the several British towns named Hatfield. He entered the employment of the king (Edward III) on 26 October 1337.

Hatfield was Receiver of the Chamber when he was selected to be Lord Privy Seal in late 1344. He relinquished that office to his successor in July 1345.

Hatfield was elected on 8 May 1345 in succession to Richard de Bury, and was consecrated on 7 August 1345.

Thomas fought in King Edward's division at the Battle of Crécy on 26 August 1346.

In 1380, he drew up a covenant to leave £3000 (equivalent to £2,800,000 in 2025) to endow Durham College, Oxford, which was the primary endowment of the college and enabled the construction of its quadrangle, chapel and surviving library, now part of the Durham Quadrangle of Trinity College, Oxford.

He died on 8 May 1381.

He is buried near the choir stalls in Durham Cathedral beneath the Bishop's Chair.

Due to his endowment of Durham College, Hatfield's arms appear in the canton of the arms of the University of Durham. Hatfield College, a constituent college of the university, is named after him.

== Citations ==
Political offices
Preceded by John de Ufford	Lord Privy Seal; 1344–1345	Succeeded by John Thoresby
Catholic Church titles
Preceded by Richard Aungerville	Bishop of Durham; 1345–1381	Succeeded by John Fordham
