= Thomas Slythurst =

English academic and Roman Catholic priest

Thomas Slythurst (died 1560) was an English academic and Roman Catholic priest. He was the first President of Trinity College, Oxford. He lost his positions in 1559, on the accession of Elizabeth I, by his refusal to take the Oath of Supremacy. It has been said that he died in the Tower of London, but this is contested.

== Life ==
Slythurst was born in Berkshire. He was B.A. Oxon, 1530; M.A., 1534; B.D., 1543; and supplicated for the degree of D.D., 1554-5, but never took it. He was rector of Chalfont St. Peter, Buckinghamshire, from 1545 to 1555, canon of Windsor 1554, rector of Chalfont St. Giles, Bucks, 1555. He was deprived of these three preferments in 1559.

On 11 November 1556, he was appointed with others by Convocation to regulate the exercises in theology on the election of Cardinal Reginald Pole to the chancellorship.

== Notes ==
Academic offices
Preceded by initial President	President of Trinity College, Oxford; 1556–1559	Succeeded by Arthur Yeldard
