= Hugh Whitehead =

English religious leader (died 1551)

Hugh Whitehead (died 1551) was the last prior of the Benedictine monastery at Durham in England. The monastery was dissolved by King Henry VIII in 1540. Whitehead would go on to become the cathedral's first dean.

== Life ==
He was from a County Durham family. Ordained priest in 1501, he then studied for seven years at Durham College, Oxford. From 1512-c.1519, he was warden of Durham College.

Whitehead was from 1519 to 1540 last prior, and from 1541 first dean of Durham. He was later implicated in the fictitious charges of treason brought against his bishop Cuthbert Tunstall, in 1550–1, and was imprisoned in the Tower of London. There he died in November 1551.

Catholic Church titles
Preceded by Thomas Castell	Prior of Durham; 1520–1540	Succeeded by position abolished
Church of England titles
Preceded by position created	Dean of Durham; 1540–1551	Succeeded by Robert Horne
