= Prior of Durham =

Head of Durham cathedral-priory

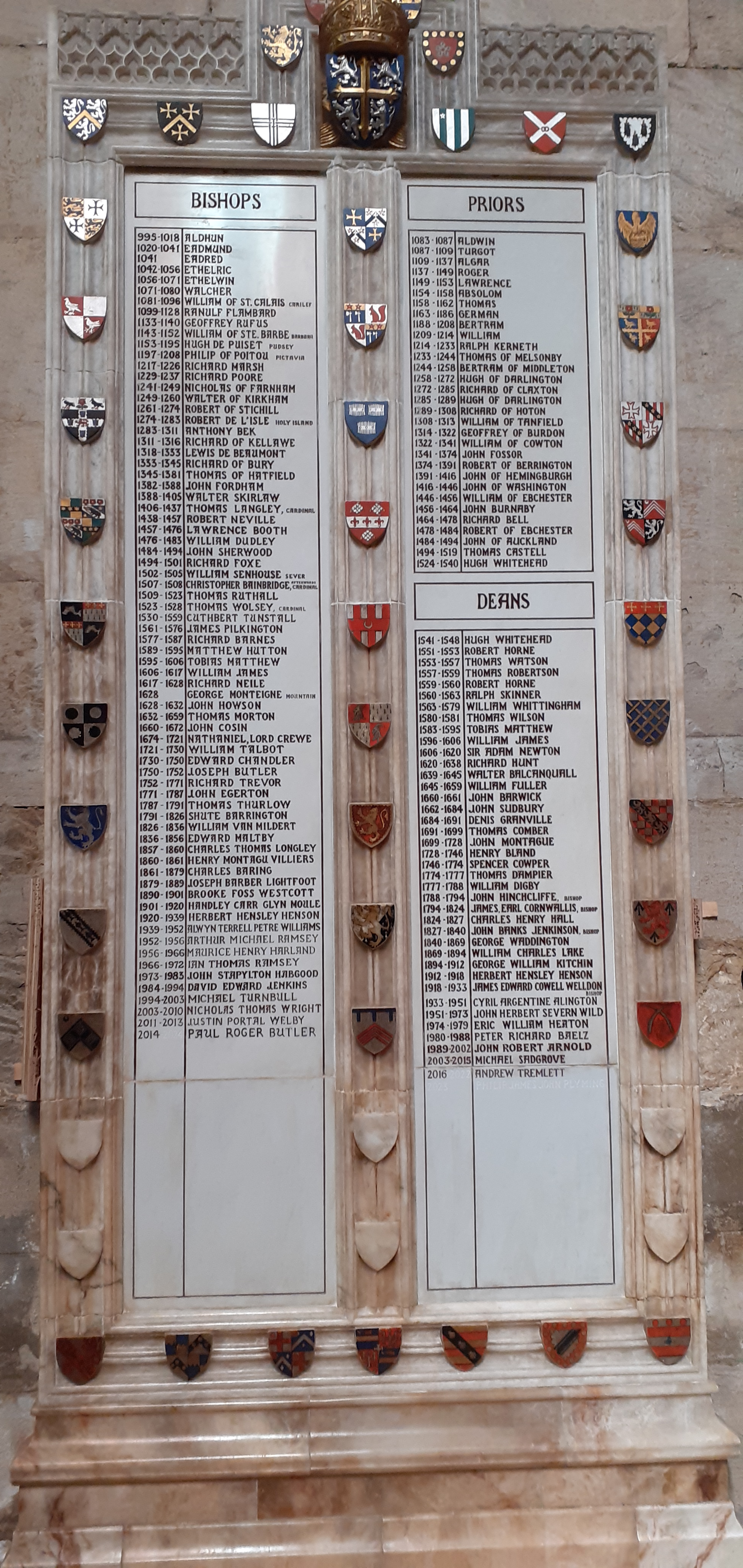
A list of the Bishops, Priors and Deans of Durham as seen on the wall of St. Cuthbert's shrine in Durham Cathedral.

The Prior of Durham was the head of the Roman Catholic Durham Cathedral Priory, founded c. 1083 with the move of a previous house from Jarrow. The succession continued until dissolution of the monastery in 1540, when the priory was replaced with a Church of England deanery church.

After the Benedictine monastery was dissolved, the last Prior of Durham, Hugh Whitehead, became the first Dean of Durham, heading the cathedral's secular chapter.

== List ==
Priors of St Cuthbert's Cathedral Priory, Durham
From	Until	Incumbent	Citation(s)	Notes
1083	died 1087	Aldwin		Prior of Jarrow from 1073x4 before the priory's move to Durham
1087	resigned 1109	Turgot		Became Bishop of St Andrews
1109	died 1137 x 1138	Algar		
?1138	died 1149	Roger		
1149	died 1154	Lawrence		
1154	died 1158	Absalom		
1161 x 1162	resigned 1162 or 1163	Thomas		Died 1173
1163	died 1189	Germanus		
1189	died 1212 x 1213	Bertram		
1212 x 1213	died 1218	William		
1218	died 1234	Ranulf Kerneth		
1234	died 1244	Thomas de Melsonby		
1244	resigned 1258	Bertram de Middleton		Still alive in 1266
1258	resigned 1273	Hugh de Darlington		
1273	resigned 1285	Richard de Claxton		
1286	resigned 1290	Hugh de Darlington (again)		
elected 1290		Richard de Hoton		Deprived of office 1300, replaced with Henry de Lusby; restored 1302; suspended and replaced by Lusby again 1306; restored 1307; died 1308.
appointed 1300		Henry de Lusby		Prior of Lindisfarne, appointed to Durham 1300-1302 and briefly in 1306. Died 1306.
1308	resigned 1313	William de Tanfield		Died 7 February 1314
1313	resigned 1321	Geoffrey de Burdon		Still alive in 1333; previously prior of Finchale and prior of Lyytham
elected 1321		William de Guisborough		Elected 6 February, renounced election 8 February 1321
1321	died 1341	William de Cowton		
1341	died 1374	John Fossor		
1374	died 1391	Robert Berrington of Walworth		
1391	died 1416	John de Hemingbrough		
1416	died 1446	John de Washington		
1446	resigned 1456	William Ebchester		
1456	died 1464	John Burnby		
1464	resigned 1479	Richard Bell		
1479	died 1484	Robert Ebchester		
1484	died 1494	John Auckland		
1494	1519	Thomas Castell		
1520	office abolished 1540	Hugh Whitehead		Surrendered the monastery to the king in 1540, and reappointed as first Dean of Durham with a chapter of twelve canons. Died 1551.
