= Thomas Pope =

English public servant (c. 1507 – 1559)

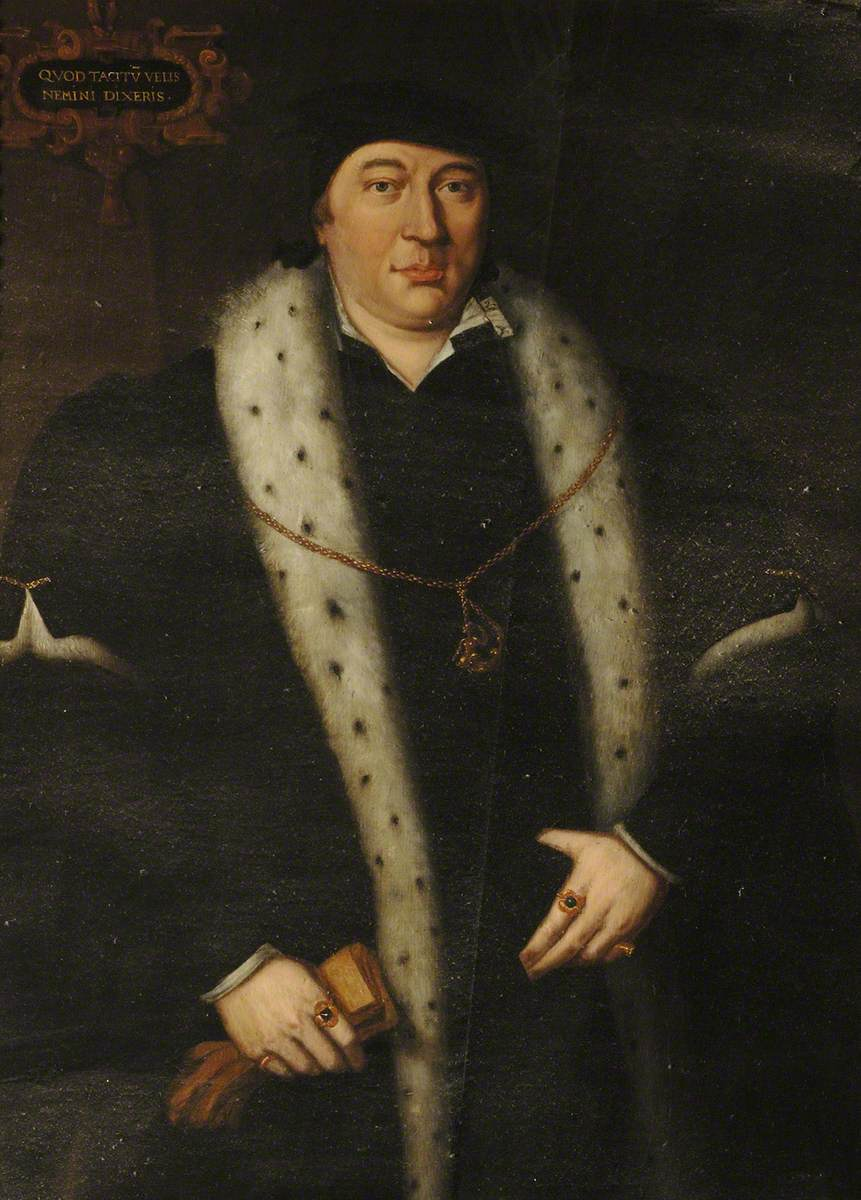
- Born: c. 1507
- Died: 29 January 1559; Clerkenwell
- Position held: Member of the 1536 Parliament, Member of the 1539-40 Parliament

Sir Thomas Pope (c.1507 – 29 January 1559) was a prominent public servant in mid-16th-century England, a Member of Parliament, a wealthy landowner, and the founder of Trinity College, Oxford.

== Early life ==
Pope was born at Deddington, near Banbury, Oxfordshire, probably in 1507, as he was about sixteen years old when his father, a yeoman farmer, died in 1523. He was educated at Banbury School and Eton College, and entered the Court of Chancery. He there found a friend and patron in the Lord Chancellor, Thomas Audley. As clerk of briefs in the Star Chamber, Warden of the Mint (1534–1536), Clerk of the Crown in Chancery (1537), and second officer and Treasurer of the Court of Augmentations for the settlement of the confiscated property of the smaller religious foundations, he obtained immense wealth and influence. In this last office he was superseded in 1541, but from 1547 to 1553 he was again employed as fourth officer. He himself won by grant or purchase a considerable share in the spoils, for nearly 30 manors, which came sooner or later into his possession, were originally church property. According to John Aubrey, "He could have rode in his owne lands from Cogges (by Witney) to Banbury, about 18 miles." He established his country seat at Tittenhanger, Hertfordshire.

== Parliament ==
He was Member of Parliament for Buckingham in 1536 and for Berkshire in 1539. In 1537 he was knighted. He was High Sheriff of Essex and Hertfordshire for 1552 and 1557. The religious changes made by Edward VI were not to his liking, but at the beginning of Mary I's reign he became a member of the privy council. In 1556, he was sent to reside as guardian in Elizabeth I's house.

== Trinity College ==
As early as 1555, he had begun to arrange for the endowment of a college at Oxford, for which he bought the site and buildings of Durham College, the Oxford house of the abbey of Durham, from George Owen and William Martyn. He received a royal charter for the establishment and endowment of a college of the "Holy and Undivided Trinity" (now known simply as Trinity College) on 8 March 1556.

The foundation provided for a president, twelve fellows and eight scholars, with a schoolhouse at Hook Norton. The number of scholars was subsequently increased to twelve, the schoolhouse being given up. On 28 March 1556, the members of the college were put in possession of the site, and they were formally admitted on 29 May 1556.

== Death ==
Pope died at Clerkenwell on 29 January 1559, and was buried at St Stephen's, Walbrook; but his remains were subsequently removed to Trinity College, where his widow erected a semi-Gothic alabaster monument to his memory.

== Personal life ==
Pope was married three times, to Elizabeth Gunston, Margaret (Townsend) and Elizabeth (Blount), but left no children. Much of his property was left to charitable and religious foundations, and the bulk of his Oxfordshire estates passed to the family of his brother, John Pope of Wroxton, and his descendants, the viscounts Dillon and the earls of Guilford and barons North.

Preceded by ?	Custos Rotulorum of Surrey bef. 1544–1559	Succeeded by The Lord Howard of Effingham
