= Robert de Graystanes =

English chronicler

Robert de Graystanes (d. 1336?), also known as Robert Greystones or Robert Graystanes, was a 14th-century English Benedictine monk, an unsuccessful candidate to become bishop of Durham around 1333, and supposed chronicler of the church of Durham.

== Life ==
Robert de Graystanes may have been born at Greystanes, three miles south-west of Sheffield. He described himself as Doctor Theologicus.

He had been sub-prior of St. Mary's for twenty-six years or more when Louis de Beaumont, bishop of Durham, died on 24 September 1333. On 15 October he was elected to the vacant see, after the permission of King Edward III had been obtained. William Melton, the archbishop of York, promised to confirm the election; but in the meanwhile (31 October) Robert, who had visited the king at "Lutogersale" (Ludgershall in Wiltshire or Buckinghamshire?), had been told that Pope John XXII had given the see "by provision" to Richard de Bury, "the king's clerk". The archbishop, however, after consulting his canons and lawyers, consecrated Robert (Sunday, 14 November), with the assistance of John Kirkby, Bishop of Carlisle and (allegedly) the Bishop of Armagh. The new bishop was installed at Durham on 18 November, and then, returning to the king to claim the temporalities of his see, was refused an audience and referred to the next parliament for an answer. Meanwhile, (14 October), the temporalities had been granted to Richard de Bury, who, having the archbishop now on his side, received the oath of the Durham clergy (10 January 1334). Robert, knowing that his convent was too poor to oppose the king and the pope, refused to continue the struggle.

He seems to have resumed his old office, and to have died about 1336. Robert Surtees says that he "survived his resignation scarcely a year", and died of disappointment. Richard de Bury, upon hearing of his death, apologised for the grief he showed by declaring that Graystanes was better fitted to be pope than he was to hold the least office in the church. Graystanes was buried in the chapter-house. William Hutchinson recorded his epitaph:

De Graystanes natus jacet hic Robertus humatus,
Legibus armatus, rogo sit Sanctis sociatus.

== Works ==
Graystanes supposedly continued the history of the church of Durham, which had been begun by Simeon of Durham, an anonymous continuator, and Geoffrey de Coldingham. He takes up Coldingham's narrative with the election of King John's brother Morgan (1213), and carries it down to his own resignation. According to Henry Wharton, however, he copied his history as far as 1285 (1283?) from the manuscript now called Cotton MS Julius D. 4. His work is of considerable value, especially as it nears the writer's own time. The "Historiae Dunelmensis Scriptores Tres" – including Coldingham, Graystanes, and William de Chambre – was first printed with excisions by Wharton in 1691. The best edition is that edited by James Raine for the Surtees Society in 1839. The chief manuscripts are (1) that in York Minster Library (MS xvi.I.12), which belongs to the 14th century; (2) Bodleian MS Laud 700 (which Hardy assigns to the same century), and Cotton MS Titus A. 2. John Leland reported another manuscript in the Carmelite Library at Oxford. Wharton followed the Cotton and Laud MSS.

== Bibliography ==
- Planta, Joseph (1802). Catalogue of the Manuscripts in the Cottonian Library, deposited in the British Museum. London: British Museum.
- Raine, James, ed. (1839). Historia Dunelmensis Scriptores Tres. Surtees Society. Vol. 9. London.
- Tanner, Thomas (1748). Bibliotheca Britannico-Hibernica. London.
- Wharton, Henry, ed. (1691). Anglia Sacra, sive Collectio Historiarum. London.

This article incorporates text from a publication now in the public domain: "Graystanes, Robert de". Dictionary of National Biography. London: Smith, Elder & Co. 1885–1900.
