= Mainsforth =

Village in County Durham, England

Coordinates: 54°40′38″N 1°30′47″W

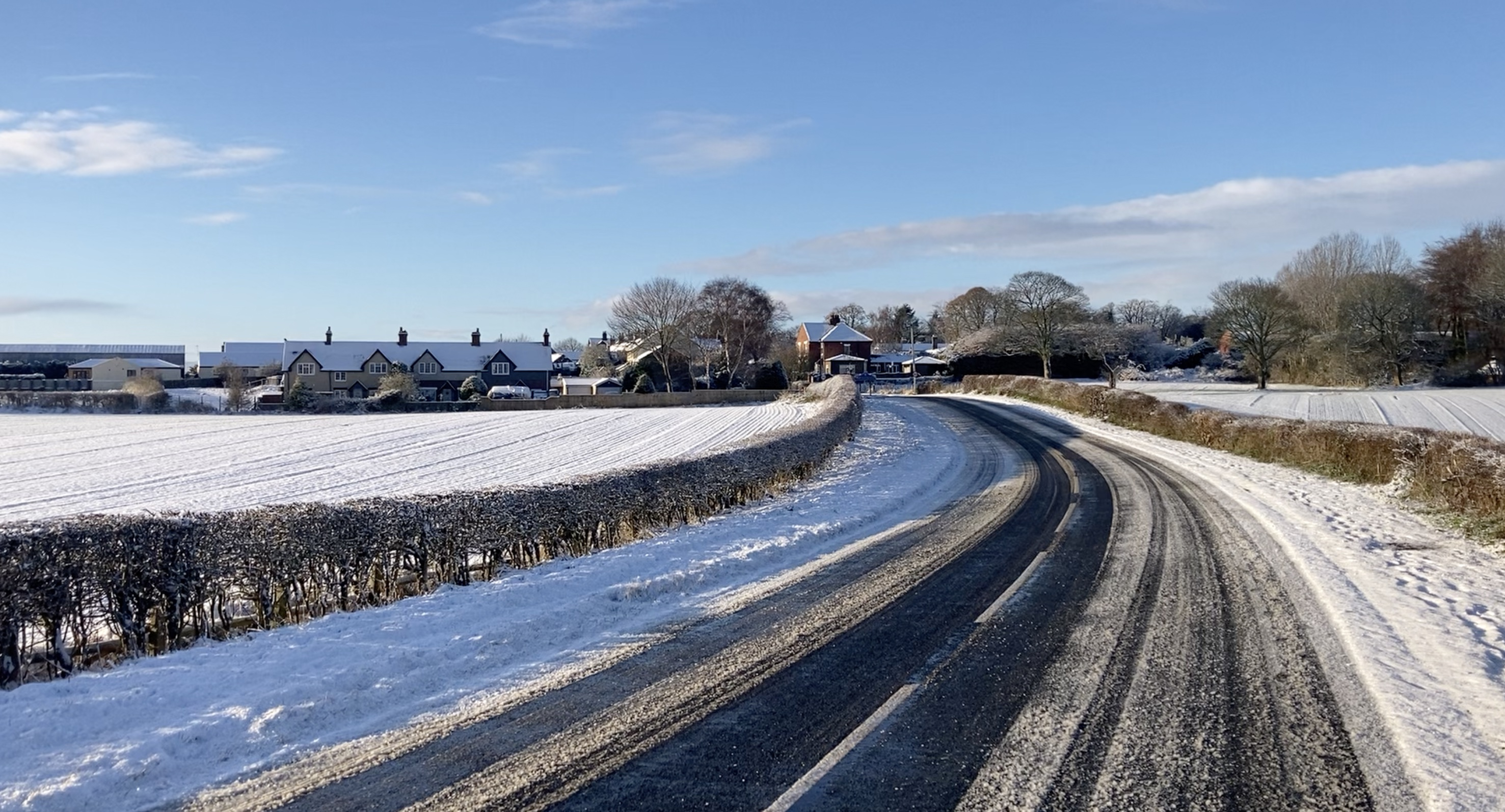
- Mainsforth

- Location within County Durham
- Civil parish: Bishop Middleham
- Unitary authority: County Durham
- Ceremonial county: Durham
- Region: North East
- Country: England
- Sovereign state: United Kingdom

Mainsforth is a small village and former civil parish, now in the parish of Bishop Middleham, in the County Durham district, in the ceremonial county of Durham, England. It is to the east of Ferryhill. The earliest settlement in Mainsforth may have been on Marble (Narble Hill). It has been suggested, without great historical foundation, that this was a Danish settlement. In 1961 the parish had a population of 229. From medieval times through to the early twentieth century the village was in effect a small collection of farms and farm workers' cottages.

Mainsforth Hall was a significant building in the centre of this small village, until its demolition in the 1960s. The hall was for many years the dwelling of the Surtees family. A notable member of the family was Robert Surtees (1779–1834), a County Durham historian.

Mainsforth Colliery, active from 1872-1968, lay between the village and Ferryhill Station.

== Etymology ==
The name Mainsforth is of Old English origin. The second element is ford. The first is unknown, but may be one of the personal-names Maino or Maegen.

== Civil parish ==
Mainsforth was formerly a township in the parish of Bishop-Middleham, from 1866 Mainsforth was a civil parish in its own right, on 1 April 1983 the parish was abolished and merged with Bishop Middleham and Ferryhill.
