= Geoffrey of Coldingham =

12th-century English monk and chronicler

Geoffrey of Coldingham was a late 12th and early 13th-century monk and chronicler.

Geoffrey is noted as the sacrist of Coldingham Priory in Berwickshire on three 14th-century manuscripts of his chronicle. This work, which began with the death of William of St. Barbara in 1152, covered the history of Durham Cathedral until 1215, when Morgan's election to Durham was quashed. The work was a continuation of Symeon of Durham's Historiae Dunelmensis, and Geoffrey's continuation in turn was continued down to 1336 by Robert of Greystanes. Greystanes work was later continued by William de Chambre through the year 1539.

There were four different Geoffreys who became members of the Durham cathedral chapter in the correct time frame, and one of these was the chronicler, as Coldingham was a dependent priory of Durham. Besides the chronicle, it is possible that Geoffrey was the author of two hagiographies about Bartholomew of Farne and Godric of Finchale, which were composed in the late 12th century.

The chronicle and its various continuations have been published by James Raine and the Surtees Society as Historiae Dunelmensis Scriptores Tres, Gaufridus de Coldingham, Robertus de Graystanes et Willielmus de Chambre in 1839.

Geoffrey died probably around 1215, as his chronicle ends abruptly about that time.
