= James Raine =

James Raine may refer to:

- James Raine (antiquary) (1791–1858), English antiquarian and typographer
- James Raine (Chancellor) (1830–1896), British antiquarian and ecclesiast
- James Raine (footballer) (1886–1928), English sportsman

== See also ==
- James Reyne (born 1957), Australian musician
