= Pamphlet =

Unbound book

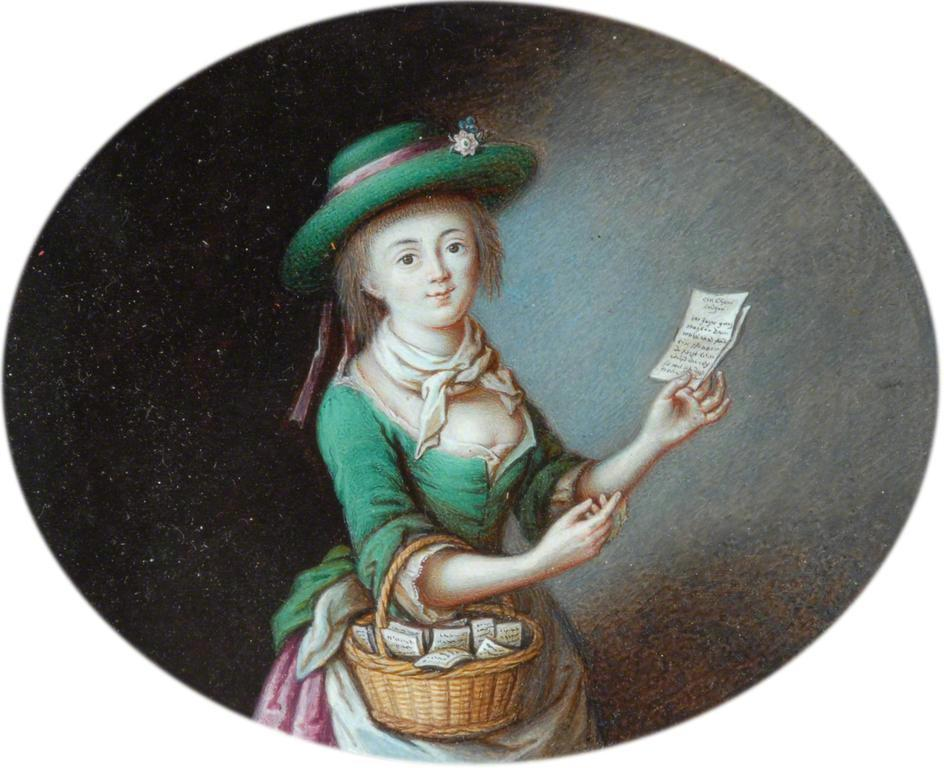
An 18th-century painting of a girl with a basket of pamphlets

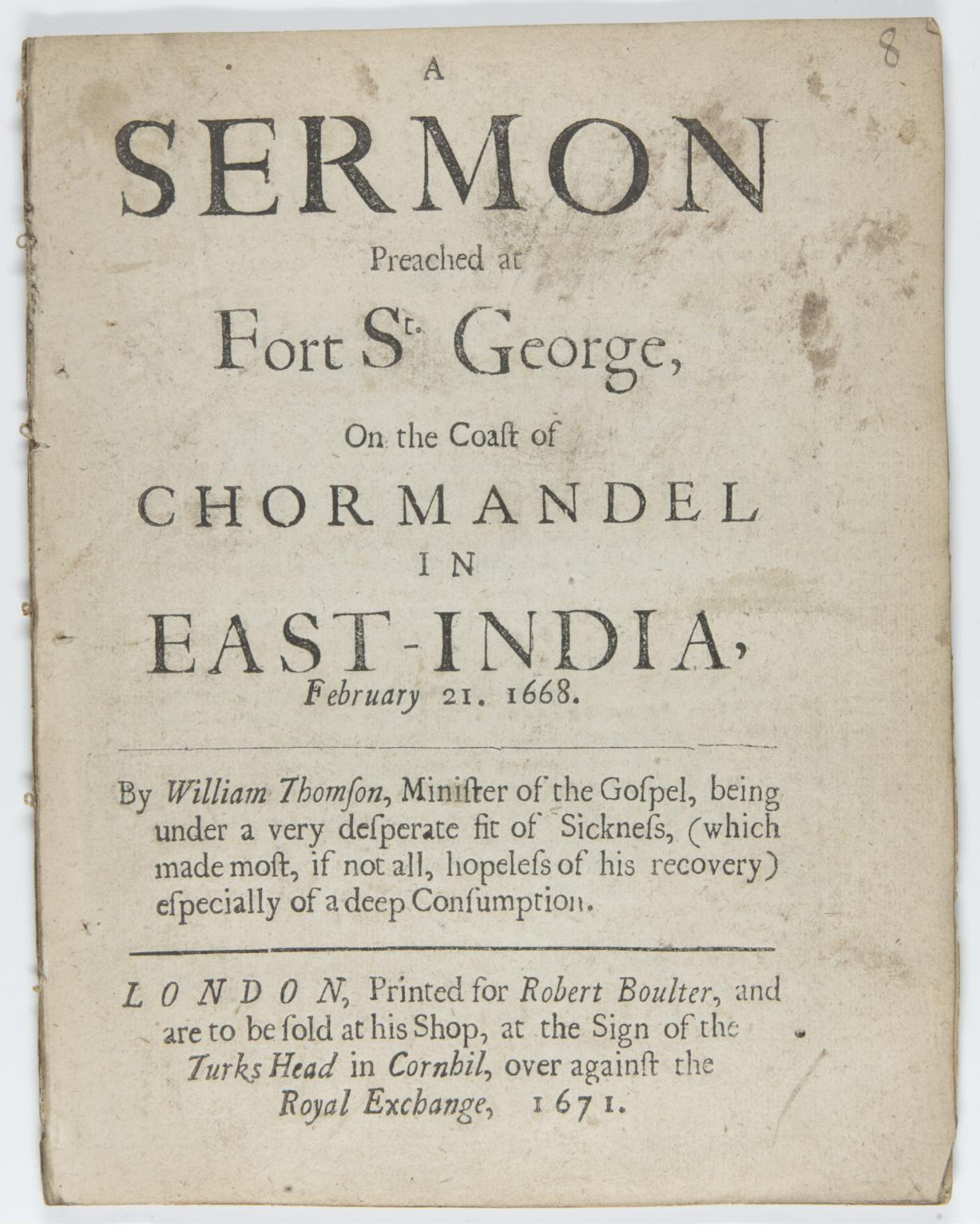
Due to their low cost and ease of production, pamphlets have often been used to popularize political or religious ideas.

A pamphlet is an unbound book (that is, without a hard cover or binding). Pamphlets may consist of a single sheet of paper that is printed on both sides and folded in half, in thirds, or in fourths, called a leaflet, or it may consist of a few pages that are folded and saddle stapled or sewn at the crease to make a simple book.

In the "International Standardization of Statistics Relating to Book Production and Periodicals", UNESCO defines a pamphlet as "a non-periodical printed publication of 5 to 48 pages, excluding covers, published in a specific country and available to the public," while a book is "a non-periodical printed publication of at least 49 pages, excluding covers." These definitions are intended solely for UNESCO's book production statistics.

== Etymology ==
The word pamphlet for a small work (opuscule) issued by itself without covers came into Middle English c. 1387 as pamphilet or panflet, generalized from a twelfth-century amatory comic poem with a satiric flavor, Pamphilus, seu de Amore ('Pamphilus: or, Concerning Love'), written in Latin. Pamphilus's name is derived from the Greek name Πάμφιλος, meaning "beloved of all". The poem was popular and widely copied and circulated on its own, forming a slim codex.

== History ==
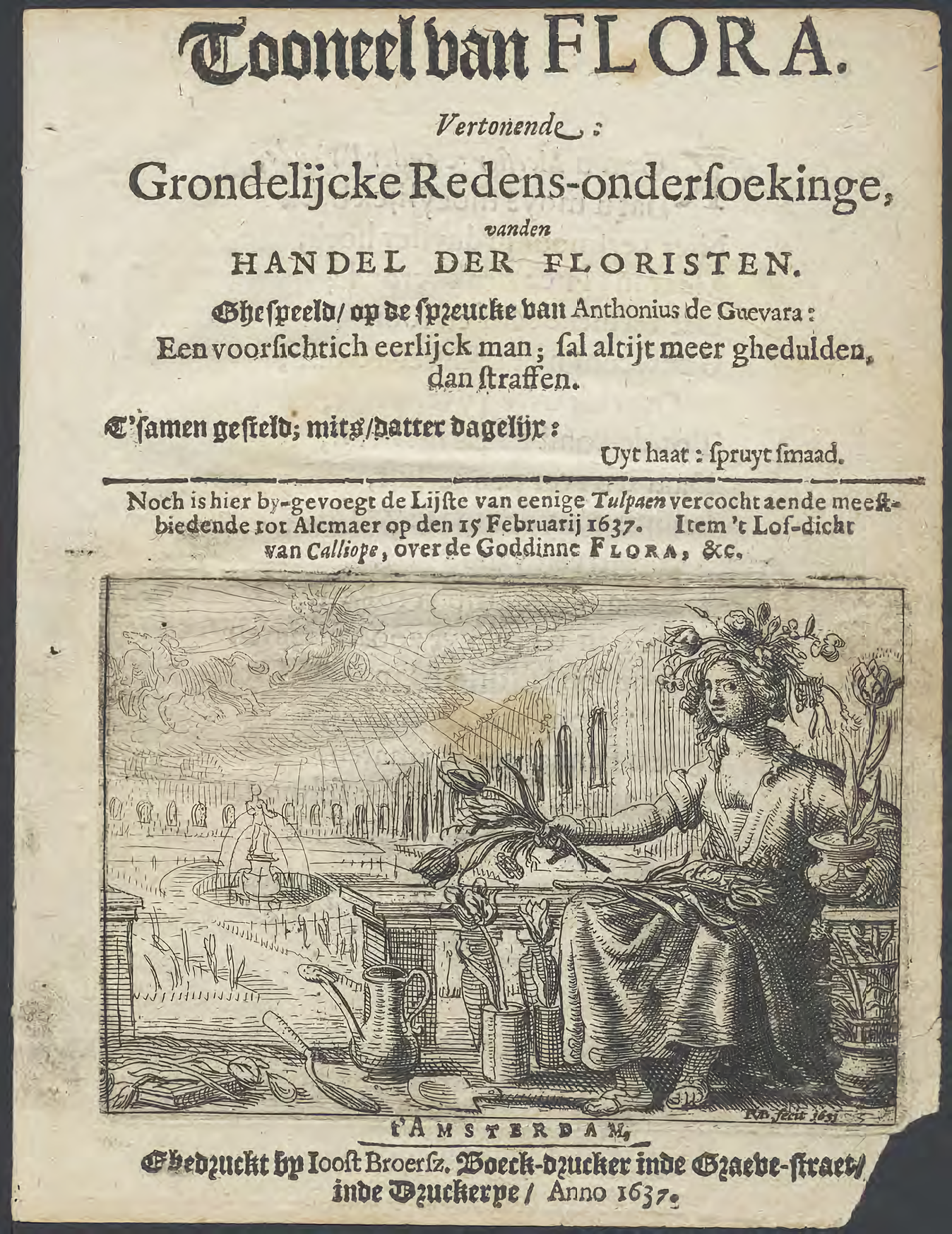
The pamphlet form of literature has been used for centuries as an economical vehicle for the broad distribution of information.

The earliest appearance of the word is in The Philobiblon (1344; ch. viii) of Richard de Bury, who speaks of "panfletos exiguos" {'little pamphlets'}.

Its modern connotations of a tract concerning a contemporary issue was a product of the heated arguments leading to the English Civil War; this sense appeared in 1642. In some European languages, this secondary connotation, of a disputatious tract, has come to the fore: compare libelle, from the Latin libellus, denoting a "little book". (Note: In German, French, Spanish and Italian pamphlet often has negative connotations of slanderous libel or religious propaganda; idiomatic neutral translations of the English pamphlet include flugblatt and broschüre in German; fascicule in French; and folleto in Spanish. In Russian and Romanian, the word памфлет in Russian Cyrillic, pamflet in Romanian, also normally connotes a work of propaganda or satire, so it is best translated as "brochure" (брошюра in Russian; broşură in Romanian).)

During the seventeenth century, pamphlets were used as tools of propaganda and resistance, within religion and politics, for examples as instruments of resistance against the Catholic Church and the absolute monarchy. They were mostly created and used to protect the interests of the emerging religious and bourgeois classes.

== Purpose ==
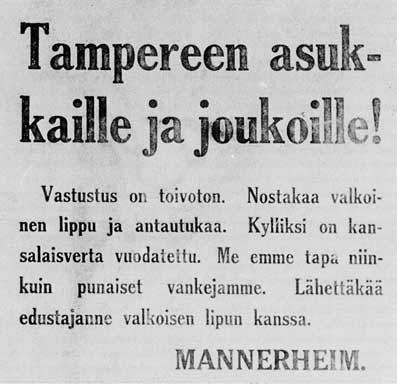
A 1918 Finnish propaganda pamphlet signed by General Mannerheim circulated by the Whites urging the Reds to surrender during the Finnish Civil War. English: To the residents and troops of Tampere! Resistance is hopeless. Raise the white flag and surrender. The blood of the citizen has been shed enough. We will not kill like the Reds kill their prisoners. Send your representative with a white flag.

Pamphlets can contain anything from information on kitchen appliances to medical information and religious treatises. Pamphlets are very important in marketing because they are cheap to produce and can be distributed easily to customers. Pamphlets have also long been an important tool of political protest and political campaigning for similar reasons.

A pamphleteer is a historical term for someone who produces or distributes pamphlets, especially for a political cause.

== Collectibility ==
Pamphlets are prized by many book collectors and collectors of ephemera, particularly for the wide array of political and religious perspectives given voice by the format's ease of production. Substantial accumulations have been amassed and transferred to ownership of academic research libraries around the world: particularly comprehensive collections of American political pamphlets are housed at New York Public Library, the Tamiment Library of New York University, and the Jo Labadie collection at the University of Michigan.

== Commercial uses ==
The pamphlet has been widely adopted in commerce, particularly as a format for marketing communications. There are numerous purposes for pamphlets, such as product descriptions or instructions, corporate information, event promotions or tourism guides and they are often used in the same way as leaflets or brochures.

== See also ==
- Brochure
- Chapbook
- Flyer (pamphlet)
- Long-form journalism
- Publishing
- Zine
