= William de Chambre (chronicler) =

William de Chambre (fl. 1365?) was a chronicler to whom Henry Wharton attributes the continuation of Robert de Graystanes' Historia Dunelmensis (History of Durham).

The "Continuation of Graystanes", which extends to 1571, survives in three manuscripts: one in the library of the dean and chapter of York Minster (xvi. i. 12 - perhaps from the library of Archbishop Tobias Matthew who was previously Dean of Durham); one in the British Museum (Cotton MS. Titus A, ii.); and one in the Bodleian Library at the University of Oxford (Fairfax MS. 6).

Wharton, who reprinted the work in his Anglia Sacra of 1691, attributed the entire History to de Chambre, on the basis that the Cotton manuscript contains a separate life of Richard de Bury ("Vita Ricardi"), which it says was "extracted from the History of Durham by William de Chambre". However, Antiquarian James Raine, who edited the works of Geoffrey of Coldingham, de Graystanes and de Chambre for publication by the Surtees Society in 1839, advanced that this did not establish that the entire work to 1571 was the work of de Chambre, and noted that in the York manuscript, the Vita Ricardi is written in a fourteen century hand, indicating that it must be the work of a fourteenth century, not a sixteenth century, author.

During the production of his 1839 edition, Raine discovered a 1365 corrody granting one Willielmus de l'Chambre the office of hall-marshall at Durham Priory, and suggested that it is "more than probable" that this is the same person as the author of the Vita Ricardi, confirming his fourteenth-century date; noting also that the writing attributed to de Chambre becomes notably less extensive after the early fifteenth century, a plausible lifespan for someone at the peak of his abilities in 1365.
