= Thomas Rud =

English antiquarian

- Born: 1668
- Died: 17 March 1732–3
- Occupation: Antiquarian

Thomas Rud (1668 – 17 March 1732–3) was an English antiquarian.

== Biography ==
Rud was baptised at Stockton on 2 January 1667–8, was son of Thomas Rud (1641–1719), curate of Stockton, afterwards vicar of Norton and rector of Long Newton, all in the county of Durham, who married at Stockton, on 13 November 1666, Alice, daughter of Thomas Watson of Stockton. From Durham grammar school he was admitted as subsizar at Trinity College, Cambridge, on 2 February 1683–4, and graduated B.A. 1687, M.A. 1691. From 1697 to 1699 he was the master of his old school at Durham, and from 1699 to 1710 he was head master at Newcastle grammar school and master of St. Mary's Hospital. In 1707, he printed at Cambridge a Latin syntax and prosody compiled for the use of his scholars.

In 1711, Rud returned to Durham, where he was instituted to the vicarage of St. Oswald (1 Sept.); he received in the same year the posts of lecturer of holy-day sermons in the cathedral and librarian to the dean and chapter. He was promoted in 1725 to the vicarage of Northallerton, and held with it, from June 1729, the rectory of Washington, co. Durham. He was collated, on 9 July 1728, as prebendary of the fifth stall at Ripon collegiate church, and retained these preferments until his death. He died on 17 March 1732–3. His wife was Isabel, daughter of Cuthbert Hendry of Shincliffe, near Durham, and they had several children.

Rud compiled with much labour and learning, and with beautiful penmanship, a catalogue of the manuscripts at Durham Cathedral, which he completed at North Allerton on 15 September 1727. It was printed for the dean and chapter under the editorship of the Rev. James Raine, and with an appendix by him, in 1825. To Rud Raine owed much of the material embodied in the latter's ‘Catalogi veteres Librorum Eccl. Cathedralis Dunelm.’ (Surtees Soc. 1838). To Thomas Bedford's edition of the treatise of Symeon of Durham, ‘De exordio atque procursu Dunhelmensis ecclesiæ’ (1732), there was prefixed a Latin dissertation (pp. i–xxxv) by Rud, proving, in opposition to the views of Selden, that Symeon of Durham, and not Turgot, was its author. Rud's copy of this work, with the errors of the press corrected, and with some important additions, ultimately passed to Dr. Raine (Surtees Soc. vii. 149–50). Rud contributed to the two volumes of ‘Miscellaneous Observations upon Authors, Ancient and Modern,’ which were edited by Dr. Jortin in 1731–2, several articles signed T. R., chiefly relating to the Arundelian marbles. A copy of Beza's New Testament (1582), at the British Museum, has many manuscript notes by Rud.
