= Thomas James =

English librarian and clergyman (1573–1629)

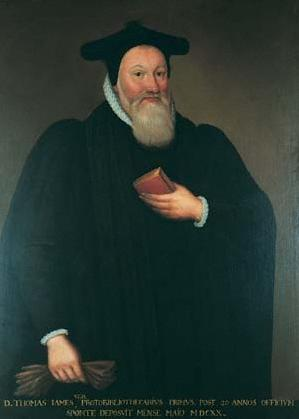
- Born: c. 1573; Newport, Isle of Wight, England
- Died: August 1629 (aged 55–56); Oxford, England

Academic background
- Education: New College, Oxford

Academic work
- Main interests: First librarian of the Bodleian Library
- Notable ideas: Library catalogue

Thomas James (c. 1573 – August 1629) was an English librarian and Anglican clergyman, the first librarian of the Bodleian Library, Oxford.

== Life ==
James was born about 1573 at Newport, Isle of Wight. In 1586 he was admitted a scholar of Winchester College and matriculated at New College, Oxford, on 28 January 1592. He then graduated B.A. on 3 May 1595, M.A. on 5 February 1599, and B.D. and D.D. on 16 May 1614.

James became a fellow of New College in 1593, where he served until 1602. In that year, his wide knowledge of books, together with his skill in deciphering manuscripts and detecting literary forgeries, secured him the post of librarian to the library newly founded by Sir Thomas Bodley at Oxford.

At the same time, he was made rector of St Aldate's Church, Oxford. In 1605, he compiled a classified catalogue of the books in the Bodleian Library, but in 1620 substituted for it an alphabetical catalogue. The arrangement in 1610, whereby the Worshipful Company of Stationers and Newspaper Makers (Stationers' Company) undertook to supply the Bodleian with a copy of every book published, was James's suggestion.

He assisted in framing a complete body of the ancient statutes and customs of the university. He was also skilled in deciphering manuscripts and in detecting forged readings. He obtained leave to examine the manuscripts in the college libraries at Oxford, and was allowed by easy-going heads of houses (particularly those of Balliol and Merton) to take away several, chiefly patristic, which he gave in 1601 to the Bodleian Library, together with sixty printed volumes.

Bodley had fixed upon James as his library keeper, and the appointment was confirmed by the university in 1602. His salary as librarian was initially £22 13s. 4d. annually, but he threatened to resign unless it was raised to £30 or £40 a year. Bodley raised the salary by 4 pounds per year. This eventually led to a compensation of 40 pounds per year after 1611. On 14 September 1602 he also became rector of St. Aldate, Oxford. 18 October of that same year, James married his wife, Ann Underhill. Both of these actions, taking place just two months before the library's opening, were in direct opposition to qualifications outlined by Bodley for his librarian. Bodley, who had not been a churchgoer or the marrying type, wanted his librarian to be completely concentrated on the library. Eventually, however, Bodley approved of James's choices.

In December 1610 the library began to receive copies of all works published by the members of the Stationers' Company, under an agreement made with them by Bodley at the suggestion of James. In 1614 James, through Bodley's interest, was preferred to the sub-deanery of Wells, and in 1617 he became rector of Mongeham, Kent. At the beginning of May 1620 he was obliged through ill-health to resign the librarianship.

At the convocation held with the parliament at Oxford in 1625 he moved that certain scholars be commissioned to peruse the patristic manuscripts in all public and private English libraries to detect forgeries introduced by Roman Catholic editors. His proposal not meeting with much encouragement, he set about the task himself. Ill health compelled him to resign his post in 1620, he died at Oxford in August 1629, and was buried in New College Chapel.

== Works ==
His first attempts at authorship were translations from the Italian of Antonio Brucioli's 'Commentary upon the Canticle of Canticles,' which was licensed for the press in November 1597, and from the French of Guillaume du Vair The Moral Philosophy of the Stoicks, London, 1598. He next edited Richard de Bury's The Philobiblon, Oxford, 1599, which he dedicated to Sir Thomas Bodley. In this dedication, James praised Bodley and his colleagues for their efforts in reestablishing the Oxford library, though there was never any indication of his future role as librarian. As the result of his researches in college libraries he published 'Ecloga Oxonio-Cantabrigiensis, tributa in libros duos,' London, 1600, a work commended by Joseph Scaliger. It gives a list of the manuscripts in the college libraries at Oxford and Cambridge, and in the university library at Cambridge, besides critical notes on the text of Cyprian's 'De Unitate Ecclesiæ' and of Augustine of Hippo's De fide.

The "Index Alphabeticus" the first catalog compiled by James, which consisted of 8,700 entries, appeared in July 1605. It was dedicated to Henry Frederick, Prince of Wales, at the suggestion of Bodley (who thought that 'more reward was to be gained from the prince than from the king'). It includes both printed books and manuscripts, arranged alphabetically under the four classes of theology, medicine, law, and arts. A continuation of this classified index, embracing writers on arts and sciences, geography and history, is to be found in Rawlinson MS. Miscell. 730, drawn up by James after quitting the library. An alphabetical catalogue prepared by him in 1613 was not printed, but remained in the library. A second edition of the catalogue appeared in 1620. It abandoned the classified arrangement of the former catalogue, and adopts only one alphabet of names. There was also issued in 1635 'Catalogus Interpretum S. Scripturæ juxta numerorum ordinem qui extant in Bibliotheca Bodleiana olim a D. Jamesio ... concinnatus, nunc vero altera fere parte auctior redditus. ... Editio correcta,' Oxford. In 1604, Bodley noted some errors James had made in cataloguing the Hebrew manuscripts, suggesting that James should check with scholars fluent in Hebrew.

Before 1611, James was on a committee working on the Authorised Version of the Bible.

James's other works are:

- ‘Bellum Papale, sive Concordia discors Sixti Quinti & Clementis Octavi circa Hieronymianam Editionem,’ London, 1600; 1678.
- ‘Concordantiæ sanctorum Patrum, i.e. vera & pia Libri Canticorum per Patres universos, tam Græcos quam Latinos, Expositio,’ Oxford, 1607.
- ‘An Apologie for John Wickliffe, shewing his Conformitie with the now Church of England,’ Oxford, 1608; in answer to Robert Parsons and others.
- 'Bellum Gregorianum, sive Corruptionis Romanæ in Operibus D. Gregorii M. jussu Pontificum Rom. recognitis atque editis ex Typographica Vaticana loca insigniora, observata, Theologis ad hoc officium deputatis,' Oxford, 1610.
- 'A Treatise of the Corruption of Scripture, Counsels, and Fathers, by ... the Church of Rome. ... Together with a sufficient Answere unto J. Gretser and A. Possevine, Jesuites, and the unknowne Author of the Grounds of the Old Religion and the New,' 5 pts. London, 1611; other editions in 1612, 1688, and 1843. Against Jakob Gretser and Antonio Possevino.
- 'The Jesuits Downefall threatened against them by the Secular Priests for their wicked lives, accursed manners, heretical doctrine, etc. Together with the Life of Father Parsons,' Oxford, 1612.
- 'Index generalis sanctorum Patrum, ad singulos versus cap. 5. secundum Matthæum,' London, 1624.
- 'G. Wicelii Methodus Concordiæ Ecclesiasticæ ... Adjectæ sunt notæ ... et vita ipsius ... una cum enumeratione auctorum qui scripserunt contra squalores ... Curiæ Romanæ,' London, 1625. On Georg Witzel.
- 'Vindiciæ Gregorianæ, seu restitutus innumeris pæne locis Gregorius M., ex variis manuscriptis ... collatis,' Geneva, 1625, with a preface by B. Turrettinus.
- 'A Manuduction or Introduction unto Divinitie: containing a confutation of Papists by Papists throughout the important Articles of our Religion,’ Oxford, 1625.
- ‘The humble … Request of T. James to the Church of England, for, and in the behalfe of, Bookes touching Religion,’ Oxford? 1625?
- ‘An Explanation or Enlarging of the Ten Articles in the Supplication of Doctor James, lately exhibited to the Clergy of England’ [in reference to a projected new edition of the ‘Fathers’], Oxford, 1625.
- 'Specimen Corruptelarum Pontificiorum in Cypriano, Ambrosio, Gregorio M. & Authore operis imperfecti, & in jure canonico,' London, 1626.
- 'Index generalis librorum prohibitorum a Pontificiis,' Oxford, 1627.

James is said to have been the 'Catholike Divine' who edited, with preface and notes in English, the tract entitled 'Fiscus Papalis; sive, Catalogus Indulgentiarum & Reliquiarum septem principalium Ecclesiarum urbis Romæ ex vetusto Manuscripto Codice descriptus,' London, 1617; another edition, 1621, was accompanied by the English version of William Crashaw. In 1608 James edited John Wycliffe's 'Two short Treatises against the Orders of the Begging Friars.' Four of his manuscripts are in Lambeth Palace Library:

1. 'Brevis Admonitio ad Theologos Protestantes de Libris Pontificorum caute, pie, ac sobrie habendis, legendis, emendis,' &c.
2. 'Enchiridion Theologicum, seu Chronologia Scriptorum Ecclesiasticorum, ordine alphabetico,' &c.
3. 'Suspicionum et Conjecturarum liber primus, in quo ducenta ad minus loca SS. Patrum in dubium vocata, dubitandi Rationes, Rationum Summæ perspicue continentur.'
4. 'Breviarium Episcoporum totius Angliæ, seu nomina, successio, et chronologia eorundem ad sua usque tempora.' In the Bodleian Library (Bodl. MS. 662) is his 'Tomus primus Animadversionum in Patres, Latinæque Ecclesiæ Doctores primarios.' Two letters from James to Sir Robert Bruce Cotton, dated 1625 and 1628, are preserved in Cotton. MS. Julius C. iii., ff. 159, 183. Bodley's letters to James are in 'Reliquiæ Bodleianæ,' published by Thomas Hearne, from Bodleian MS. 699, in 1703.
