= Cornforth =

Village in County Durham, England

Coordinates: 54.70288°N 1.51551°W

- Location within County Durham
- Population: 2,501 (2011)
- OS grid reference: NZ313343
- Unitary authority: County Durham
- Ceremonial county: County Durham
- Region: North East
- Country: England
- Sovereign state: United Kingdom
- Post town: Ferryhill
- Postcode district: DL17
- Dialling code: 01740
- Police: Durham
- Fire: County Durham and Darlington
- Ambulance: North East
- UK Parliament: Sedgefield

Cornforth is a village in County Durham, England. It is adjacent to the village of West Cornforth, situated a short distance to the north-east of Ferryhill.

Before the middle part of the Victorian era, when coal mining was at its height in County Durham, Cornforth was in the parish of Bishop Middleham.

Thomas Hutchinson (bap. 1698, d. 1769) was a classical scholar, born in Cornforth and baptised there on 17 May 1698.

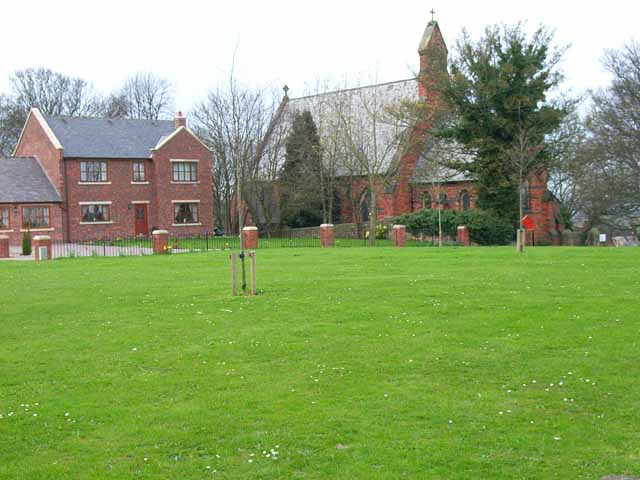
Village green and church at Cornforth
