= Chilton Lane =

Village in County Durham, England

Coordinates: 54°40′24″N 1°31′46″W

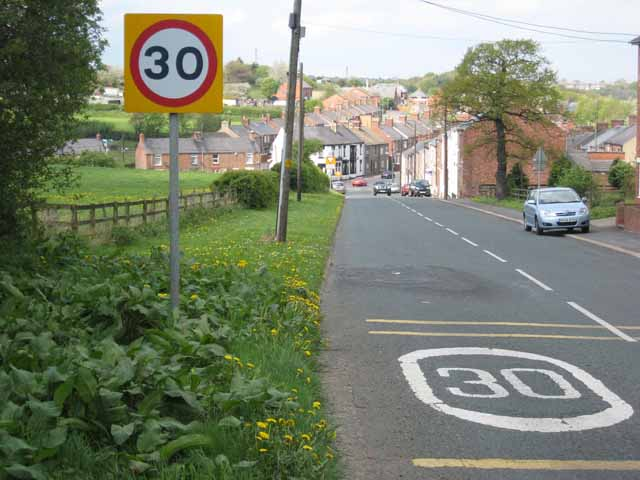
Entering Chilton Lane from the south

Chilton Lane is a village in County Durham, England, situated a short distance to the south-east of Ferryhill, and immediately to the south of Ferryhill Station. Nearby are Great Chilton, East Chilton, Chilton Grange and Little Chilton.

== History ==
Chilton Lane was developed as a result of the growth of the railway community of Ferryhill Station and the mine of Little Chilton Colliery. The colliery at Little Chilton opened in the early 1840s. It was owned by John Evelyn Dennison, M. P. and Christopher Wilkinson. Initially housing was built to house the workforce of some 400. The coming of the Clarence and North Eastern Railway resulted in two terraces of house being built, known as Railway Rows, were built opposite the entrance to the colliery.

Although the colliery had a limited life the village expanded with the sinking of Mainsforth Colliery. Chilton Lane was a commercial centre for the community, a Primitive Methodist Chapel and Sunday School was built in 1862. A school was opened in 1878, along with a mission church of Saint Lukes Church, Ferryhill.

Despite being designated as a Category D village in 1950, it continues to support a vibrant community.
