= Bob Cole (cricketer) =

English cricketer (born 1938)

Personal information
- Full name: Robert Cole
- Born: 27 November 1938 (age 87); Ferryhill Station, County Durham, England
- Batting: Right-handed
- Role: Wicket-keeper

Domestic team information
- Years: Team
- 1958–1974: Durham

Career statistics
Competition	List A
Matches	7
Runs scored	1
Batting average	1.00
100s/50s	–/–
Top score	1
Balls bowled	–
Wickets	–
Bowling average	–
5 wickets in innings	–
10 wickets in match	–
Best bowling	–
Catches/stumpings	8/–
- Source: Cricinfo, 6 August 2011

Robert Cole (born 27 November 1938) is a former English cricketer. Cole was a right-handed batsman who fielded as a wicket-keeper. He was born in Ferryhill Station, County Durham.

Cole made his debut for Durham against the Lancashire Second XI in the 1958 Minor Counties Championship. He played Minor counties cricket for Durham from 1958 to 1974, making 118 Minor Counties Championship appearances. He made his List A debut against Hertfordshire in the 1964 Gillette Cup. He made 6 further List A appearances, the last of which came against Essex in the 1973 Gillette Cup. In his 7 List A matches, he scored just a single run. Batting at number 11, he had 3 further batting innings in which he remained not out without scoring. Behind the stumps he took 8 catches.
