= Angelo Raine =

British clergyman and archivist

Rev Angelo Raine
- Born: 1877; York, England
- Died: 5 October 1962 (aged 84–85); Lavenham, Suffolk, England
- Education: Hatfield College, Durham
- Occupations: Clergyman; Antiquarian
- Parent(s): James Raine and Annie Keyworth
- Church: Christ Church, Spitalfields; St Martin-on-the-Hill, Scarborough; St Edward the Confessor, Dringhouses; All Saints', Pavement, York

Angelo Raine (1877 – 5 October 1962) was a British clergyman, antiquarian and archivist.

In addition to his ecclesiastical duties, Raine served as honorary archivist for the city of York and wrote several works on the history and archaeology of the city.

== Early life and education ==
Raine was born in York in 1877, one of nine children of James Raine and his wife Annie (née Keyworth). He grew up in Petergate and was educated at St Peter's School, York. He received a licence in theology from Durham University in 1900 and graduated with a Bachelor of Arts degree in 1903.

== Career ==
Raine was ordained at York Minster and subsequently moved to London, where he worked with Dick Sheppard at Oxford House, a settlement in Bethnal Green. He also served as a curate at Christ Church, Stepney and was a witness to the Siege of Sidney Street in 1911. During the First World War he served at St Martin-on-the-Hill, Scarborough, and later in Whitby. In 1919, he became vicar of St Edward the Confessor's Church, Dringhouses, where he remained until 1937. His wife became the first woman to attend the parish's annual general meeting in 1920.

In 1937, Raine became vicar of All Saints, Pavement, serving there until his retirement in 1956.

=== Antiquarian work ===
Raine shared his father's interest in the history and archaeology of York and served as honorary city archivist for many years. He was elected to the council of the Yorkshire Philosophical Society in 1929, and became a vice-president of the society in 1933. His most notable publication as a scholar, Mediaeval York (1955), was the culmination of 30 years of research.

Following his retirement in 1956, Raine moved to Lavenham in Suffolk. He died on 5 October 1962 and was buried in the family grave at York Cemetery.

== Selected publications ==
=== Books ===
- Raine, Angelo (1926). History of St. Peter's School: York: A.D. 627 to the Present Day. London: G. Bell and Sons.
- ——— (1955). Mediaeval York: A Topographical Survey Based on Original Sources. London: John Murray.

=== Journal articles ===
- Raine, Angelo (1922). "Roman Inscribed Stones Found at York". Yorkshire Archaeological Journal. 26: 390–391.
- ——— (1933). "The Birth-place of Guy Fawkes". Proceedings of the Yorkshire Architectural and York Archaeological Society. 1 (1): 30–32.
- ——— (1948). "Recent Archaeological Work on Roman York". Archaeological Newsletter. 6: 7–9.
