= A. Hamilton Thompson =

Historian of the Middle Ages

Alexander Hamilton Thompson, CBE FBA FSA (7 November 1873 – 4 September 1952) was a historian. He was Professor of Medieval History at the University of Leeds from 1924 to 1939.

== Early life and education ==
Thompson was born on 7 November 1873 at Clifton, Bristol, the son of The Reverend John Thompson, Vicar of St Gabriel's, Bristol, and his wife Annie Hastings (née Cooper, daughter of Canon David Cooper). He attended Clifton College from 1883 to 1890 and Totnes School for a year. He gained a minor scholarship to read Classics at St John's College, Cambridge from 1892 to 1895. He received his BA in 1895, later promoted to MA in 1903.

== Academic career ==
After graduating, Thompson tutored in Europe until 1897, when he returned to Cambridge as an extramural teacher; he was a lecturer for the Cambridge University Extension course until 1919. During this period, he began publishing books on English literature, the history and architecture of the English parish church and military architecture in medieval England.

Thompson was appointed a lecturer in English at Armstrong College, Newcastle upon Tyne (then part of Durham University, now Newcastle University) in 1919. He was promoted to Reader in Medieval History and Archaeology in 1921.

In 1922, Thompson moved to the University of Leeds, where he was appointed Reader in Medieval History and promoted to Professor two years later. He was head of the Department of History at Leeds from 1927 until his retirement in 1939. During this period, he published studies of buildings and editions of medieval records.

Thompson was the Ford Lecturer at the University of Oxford in 1932-33. His subject was The English clergy and their organisation in the later Middle Ages. He was Birkbeck Lecturer at Trinity College, Cambridge, in 1933-35 on The English Church at the Opening of the Sixteenth Century.

Thompson was a member of several public bodies responsible for historic buildings.

== Honours ==
Alongside three honorary doctorates, Thompson was elected a Member of the Royal Archaeological Institute in 1909, a Fellow of the Society of Antiquaries (FSA) in 1910 or 1911, and a Fellow of the British Academy (FBA) in 1928. He was appointed a Commander of the Order of the British Empire (CBE) in 1938 and served as president of the Royal Archaeological Institute from 1939 to 1945. He was the subject of a Festschrift in 1948.

Thompson was President of the Leicestershire Archaeological Society from 1937 until his death in 1952.

== Marriage and children ==
Thompson married Amy Gosling in 1903. They had two children.

== Death ==
Thompson died in Exmouth on 4 September 1952 at the age of 78. His wife predeceased him in 1945.

== Selected works ==
- Cambridge and Its Colleges (London: Methuen, 1898; 3rd ed., 1910; 5th ed., 1920)
- History of English Literature and of Its Chief Writers (London: John Murray, 1901)
- (editor) William Shakespeare, His Family and Friends (London: John Murray, 1903)
- (editor) The Works of Sir John Suckling in Prose and Verse (London: George Routledge and Sons, 1910)
- The Ground Plan of the English Parish Church, The Cambridge Manuals of Science and Literature (Cambridge: Cambridge University Press, 1911)
- The Historical Growth of the English Church, The Cambridge Manuals of Science and Literature (Cambridge: Cambridge University Press, 1911)
- (editor) John Dryden, Virgil's Æneid, English Literature for Schools (1911)
- Military Architecture in England during the Middle Ages (London: Henry Frowde, 1912)
- English Monasteries (Cambridge: Cambridge University Press, 1913)
- (editor) Alexander Pope, Essay on Man (Cambridge: Cambridge University Press, 1913)
- (editor) Charles Lamb, Essays of Elia, 2 vols. (Cambridge: Cambridge University Press, 1913)
- Visitations of Religious Houses in the Diocese of Lincoln, 3 vols., Publications of the Lincoln Record Society, nos. 7, 14 and 21 (Horncastle: W. K. Morton for the Lincoln Record Society, 1914–29)
- English Romantic Poets, 6 vols. (Cambridge: Cambridge University Press, 1915–22)
- Selections from the Poems of Samuel Taylor Coleridge (Cambridge: Cambridge University Press, 1916)
- Selections from the Poems of William Wordsworth (Cambridge: Cambridge University Press, 1917)
- (editor) Alain René Le Sage, Turcaret: Comédie (Cambridge: Cambridge University Press, 1918)
- (editor) François-René Chateaubriand, Mémoires d'Outre-Tombe. Première Partie-Livres VIII et IX (Cambridge: Cambridge University Press, 1920)
- (editor) Charles Lamb, Miscellaneous Essays (Cambridge: Cambridge University Press, 1921)
- (editor) Sir Walter Scott, Selections (Cambridge: Cambridge University Press, 1922)
- Northumberland Pleas from the Curia Regis and Assize Rolls, 1198–1272, Publications of the Newcastle upon Tyne Records Committee. no. 2 (Newcastle-upon-Tyne, 1922)
- Liber Vitae Ecclesiae Dunelmensis: A Collotype Facsimile of the Original Manuscript, with Introductory Essays and Notes, Publications of the Surtees Society, vol. 136 (Durham: Andrews and Co. for the Surtees Society, 1923)
- (originally prepared by William Brown) The Register of Archbishop Thomas Corbridge, Lord Archbishop of York, 1300–1304, 2 vols., Publications of the Surtees Society, nos. 138, 141 (Durham: Andrews and Co. for the Surtees Society, 1925–28)
- The Cathedral Churches of England (London: SPCK, 1925)
- The Building of York Minster (London: SPCK, 1927)
- York Minster Historical Tracts, 627-1927 (London: SPCK, 1927)
- History and Architectural Description of the Priory of St Mary, Bolton-in-Wharfedale, Publications of the Thoresby Society, no. 30 (Leeds: J. Whitehead and Son, 1928)
- A Bibliography of the Published Writings of Sir William St John Hope (Leeds: J. Whitehead and Son, 1929)
- The Statutes of the Cathedral Church of Durham, Publications of the Surtees Society, no. 143 (Durham: Andrews and Co. for the Surtees Society, 1929)
- The Register of Archbishop William Greenfield, Lord Archbishop of York, 1306–1315, 5 vols., Publications of the Surtees Society, nos. 145, 149, 151–153 (Durham: Andrews for the Surtees Society, 1931–38)
- (editor) William Shakespeare, King Richard the Third (London: Methuen and Co., 1932)
- Fasti Parochiales, 2 vols., Yorkshire Archaeological Society Record Series, nos. 85 and 107 (Wakefield: Yorkshire Archaeological Society, 1933 and 1943)
- A Calendar of Charters and Other Documents Belonging to the Hospital of William Wyggeston at Leicester (Leicester: Edgar Backus, 1933)
- Selection from the Poems of John Keats (Cambridge: Cambridge University Press, 1933)
- (editor) Bede, His Life, Times and Writings: Essays in Commemoration of the Twelfth Century of his Death (Oxford: Clarendon Press, 1935)
- Roche Abbey (London: HMSO, 1936)
- Easby Abbey (London: HMSO, 1936). Full text of second edition (1948) available at Internet Archive
- (editor) Childe Harold's Pilgrimage (Cambridge: Cambridge University Press, 1937)
- The History of the Hospital and the New College of the Annunciation of St. Mary in the Newarke, Leicester (Leicester: Edgar Backus, 1937)
- The Premonstratensian Abbey of Welbeck (London: Faber and Faber, 1938)
- Visitations in the Diocese of Lincoln 1517–1531, 2 vols., Publications of the Lincoln Record Society, nos. 33, 35 and 37 (Hereford: The Hereford Times for the Lincoln Record Society, 1940–47)
- The Life and Work of Mandell Creighton (Carlisle: Charles Thurnam and Sons, 1943)
- The English Clergy and Their Organisation in the Later Middle Ages (Oxford: Clarendon Press, 1947)
- The Abbey of St Mary of the Meadows Leicester (Leicester: Edgar Backus, 1949)
- Landisfarne Priory, Northumberland, Ministry of Works Ancient Monuments Inspectorate Official Guides (London: HMSO, 1949)
- Northumbrian Pleas from the De Blanco Rolls, Publications of the Surtees Society, nos. 158–159 (Durham: Andrews and Co. for the Surtees Society, 1950)
- Netley Abbey (London: HMSO, 1952)

Professional and academic associations
Preceded by Henry Gee	Secretary of the Surtees Society; 1920–50	Succeeded by H. S. Offler
