= H. S. Offler =

English historian and editor

Hilary Seton Offler (3 February 1913 – 24 January 1991) was an English historian and editor. The Professor of Medieval History at Durham University from 1956 to 1978, he was an expert on medieval German history and the political works of William of Ockham (which he edited for publication).

== Early life and education ==
Offler was born in Hereford, Herefordshire on 3 February 1913; his father Horace was the general manager of King's Acre Nurseries in the city. He attended Hereford High School for Boys, before going up to Emmanuel College, Cambridge; he had won a scholarship to Emmanuel College at the age of 15 in 1928, but continued at school until 1930. He placed in the first class in Parts I and II of the history Tripos, graduating in 1933. He then spent a year studying the theology Tripos; placing in the first class in 1934, he won the Lightfoot Scholarship and was elected to a research studentship at Emmanuel; under C. W. Previté-Orton's supervision, he worked on the reign of the Holy Roman Emperor Louis IV (the Bavarian) and visited Germany and France to study archival sources. His PhD thesis on Louis was submitted in 1938, though he never took the degree.

== Career and honours ==
In 1936, Offler was elected to a research fellowship at his college; he held it for four years. During the Second World War, he fought in an anti-aircraft regiment of the Royal Artillery, initially in Scotland and Ireland but from 1942 in North Africa (including a period of secondment with the Free French Army in 1943), Italy and France. On demobilisation in 1946, he took up a lectureship at the University of Bristol. In 1947, he was appointed Reader in Medieval History at Durham University. He wrote A Short History of Switzerland (1952). He was promoted to Professor of Medieval History in 1956 and retired in 1978.

Though he continued to write articles on medieval German history into the 1950s, Offler had already turned to editing William of Ockham's political works, a project begun by J. G. Sikes, who bequeathed his papers to Offler (who had edited a text for the volume and continued R. H. Snape's version of another) and R. F. Bennett in 1941. The project published editions of Ockham's texts under the title Opera Politica; the first volume had been completed by Sikes in 1940. Offler edited the third volume, which came out in 1956. Bennett had carried out a revision of his and Sike's earlier work on volume two, but left Offler to complete this after 1958; the edition came out in 1963. Offler revised the first volume (published in 1974) and then completed the final, fourth volume of the series, which was not published until 1997.

Alongside his work on Ockham, he was also interested in the medieval history of the north of England, especially Durham and its bishops. He edited Durham Episcopal Charters, 1071–1152 for the Surtees Society (1968), of which society he was president from 1980 to 1987.

Offler was elected a fellow of the British Academy in 1974. He died on 24 January 1991. A compilation of his writings was edited by A. J. Piper and A. I. Doyle and published as North of the Tees: Studies in Medieval British History (Aldershot: Variorum, 1996).

Professional and academic associations
Preceded by John Herbert Severn Wild	President of the Surtees Society; 1980–87	Succeeded by Richard Barrie Dobson
Preceded by Alexander Hamilton Thompson	Secretary of the Surtees Society; 1950–66	Succeeded by W. A. L. Seaman
