= Thomas Hutchinson (scholar) =

English clergyman and classical scholar

Thomas Hutchinson (bap. 1698, d. 1769) was an English clergyman and classical scholar.

== Life ==
The son of Peter Hutchinson of Cornforth, in the parish of Bishop Middleham, Sedgefield, County Durham, he was baptised there on 17 May 1698. He matriculated at Lincoln College, Oxford, on 28 March 1715, and graduated B.A. 1718, M.A. 1721, B.D. (from Hart Hall) 1733, and D.D. 1738. In 1731 he was appointed rector of Lyndon, Rutland, having acquired a reputation as a scholar by the publication of an edition of Xenophon's Cyropaedia (1727). Thomas Herring, Archbishop of Canterbury, presented him to the vicarage of Horsham, Sussex, in 1748, and he held also the rectory of Cocking in the same county, and a prebendal stall in Chichester Cathedral. Dying at Horsham, he was buried there on 7 February 1769.

== Works ==
He published several sermons and an essay on demoniacal possession, which attracted considerable notice.

- Xenophon's Cyropaedia - 1727
- Xenophon's Anabasis - 1735
- The Usual Interpretation of δαίμονες and δαιμονία [Daimones and Daimonia] - 1738.
