= Mainsforth Colliery =

Colliery in UK

Coordinates: 54.6782°N 1.5256°W

Mainsforth Colliery was situated between Ferryhill and the small hamlet of Mainsforth in County Durham, England, United Kingdom. It was adjacent to the former Ferryhill railway station in the Ferryhill Station area of the town.

Mainsforth Colliery operated from 1872 to 1968, mining coal in the UK, deep underground.

== Name ==
The name ‘Mainsforth’ is thought to mean the ford of someone called Maino (a Germanic name) and the ford probably crossed the boggy land called ‘The Carrs’ to the west.

== Operating life ==
In 1872 Mainsforth Colliery opened. In 1873 two shafts, the East and the West, were sunk 270 ft to the Five Quarter seam. It was worked until 1876 before being laid in. These workings were abandoned by 1877 and the shafts used as a rubbish dump. 23 years later, in 1900 the Carlton Iron Company re-excavated the abandoned shafts and de-watered the workings. The Colliery reopened in 1904 and the company deepened the shafts to the Harvey seam and to prove the Busty and Brockwell seams.

== Ownership ==
The Mainsforth Coal Company operated the mine initially. The Carlton iron Company took over in the 1890s. Ownership passed to Dorman and Long of Middlesbrough in the 1920s. In 1947 the National Coal Board took over, following nationalisation of the mines.

== Closure ==
When the Dean & Chapter Colliery closed on 15 January 1966, it stopped pumping and the water ran to Chilton, Leasingthorne and Mainsforth, reaching Mainsforth in September 1967. This caused Mainsforth Colliery's closure in December 1968. The last shift at Mainsforth Colliery was on December 6, 1968.

== Economic importance ==
The Dean and Chapter Colliery and Mainsforth Colliery were the main employers in the area.

Coal from the mine kept Ferryhill railway station very busy. The railway station closed in the Beeching cuts. The demolition contractors for the colliery in the 1970s also demolished the residual station building structures. The area has been in economic decline since the mine and the railway station closed.

== The mine and local culture ==
Mineworkers contributed towards supporting the town band, cricket team, bowls team and many more activities that were associated with the colliery at that time. Without their support so many organisations and activities would never have existed. The legacy lives on with the following:

=== Welfare institute ===
Mainsforth Colliery Welfare Institute, Ferryhill Station, County Durham is a venue for arts music and theatre. It is currently home to the Mainsforth Community Centre.

=== Art ===
Norman Cornish redeployed to Mainsforth Colliery in 1962 from the Dean and Chapter Colliery before its closure. It was in this period that Norman painted the celebrated ‘Durham Miners' Gala Mural’.

=== Music ===
Ferryhill Town Band

The miners of the Mainsforth Colliery formed the Ferryhill Town Band in 1909. (This was initially named the Mainsforth Colliery Brass Band). In the early years the miners contributed 1/2d per week to support the band.

=== Sport ===
Cricket

Miners from the nearby Mainsforth colliery founded the Mainsforth Cricket Club in the early 1900s.

Bowls

Mainsforth Bowling Club was first established in the early 1900s to play lawn bowls, with the majority of players also working at the pit.

== Wartime ==
War memorial

In 1925, a war memorial that erected to commemorate those men who worked for the Mainsforth Colliery officially opened.

War Memorial Cottage, Lough House Bank/Mainsforth Road, Ferryhill Station (Ferryhill) is Grade II listed and has a polished marble plaque securely attached to the front wall.

The plaque is rectangular grey marble, topped by curved moulded cornice. The centre contains a carved laurel wreath surrounded by the inscription: MAINSFORTH COLLIERY AND FERRYHILL STATION, WAR MEMORIAL, 1914–1919. Below, three columns of text list the names of all those who died and beneath that is inscribed: THEIR NAME LIVETH FOREVER.

Bevin Boys

During the Second World War conscripts worked the mine. The Bevin Boys were based at a camp established off Dean Road at the southern edge of Ferryhill, near the A167.

== The colliery area today ==
=== Current land usage ===
Much of the former colliery area is now a Durham County Council Wood.

In 1974 land which is part of the former site of Mainsforth Colliery was conveyed to the then Sedgefield District Council before being transferred in 1998 to Ferryhill Town Council, who maintain a park and sports complex on the site.

Mainsforth Sports Complex

The facilities on offer at Mainsforth Sports Complex include:

- Cricket field with pavilion - this is run by Mainsforth Cricket and Social Club Mainsforth CC. In recent years the cricket ground has played host to many representative games involving Durham County Cricket Club, and is regarded as one of the best in the county with six teams currently playing for the club as well as youth teams.
- Bowling green with pavilion - this is run by Mainsforth Bowls Club Mainsforth Bowls Club. Currently Mainsforth is home to five different teams with each taking part in various leagues in the county, including the Durham District, South West Durham and Rural Leagues.
- Football field with changing rooms (inside bowls pavilion) - currently home to one team.
- Play equipment for younger children and picnic area.

There is also the opportunity to take countryside walks. A pathway leads to the Durham County Council owned fishing pond which is leased to the Ferryhill and District Angling Club.

More details of the facility are available from

Light Industrial usage

A number of small businesses operate from part of the site.

Potential housing

An area of the former mine site has been granted outline permission for housing development, despite objections from local residents.

=== Mineral extraction ===
Mineral extraction is still a key industry for the area. The nearby Thrislington Quarry provides sand and dolomite (magnesian limestone). The colliery site and the quarry are adjacent to the Thrislington Plantation. The quarry is destined to become a landfill site.

=== Science ===
Flooded mine works

The flooded mine works have been studied and the mine has provided a case study of mine water quality deterioration.

Ecological study

Ecological reports commissioned for planning applications on the site have shown that the area is biodiverse. link and reference to follow.
