= Guillaume du Vair =

French author and lawyer (1556–1621)

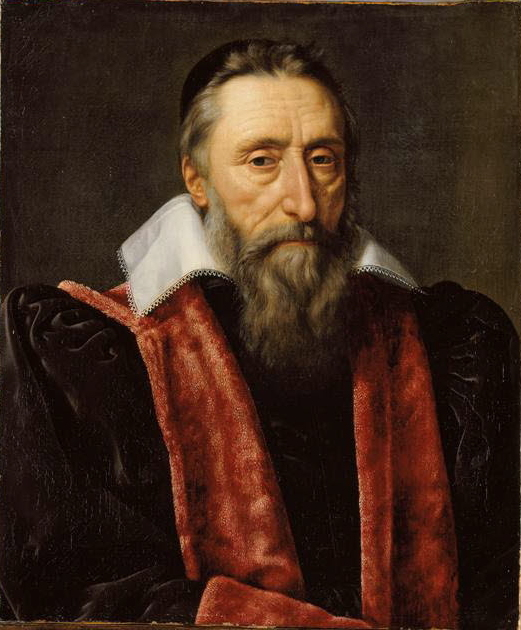
- Born: 7 March 1556; Paris, France
- Died: 3 August 1621 (aged 65); Tonneins, France
- Occupations: Author and lawyer

Guillaume du Vair (7 March 1556 – 3 August 1621) was a French bishop, author, lawyer, Magistrate of the Parliament and Keeper of the Seals of France under French king Louis XIII.

== Life ==
Du Vair was born in Paris. After taking holy orders, he exercised only legal functions for most of his career. However, from 1617 until his death he was Bishop of Lisieux. His reputation is that of a lawyer, a statesman and a man of letters. In 1584, he became counsellor of the parlement of Paris, and as deputy for Paris to the Estates of the League he pronounced his most famous politico-legal discourse, an argument nominally for the Salic law, but in reality directed against the alienation of the crown of France to the Spanish infanta, which was advocated by the extreme Leaguers. King Henry IV of France acknowledged his services by entrusting him with a special commission as magistrate at Marseille, and made him Master of Requests.

In 1595, Vair published his treatise De l'éloquence française et des raisons pour quoi elle est demeurée si basse, in which he criticizes the orators of his day, adding examples from the speeches of ancient orators, in translations which reproduce the spirit of the originals. He was sent to England in 1596 with the marshal de Bouillon to negotiate a league against Spain; in 1599 he became first president of the parlement of Provence (Aix-en-Provence); and in 1603 was appointed to the see of Marseille, which he soon resigned in order to resume the presidency. In 1616 he received the highest promotion open to a French lawyer and became keeper of the seals. He died at Tonneins (Lot-et-Garonne).

Both as speaker and writer he was highly regarded. Like other political lawyers of the time, Du Vair studied philosophy. The most famous of his treatises are La Philosophie morale des Stoiques, translated into English by Thomas James (1598) and Charles Cotton (1664); De la constance et consolation ès calamités publiques, which was composed during the siege of Paris in 1589, and applied the Stoic doctrine to present misfortunes; and La Sainte philosophie, in which religion and philosophy are intimately connected.

Pierre Charron drew freely on these and other works of Du Vair. Ferdinand Brunetière points out the analogy of Du Vair's position with that afterwards developed by Blaise Pascal, and sees in him the ancestor of Jansenism. Du Vair had a great indirect influence on the development of style in French, for in the south of France he made the acquaintance of François de Malherbe, who conceived a great admiration for Du Vair's writings. The reformer of French poetry learned much from the treatise De l'éloquence française, to which the counsels of his friend were no doubt added.

Du Vair died at Tonneins, and his works were published in folio at Paris in 1641.
