= Howard Linskey =

English novelist (born 1967)

- Born: 16 May 1967 (age 59)
- Occupation: Author
- Writing career
- Language: English
- Period: 2011–present
- Genres: Fiction, crime, thriller
- Website: howardlinskey.com

Howard Linskey (born 16 May 1967) is a British novelist and former journalist. He is best known for the David Blake crime fiction series. This series and his subsequent crime novels are set in the northeast of England. Linskey is also the author of two historical thrillers set during the Second World War.

== Early life ==
Linskey grew up in Ferryhill, County Durham, England, where he attended Ferryhill Comprehensive School. In 1989, he graduated with a degree in history and politics from the University of Huddersfield before working as a bartender, catering manager, and marketing manager for a celebrity chef, as well as a variety of sales and account management roles.

In 1993, Linskey completed a postgraduate diploma in journalism, after which he worked for several regional newspapers in the northwest of England, including for the Warrington Guardian. He was also a regular contributor to Newcastle United F.C. fanzine The Mag and was the English Premier League football correspondent for a Malaysian magazine.

== Writing career ==
Linskey's debut novel, The Drop, was published by No Exit Press in 2011. It is a crime thriller set in Newcastle upon Tyne, England, featuring the character David Blake. The book received favourable reviews and was selected by Peter Millar, writing in the London Times, as one of his top five crime thrillers of 2011. It was later optioned for television by film producer David Barron. The Drop was published in Germany by Droemer Knaur in 2014 as Gangland (ISBN 978-3426513972).

Two further titles followed in what subsequently became known as the David Blake series: The Damage (2012), chosen by The Times as one of its top books of the summer; and The Dead (2013), the final book in the series. Both books broke into the top five Amazon Kindle chart and all three titles in the series were recorded as audio books.

Linskey then started a new series of crime mystery novels, again set in the northeast of England, featuring journalists Tom Carney and Helen Norton and police detective Ian Bradshaw. Published by Penguin Books, the series opened with No Name Lane (2015), followed by Behind Dead Eyes (2016), The Search (2017), and The Chosen Ones (2018).

In addition to crime fiction, Linskey has also authored two novels set during the Second World War: Hunting the Hangman (2017), based on the assassination of Reinhard Heydrich, and Ungentlemanly Warfare (2019), relating to a Special Operations Executive operation in 1943.

Linskey was one of the featured authors in the 2017 CBS Reality television series Written In Blood. Linskey's episode covered Moors murderer Ian Brady.

== Personal life ==
Linskey lives in Hertfordshire with his wife Alison and daughter Erin. He is a lifelong supporter of Newcastle United F.C.

== Publications ==
Title	Publisher	Publication date	ISBN
The Drop	No Exit Press	21 April 2011	978-1842433942
The Damage	No Exit Press	26 April 2012	978-1842435021
The Dead	No Exit Press	25 April 2013	978-1842439623
No Name Lane	Penguin Books	12 March 2015	978-0718180324
Behind Dead Eyes	Penguin Books	19 May 2016	978-0718180348
The Search	Penguin Books	4 May 2017	978-0718180362
Hunting the Hangman	No Exit Press	25 May 2017	978-1843449508
The Chosen Ones	Penguin Books	14 June 2018	978-1405933148
Ungentlemanly Warfare	No Exit Press	6 June 2019	978-0857303202
Alice Teale Is Missing	Penguin Books	23 January 2020	978-1405933322
Don't Let Him In	Penguin Books	13 May 2021	978-1405945097
The Inheritance	Penguin Books	29 September 2022	978-1405945110
The Bodyguard	Orion	1 September 2022	978-1841885407
Players of Death	Canelo	30 January 2025	9798217269532
