= Ferryhill =

Town and civil parish in County Durham, England

Coordinates: 54.69°N 1.55°W

- Town
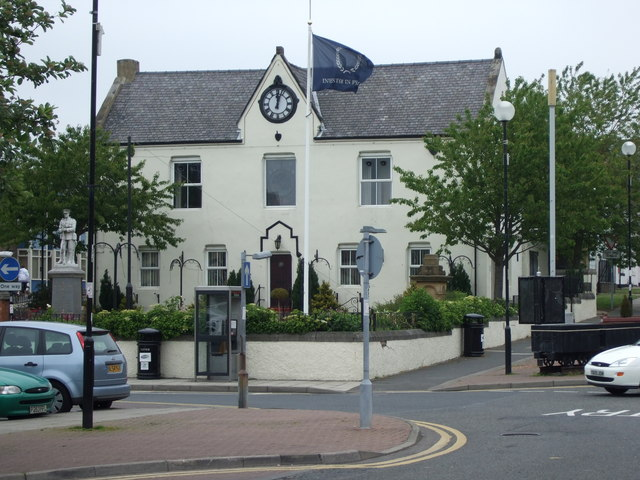
- Ferryhill Town Hall

- Location within County Durham
- Population: 8,942 (2011 census)
- OS grid reference: NZ291326
- Unitary authority: Durham
- Ceremonial county: Durham
- Region: North East
- Country: England
- Sovereign state: United Kingdom
- Post town: FERRYHILL
- Postcode district: DL17
- Dialling code: 01740
- Police: Durham
- Fire: County Durham and Darlington
- Ambulance: North East
- UK Parliament: Newton Aycliffe and Spennymoor
- Website: ferryhill.gov.uk

Ferryhill is a town and civil parish in County Durham, England, with an estimated population in 2018 of 8,857. The town grew in the 1900s around the coal mining industry. The last mine officially closed in 1968. It is located between the towns of Bishop Auckland, Newton Aycliffe, Sedgefield, Shildon, Spennymoor and the cathedral city of Durham.

== Geography ==
Ferryhill sits on the western edge of the Ferryhill Gap, a natural gateway in limestone escarpment that outcrops on the Eastern Durham Plateau. The main settlement lies along the 'SW-NE' ridge, with later developments made to the south of the ridge.

Ferryhill lies on the medieval Great North Road, which used to be the A1. It was bypassed when the Ferryhill Cut was excavated in 1923. The road is now the A167, which leads to Durham and Newcastle-upon-Tyne to the North, and to Darlington in the south.

Ferryhill Carrs is a Site of Special Scientific Interest and designated local nature reserve at the Eastern edge of the town.

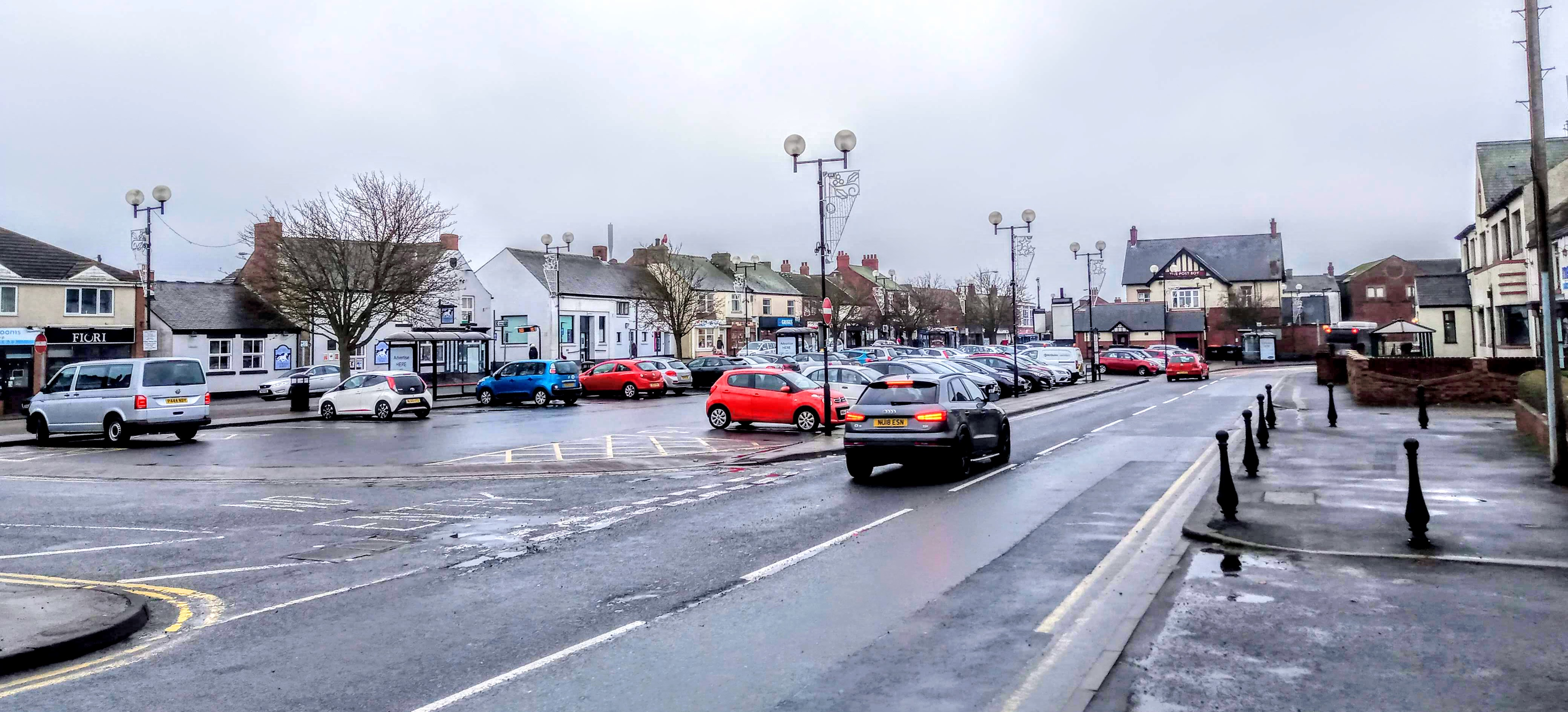
Ferryhill, County Durham

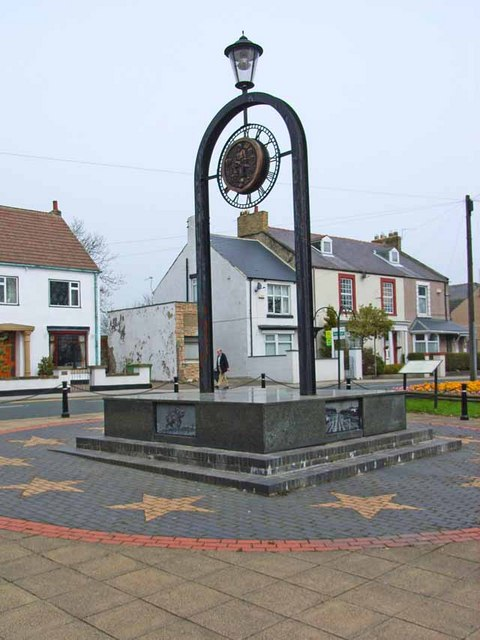
The Beacon of Europe

=== Sections of Ferryhill ===
- Dean Bank
- Ferryhill Station
- Ferryhill railway station
- Chilton Lane
- The Carrs
- Mainsforth Colliery

=== Neighbouring settlements ===
- Spennymoor
- Kirk Merrington
- Chilton, County Durham
- Mainsforth
- Bishop Middleham
- West Cornforth

== History ==
The name Ferryhill is a shortened form of 'Ferry on the Hill'. Ferry derives from the Old English fergen meaning 'mountain'.

Ferryhill Town Hall, a prominent landmark in the town, was completed in 1867.

== Facilities ==
Ferryhill has a weekly Friday market in the town centre marketplace, run by Ferryhill Town Council. There have been many improvements to the town, including the award-winning Mainsforth sports complex, Surtees Doorstep Green, King George V rec corridor improvements at Ferryhill Station, new Town Centre public toilets paid for by funding from Sedgefield Borough Councillors and is now run by Ferryhill Town Council and a youth cafe for the town's young people.

Part of Dean Bank Park has been used to enhance sporting facilities, and the remainder has recently been the subject to consultation by the Town Council. The final plans include a £70,000 play area for which funding has been secured from the lottery, a £50,000 MUGA for which funding is being sought by the Friends of Dean Bank Park but has since been turned down due to it not been a community led group. Also funding has been applied for £50,000 of playbuilder facilities. In addition to this the new park will include a viewing tower, BMX/skatepark, new planting areas to walk and relax as well as a performance arena.

The Town has many community events including an annual summer gala, Christmas market, parading of miners banners, vintage car rally, art and photography exhibitions and many more, all of which are organised jointly by the Town Council and the 2000 Committee.

== Governance ==
An electoral ward of the same name as the town exists. This ward has differences to the parish of Ferryhill, and has a total population taken at the 2011 Census of 8,942.

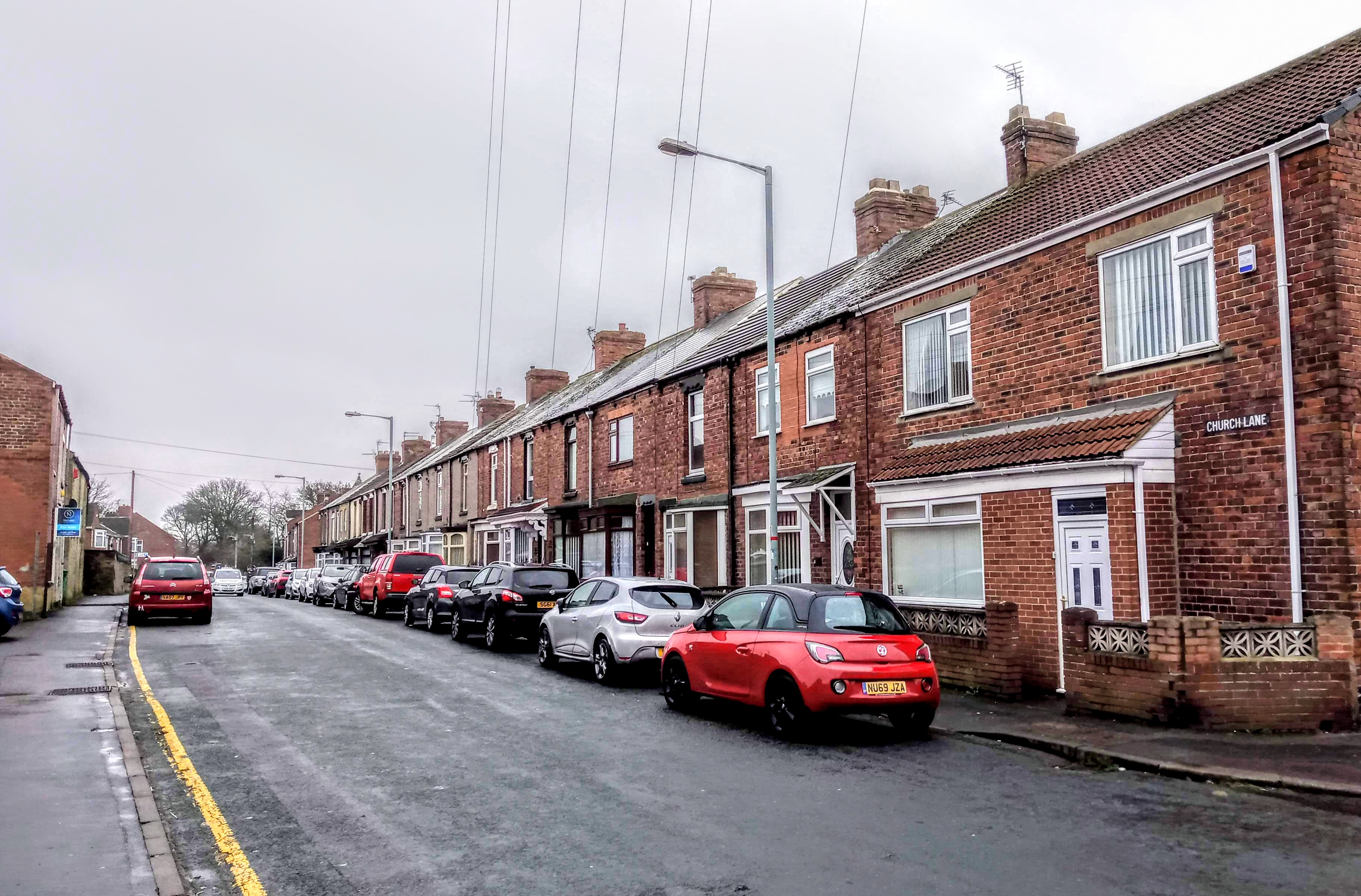
Church Lane, Ferryhill

== Newspaper ==
Ferryhill has a free community newspaper, The Ferryhill and Chilton Chapter Community Newspaper, which is distributed to all households in Ferryhill and the neighbouring community of Chilton. The paper has its own website where the latest issue, and archive issues going back to 2005, can be viewed.

== Education ==
There are four primary schools in Ferryhill: Broom Cottages Primary School, Dean Bank Primary School, Cleves Cross Primary School, and Ferryhill Station Primary School.

Ferryhill has one secondary school, Ferryhill School. It was a former specialist Business and Enterprise College. It has also been known as Ferryhill Comprehensive School.

== Sport ==
Over £1 million in funding was secured by Ferryhill Town Youth, in partnership with Ferryhill Town Council, to develop a new sports facility for the town.

It includes new changing rooms, a recreation area, and six football pitches in Dean Bank Park and the adjacent former Ferryhill Athletic football ground.

The facilities are to be used by the town's thriving football clubs, Ferryhill Town Youth in particular. The nearby Dean Bank Park is maintained by Ferryhill Town Council, and belongs to the welfare fund for the former Dean and Chapter Colliery of 1968.

The Town Council purchased the former Ferryhill Athletic ground at auction in 2004, which was then provided to improve recreation facilities in the area, after the land could not be sold on.

== Notable people ==
- Sid Chaplin (1916–1986) – novelist and poet who lived in Ferryhill from 1941 to 1953
- John McManners (1916–2006) – clergyman and religious historian
- Jack Scott (1923–2008) – weatherman for the BBC, ITV and Channel 4 for 20 Years
- Alan White (1949–2022) – drummer for the Plastic Ono Band and Yes
- Eric Gates (born 1955) – footballer who played twice for England as well as Ipswich, Sunderland and Carlisle
- Phill Nixon (1956–2013) – darts player, World Championship Runner Up in 2007
- Pauline Murray (born 1958) – lead singer of punk rock band Penetration
- Fred Barber (born 1963) – footballer who played over 400 Football League appearances
- Howard Linskey (born 1967) – crime novelist
