= The Carrs =

Protected area in County Durham, England

- Location within County Durham
- Location: MAGiC MaP
- Nearest town: Ferryhill
- Coordinates: 54°41′20″N 1°32′2″W
- Area: 12.9 ha (32 acres)
- Established: 1988
- Governing body: Natural England
- Website: The Carrs SSSI

The Carrs is a Site of Special Scientific Interest in County Durham, England. It is situated on the eastern outskirts of Ferryhill, between the town and the East Coast Main Line railway.

The Carrs is an area of wetland that has formed in the low-lying parts of a glacial meltwater channel. A large part of the site is open water, which is fringed by fen vegetation. Woodland and calcareous grassland cover the steep slopes on the western side of the site, where there is also a disused quarry.

The site's importance lies mainly in its areas of open water and fen vegetation, which are scarce habitats in lowland County Durham. There is also a small area of equally scarce magnesian limestone grassland, in which blue moor-grass, Sesleria albicans, and glaucous sedge, Carex flacca, are dominant.

The site adjoins the Ferryhill Carrs Local Nature Reserve, which extends to the north, alongside the railway line.
