= Ferryhill Town Hall =

Municipal building in Ferryhill, County Durham, England

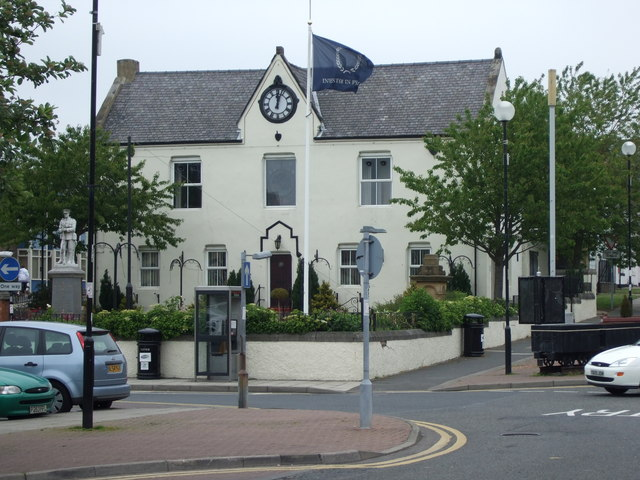
- Ferryhill Town Hall

- Shown in County Durham
- 54.6896°N 1.5547°W
- Location: Chapel Terrace, Ferryhill

History
- Built: 1867

Site notes
- Architectural style: Neoclassical style

Ferryhill Town Hall is a municipal building in Chapel Terrace, Ferryhill, County Durham, England. The structure accommodates the offices and meeting place of Ferryhill Town Council.

== History ==
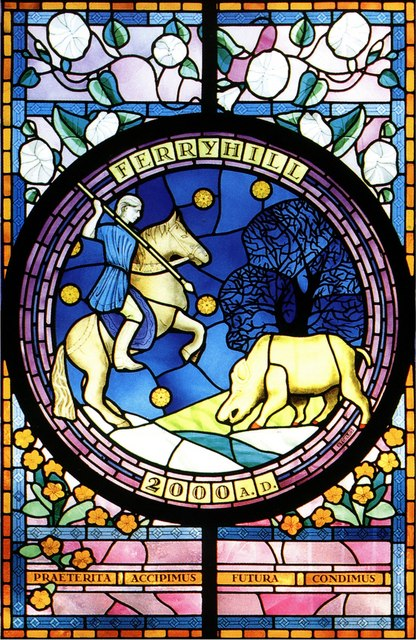
Stained glass window in the town hall

The building was financed by public subscription and commissioned to provide a library, reading room and concert hall for the town. The site chosen, at the east end of the Market Square, had been occupied by the old parish church which was completed in 1829, but demolished in 1851, in anticipation of the construction of a new parish church in Church Lane in 1853.

The new building was designed in the neoclassical style, built in rubble masonry at a cost of £700 and was completed in 1867. The design involved a symmetrical main frontage facing onto Chapel Terrace. The central bay featured a doorway with a pointed hood mould on the ground floor, a cross-window on the first floor and a small pediment containing a clock above. There were four more cross-windows in the outer bays on the ground floor and two more cross-windows in the outer bays on the first floor. At roof level, there was a central roof lantern formed by louvres surmounted by a pyramid-shaped roof. The architectural historian, Nikolaus Pevsner, described the building as "very modest".

A memorial to commemorate the life of a miner, William Walton, who died saving two boys from electrocution at Dean Bank, was unveiled to the southwest of the town hall in April 1908. A war memorial, in the form of a soldier standing on a pedestal, intended to commemorate the lives of local service personnel who had died during the First World War, was unveiled in front of the town hall in the presence of Brigadier-General Conyers Surtees in February 1925. A second war memorial, in the former of a celtic cross, intended to commemorate the lives of service personnel from the nearby village of East Howle who had died during the First World War, was unveiled to the northwest of the town hall in the presence of Major Joseph Aloysius Louis Downey in 1930.

On 6 October 1936, 60 miners, who were traveling south to London as part of the Jarrow March, stayed overnight in the town hall. Around the middle of the 20th century, alterations were carried out which involved the removal of the roof lantern and the re-facing of the building with cement render.

In the 1960s, the fire service, which had operated from a fire station of the south side of the town hall, relocated to a new fire station in Darlington Road, and the library room in the town hall was converted into a conference room, after the library service relocated to a dedicated library building in North Street at around the same time. Following local government re-organisation in 1974, the building became the offices and meeting place of Ferryhill Town Council.

A stained glass window designed by Tony Steele, depicting Sir Roger de Fery confronting the "Brawn of Brancepeth" (a wild boar), was installed in the town hall to commemorate the new millennium in 2000. A 19th-century plaque, recovered from Cleves Cross Farm, which commemorated the death of the boar, was subsequently installed below the stained glass window.
