= James Raine (Chancellor) =

British historian and cleric (1830–1896)

Rev Canon James Raine DCL
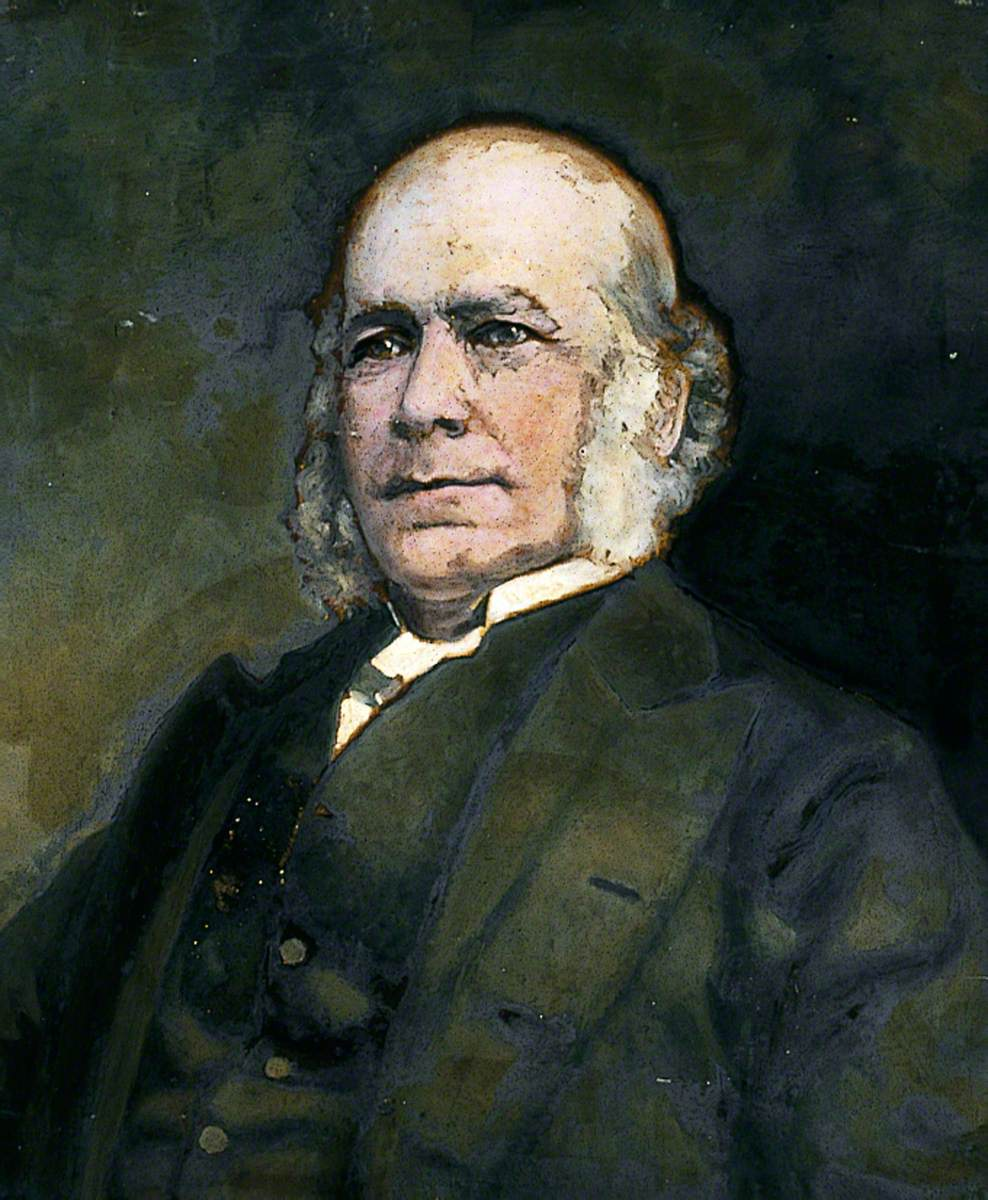
- The Canon Raine, painted posthumously in 1906 by Henry Keyworth Raine
- Born: 1830; Durham, England
- Died: 1896 (aged 65–66)
- Education: University of Durham
- Occupations: Clergyman; Antiquarian
- Spouse: Annie Keyworth
- Parent(s): James Raine and Margaret Peacock
- Offices held: Vicar; Rector; Canon; Chancellor

James Raine (1830–1896) was a British antiquarian and ecclesiast. He was a Canon and Chancellor of York Minster.

== Biography ==
=== Early life and education ===
Raine was born in Durham, England, and was the son of James Raine and Margaret Peacock. He lived with his parents and three sisters (including Margaret Raine Hunt) in Crook Hall, Durham. He was educated at the Cathedral School in Durham and the University of Durham, from which he graduated in 1851.

=== Clergyman ===
From 1857 to 1868 Raine was the vicar of St Lawrence's Church, York. He left this role to be the Rector of both St Michael's Church, Spurriergate and St Crux, Pavement, retiring from the former in 1885 and retaining the latter until his death. He was appointed Canon of York Minster in 1866 and Chancellor in 1891.

A stained glass window in All Saints' Church, Pavement is dedicated to Raine. It depicts Saints Aidan of Lindisfarne, Paulinus (first Bishop of York) and Cuthbert (holding St Oswald's head).

=== Antiquarian ===
Raine was an Honorary Curator of Antiquities at the Yorkshire Philosophical Society (who operated the Yorkshire Museum) from 1873, and was appointed a Vice-President of the society in 1876. At the time of his death in 1896 he was also a Trustee of the museum. He donated several objects to the Yorkshire Museum throughout his life. Raine served as the honorary librarian of York Minster. He was the secretary of the Surtees Society from 1855 to 1895. His father had also served in this role from 1834–1849.

Raine was awarded an honorary Doctor of Civil Law from Durham University in 1882 in recognition of his archaeological work.

=== Family ===
Raine was married to Annie Keyworth. Together they had nine children. Their son Angelo also served as Rector of St Crux from 1937–1956. A portrait of James Raine was produced by another son, Henry Keyworth Raine in 1906 for the Yorkshire Museum. It was transferred to the York Art Gallery in 1971.

== Select publications ==
- Raine, J. 1875. " An account of several Roman inscriptions discovered during the Railway Excavations", Annual Report of the Yorkshire Philosophical Society for 1875. 1–5.
- Raine, James ed., 1879–1894. The Historians of the Church of York and its Archbishops, 3 volumes
- Raine, J. 1880. "Curious discovery made in the garden of St. Mary's Convent, near Micklegate Bar", Annual Report of the Yorkshire Philosophical Society for 1880. 48.
- Raine, J. 1893. Historic Towns: York.
- Raine, J. 1884. "Recent discoveries of Roman remains at York", The Academy (7 July 1884), 35.

Professional and academic associations
Preceded by John Pedder	Secretary of the Surtees Society; 1854–95	Succeeded by William Brown
