= Robert Surtees (antiquarian) =

English historian and antiquary (1779-1834)

- Born: 1 April 1779 South Bailey, Durham
- Died: 14 February 1834 (aged 54) Mainsforth Hall, County Durham
- Education: Kepier School; Houghton-le-Spring
- Alma mater: Christ Church, Oxford
- Notable works: The History and Antiquities of the County Palatine of Durham
- Spouse: Anne Robinson (m. 1807)
- Relatives: Charles Surtees

Robert Surtees (1 April 1779 – 13 February 1834) was a British historian and antiquary of his native County Durham.

== Early life ==
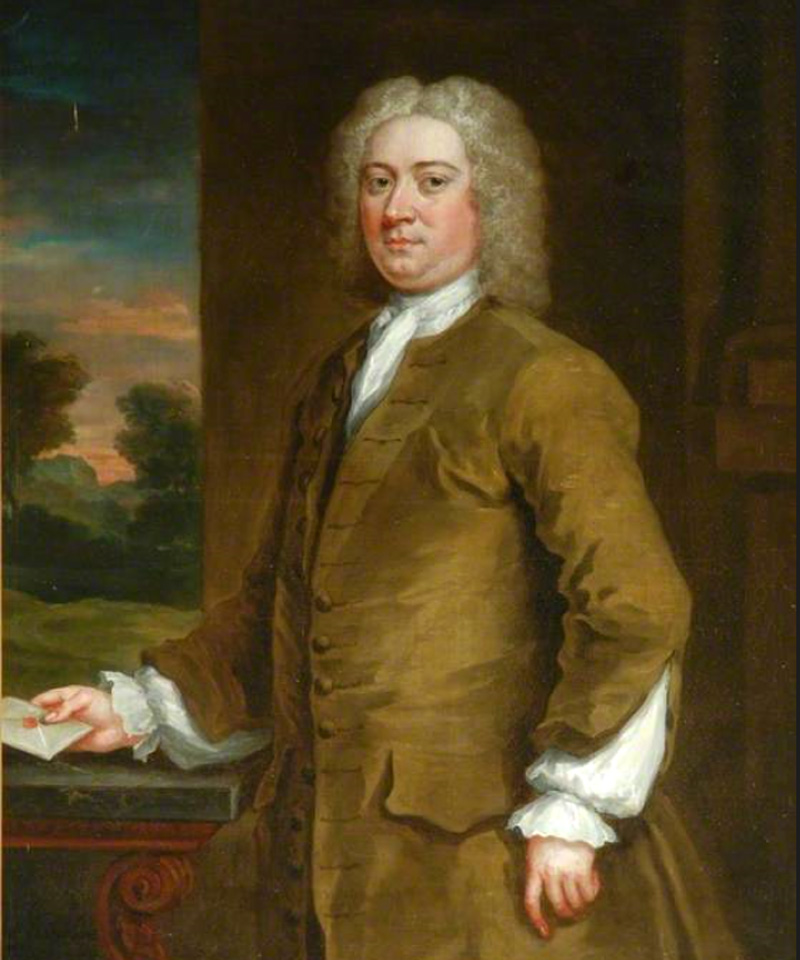
Surtees maternal grandfather, Robert Surtees of Redworth Hall.

Surtees was born in South Bailey, Durham on 1 April 1779. He was the only surviving child of Dorothy Surtees (d. 1797) and Robert Surtees of Mainsforth (d. 1802), who were first cousins.

His maternal grandparents were Robert Surtees of Redworth Hall, and the former Dorothy Lambton (second daughter of Thomas Lambton of Hardwick). His aunt, Jane Surtees (co-heiresses of their father Robert Surtees), also married a first cousin, Lt. Crosier Surtees, who died in 1803 when returning from a banquet with Lord Barnard at Raby Castle when he drunkenly fell into the moors and froze to death. They were grandparents of Henry Surtees, who inherited Redworth Hall, and Charles Surtees, who eventually inherited Mainsforth Hall.

He was educated at Kepier School, Houghton-le-Spring, and later at Christ Church, Oxford, graduating with a B.A. degree in 1800 and a M.A. degree in 1803. In school, he befriended Reginald Heber, later The Right Reverend Bishop of Calcutta.

== Career ==
Surtees' The History and Antiquities of the County Palatine of Durham

In 1802, upon the death of his father, he inherited the family estate including Mainsforth Hall. Although a student of law he never practised as a lawyer, and instead devoted himself to the study of literature and antiquities. By 1804, Surtees had begun collecting material for what was to become his monumental county history, The History of Durham.

He was a studious and sensitive man who did not always have good health. He was hospitable at Mainsforth, and guests included Sir Walter Scott, with whom Surtees frequently corresponded. Three ballads authored by Surtees, 'The Death of Featherstonehaugh', 'Barthram's Dirge' and 'Lord Ewrie' were included in Scott's Minstrelsy of the Scottish Border (1802).

By 1816, the first volume of The History and Antiquities of the County Palatine of Durham was published ("compiled from original records preserved in public repositories and private collections by Robert Surtees"). Two further volumes followed and a final volume was published posthumously in 1840. The work covers much of the county but does not include Weardale, Teesdale, the Aucklands, Brancepeth, or Durham Castle or Cathedral. James Raine compiled The History and Antiquities of North Durham (2 vols, 1830 and 1852) to supply the need.

== Personal life ==
On 23 June 1807, he married Anne Robinson (b. 1785), a daughter of Ralph Robinson of Middle Herrington, Durham, but they had no children. Christian faith was central in Surtees's life and he regularly worshipped at Bishop Middleham parish church.

Never in good health, Surtees complained of a cold in January 1834, complications developed and he died on 13 February 1834, with his wife at his bedside. He was buried in Bishop Middleham churchyard, and a monument to him was later erected there. His wife Anne survived him, living in Mainsforth until her death in March 1868.

== Legacy ==
Immediately following Surtees' death, in May 1834, James Raine and other former friends established the Surtees Society to honour his memory and continue his work.
