= The Philobiblon =

14th-century text by Richard de Bury

The Philobiblon, or The Love of Books, is a collection of essays concerning the acquisition, preservation, and organization of books, written by the medieval English bibliophile Richard de Bury shortly before his death in 1345. The purposes of the Philobiblon were "to encourage the pursuit of learning contained in books; to justify the time and money [de Bury] spent on them; and to give practical advice for the formation of running of a library." Written in Latin, as was the custom of the day, it is separated into twenty chapters, each covering a different topic relating to book collecting.

Whether or not de Bury was the actual author of the Philobiblon has been disputed. The controversy began because Bishop de Bury's biographer Chambres neglects to mention the book at all in de Bury's biography. It was once thought that de Bury's chaplain, Robert Holkot, was the author and a substantial body of evidence was gathered to argue that this was the case. Today, however, most experts agree that the work is indeed de Bury's, chiefly due to the revealing and autobiographical nature of the book.

== Background ==
According to one scholar, the Philobiblon is "one of the longest extant medieval texts on the subject of library management." In it are several innovations such as the practices for circulation control among the students of Durham College, Oxford, using at times an open-stack rather than the dominant closed-stack system. Fifteenth-century scholars cited the work often. Thomas à Kempis, author of the devotional book The Imitation of Christ, borrowed a whole chapter of the Philobiblon for one of his works, and Mathaus Hummel read from it during the opening of the University of Freiburg.

The Philobiblon references the Vulgate version of the Bible so frequently that these quotations make up approximately one-fourteenth of the entire book.

As to de Bury's legacy, it was said about the Philobiblon: "it is the sole memorial of one who loved books so much in an age and country that loved them so little."

== Bibliography ==
Originally written in 1345, the Philobiblon has been printed numerous times since. The first printing was in Cologne in 1473, the second at Speyer in 1483, and the third in Paris in 1500. Nearly a hundred years passed before it was printed again in England by Thomas James, Bodley's Librarian, in 1599. It was then printed in Germany again in 1610, 1614, and 1674. These editions relied upon the original Cologne edition of 1473. Later, in 1703, it was printed by J. A. Schmidt in a supplement for a treatise on libraries. It was then printed in English anonymously in 1832. Later, a French translation, along with the Latin text, appeared in 1856. It was first printed in the United States in 1861. Since 1888, it has been reprinted nearly twenty times. The edition of 1888 (London: Kegan Paul, Trench, & Co.) was the work of Ernest C. Thomas who spent 15 years establishing the text and translating it into English. His translation was published again in London in 1902 by Alexander Moring.

== List of chapters ==
Prologue

1. That the Treasure of Wisdom is chiefly contained in Books
2. The degree of Affection that is properly due to Book
3. What we are to think of the price in the buying of books
4. The Complaint of Books against the Clergy already promoted
5. The Complaint of Books against the Possessioners
6. The Complaint of Books against the Mendicants
7. The Complaint of Books against Wars
8. Of the numerous Opportunities we have had of collecting a store of books
9. How although we preferred the Works of the Ancients we have not condemned the Studies of the Moderns
10. Of the Gradual Perfecting of Books
11. Why we have preferred Books of Liberal Learning to Books of Law
12. Why we have caused Books of Grammar to be so diligently prepared
13. Why we have not wholly neglected the Fables of the Poets
14. Who ought to be special Lovers of Books
15. Of the advantages of the love of Books
16. That it is meritorious to write new Books and to renew the old
17. Of showing due Propriety in the Custody of Books
18. Showeth that we have collected so great Store of Books for the common Benefit of Scholars and not only for our own Pleasure
19. Of the Manner of lending all our Books to Students
20. An Exhortation to Scholars to requite us by pious Prayers

== Synopsis ==
Prologue
In the Prologue, de Bury recounts in a flourish of language why and how he came to write the book, ending with:

And this treatise (divided into twenty chapters) will clear the love we have had for books from the charge of excess, will expound the purpose of our intense devotion, and will narrate more clearly than light all the circumstances of our undertaking. And because it principally treats of the love of books, we have chose after the fashion of the ancient Romans fondly to name it by a Greek word, Philobiblon.

Chapter 1: That the Treasure of Wisdom is chiefly contained in Books

In libris mortuos quasi vivos invenio

In chapter 1, de Bury explains how knowledge and wisdom is passed down from generation to generation in books. "In books I find the dead as if they were alive; in books I forsee things to come; in books warlike affairs are set forth; from books come forth the laws of peace".

2. The degree of Affection that is properly due to Books

Liborum necesse est se faciat amatorem.

Chapter 2 describes the relationshipship between riches, truth, and love and how all three relate to books. "Whoever therefore claims to be zealous of truth, of happiness, of wisdom or knowledge, aye even of the faith, must needs become a lover of books."

3. What we are to think of the price in the buying of books

Nullam videlicet debere caristiam hominem impedire ab emptione librorum

In chapter 3, de Bury argues that the value of a book is beyond what it costs to produce it. Instead, he argues that the price of a book should be whatever the purchaser can afford, unless he can purchase it at a lower price. For de Bury, books contain wisdom and truth and, therefore, they should be purchased at all reasonable costs. "[N]o dearness of price ought to hinder a man from buying books".

4. The Complaint of Books against the Clergy already promoted

Caeterum iam de clericis, qui sunt vasa virtutis, loquamur.

One of the longest chapters in the Philobiblon, chapter 4 starts out disparaging those clerks and clergy who treat books, and the wisdom they contain, with disdain. Written from the vantage point of a book (as are chapters 5 through 7), he states that "ye let go the lot of God which ye had first assumed, becoming companions of thieves." He then goes on to describe those clergy who are "vessels of virtue" as those who appreciate books. "Finally, by the knowledge of literature, we establish priests, bishops, cardinals, and the Pope, that all things in the ecclesiastical hierarchy may be fitly disposed". Here, de Bury is acknowledging that the Catholic Church, and many of the clergy in England, had for many years a distrust of non-liturgical books, especially the Greeks classics, which were deemed "pagan".

5. The Complaint of Books against the Possessioners

De quorum laboribus hodie in plerisque splendent monasteriis illa sacra gazophylacia, cherubicis libris plena.

In chapter 5, de Bury laments about the direction the monastic orders have taken. In previous times, monks were known for their love of books, and their devotion to both their creation and study. De Bury feels that monks have abandoned practice this and replaced quiet study with manual labor. "Flocks and fleece, crops and granaries, leeks and potherbs, drink and goblets, are nowadays the reading and study of the monks".

6. The Complaint of Books against the Mendicants

Tunc enim proculdubio libris et studio propensius vacaretis.

In chapter 6, de Bury describes the life of the religious mendicant, members of religious orders who rely upon charity and forgo all possessions. Here, de Bury argues that mendicants are too tempted by fine food, luxurious garments, and grand housing while books are considered superfluous. "And whatever they could steal from their famishing belly, or intercept from their half-covered body, they thought it the highest gain to spend in buying or correcting books." Here, as in the previous chapters, de Bury levels a strong indictment against the present status of his church in a way that is rarely seen prior to the Reformation.

7. The Complaint of Books against Wars

Vasa destruunt rationis

In the final chapter written from the perspective of a book, de Bury discusses the effect of war upon books and how many ancient and present texts were lost.

ALMIGHTY AUTHOR AND LOVER OF PEACE, scatter the nations that delight in war, which is above all plagues injurious to books. For wars being without the control of reason make a wild assault on everything they come across, and, lacking the check of reason they push on without discretion or distinction to destroy the vessels of reason.

8. Of the numerous Opportunities we have had of collecting a store of books

Fiebat ad nos desideratus accessus vasorum scientiae et volatus multifarious voluminum optimorum.

In his most revealing chapter, de Bury recounts how his position within the church and government of the Crown enabled him to obtain books through a sort of benign bribery.

And indeed while we filled various offices to the victorious Prince and splendidly triumphant King of England, Edward the Third from the Conquest—whose reign may the Almighty long and peacefully continue—first those about his court, but then those concerning the public affairs of his kingdom, namely the offices of Chancellor and Treasurer, there was afforded to us, in consideration of the royal favour, easy access for the purpose of freely searching the retreats of books. In fact, the fame of our love of them had been soon winged abroad everywhere, and we were reported to burn with such desire for books, and especially old ones, that it was more easy for any man to gain our favour by means of books than of money.

9. How although we preferred the Works of the Ancients we have not condemned the Studies of the Moderns

Antiquorum tamen examinatos labors securiori aviditate cupivimus perscrutari.

In chapter 9, we see in de Bury the general trend of the Catholic Church during this time to recognize the wisdom of the Greek classical writers such as Plato, Ovid, Euclid and others. For de Bury and others like him, "we have always desired with more undoubting avidity to investigate the well-tested labours of the ancients".

10. Of the Gradual Perfecting of Books

Quemadmodum namque in scriptoribus annalium considerare non-est difficile quod semper posterior praesupponit priorem.

Here de Bury argues that through books, society can be perpetually improved by building upon the knowledge of the previous generation. "What would Vergil, the chief poet among the Latins, have achieved, if he had not despoiled Theocritus, Lucretius, and Homer, and had not ploughed with their heifer?"

11. Why we have preferred Books of Liberal Learning to Books of Law

Sunt enim utilia, sicut scorpio in theriaca.

De Bury argues in this chapter that books of literature, science, and reason are better to study than a strict curriculum of law books. "Law indeed encourages rather than extinguishes the contentions of mankind."

12. Why we have caused Books of Grammar to be so diligently prepared

Cum liborum lectionibus foveremur assidue...

In chapter 12, the shortest chapter in the Philobiblion, de Bury argues that to full appreciate a book, a person should also study grammar. "[W]e noticed plainly how much the defective knowledge even of a single word hinders the understanding".

13. Why we have not wholly neglected the Fables of the Poets

In chapter 13, de Bury makes the observation that the true purpose of the ancient Greek fables was to make learning easy and more palpable for children and some adults. Therefore, as an educational tool, the ancient fables should still be studied and read. "Accordingly the wisdom of the ancients devised a remedy by which to entice the wanton minds of men by a kind of pious fraud, the delicate Minerva secretly lurking beneath the mask of pleasure."

14. Who ought to be special Lovers of Books

Per quod universis evidenter ostenditur nullum posse rempublicam debite regere sine libris.

According to de Bury, those who require specialized knowledge because of their position should be the one who appreciate books the most. "Wherefore princes and prelates, judges and doctors, and all other leaders of the commonwealth, as more than others they have need of wisdom, so more than others ought they to show zeal for the vessels of wisdom." (de Bury, p. 131) De Bury continues, "The history of the Greeks as well as Romans show that there were no famous princes among them who were devoid of literature."

15. Of the advantages of the love of Books

Montes scandimus, abyssorum voragines perscrutamur

In this chapter, de Bury again argues that the love of wisdom and the love of books are one and the same. "In books we climb mountains and scan the deepest gulfs of the abyss".

16. That it is meritorious to write new Books and to renew the old

Scribit iustos in libro viventium Deus ipse.

De Bury writes in chapter 16 that it is necessary for the church to write new tracts to protect itself against attack from "pagans and heretics". As proof of this, de Bury argues that the disciple Paul "Did more for building up the fabric of the Church by writing his holy epistles, than by preaching by word of mouth to Jews and Gentiles."

17. Of showing due Propriety in the Custody of Books

Longe namque diligentius librum quam calcium convenit conservari.

Like all bibliophiles, de Bury argues in this chapter that books must be cared for appropriately and gives a detailed account of how they should be used. "In the first place as to the opening and closing of books, let there be due moderation".

18. Showeth that we have collected so great Store of Books for the common Benefit of Scholars and not only for our own Pleasure

Ut ipsi libri et singuli eorundem communes fierent

In this chapter de Bury describes his plan for his library after his death. Although it was never to come to fruition, he wanted it to be known that he wished "to be found in perpetual charity a Hall" in Oxford University where he could donate his library.

19. Of the Manner of lending all our Books to Students

In primis enim libros omnes et singulos.

Here, de Bury describes the practices for circulation control among the students of the college, using at times an open-stack rather than the dominant closed-stack system. He also talks about such innovations as a catalogue, lending terms, and open lending in the case where there are duplicate books. For instance, he states that, under the appointment of the “Master,” five scholars would be placed in charge of the entire collection, with three “keepers” designated to lend books out; another three would be appointed annually to review the collection and ensure that all books were accounted for.

20. An Exhortation to Scholars to requite us by pious Prayers

De bury concludes the Philobiblon by stating that he does not deny that his collecting habits were not done out of vanity nor can he deny that he may have been zealous in his habits. However, in the end, he states that "the object of our love is honourable and our intention upright."
