= Richard de Bury =

English bishop, priest, teacher, writer, and bibliophile (1287-1345)

- Bishop of Durham
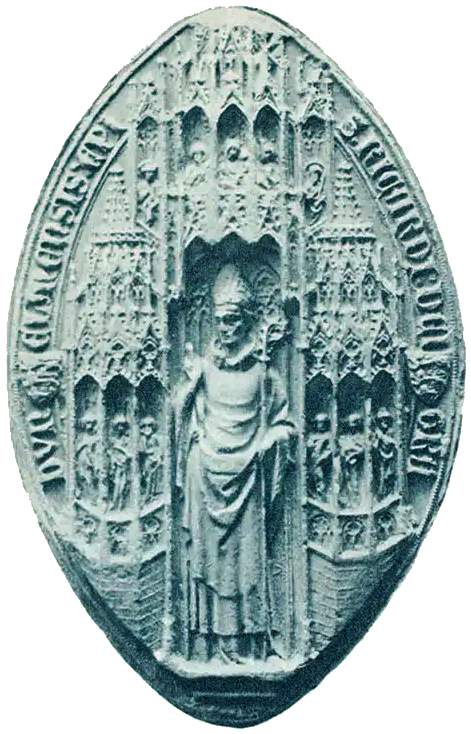
- Mandorla-shaped seal of Richard de Bury, Bishop of Durham. The Latin inscription is: S(igillum) Ricardi dei grat(ia) Dunelmensis epi(scopus) ("seal of Richard, by the grace of God Bishop of Durham"). Arms of King Edward III on either side
- Appointed: February 1333
- Term ended: 14 April 1345
- Predecessor: Lewis de Beaumont
- Successor: Thomas Hatfield

Personal details
- Born: 24 January 1287 near Bury St Edmunds, Suffolk, England
- Died: 14 April 1345 (aged 58) Bishop Auckland, Durham, England
- Denomination: Catholic

Richard de Bury (24 January 1287 (Note: The Dictionary of National Biography gives his birth year as 1281, but Ernest C. Thomas, writing in the introduction of the 1889 edition of Philobiblon, states that this is based on an incorrect reading.) – 14 April 1345), also known as Richard Aungerville or Aungervyle, was an English priest, teacher, bishop, writer, and bibliophile. He was a patron of learning and one of the first English collectors of books. He is chiefly remembered for his Philobiblon, written to inculcate in the clergy the pursuit of learning and the love of books. The Philobiblon is considered one of the earliest books to discuss librarianship in-depth. Completed shortly before de Bury's death in 1345, the book wasn't published until 1473, and this "little treatise" as he described it, has been regularly reprinted in every century following.

== Early life ==
Richard de Bury was born near Bury St Edmunds, Suffolk, the son of Sir Richard Aungervyle, who was descended from a knight who fought for William the Conqueror's men. Aungervyle settled in Leicestershire, and the family came into possession of the manor of Willoughby.

Sir Richard Aungervyle died when de Bury was a young boy. He was educated by his maternal uncle John de Willoughby, and after leaving the grammar school was sent to the University of Oxford, where he studied philosophy and theology. It is often reported that de Bury became a Benedictine monk at Durham Cathedral although several respected sources dispute this, as there is no evidence of him joining the Order. In fact, he was a priest and not a monk. He was made tutor to the future King Edward III whilst Earl of Chester (whom he would later serve as high chancellor and treasurer of England) and, according to Thomas Frognall Dibdin, inspired the prince with his own love of books.

== Administrator ==
Somehow he became involved in the intrigues preceding the deposition of King Edward II, and supplied Queen Isabella and her lover, Roger Mortimer, in Paris with money in 1325 from the revenues of Brienne, of which province he was treasurer. For some time he had to hide in Paris from the officers sent by Edward II to apprehend him. On the accession of Edward III his services were rewarded by rapid promotion. He was cofferer to the king (1327–28), treasurer of the wardrobe (1328–29) and afterwards Lord Privy Seal in 1329. The king repeatedly recommended him to the pope, and twice sent him, in 1330 and 1333, as ambassador to the papal court in exile at Avignon. On the first of these visits he met a fellow bibliophile, Petrarch, who records his impression of Aungerville as "not ignorant of literature and from his youth up curious beyond belief of hidden things". Petrarch asked him for information about Thule, but de Bury, who promised to reply when he was back at home among his books, never responded to repeated enquiries. Pope John XXII made him his principal chaplain, and presented him with a rochet in earnest of the next vacant bishopric in England.

== Bishop of Durham ==
During his absence from England de Bury was made Dean of Wells in February 1333. In September of the same year, he was made Bishop of Durham by the king, over-ruling the choice of the monks, who had elected and actually installed their sub-prior, Robert de Graystanes. In February 1334 de Bury was made Lord Treasurer, an appointment he exchanged later in the year for that of Lord Chancellor. He resigned the following year, and, after making arrangements for the protection of his northern diocese from an expected attack by the Scots, he proceeded in July 1336 to France to attempt a settlement of the claims in dispute between Edward and the French king. In the next year he served on three commissions for the defence of the northern counties. In June 1338 he was once again sent abroad on a peace mission, but within a month was waylaid by the approaching campaign.

De Bury travelled to Coblenz and met Louis IV, Holy Roman Emperor, and in the next year was sent to England to raise money. This seems to have been his last visit to the continent. In 1340 and 1342 he again tried to negotiate peace with the Scots, but afterwards left public politics to care for his diocese and accumulate a library. He sent far and wide in search of manuscripts, rescuing many volumes from the charge of ignorant and neglectful monks. He may sometimes have brought undue pressure to bear on the owners, for it is recorded that an abbot of St Albans bribed him with four valuable books, and that de Bury, who procured certain coveted privileges for the monastery, bought from him thirty-two other books for fifty pieces of silver, far less than their normal price. The record of his passion for books, his Philobiblon (Greek for "The Love of Books"), is a Latin treatise in praise of books. The Philobiblon was completed in 1344 and first printed in 1473. The most accurate and reliable English translation is by Ernest C. Thomas in 1888. Alfred Hessel describes the Philobiblon as "[t]he particular charm of the apology consist in fact that it contains sound library theory—though clothed in medieval garb". This remarkable piece of literature is one of the earliest books to discuss librarianship in-depth.

== Bibliophile ==
Richard de Bury gives an account of the unwearied efforts made by himself and his agents to collect books. He records his intention of founding a hall at Oxford, and in connection with it a library in which his books were to form the nucleus. He even details the dates to be observed for the lending and care of the books, and had already taken the preliminary steps for the foundation. The bishop died, however, in great poverty on 14 April 1345 at Bishop Auckland, and it seems likely that his collection was dispersed immediately after his death. Of it, the traditional account is that the books were sent to the Durham Benedictines Durham College, Oxford, which was shortly thereafter endowed by Bishop Hatfield, and that on the dissolution of the foundation by Henry VIII they were divided between Duke Humphrey of Gloucester's library, Balliol College, Oxford, and George Owen. However, surviving evidence in the rolls of Durham College suggests that the transfer never took place, and no library was built at Durham College until 70 years after de Bury's death. Only two of the volumes are known to be in existence; one is a copy of John of Salisbury's works in the British Museum, and the other some theological treatises by Anselm and others in the Bodleian.

The chief authority for the bishop's life is William de Chambre, printed in Wharton's Anglia Sacra, 1691, and in Historiae conelmensis scriptores tres, Surtees Soc., 1839, who describes him as an amiable and excellent man, charitable in his diocese, and the liberal patron of many learned men, among these being Thomas Bradwardine, afterwards Archbishop of Canterbury, Richard Fitzralph, afterwards Archbishop of Armagh, the enemy of the mendicant orders, Walter Burley, who translated Aristotle, John Mauduit the astronomer, Robert Holkot and Richard de Kilvington. John Bale and Pits I mention other works of his, Epistolae Familiares and Orationes ad Principes. The opening words of the Philobiblon and the Epistolae as given by Bale represent those of the Philobiblon and its prologue, of that he apparently made two books out of one treatise. It is possible that the Orationes may represent a letter book of Richard de Bury's, entitled Liber Epistolaris quondam dominiis cardi de Bury, Episcopi Dunelmensis, now in the possession of Lord Harlech.

This manuscript, the contents of which are fully catalogued in the Fourth Report (1874) of the Historical Manuscripts Commission (Appendix, pp. 379–397), contains numerous letters from various popes, from the king, a correspondence dealing with the affairs of the university of Oxford, another with the province of Gascony, beside some harangues and letters evidently meant as models to be used on various occasions. It has often been asserted that the Philobiblon itself was not written by Richard de Bury at all, but by Robert Holkot. This assertion is supported by the fact that in seven of the extant manuscripts of Philobiblon it is ascribed to Holkote in an introductory page, in these or slightly varying terms: Incipit prologus in re philobiblon ricardi dunelmensis episcopi que libri composuit ag. The Paris manuscript has simply Philobiblon olchoti anglici, and does not contain the usual concluding note of the date when the book was completed by Richard. As a great part of the charm of book lies in the unconscious record of the collector's own character, the establishment of Holkot's authorship would materially alter its value. A notice of Richard de Bury by his contemporary Adam Murimuth (Continuatio Chronicarum, Rolls series, 1889, p. 171) gives a less favourable account of him than does William de Chambre, asserting that he was only moderately learned, but desired to be regarded as a great scholar.

== The Philobiblon ==
Before his death in 1345, de Bury wrote a book of essays that he compiled in a work entitled The Philobiblon. This was a word he created from the Greek meaning "love of books". Written in Latin, as was the custom of the day, it is separated into twenty chapters. These essays discuss book collecting, the care of books, the "advantages of the love of books", and the vagaries of wars and how they destroy books. In the book, De Bury states that "the same man cannot love both gold and books". In Chapter VII entitled "The Complaint of Books against Wars" de Bury writes:

ALMIGHTY AUTHOR AND LOVER OF PEACE, scatter the nations that delight in war, which is above all plagues injurious to books. For wars being without the control of reason make a wild assault on everything they come across, and, lacking the check of reason they push on without discretion or distinction to destroy the vessels of reason.

Fortunately, these were not the idle words of an academic and bibliophile. As a diplomat, de Bury sought to seek peace throughout the realm, sometimes successfully as was the case with Scotland to the north, sometimes unsuccessfully, as was the case with France and the start of the 100 Years War. One of the most interesting sections in the Philobiblon is Chapter XIX entitled "Of the Manner of lending all our Books to Students". According to one scholar, the Philobiblon is "one of the longest extant medieval texts on the subject of library management". Here, de Bury describes the practices for circulation control among the students of the college, utilising at times an open-stack rather than the dominant closed-stack system. As to de Bury's legacy, it was said about the Philobiblon: "it is the sole memorial of one who loved books so much in an age and country that loved them so little".

== Citations ==
Political offices
Preceded by Adam Lymbergh	Lord Privy Seal; 1329–1334	Succeeded by Robert Ayleston
Preceded by John de Stratford	Lord Chancellor; 1334–1335	Succeeded by John de Stratford
Preceded by Robert Ayleston	Lord High Treasurer; 1334	Succeeded by Henry Burghersh
Catholic Church titles
Preceded by Lewis de Beaumont	Bishop of Durham; 1333–1345	Succeeded by Thomas Hatfield
