= Ferryhill Station =

Village in County Durham, England

Coordinates: 54.67924°N 1.53156°W

Ferryhill Station is situated to the south east of Ferryhill, next to Chilton Lane and near the site of Ferryhill railway station, a few miles south of Durham.

== Notable people ==
- The former Durham cricketer Bob Cole was born in the village.
- A plaque outside 9 Gladstone Terrace denotes where novelist and poet Sid Chaplin lived between 1941 and 1953.
