= Bishop Middleham =

Village in County Durham, England

Coordinates: 54°40.7′N 1°29.3′W

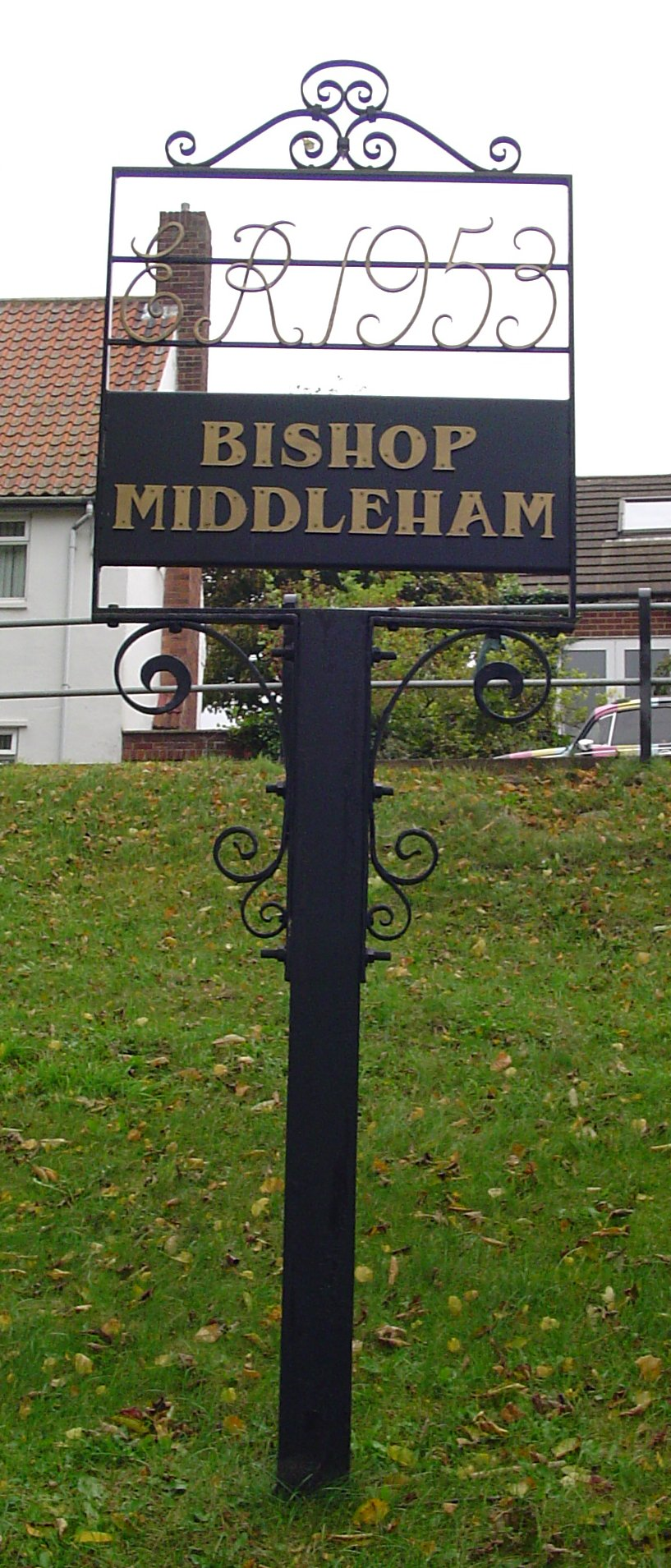
Signpost in Bishop Middleham

Bishop Middleham is a village in County Durham, in England. The population of the parish as taken at the 2011 census was 1,275 It is close to Sedgefield.

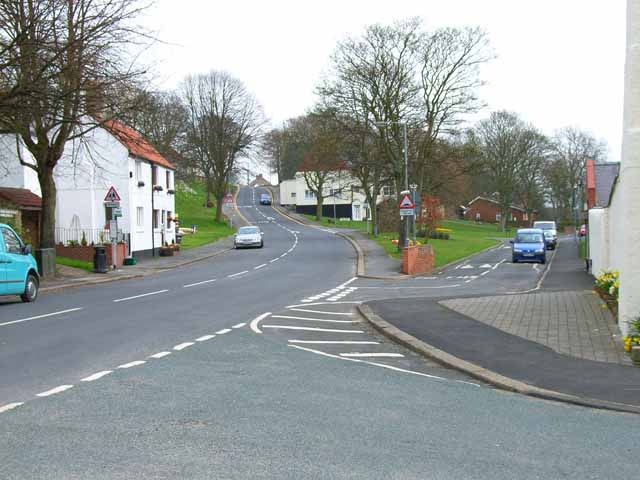
Bishop Middleham village

== History ==
Bishop Middleham lies in a dry valley about 9 miles (14 km) south-east of Durham. Although much of County Durham had probably first been settled in the Mesolithic period, the first evidence for occupation in the parish dates to the Neolithic or Bronze Age. At least two simple flint tools, including an arrowhead, have been found in the area. The arrowhead was probably used by an early hunter, though by the Bronze Age farming would have been widespread. By the Iron Age we have our first evidence for burials in the parish- at least six graves were found in a small cave. A small glass bead decorated with white spiral patterns may also have come from an early or middle Iron Age grave, though it may have been lost in another way.

It is clear that Bishop Middleham was on an important Roman period routeway; the road known as Cades Road runs through the centre of the parish. Despite the presence of this important communication route, no Roman buildings have been found in the parish. Nonetheless several other Roman objects have been uncovered in the area, including a small bronze statue of a Roman god. More unusually a group of four Roman pans stacked one inside each other have also been discovered. They were decorated so as to give them a silver appearance. It is possible they may have had a religious use, as such pans are often shown carved on the site of Roman altars. The discovery of these objects and the small statue may suggest that an as yet undiscovered Roman temple is still to be found.

There is little hard evidence for Anglo-Saxon settlement in the parish, though as Middleham is an Old English name for 'middle settlement or farm' there was certainly some kind of occupation in the area by the 9th or 10th centuries.

In 1146 Osbert, the nephew of Bishop Flambard, gave the Church of Middleham to the Prior and Convent at Durham, this is the first recorded mention of the village. In 1183 the Boldon Book, a survey of all the land owned by the Bishop of Durham, records that there were some 32 households in the village, which was surveyed along with neighbouring Cornforth. The survey was particularly detailed and names a number of individuals such as Arkil, Ralph and William the Headborough. Bishop Middleham was one of the favourite residences of the Bishops of Durham, two of whom died here. The residence of the Bishops now only survives as earthwork remains.

By the late 14th century the Bishop of Durham appears to have no longer used the Castle as a residence and the buildings and land were let out at first to his bailiff. By 1509 this was a man named John Hall who enjoyed a lease of 31 years. The castle and deer park passed through a number of hands over the following centuries including the Eure family of Witton Castle, the Freville's and by the 18th century the Surtees family which included the notable historian Robert Surtees, who lived nearby at Mainsforth and wrote on the village and Castle in his History of Durham in 1823. He is buried in Bishop Middleham church.

By the 19th century the village contained four public houses, a brewery, and a few tradesmen's shops. The village mainly supported itself by farming, though there was some coalmining; the remains of a wagonway have been recorded. The main railway line also ran close to the village.

In 2012 a community website was launched with a view to keeping the local people up to date with news and events, "Bishop Middleham". Bishop Middleham Website.

== The Castle ==
Bishop Middleham Castle was erected at the end of an inland promontory overlooking a dry valley and a maze of watercourses draining into the River Skerne. Today the site is used for agriculture and there is no access to the remains, which are principally a complex series of earthworks indicative of a series of buildings along the steep eastern side of the promontory, some of which have visible masonry extending well above the turf. The later history of the site is unknown, the last standing structures being demolished in 1823.

== St Michael's Church ==
The Church, dedicated to St. Michael and all Angels, stands upon the hill south of the village and is said to have been erected by Bishop Beck, but it is more probably the work of Bishop Poor, and of the date about 1230. It was in 1146 presented to the prior and convent of Durham by Osbert, nephew of Bishop Flambard, but it was soon afterwards annexed to the Priory of Finchale, by Bishop Robert de Insula, and so continued till the dissolution. It is a venerable structure, in the Early English style, and consists of nave, chancel, and aisles, with a western bell turret.

== Environment ==
The Bishop Middleham Community Wildlife Garden (0.87 hectares) has been declared a designated Local Nature Reserve by Sedgefield council.

== Notable residents ==
- Samuel Taylor Coleridge, the poet stayed in Bishop Middleham with Sara Hutchinson and her brother George in 1801.
- Thomas Hutchinson a scholar, was born here in 1698
- Sir Henry Taylor, Author, and friend of William Wordsworth was born in Bishop Middleham
- Muriel Young, theatre and television actress; tv personality: born here 1923.

== Governance ==
- Bishop Middleham is represented in the House of Commons by the constituency of Sedgefield currently held by the Labour Party in the person of Phil Wilson. He was preceded in the seat by Prime Minister Rt Hon Tony Blair.
- Locally Bishop Middleham is governed by the Bishop Middleham Parish Council. The Council consists of 9 Councillors elected every 4 years. every year the council elects one member to serve as Chairman of the Council for a term of 12 months. The Council meets once per month 10 months of the year (excluding July and August) in the Bishop Middleham Village Hall.

== See also ==
- Bishop Middleham Quarry
