= Surtees Society =

English charity and publication society

- Formation: 27 May 1834
- Type: Historical society
- Registration no.: 1003812
- Legal status: Charity
- Purpose: Historical study and research
- Headquarters: Durham, England
- Region served: Former Kingdom of Northumbria (northern England and southern Scotland)
- Official language: English
- Activities: Research and publication
- Collections: Library, archives
- Website: surteessociety.org.uk

The Surtees Society is a text publication society and registered charity (No. 1003812) based in Durham in northern England. The society was established on 27 May 1834 by James Raine, following the death (on 11 February) of the renowned County Durham antiquarian Robert Surtees. Raine and other former friends of Surtees created the society to honour his memory and carry on his legacy, with the focus on publishing documents relating to the region between the Humber estuary and Firth of Forth in the east and the River Mersey and the River Clyde in the west, the region that had once constituted the kingdom of Northumbria. Membership of the Society is by annual subscription (currently £35 for individuals and £50 for institutions). Members receive one cloth bound copy of any volume published during the year of subscription.

== History ==
The Surtees Society was constituted on 27 May 1834 at a meeting held at Durham, and Raine was appointed its first secretary. It was modelled in part on the Scottish Bannatyne Club (founded c. 1823) and Maitland Club (founded 1828). At the 27 May meeting, 94 members were elected, and by 1 July the number had risen to 100. From this time Raine devoted great energy and industry to the interests of the society, editing 17 of its volumes, and establishing it on a permanent basis. It proved the pioneer of many similar English regional and county publishing societies, which adopted its rules and methods.

Between 1855 and 1895 the society's secretary was Raine's son, James Raine the younger.

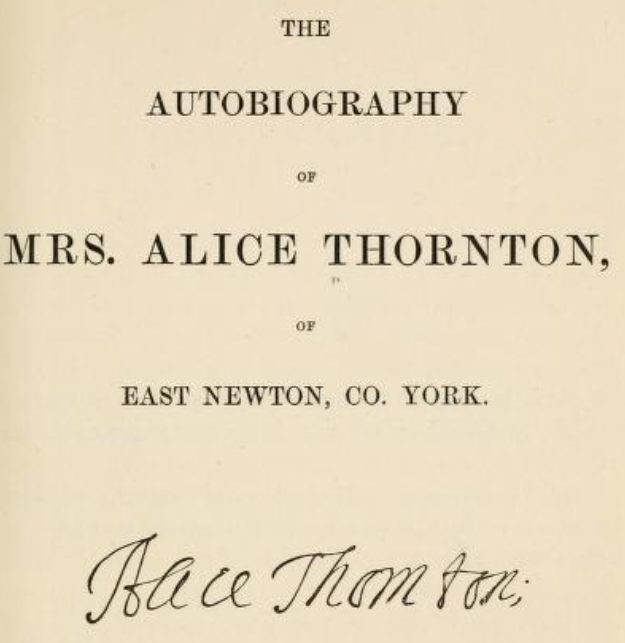
Title page of Alice Thornton's autobiography, dating from the 17th century and published by the Society (1875)

== Publications ==
As of 2026, the society has published 230 volumes, mainly concerning the counties of Durham and Northumberland. Included among the works published are volumes covering the documents of monasteries, including Finchale Priory, Coldingham Priory, Fountains Abbey, Hexham Priory, Whitby Abbey and Brinkburn Priory.

Other records include wills and inventories from Yorkshire, obituaries from Durham Cathedral, heraldic visitations, documents from various archbishops of York and bishops of Durham, and records from the cities of York and Durham.

The society has also published editions of the Lindisfarne Gospels and the Lindisfarne Psalter. In recent years it has published three volumes of material relating to Cumberland or Westmorland (including the cartulary of Lanercost Priory) jointly with the Cumberland and Westmorland Antiquarian and Archaeological Society.

Publications are distributed by Boydell & Brewer.

== Officers ==
=== Presidents ===
- 1834–37 Walter, 5th Duke of Buccleuch
- 1837–40 Edward Maltby
- 1840–43 Richard, 3rd Baron Braybrooke
- 1843–46 Charles, 3rd/5th Earl Fitzwilliam
- 1846–49 Henry, 2nd Duke of Cleveland
- 1849–63 Charles Thorp
- 1863–65 Algernon, 4th Duke of Northumberland
- 1865–84 Walter, 5th Duke of Buccleuch
- 1884–1901 William Stubbs
- 1901–18 Henry, 7th Duke of Northumberland
- 1918–24 William Brown
- 1925–30 Alan, 8th Duke of Northumberland
- 1931–38 Henry Gee
- 1939–45 Hensley Henson
- 1945–52 Alwyn Terrell Petre Williams
- 1953–61 Frederick Maurice Powicke
- 1962–73 John Herbert Severn Wild
- 1980–87 Hilary Seton Offler
- 1987–2002 Richard Barrie Dobson
- 2002–20 Richard Sharpe
- 2020–present Angus J. L. Winchester

=== Secretaries ===
- 1834–49 James Raine
- 1849–52 William George Henderson
- 1852–54 John Pedder
- 1854–95 James Raine Jnr
- 1896–1916 William Brown
- 1916–20 Henry Gee
- 1920–50 Alexander Hamilton Thompson
- 1950–66 Hilary Seton Offler
- 1966–74 W. A. L. Seaman
- 1974–99 A. J. Piper
- 1999–2000 Alan J. Heesom
- 2000–3 Lynda Rollason
- 2003–4 Anne Orde
- 2005–15 Michael M. N. Stansfield
- 2015–present Richard I. Higgins

=== Treasurers ===
- 1834–42 Robert Henry Allan
- 1834–73 John Gough Nichols
- 1843–47 William Greenwell
- 1847–57 William Henderson
- 1857–82 Samuel Rowlandson
- 1881–95 J. T. Fowler
- 1882–4 J. W. Barnes
- 1884–91 J. G. Robinson
- 1891–1932 John George Gradon
- 1932–49 Henry Lawrence Gradon
- 1949–61 A. B. Peacock
- 1961–62 W. Madderson
- 1962–71 Frank Stone
- 1971–81 M. R. Binks
- 1981–86 T. R. Gregory
- 1986–92 J. M. McMinn
- 1992–95 Michael Youll
- 1995–98 James Ramsbotham
- 1998–2000 Michael Carr
- 2001–13 Brian Cheesman
- 2013–15 Peter Maggs
- 2015–present John Marsland

=== Editors ===
- 1968–79 C. Roy Hudleston
- 1980–99 A. J. Piper
- 1999–2011 Margaret M. Harvey
- 1999–2013 Richard Hugh Britnell
- 2011–present Angus J. L. Winchester
- 2011–present Alan J. Heesom
- 2020–present David Crouch

== Bibliography ==
- Bell, Alan (2004), "Raine, James (1791–1858), antiquary and topographer", Oxford Dictionary of National Biography (online ed.), Oxford University Press, doi:10.1093/ref:odnb/23023 (Subscription, Wikipedia Library access or UK public library membership required.)
- Bell, Alan (2004a), "Surtees, Robert (1779–1834), historian", Oxford Dictionary of National Biography (online ed.), Oxford University Press, doi:10.1093/ref:odnb/26790 (Subscription, Wikipedia Library access or UK public library membership required.)
- Fowler, J. T. (1904), Durham University: Earlier Foundations and Present Colleges, London: F. E. Robinson & Co.
- Levine, Philippa (1986), The Amateur and the Professional: Antiquarians, Historians and Archaeologists in Victorian England, 1838–1886, Cambridge: Cambridge University Press, ISBN 978-0-521-53050-7
- Thompson, A. Hamilton (1939). The Surtees Society, 1834–1934, including a catalogue of its publications with notes on their sources and contents, and a list of the members of the society from its beginning to the present day. Surtees Society. Vol. 150. Durham: Surtees Society.

=== Attribution ===
- This article incorporates text from a publication now in the public domain: Carr, William (1896). "Raine, James". In Lee, Sidney (ed.). Dictionary of National Biography. Vol. 47. London: Smith, Elder & Co. pp. 175–176.
