= James Raine (antiquary) =

British antiquarian (1791–1858)

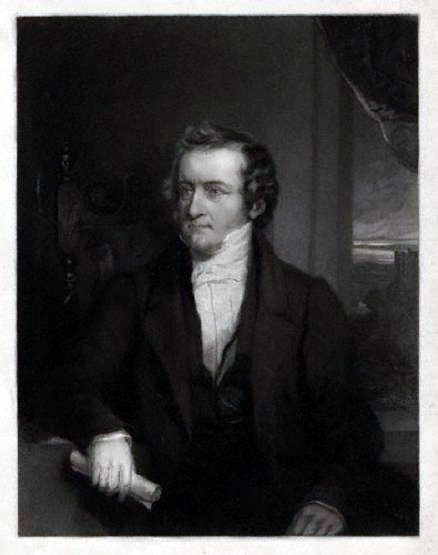
James Raine c. 1852, as depicted by William Walker

James Raine (23 January 1791 – 6 December 1858) was an English antiquarian and topographer. A Church of England clergyman from the 1810s, he held a variety of positions, including librarian to the dean and chapter of Durham and rector of Meldon in Northumberland.

A friend of Robert Surtees, whom he assisted in his work, he founded the Surtees Society in Robert's honour after the latter's death in 1834. Raine served as secretary for the society, and by the time of his death in 1858 he had edited seventeen volumes for it, in addition to numerous other published works.

== Early life ==
James Raine was the son of James Raine, by his wife Anne, daughter of William Moore. He was born at Ovington in the parish of Wycliffe on 23 January 1791. He was educated at Kirby Hill School, and subsequently at Richmond Grammar School. From 1812 to 1827 he was second master of Durham School. Raine was ordained deacon on 25 September 1814, and priest on 20 September 1818. In 1816 he became librarian to the dean and chapter of Durham, and in 1822 he was presented by that body to the rectory of Meldon in Northumberland.

Protracted litigation concerning the tithe at Meldon harassed Raine for many years; but in 1846 the House of Lords decided the dispute in his favour. In 1825 he was instituted principal surrogate in the consistory court, and in 1828 to the living of St Mary in the South Bailey in the city of Durham. These several preferments he held until his death. The degree of M. A. was conferred upon him by the archbishop of Canterbury, at the request of Bishop Barrington, in November 1825. He was incorporated ad eundem gradum in the university of Durham, and the same body conferred upon him the degree of D. C. L. in 1857, in recognition of his literary eminence and of his long service as judge of the ecclesiastical court.

== Surtees Society ==
Raine formed in 1812 an acquaintance with Robert Surtees, lasting until the death of Surtees in 1834. He began by helping friends with topographical works. The county historians, John Hodgson, Cuthbert Sharp, and Surtees, all recorded their debts; Surtees stated that the History of Durham would never have been finished without Raine (Introduction to History of Durham, vol. i. p. x).

Raine subsequently became literary executor to his friend, with the duty of arranging and editing the fourth volume of the History of Durham. This volume appeared in 1840. In 1827 he had performed a similar service for his friend Hodgson, having edited vol. iii. of part 2 of the History of Northumberland during the absence of the author abroad. In 1828 Raine published his first independent work of importance—a monograph dealing with the position of the burial-place of St Cuthbert. It established his position as an antiquarian.

In 1830 the first part of his History of North Durham appeared; the second part, completing the volume, was not published until 1852. This important work, undertaken at the suggestion of Surtees, and begun shortly after the appearance of Surtees's first volume, is the complement of the latter's History of Durham. It embraces the history of certain outlying and detached districts, including Norhamshire and Holy Island, which, when the book was first undertaken, formed a part of the county of Durham, but some of which were subsequently annexed by statute to the county of Northumberland.

On the death of Surtees in 1834 the idea of founding a society to maintain his memory and name originated with Raine. The object of the society as originally devised was "to publish such unedited manuscripts as illustrate the intellectual, moral, religious, and social conditions of those parts of England which lie between the Humber and the Firth of Forth, and on the west from the Mersey to the Clyde, from the earliest period to the Restoration". The Surtees Society was constituted on 27 May 1834, at a meeting held at Durham, and Raine was appointed its first secretary. From this time he devoted great energy and industry to the interests of the society, editing for it seventeen volumes, and establishing it on a permanent basis. It proved the pioneer of many similar societies, which adopted its rules and methods.

== Death and works ==
Raine died at Crook Hall, near Durham, on 6 December 1858, and was buried in Durham Cathedral yard. Raine married, on 28 January 1828, Margaret, the eldest daughter of the Reverend Thomas Peacock and sister of George Peacock (1791–1858), dean of Ely, and had by her three daughters and one son, the Reverend James Raine, chancellor and canon-residentiary of York. One of the three daughters became the famous novelist Margaret Hunt. A portrait of Raine, engraved by W. Walker, after a picture by Clement Burlison, is prefixed to his History of North Durham.

Raine published:

- Proof that the Holy Communion in both kinds was administered to the Laity within the Parish of Norham and Diocese of Durham before the Reformation, Durham, 1825
- Codicum manuscriptorum Ecclesiæ Cathedralis Dunelmensis Catalogus, 1825
- Saint Cuthbert, with an Account of the state in which his Remains were found upon the opening of his Tomb in Durham Cathedral, Durham, 1828
- A Brief Account of Durham Cathedral, 1833
- Catterick Church, in the County of York; a Copy of the Contract for its building, dated in 1412, with Remarks and Notes, London, 1834
- A Brief Historical Account of the Episcopal Castle or Palace of Auckland, 1852
- The History and Antiquities of North Durham, as subdivided into the Shires of Norham Island and Bedlington, London, 1852
- A Memoir of the Rev. J. Hodgson, 2 vols. 1857
- Marske, a small Contribution towards Yorkshire Topography, 1860

Raine edited for the Surtees Society the following volumes:

- Reginaldus Monachus Dunelmensis, 1835
- Wills and Inventories illustrative of the History of the Northern Counties of England, 1835
- The Towneley Mysteries, 1836
- Durham Sanctuary, 1837
- Finchall Priory, the Charters of Endowment of, 1837
- Miscellanea Biographica, 1838
- The Priory of Coldingham, 1841
- A Description of Ancient Monuments within the Monastical Church of Durham, 1842
- The Correspondence of M. Hutton, Arch. of York, 1843
- The Durham Household Book, 1844
- Depositions and Ecclesiastical Proceedings from the Courts of Durham, 1845
- The Injunctions of R. Barnes, Bishop of Durham, 1850
- A Memoir of R. Surtees by G. Taylor, with Additions, 1852
- The Obituary Rolls of W. Ebchester and J. Burnby, Priors of Durham, 1856

Professional and academic associations
Preceded by Creation	Secretary of the Surtees Society; 1834–49	Succeeded by William George Henderson
