= Sir Charles Sedley, 5th Baronet =

17th-century English noble, dramatist, and politician

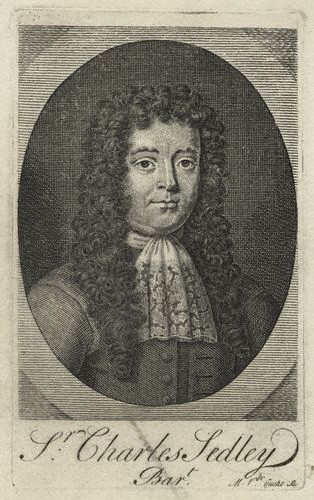
Sir Charles Sedley

Sir Charles Sedley, 5th Baronet (March 1639 – 20 August 1701) was a British nobleman dramatist, and politician. He is chiefly remembered for his sharp wit and notorious profligacy, which made him a prominent figure in Restoration society. Sedley wrote plays, poetry, and essays, and his flamboyant lifestyle and literary output earned him both admiration and scandal during his lifetime.

== Life ==
He was the son of Sir John Sedley, 2nd Baronet, of Aylesford in Kent, and his wife Elizabeth, daughter of Sir Henry Savile. The Sedleys (also sometimes spelt Sidley) had been prominent in Kent since at least 1337. Sedley's grandfather, William Sedley, was knighted in 1605 and created a baronet in 1611. He was the founder of the Sidleian Lectures of Natural Philosophy at Oxford.

Sedley was educated at Wadham College, Oxford, but left without taking a degree. There his tutor was the poet Walter Pope. The second surviving son of Sir John Sedley and Elizabeth, William, succeeded to the baronetcy in 1645.

Charles Sedley inherited the title (5th baronet) in 1656 when his brother William died. By his first wife Lady Katherine Savage, daughter of John, 2nd Earl Rivers he had only one legitimate child, Catherine, Countess of Dorchester, mistress of James II. The couple lived in Great Queen Street. After his first wife had been sent to a convent in Ghent on account of a serious mental condition, Sedley in vain tried to obtain a divorce.

He met Ann Ayscough, probably around 1670, by whom he had two illegitimate sons, William and Charles Sedley. William died in infancy, and the brother Charles was knighted by William III after the coronation in 1689 and created a baronet in 1702. The relationship with Ann Ayscough lasted to the end of Sedley's life. Sedley died at Hampstead on 20 August 1701 and was buried at Southfleet Church on the 26th. The Sedley baronetcy became extinct on his death.

Sedley is famous as a patron of literature in the Restoration period, and was the Francophile Lisideius of Dryden's Essay of Dramatic Poesy. However, it was above all Sedley's wit that his contemporaries admired him for.

Sedley was reputed as a notorious rake and libertine, part of the "Merry Gang" of courtiers which included the Earl of Rochester and Lord Buckhurst. The gang engaged in acts that were violent, outraged public decency and often included violence against women.

In 1663 an indecent frolic in Bow Street, for which he was fined 2,000 marks, made Sedley notorious.

From the balcony of Oxford Kate's Tavern he, Lord Buckhurst and Sir Thomas Ogle shocked and delighted a crowd of onlookers with their blasphemous and obscene antics. According to Samuel Pepys, Sedley "showed his nakedness – and abusing of scripture and as it were from thence preaching a mountebank sermon from the pulpit, saying that there he had to sell such a pouder as should make all the cunts in town run after him, 1000 people standing underneath to see and hear him, and that being done he took a glass of wine and washed his prick in it and then drank it off, and then took another and drank the King's health." This behaviour provoked a riot amongst the onlookers and condemnation in the courts, where the Lord Chief Justice gave his opinion that it was because of wretches like him "that God's anger and judgement hang over us".

Sedley was member of parliament for New Romney in Kent, and took an active and useful part in politics. A speech of his on the civil list after the Revolution is cited by Macaulay as proof that his reputation as a man of wit and ability was deserved. His bon mot at the expense of James II is well known. The king had seduced his daughter and created her countess of Dorchester, whereupon Sedley said: "As the king has made my daughter a countess, the least I can do, in common gratitude, is to assist in making his Majesty's daughter (Mary) a queen". Sedley is also occasionally associated with a notorious gang of unbridled revellers who called themselves Ballers and who were active between 1660 and 1670. It was probably Sedley who wrote the Ballers' Oath on their behalf.

Sedley's parliamentary career started in the 1660s but around 1677/78 he joined the Whig cause. When Charles II died in 1685, Sedley was illegally excluded from the parliament of his successor James II, which convened in May 1685. There can be no doubt that Sedley opposed the Catholic James and supported William of Orange in the crucial year of 1688. Sedley was returned in the second Parliament of William, elected in March 1690. More speeches and parliamentary motions followed in 1690, including discussions on the Bill for regulating trials for High Treason, which sheds light on Sedley's political commitment after the Revolution. Sedley's speeches were included in the 1702 edition of The Miscellaneous Works. Sedley kept his seat in Parliament until his death in 1701.

== Family ==
Charles Sedley inherited the title (5th baronet) in 1656 when his brother William died. By his first wife, Lady Katherine Savage, daughter of John Savage, 2nd Earl Rivers, he had only one legitimate child, Catherine, Countess of Dorchester, who later became a mistress of James II of England. After his first wife had been sent to a convent in Ghent on account of a serious mental condition, Sedley tried in vain to obtain a divorce.

He met Ann Ayscough, probably around 1670, by whom he had two illegitimate sons, William and Charles Sedley. William died in infancy, and the brother Charles was knighted by William III of Orange after the coronation in 1689 and created a baronet in 1702. The relationship with Ann Ayscough lasted until the end of Sedley's life.

== Legacy ==
His reputation as a wit and dissolute was partially responsible for the Sedleys of William Makepeace Thackeray's Vanity Fair.

== Works ==
=== Poems ===
His most famous song, "Phyllis is My Only Joy", is much more widely known now than the author's name. While Sedley chiefly produced light amatory verse and pastoral dialogues in the 1670s, he turned to satirical epigrams in the 1680s and 1690s. His Epigrams: or, Court Characters are modelled on the works of Martial. In his epigram "To Nysus", for example, Sedley describes the function of satire and emphasises the aggressive mode of satire: "Let us write satyr than, and at our ease / Vex the ill-natur'd Fools we cannot please." At the same time, Sedley translated other specimens of ancient poetry, such as Virgil's Georgics IV, the eighth Ode of the second Book of Horace and three elegies from Ovid's Amores. Dryden included Sedley's translations from Ovid in the Miscellany of 1684. The burlesque poem Dildoides: A Burlesque Poem (1706) has sometimes been attributed to Sedley, who is named as its author in the manuscript miscellany of Sir William Haward.

A number of his poems have been set to music: "Phyllis is My Only Joy" in a glee by John William Hobbs (1799–1877), "Not, Celia, that I Juster Am" in a solo song by the English composer Elizabeth Turner (1700–1756), and "Hears Not My Phillis" (Knotting Song, Z.371) in a solo song by the English composer Henry Purcell (1659–1695). In 1692 Sedley wrote the birthday ode for Queen Mary, "Love’s goddess sure was blind", which was also set to music by Purcell. The poem was printed in The Gentleman’s Journal of May 1692.

=== Plays ===
His first comedy, The Mulberry-Garden (1668), sustains Sedley's contemporary reputation for wit in conversation. The best, but most licentious, of his comedies is Bellamira: or, The Mistress (1687), an imitation of the Eunuchus of Terence, in which the heroine is supposed to represent Barbara Villiers, Duchess of Cleveland, the mistress of Charles II. While The Mulberry-Garden exuberantly praises the achievements of the Restoration, Bellamira displays a dark cynicism which has to be accounted for within a changed historical context. His two tragedies, Antony and Cleopatra (1677) and The Tyrant King of Crete (1702), an adaptation of Henry Killigrew's Pallantus and Eudora, have little merit. He also produced The Grumbler (1702), an adaptation of Le Grondeur of Brueys and Palaprat. However, many contents of Sedley's posthumous edition are spurious. Apart from the prologues of his own plays, Sedley wrote at least four more prologues to comedies, the best-known of which was written for Shadwell's Epsom Wells.

=== Editions ===
- Pompey the Great (1664); adaptation and translation of Corneille's La mort de Pompée (1644); together with Charles Sackville (later Earl of Dorset), Sidney Godolphin, Edmund Waller, and Sir Edward Filmer.
- The Mulberry-Garden (1668); partly modeled on Molière's L'École des Maris (1661). Written in uneven metered verse ('loose pentameters')
- Antony and Cleopatra (1677) in rhyming heroic couplets
- Bellamira: or, The Mistress (1687); partly modeled on Terence's Eunuchus, in prose
- Beauty the Conquerour: or, The Death of Marc Antony (posthumous 1702) in rhyming heroic couplets
- The Miscellaneous Works of the Honourable Sir Charles Sedley (London, 1702) including:
  - Drama: A Pastoral Dialogue Between Thirsis and Strephon (heroic couplets)
  - Drama: A Dialogue between Amintas and Celia (rhymed ABAB ballad or common meter)
  - Drama: A Dialogue between Mars and Cupid (rhymed ABAB ballad or common meter)
  - Various songs (lyrics only)
  - Poems (both lyric and dramatic)
  - A poetic translation of Horace and Virgil
  - Dramatic prologues for Dryden, and a commentary on the Author of The Satyr against Wit
  - Epigrams: or, Court Characters addressed to or about various court members, regarding their scandals, under Greco-Roman pseudonyms
  - Speeches in the House of Commons, upon several Weighty Matters: Also Letters and Essays
- The Works of the Honourable Sir Charles Sedley, 2 vols (London, 1722).
- The Works of the Honourable Sir Charles Sedley, 2 vols (London, 1776).
- (possibly by Sedley) The Tyrant King of Crete; shortened version of Henry Killigrew's Pallantus and Eudora.
- (possibly by Sedley) The Grumbler; translation of a French farce Le Grondeur
- The Poetical and Dramatic Works of Sir Charles Sedley, ed. Vivian de Sola Pinto. 2 vols (London, 1928; repr. New York: AMS Press, 1969).
- Sir Charles Sedley's "The Mulberry-Garden" (1668) and "Bellamira: or, The Mistress" (1687): An Old-Spelling Critical Edition with an Introduction and a Commentary, ed. Holger Hanowell, Münster Monographs on English Literature (Frankfurt am Main: Peter Lang, 2001).

Parliament of England
Preceded by Sir Norton Knatchbull; Henry Brouncker	Member of Parliament for New Romney; 1668–1685; With: Sir Norton Knatchbull 1668–1679; Paul Barret 1679–1685	Succeeded by Sir William Goulston; Thomas Chudleigh
Preceded by John Brewer; James Chadwick	Member of Parliament for New Romney; 1690–1695; With: John Brewer	Succeeded by John Brewer; Sir William Twysden
Preceded by John Brewer; Sir William Twisden	Member of Parliament for New Romney; 1696–1701; With: John Brewer	Succeeded by John Brewer; Edward Goulston
Baronetage of England
Preceded by William Sedley	Baronet (of Ailesford); 1656–1701	Extinct
