= Harry Bramma =

British organist and composer (1936–2026)

- Bramma, c. 1960
- Born: 11 November 1936; Shipley, West Yorkshire, England
- Died: 23 August 2026 (aged 89); Chislehurst, England
- Education: Oxford University
- Occupations: Organist; Composer; Academic teacher
- Organizations: Worcester Cathedral; King's School, Worcester; Southwark Cathedral; Royal School of Church Music; All Saints, Margaret Street

Harry Wakefield Bramma (11 November 1936 – 23 August 2026) was a British organist and composer, and an authority on Anglican church music. After studies of theology and music at Oxford University, he first went into teaching, but then became assistant organist at Worcester Cathedral in 1963 and taught notable students at King's School, Worcester. He served in London as the organist at Southwark Cathedral from 1978, as from 1989 as both director of the Royal School of Church Music (RSCM) and as director of music at All Saints, Margaret Street. He kept composing choral compositions for the Church after he retired from the RSCM in 1998. Some of his compositions were recorded, and garnered favourable reviews.

== Life and career ==
Bramma was born in Shipley on 11 November 1936 and educated at Bradford Grammar School. His early musical education included organ lessons under Melville Cook, the organist of Leeds Parish Church. From 1955, he attended Oxford University, reading theology and music, and studying as organ scholar of Pembroke College with Bernard Rose. He graduated as Bachelor of Arts in 1958 and Master of Arts in 1960.

Bramma started a career in teaching as director of music at the King Edward VI School, Retford from 1961 to 1963. In 1963 he took the position as assistant organist at Worcester Cathedral, under Christopher Robinson, also becoming director of music at the King's School, Worcester, in 1965. Bramma's students at the King's School included a number of noted musicians, among them Nicholas Cleobury, Stephen Cleobury, Jonathan Darlington, Stephen Darlington, Andrew Millington, Jonathan Nott, Adrian Partington and Geoffrey Webber. He recorded with the Worcester Cathedral Choir, both as conductor and organist, including music by Edward Elgar.

In 1976, Bramma moved to Southwark Cathedral, where he, as organist and director of music, had to rebuild the choir. Within two years, he raised their standard to performing on radio. He was a good organ recitalist and became president of the Royal College of Organists. In 1989 Bramma became director of the Royal School of Church Music, succeeding Lionel Dakers, where he stayed until 1998. He was at the same time also director of music at All Saints, Margaret Street, from 1989 until 2004, because he believed that a leader in teaching ought to have involvement in church music making. He kept playing organ concerts in London and composing after retiring from the RSCM.

His choral sacred compositions include settings of the ancient Latin Christian hymns "O salutaris hostia" and "Tantum ergo", "I Will Receive the Cup of Salvation", a setting of poetic text by St. Teresa of Avila, "Alleluya, This Is the Day", an arrangement of the Eastern Orthodox funeral hymn "Kontakion of the Departed", a set of preces and responses, and music for Advent and Christmas.

The choir of All Saints, with organist Henry Parkes, issued a CD of his compositions in 2011. A reviewer from Gramophone noted that his harmonies were influenced by Elgar, Howells and Vaughan Williams; and summarised:

All the music on this disc is composed in a conservative idiom and has a restrained, prayerful quality; the powerful, extrovert flourishes of Leighton, Mathias or Rutter won't be found here. However, Bramma's contemplative miniature settings are equally enjoyable and his intimate knowledge of the liturgy and sacred texts results in expressive word-painting.

Bramma published his memoirs in 2025, entitled Not Half Bad: A Lifetime of Musical Development and Other Stories. A reviewer described him as a "lovable, father-like figure" who "may even represent the last bastion of Edwardian Romanticism".

Bramma died in Chislehurst on 23 August 2026, aged 89.

== Compositions ==
Sacred choral music by Bramma includes:

- "Alleluya. This is the day." (2009)
- "Be filled with the spirit" (1989)
- "Benedicite, omnia opera" (2010)
- "God is light. A sequence for Candlemas" (1982)
- "It is high time to awake out of sleep" (for Advent, a cappella)
- "I will go unto the altar of God"
- "I will receive the cup of salvation"
- "Late have I loved thee"
- "The Kontakion of the Departed" (choral arrangement, a cappella)
- "O salutaris hostia" (1999)
- "People, look East", carol
- "Preces and Responses"
- "The souls of the righteous" (1987, rev. 2005)
- "Tantum ergo Sacramentum" (1999)
- "Tantum ergo Sacramentum" (2005)

== Bibliography ==
- Not Half Bad: A Lifetime of Musical Development and Other Stories. Royal School of Church Music. 2025. ISBN 978-1-0687661-1-4.

== Sources ==
- Bramma, Harry Wakefield, Who's Who, A & C Black, 2011; online ed., Oxford University Press, Dec 2010; online ed., Oct 2010, accessed 30 July 2011.

Cultural offices
Preceded by Ernest Warrell	Organist and Master of the Choristers of Southwark Cathedral; 1976–1989	Succeeded by Peter Wright
