= The Mulberry-Garden =

The Mulberry-Garden is a comedy by Restoration poet and playwright Sir Charles Sedley (1639–1701) and was published in 1668

== Stage history and reception ==
In his diary, Samuel Pepys mentions Sedley's long-awaited play: "It being the first day of Sir Charles Sidly's new play, so long expected, The Mulbery guarden" Pepys, however, who frequented the theatre was disappointed after the première in the Theatre in Bridges Street on 18 May 1668. Apart from this short critique, no other comment on the performance is known. Pepys was not only disappointed with the language and design of the play; a lover of music like himself also disapproved of the musical setting.

The play was performed again on 20 May 1668, following on another probable performance the previous day. The Mulberry-Garden was still performed on 29 June 1668. While the play was not a smash hit, it had the average reception of so many other comedies at the time. The new edition of The Mulberry-Garden (1675) suggests that the play was revived for the theatre season of 1674/75.

As far as is known, The Mulberry-Garden was not revived after Sedley's death (1701). Unlike the well-known comedies The Country Wife, The Man of Mode and Ravenscroft's London Cuckolds, Sedley's play never belonged to a canon of plays which were regularly performed in the eighteenth century.

== The structure of The Mulberry-Garden ==
The Mulberry-Garden is a typical split-plot tragicomedy, which was a popular and thriving genre of Restoration comedy between 1660 and 1671. The multi-plot structure generally comprises a heroic couple (e.g. Althea and Eugenio, Diana and Philander in Sedley's play) in a high plot with a chivalric or aristocratic code of impeccable moral integrity, whose discourse is usually presented in (rhyming) couplets. Therefore, heroic high plots in tragicomedies share with heroic drama in general the basic conception to instruct the spectator and to raise in him an admiration for the heroic characters (see Lisideus's definition of drama in John Dryden's Essay of Dramatick Poesie).

A satiric middle plot introduces a witty "gay couple" (Olivia and Wildish, a polite rake) that manages to live the free spirit of self-determination, although their love is frequently threatened by blocking characters (Olivia's uncle, the Puritan Sir Samuel Forecast). On the third level, the gulling plot, certain stereotypical characters, such as the sanctimonious Puritan (Sir Samuel), the modish gallant (Estridge and Modish), or the lecherous old ogler, are satirized. Examples of this type of play are James Howard's The English Mounsieur (1663/1674), George Etherege's Comical Revenge: or, Love in a Tub (1664), John Dryden's An Evening's Love: or, The Mock Astrologer (1667), and William Wycherley's Love in a Wood (1671). Although tragicomedies generally do not feature heroic characters in epic-like situations, they uphold class distinctions, social hierarchies, and aristocratic values in the high plots.

In The Mulberry-Garden, Sedley created a heroic high plot in which the two couples are facing a sea of troubles hindering their love, and the marriages of Althea and Eugenio and Diana and Philander are finally brought about only by the device of deus ex machina. The lovers are characterized by distinctive sets of values that determine their behaviour within a frame of idealized romance. The male heroic characters follow a code of honour in the traditional vein of chivalry, and the female equivalents stand for virtue and moral integrity. As in the code of romances, the attitude towards love remains both idealistic and asexual throughout the play; the heroic lovers are never in danger of sexual promiscuity or of other forces that imperil their virtue.

It is through the female heroine of the middle plot, Olivia, that the rhyming confessions of her sister Victoria are presented as pompous. The gay couple of the middle plot offers an ideal of marriage which is based upon independence and the pursuit of one's personal happiness. Whatever standards the heroic couples (re)present, it is the marriage of Olivia and Wildish that is central to the play. Therefore, the middle plot presents a golden mean between two extremes. Although The Mulberry-Garden is not anti-heroic, the validity of older, stricter conventions of patriarchal authority and unreflecting obedience are called into question.

The original Mulberry garden was a tree-planted pleasure ground and occupied the site of the present Buckingham Palace and gardens. Its name derives from a garden of mulberry trees planted in the reign of James I. in 1609. For Bellamira: or, The Mistress, Sedley's racy comedy of 1687, see Bellamira (Sedley play).

== Editions ==
17th and 18th Century editions

- Quarto editions of 1668 and 1675, printed for Henry Herringman
- The Works of the Honourable Sir Charles Sedley, published by Samuel Briscoe (London, 1722)

Modern Edition

- Holger Hanowell (2001). Sir Charles Sedley's "The Mulberry-Garden" (1668) and "Bellamira: or, The Mistress" (1687). An Old-Spelling Critical Edition with an Introduction and a Commentary. Frankfurt a. M.

== See also ==
- Mulberry (disambiguation)
- Mulberry garden
