= Henry Bright (schoolmaster, born 1562) =

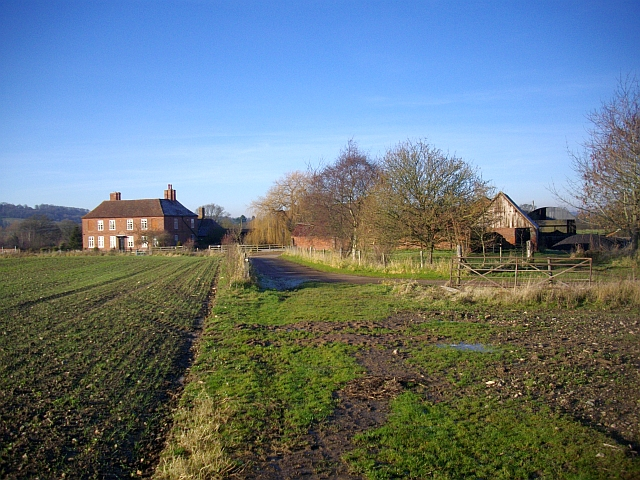
Brockbury Hall in the parish of Colwall, Herefordshire

Henry Bright (baptised 26 October 1562 – 4 March 1627^{[A]}) was a clergyman and schoolmaster in Worcester. He served for 38 years Headmaster at The King's School, Worcester, and is mentioned by Thomas Fuller and Anthony Wood as an exceptional teacher, particularly of Latin, Greek and Hebrew. The period was at the height of Neo-Latin writing and Latin medium teaching. Many of his pupils are notable for their faculty in Latin and Greek and their impact on theological matters.

== Life and reputation ==
Bright was baptised at the Church of St. Peter the Great in Worcester on 26 October 1562. He was the eldest son of James Bright, son of Nathaniel Bright (1493–1564). He was probably educated at King's Worcester himself, and matriculated at Brasenose College, Oxford as a "plebeian" in 1580, aged 18. Having moved to Balliol College, Oxford, he graduated B.A. (1584) and M.A. (1587), and was elected to a fellowship at Balliol in 1585.

Starting at King's Worcester in 1589, he also held a number of preferments in the church, including the rectories of Broadwas (1591), Tredington (1606) and Warndon (1615), and canonries at Hereford Cathedral (1607) and Worcester Cathedral (1619). In 1609 he purchased the estate of Brockbury in the parish of Colwall, Herefordshire. He died on 4 March 1627.^{[A]} Thomas Fuller, in his History of the Worthies of England, praised Bright as follows:

For my own part, I behold this Master Bright placed by Divine Providence in this city, in the Marches, that he might equally communicate the lustre of grammar learning to youth both of England and Wales.

Pupils did attend the school from Wales as well as England. Bright arranged for Worcester Cathedral chapter to provide exhibition scholarships of 2 shillings per annum for pupils he sent to university. His reputation was also echoed by Anthony Wood in his Fasti Oxoniensis:

He had a most excellent faculty in instructing youths in Latin, Greek and Hebrew, most of which were afterwards sent to the universities, where they proved eminent to emulation. He was also an excellent preacher, was resorted to far and near ... The posterity of this Hen. Bright do now live in genteel fashion in Worcestershire.

Nevertheless, Bright had among at least some of his pupils a reputation for brutality, which was recorded by Thomas Hall in the manuscript of Hall's autobiography left in his papers.

== Family ==
=== Arms ===
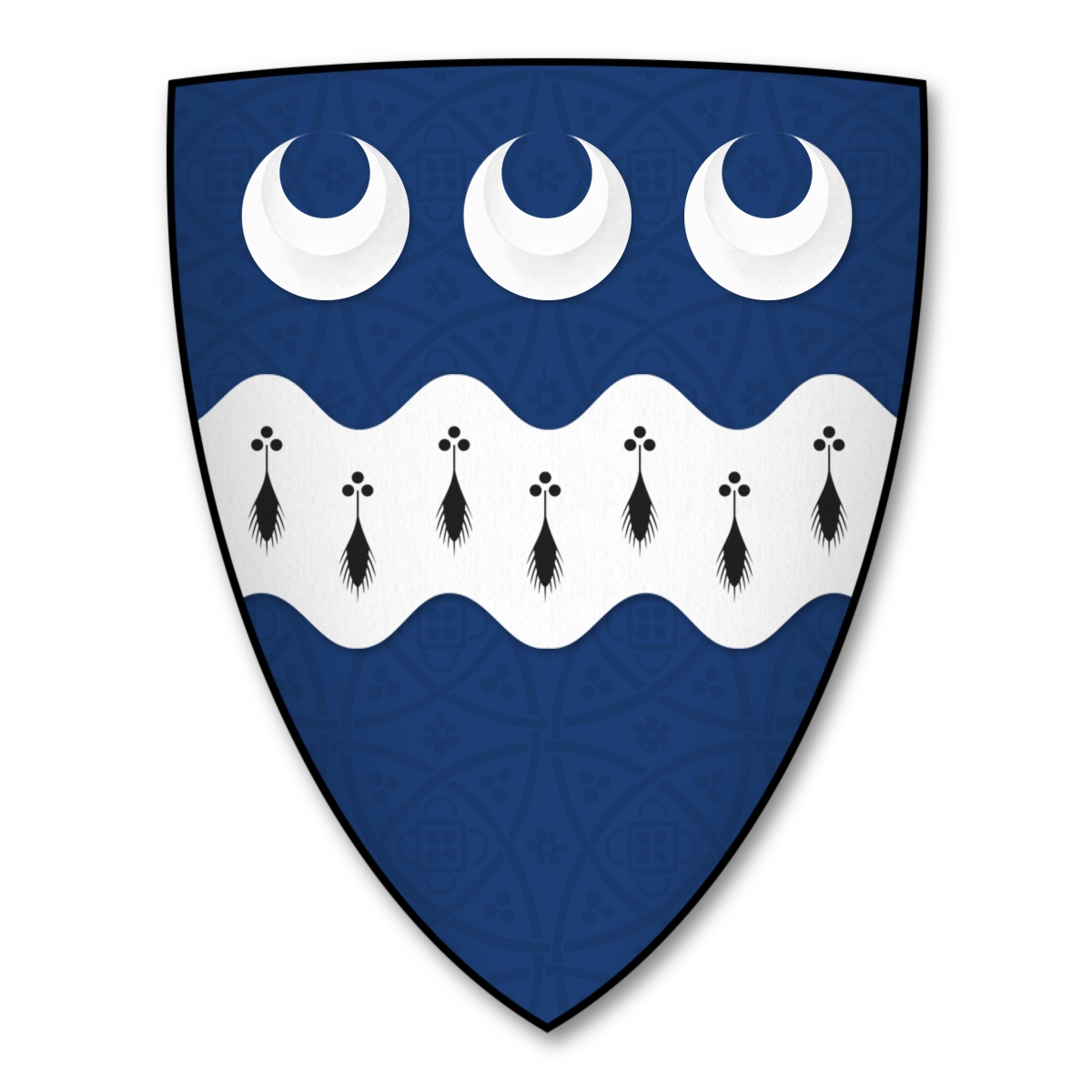
Arms of Bright

Bright's arms are blazoned Azure, a fess wavy ermine in chief three crescents argent.

=== Marriages and children ===
Bright married twice. Firstly he married Maria Tovey, by whom he had a daughter:

- Mary Bright

Secondly he married Joan Berkeley, a daughter of Rowland Berkeley MP and a sister of Sir Robert Berkeley MP, the judge. They had a son and three daughters:

- Robert Bright (1617–1665), son and heir
- Dorothy Bright
- Joyce Bright, who married John Brydges (1604–1669) – they had three daughters, Brydges' coheirs
- Catherine Bright

Robert Bright inherited the estate of Brockbury, which remained in the family for many centuries, passing down to Henry Bright MP (1784–1869), then to the Oxford historian James Franck Bright (1832–1920).

== Epitaph ==
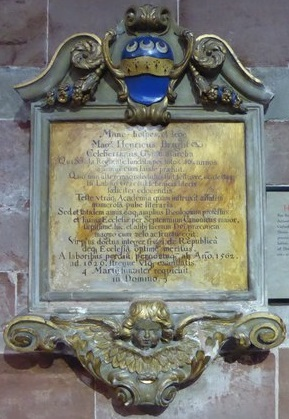
Wall monument to Henry Bright in Worcester Cathedral, with Latin epitaph by Joseph Hall, Dean of Worcester

Bright's wall monument survives in Worcester Cathedral. It carries an epitaph written by Joseph Hall (then Dean of Worcester), and quoted by Fuller as follows:

Mane, Hospes, et lege.	Halt, stranger, and read.
Magister Henricus Bright,	Mr. Henry Bright,
celeberrimus Gymnasiarcha,	The most celebrated schoolmaster,
qui Scholae Regiae istic fundatae	Who over the Royal School here founded,
per totos quadraginta annos summa cum laude praefuit :	For 40 years in all, presided with the highest distinction.
Quo non alter magis sedulus fuit scitusve aut dexter	No other was more diligent or wise than he, or more skilled
in Latinis, Graecis, Hebraicis Literis feliciter edocendis :	At felicitously imparting Latin, Greek and Hebrew letters:
Teste utraque Academia, quam instruxit affatim numerosa pube literaria;	As witness, both universities, which he supplied amply with numerous learned youths.
Sed et totidem annis coque amplius Theologiam professus,	For as many years, furthermore, ordained in theology,
et hujus Ecclesiae per septennium Canonicus major,	And for seven years a major canon of this church,
sepissimè hic et alibi sacrum Dei Praeconem magno cum zelo et fructu egit;	Very often, here and elsewhere, he acted as God's holy herald with great zeal and effect;
Vir pius, doctus, integer, frugi, de Republicâ deque Ecclesia optimè meritus,	A pious man, learned, of integrity and restraint, worthy of the best of Church and State alike,
à laboribus perdiu pernoctuque ab anno 1562 ad 1626,	From his labours by day and by night from the year 1562 to 1626^{[A]}
strenue usque extant latis, 4to Martii suaviter requievit in Domino.	Exhausted at last, on 4 March sweetly rested in the Lord.

== Notable pupils ==
Bright is principally remembered for the pupils he taught at Worcester whom he frequently sent to Oxford, many of whom became well known. They include:

- John Beale FRS, clergyman and scientific writer, in whom Bright helped develop an interest in Erasmus
- Samuel Butler, a poet and satirist, author of Hudibras
- John Doughtie, Canon of Westminster Abbey, buried in Westminster Abbey
- William Dugard, schoolmaster and publisher, associate of John Milton
- Thomas Good, Master of Balliol College, Oxford
- Thomas Hall, presbyterian minister ejected from the Church of England in 1662
- Robert Harris, President of Trinity College, Oxford
- Roger Maynwaring, Dean of Worcester and Bishop of St David's, chaplain to Charles I
- Thomas Nabbes, dramatist
- Hannibal Potter, President of Trinity College, Oxford
- Francis Potter FRS, Biblical commentator and scientific innovator
- Sir John Vaughan, judge and statesman, Chief Justice of the Common Pleas
- Thomas Warmestry, Dean of Worcester
- Edward Winslow, one of the Pilgrim Fathers, Governor of Plymouth Colony, Massachusetts
