= King's School, Worcester =

Private school in Worcester, England

Coordinates: 52.187533°N 2.220671°W

The King's School, Worcester
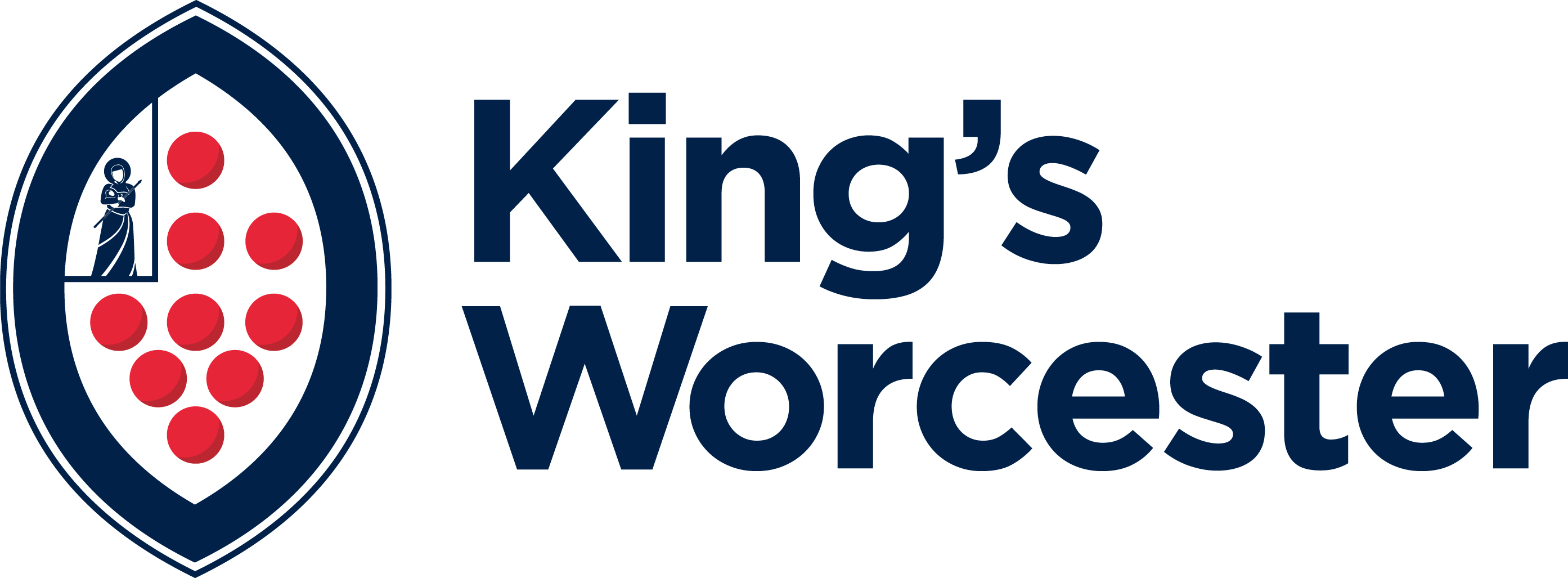

Location
- 5 College Green; Worcester, Worcestershire, WR1 2LL; England

Information
- Type: Private day school Cathedral school
- Motto: τα μεν διδακτά μανθάνω, τα δ' ευρετά ζητώ, τα δ' ευκτά παρά θεών ητησάμην. I learn what may be taught; I seek what may be sought; My other wants I dare To ask from Heaven in prayer. — Sophocles apud Plutarch (Moralia)
- Religious affiliation: Church of England
- Established: 1541; 485 years ago (refoundation)
- Founder: Henry VIII (refoundation)
- Department for Education URN: 117037 Tables
- Chairman: Pat Preston
- Head: Mr Ben Charles (Acting Head)
- Staff: c. 140
- Gender: Coeducational
- Age: 2 to 18
- Enrolment: 1,467
- Houses: 8 (+ 4 discontinued)
- Colours: Navy blue and white
- Publication: The Vigornian
- Alumni: Old Vigornians
- Affiliation: HMC
- Website: www.ksw.org.uk

The King's School, Worcester is a private co-educational day school refounded by Henry VIII in 1541. It occupies a site adjacent to Worcester Cathedral on the banks of the River Severn in the centre of the city of Worcester. It offers mixed-sex mainstream education that follows the UK National Curriculum to around 1,465 pupils aged 2 to 18. At age 11, approximately two thirds of pupils join the senior school from its two prep schools, King's Hawford and King's St Albans, while others come from maintained schools in the city of Worcester and the surrounding areas that include Malvern, Redditch, Kidderminster, Evesham and Pershore.

== Campuses ==
The King's, Worcester group consists of three different schools. These include:

- King's Hawford: (ages 2–11, c. 320 pupils), formerly an autonomous fee-paying prep school named Hawford Lodge, purchased by King's in 1992, situated north of central Worcester. No recommendations were made in the 2008 inspection.
- King's St Alban's: (ages 2–11, c. 215 pupils), formerly the Cathedral Choir School, amalgamated with King's in 1943, situated adjacent to the senior school. St Alban's includes a pre-prep department for ages 4–7, opened September 2009.
- King's Worcester: (ages 11–18, c. 930 pupils), the senior school.

The senior school is situated on Worcester's College Green, next to Worcester Cathedral and on the east bank of the River Severn. Many of the school's buildings on the Green are leased from the cathedral, including College Hall (formerly the monastic refectory, for many years the school's only teaching hall, and currently an assembly hall) and Edgar Tower, the medieval gatehouse to College Green, which for many years housed the school library. The school and the cathedral maintain a close relationship, with the school providing cathedral choristers and using the cathedral for major services. The most senior members of school staff, the cathedral choristers, and the school's King's and Queen's Scholars are ex officio members of the cathedral foundation, while the school is required by statute to have the cathedral Dean and Chapter represented on its governing body.

The school owns extensive land next to New Road cricket ground across the river, used as sports pitches and fields. The school also owns an outward bound centre, the Old Chapel near Crickhowell in Mid Wales.

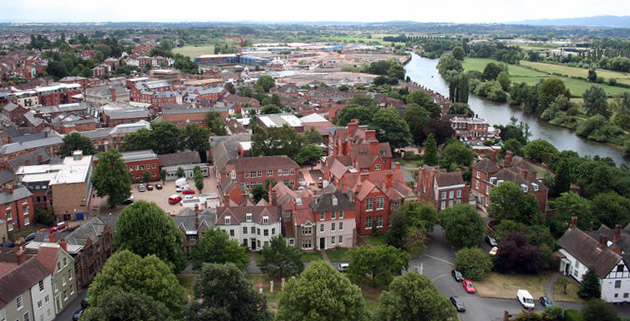
View of the school from the cathedral tower (photo Bob Embleton)

== History ==
Following the dissolution of the monastery in 1540, the new cathedral foundation included provision for a choir school for ten cathedral choristers and tuition for forty King's Scholars. The school was one of seven "King's Schools" established or re-endowed by Henry VIII following the dissolution. On 7 December 1541, Henry VIII appointed the school's first headmaster, John Pether, by means of a letter to Richard Rich. One early headmaster, Henry Bright is mentioned in Thomas Fuller’s Worthies of England, and is commemorated in Worcester Cathedral.

The school was managed by the cathedral Dean and Chapter until 1884, when Headmaster W.E. Bolland's New Scheme introduced governance by a separate Governing Body, on which the Chapter nonetheless retained a majority. From its inception until the construction of School House in 1888, all teaching was conducted in College Hall, the former monastic refectory.

From 1945 to 1976, the school participated in the direct grant scheme, accepting pupils funded by central government on a competitive basis. The school first admitted girls in small numbers to the sixth form in 1971, prior to the establishment of College House in 1977, which housed 21 girls. In 1989 the decision was made to make the school fully co-educational, with girls entering the Lower Fourth (Year 7) in 1991. Having accommodated boarders since its inception, the final boarders left in July 1999.

== Activities ==
The school has an artist-in-residence and actor-in-residence, provides one-to-one LAMDA tuition and has several performance venues, including the Keyes Building, College Hall and the John Moore Theatre. Art exhibitions, plays, musicals, dance showcases and other performances are staged across the age range. Partly due to its links with the cathedral the school has a musical tradition.

The school has achieved success at rowing with the King's School Worcester Boat Club, and maintains a boathouse on the River Severn. The school also has an indoor swimming pool on the junior school campus and an outdoor pool at Hawford. Several sports undertake regular tours abroad.

== Year classification system ==
The school uses its own class nomenclature. In the main section of the school (ages 11–18), the classification runs as follows:

Year	Year Name	Notes
7	Lower Fourth (L4)	The Start of the Senior School.
8	Upper Fourth (U4)	The Year which determines who are awarded King's and Queen's Scholarships.
9	Lower Remove (LR)	The start of the house system.
10	Upper Remove (UR)	The start of the GCSE course.
11	Fifth Form (FF)	GCSE exams taken.
12	Lower Sixth (L6)	AS-level exams taken.
13	Upper Sixth (U6)	A2-level exams taken.

== Old Vigornians ==
All former pupils are considered to be Old Vigornians, and can use the post-nominal letters OV. Predecessor institutions are not considered: only those who attended King's from its refoundation in 1541 onwards are listed below.

Politics and Law:
Edward Winslow	(1595–1655)	Pilgrim Father, Governor of Plymouth Colony, Massachusetts
Sir John Vaughan	(1603–1674)	Judge and statesman, Chief Justice of the Common Pleas
Lord Somers	(1651–1716)	Lawyer and statesman, Lord Chancellor
John Porter-Porter	(1855–1939)	Politician, Senator (Ulster Unionist) in the Senate of Northern Ireland
Sir Stephen Tomlinson	(born 1952)	Judge, Lord Justice of Appeal
Sir Julian Flaux	(born 1955)	Judge, Lord Justice of Appeal, Chancellor of the High Court
Richard Bacon	(born 1962)	Politician, MP (Conservative) for South Norfolk
Sir Ashley Fox	(born 1969)	Politician, MEP (Conservative) for South West England, leader of the Conservatives in the European parliament
Public Service:
Sir Jack Longland	(1905–1993)	Educational administrator, mountain climber, broadcaster
Sir Richard Tilt	(born 1944)	Director General of HM Prison Service, Chairman of the Social Security Advisory Committee
Lord Garden	(1944–2007)	RAF Air Marshal, Assistant Chief of the Air Staff; Director of Chatham House
Clergy:
Roger Maynwaring	(1582–1653)	Dean of Worcester and Bishop of St David's, chaplain to Charles I
Thomas Warmestry	(1610–1665)	Dean of Worcester
Anthony Williams	(1892–1975)	Bishop of Bermuda
Seiriol Evans	(1894–1984)	Dean of Gloucester
Sir Philip Strong	(1899–1983)	Bishop of New Guinea and Archbishop of Brisbane
Alistair Magowan	(born 1955)	Bishop of Ludlow
Academia and Education:
Robert Harris	(1581–1658)	President of Trinity College, Oxford, member of the Westminster Assembly
Hannibal Potter	(1592–1664)	President of Trinity College, Oxford, royalist
William Dugard	(1606–1662)	Schoolmaster, textbook writer and publisher, associate of John Milton
Thomas Good	(1609–1678)	Master of Balliol College, Oxford
Thomas Hall	(1610–1665)	Schoolmaster, radical presbyterian clergyman
Alexander Pearce Higgins	(1865–1935)	International law scholar; Professor, London School of Economics, University of Cambridge
Martin Lowson	(1938–2013)	Aeronautical engineer; Professor, University of Bristol
Godfrey Hewitt	(1940–2013)	Evolutionary biologist; Professor, University of East Anglia
Anthony J. Culyer	(born 1942)	Economist specialising in health policy; Professor, University of York, University of Toronto
Commerce and Industry:
Dr John Wall	(1708–1776)	Physician, founder of the Royal Worcester porcelain company
Tony Garrett	(1918–2017)	Businessman, Chairman of Imperial Tobacco
Lord Wolfson	(1927–2010)	Businessman and philanthropist, Chairman of GUS
Sir Geoffrey Mulcahy	(born 1942)	Businessman, Chief Executive of Kingfisher plc
Literature:
Samuel Butler	(1613–1680)	Poet and satirist, author of Hudibras
Treadway Russell Nash	(1724–1811)	Worcestershire antiquarian and historian
Jonathan Raban	(1942–2023)	Travel writer and literary critic
Edward Kemp	(born 1965)	Playwright and theatre director, Director of RADA
Music: The school produced several notable musicians under the organist Harry Bramma (Director of Music 1965–76).
Hugh Blair	(1864–1932)	Organist of Worcester Cathedral and Holy Trinity Church, Marylebone; composer
Sir Stephen Cleobury	(1948–2019)	Organist, Director of Music at King's College, Cambridge
Nicholas Cleobury	(born 1950)	Organist, conductor of the Britten Sinfonia and the Oxford Bach Choir
Andrew Millington	(born 1952)	Organist, Director of Music at Guildford Cathedral and Exeter Cathedral
Stephen Darlington	(born 1952)	Organist, Director of Music at St Albans Cathedral and Christ Church, Oxford
Jonathan Darlington	(born 1956)	Conductor of the Duisburg Philharmonic Orchestra and music director of Vancouver Opera
Adrian Partington	(born 1958)	Organist, Director of Music at Gloucester Cathedral and artistic director of the BBC National Chorus of Wales
Geoffrey Webber	(born 1959)	Organist, Director of Music at Gonville and Caius College, Cambridge
Jonathan Nott	(born 1962)	Music Director of the Orchestre de la Suisse Romande and the Tokyo Symphony Orchestra
Allan Clayton	(born 1981)	Operatic tenor
Acting and Comedy:
Samuel Foote	(1720–1777)	Comic actor and dramatist
Clifford Rose	(1929–2021)	Actor: Secret Army, Wallis & Edward
Rik Mayall	(1958–2014)	Comedian and actor: The Young Ones, The New Statesman, Bottom
Jonathan Dow	(born 1965)	Actor: No Job for a Lady, The Bill, Cardiac Arrest
Journalism and Broadcasting:
Clive Everton	(1937–2024)	BBC snooker commentator, journalist and author
Chris Tarrant	(born 1946)	Television and radio broadcaster, host of Who Wants to Be a Millionaire?
Jeremy Thompson	(born 1947)	Journalist, news presenter for Sky News
Mark Webster	(born 1953)	Journalist, news correspondent for ITN
Will Buxton	(born 1981)	Formula One presenter and reporter for Liberty Media
Cameron Walker	(born)	Journalist, Royal Correspondent for GB News
Sport:
Harry Bentley	(1917–1991)	International golfer for England and Walker Cup winner
Brian Brain	(1940–2023)	Cricketer for Worcestershire
Derek Bell	(born 1941)	Racing driver
David Townsend	(born 1955)	Rower, bronze medallist at the 1980 Olympics
Luke Narraway	(born 1983)	Rugby union player for Gloucester Rugby, USA Perpignan, London Irish, Coventry R.F.C. and England
Zac Purchase	(born 1986)	Rower, gold medallist at the 2008 Olympics and silver medallist at the 2012 Olympics
Hayley Simmonds	(born 1988)	Racing cyclist
Lizzy Banks	(born 1990)	Racing cyclist
Josh Tongue	(born 1997)	Cricketer for Worcestershire and England
Miscellaneous/Eccentric:
Sir Edward Kelley	(1555–1597/98)	Occultist and spirit medium
Francis Potter	(1594–1678)	Clergyman, theorist on the Number of the Beast and on blood transfusion
Tim Dinsdale	(1924–1987)	Loch Ness Monster hunter

== See also ==
- List of English and Welsh endowed schools (19th century)
