= Samuel Butler (poet) =

English poet and satirist (1613–1680)

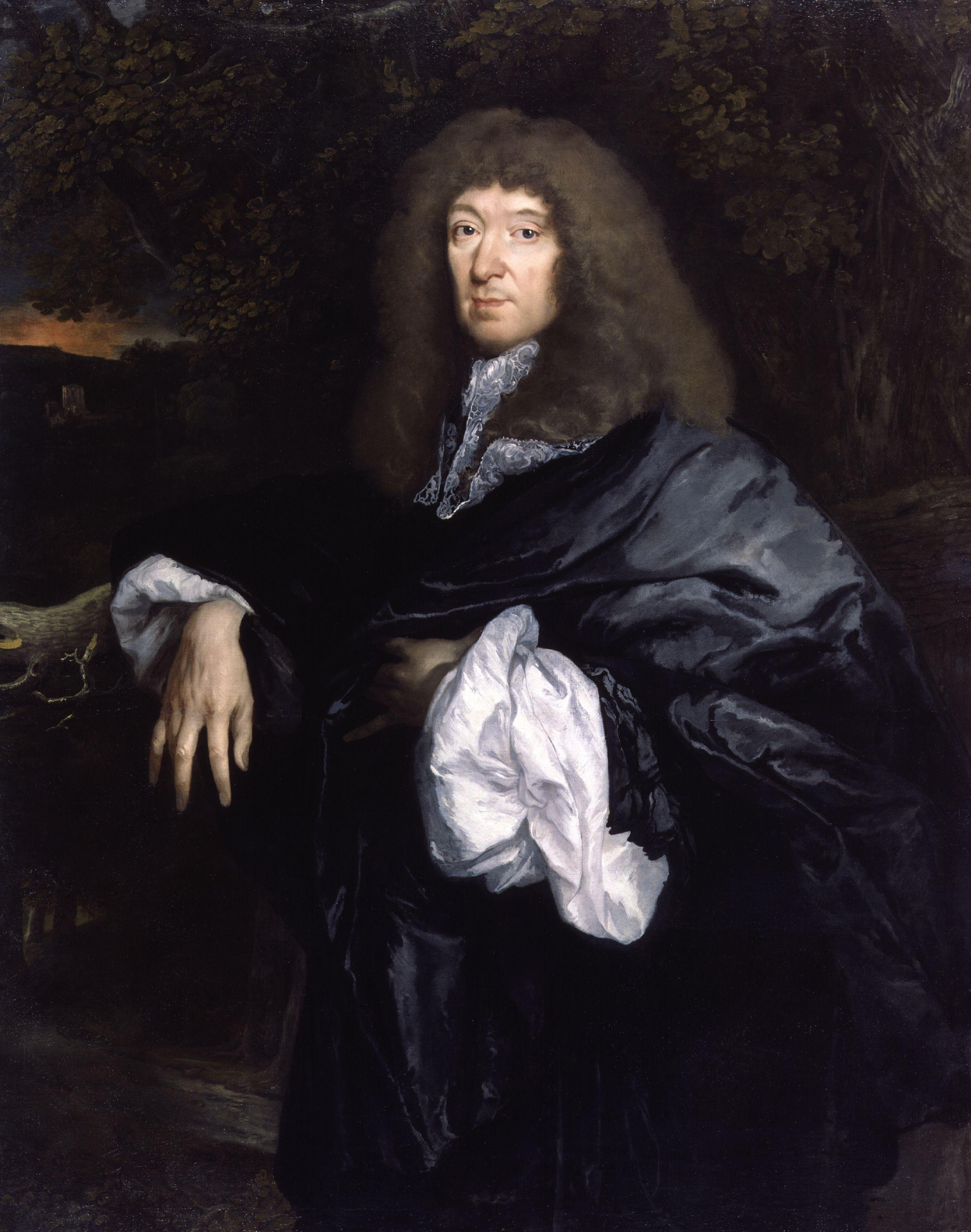
- Portrait of Butler by Pieter Borsseler
- Born: baptized 14 February 1613; Strensham, Worcestershire, England
- Died: 25 September 1680 (aged 67); London, England
- Notable work: Hudibras (1663–1678)

Samuel Butler (baptized 14 February 1613 – 25 September 1680) was an English poet and satirist. He is remembered now chiefly for a long satirical poem titled Hudibras.

== Early life and education ==
Samuel Butler was born in Strensham, Worcestershire, and was the son of a farmer and churchwarden, also named Samuel, and his wife Mary. His date of birth is unknown, but there is documentary evidence for the date of his baptism of 14 February. The date of Butler's baptism is given as 8 February by Treadway Russell Nash in his 1793 edition of Hudibras. Nash had already mentioned Butler in his Collections for a History of Worcestershire (1781), and perhaps because the latter date seemed to be a revised account, it has been repeated by many writers and editors. However, the parish register of Strensham records under the year 1612: "Item was christened Samuell Butler the sonne of Samuell Butler the xiiijth of February anno ut supra". Lady Day, 25 March, was New Year's Day in England at the time, so the year of his baptism was 1613 according to the change of the start of the year with the Calendar Act of 1750 (see Old Style and New Style dates). Nash also claims in his 1793 edition of Hudibras that Butler's father entered his son's baptism into the register, an error that was also repeated in later publications; however, the entry was clearly written by a different hand.

Butler was brought up in the household of Sir William Russell of Strensham and became his clerk. "When just a Boy he would make observations and reflections on every Thing one sayd or did, and censure it to be either well or ill. He was never at the University for the reason alleged." He was educated at the King's School, Worcester, under Henry Bright whose teaching is recorded favourably by Thomas Fuller, a contemporary writer, in his Worthies of England. In early youth he was a servant to the Countess of Kent. Through Lady Kent he met her steward, the jurist John Selden who influenced his later writings. He also tried his hand at painting but was reportedly not very good at it; one of his editors reporting that "his pictures served to stop windows and save the tax" (on window glass). Conversely, John Aubrey who knew Butler quite well enough to be one of his pallbearers, wrote that "He was thinking once to have made painting his Profession. His love to and skill in painting made a great friendship between him and Mr. Samuel Cowper (The Prince of Limners of this Age)." He studied law but did not practice.

== Career ==
After the Restoration he became secretary, or steward, to Richard Vaughan, 2nd Earl of Carbery, Lord President of Wales, which entailed living at least a year in Ludlow, Shropshire, until January 1662 while he was paying craftsmen working on repairing the castle there. In late 1662 the first part of Hudibras, which he began writing when lodging at Holborn, London, in 1658 and continued to work on while in Ludlow, was published, and the other two in 1664 and 1678 respectively. One early purchaser of the first two parts was Samuel Pepys. While the diarist acknowledged that the book was the "greatest fashion", he could not see why it was found to be so witty.

Despite the popularity of Hudibras, Butler was not offered a place at Court. "Satyrical Witts disoblige whom they converse with; and consequently make to themselves many Enemies and few Friends; and this was his manner and case." However, Butler is thought to have been in the employment of the Duke of Buckingham in the summer of 1670, and accompanied him on a diplomatic mission to France. Butler also received financial support in the form of a grant from King Charles II.

During the latter part of his life, Butler lived in a house in the now partially demolished Rose Street, to the west of Covent Garden.

== Death ==
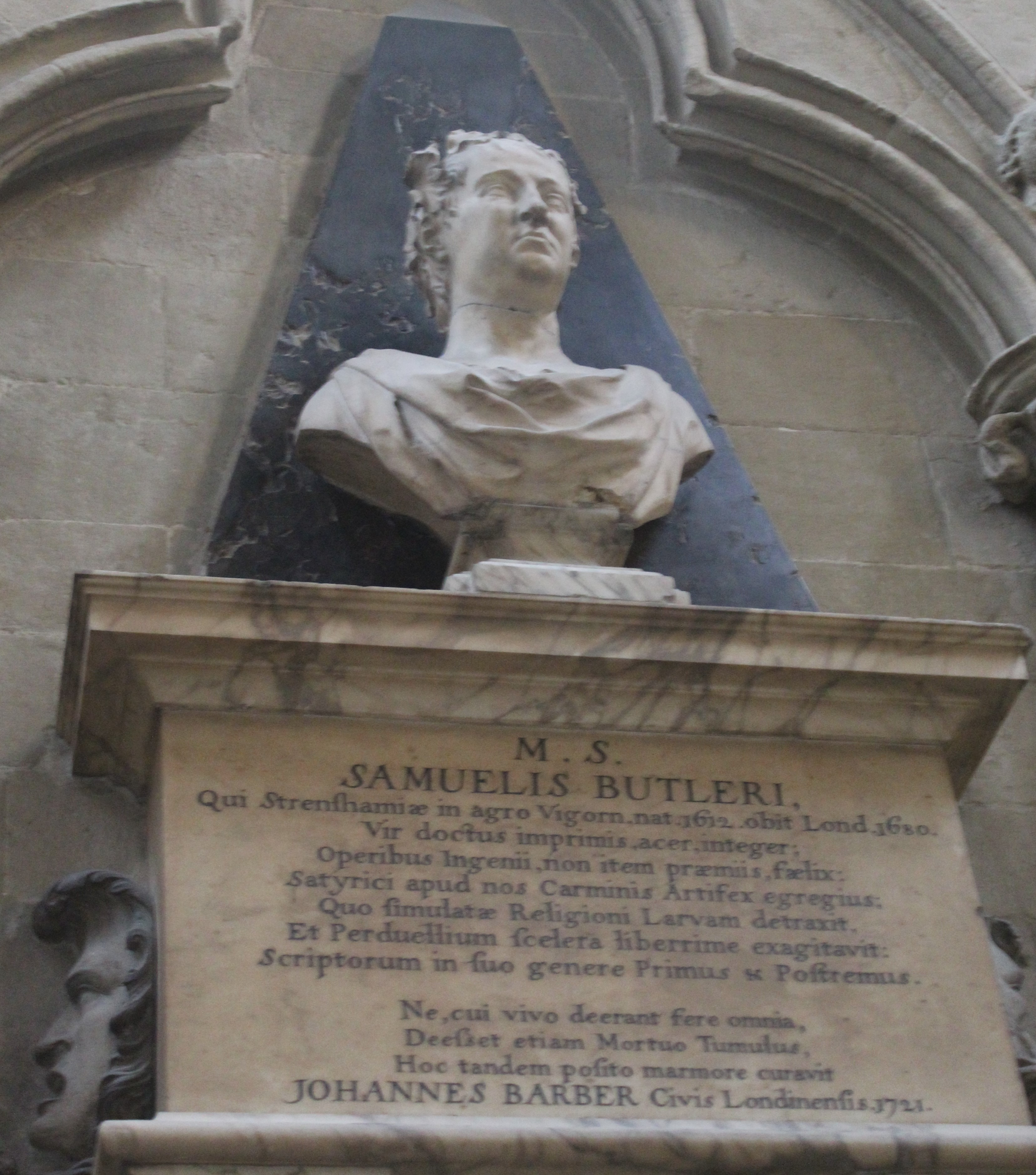
Memorial to Butler, Westminster Abbey

Butler died of consumption on 25 September 1680, and was buried on 27 September in the Church-yard of St. Paul's, Covent Garden; in the north part next to the church at the east end. "His feet touch the wall. His grave 2 yards distant from the Pillaster of the Dore (by his desire) 6 feet deep" at the expense of a Mr. Longueville, although he was not in debt when he died. Aubrey in Brief Lives describes his grave as "being in the north part next to the church at the east end ... 2 yards distant from the pillaster of the dore". Also, a monument to him was placed in Westminster Abbey in 1732 by a printer, John Barber, and the Lord Mayor of London. There is also a memorial plaque to him in the small village church of Strensham, Worcestershire, near the town of Upton upon Severn, his birthplace.

== Works ==
=== Hudibras ===
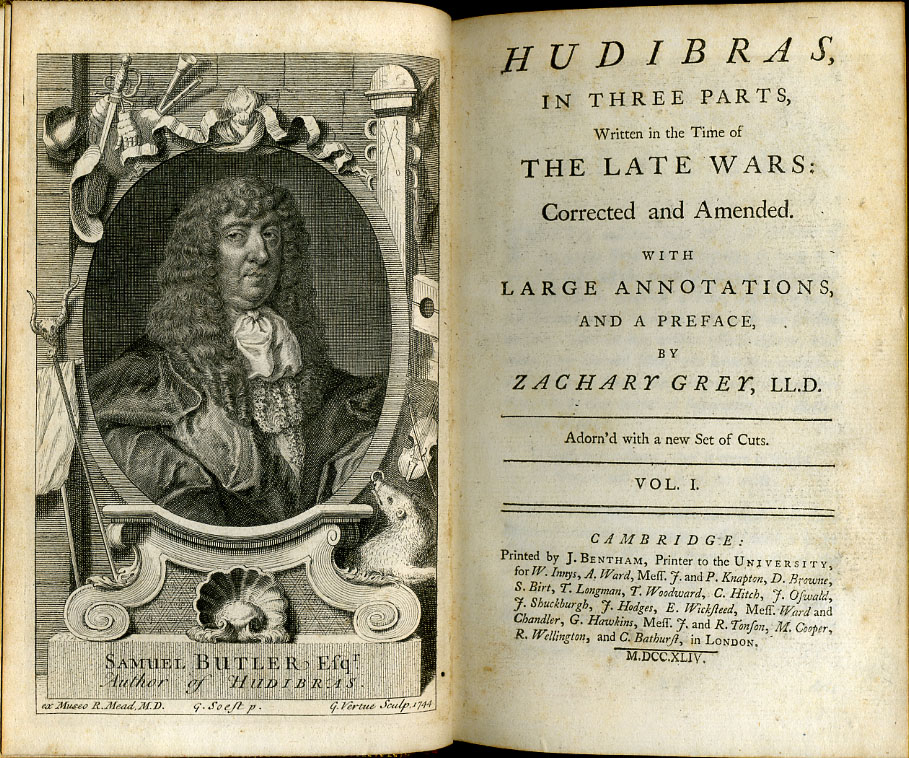
Frontispiece and titlepage of a 1744 illustrated and annotated edition of Butler's Hudibras

Hudibras is directed against religious sectarianism. The poem was very popular in its time, and several of its phrases have passed into the dictionary. It was sufficiently popular to spawn imitators. Hudibras takes some of its characterization from Don Quixote but, unlike that work, it has many more references to personalities and events of the day. Butler was also influenced by satirists such as John Skelton and Paul Scarron's Virgile travesti; a satire on classical literature, particularly Virgil.

Hudibras was reprinted many times in the centuries following Butler's death. Two of the more noteworthy editions are those edited by Zachery Grey (1744) and Treadway Russell Nash (1793). The standard edition of the work was edited by John Wilders (1967).

=== Other writings ===
Most of his other writings never saw print until they were collected and published by Robert Thyer in 1759. Butler wrote many short biographies, epigrams and verses, the earliest surviving from 1644. Of his verses, the best known is "The Elephant on the Moon", about a mouse trapped in a telescope, a satire on Sir Paul Neale of the Royal Society. Butler's taste for the mock heroic is shown by another early poem Cynarctomachy, or Battle between Bear and Dogs, which is both a homage to and a parody of a Greek poem ascribed to Homer, Batrachomyomachia. He wrote the poem Upon Philip Nye's Thanksgiving Beard about the Puritan Philip Nye and later also mentioned him in Hudibras. His supposed lack of money later in life is strange as he had numerous unpublished works which could have offered him income including a set of Theophrastan character sketches which were not printed until 1759. Many other works are dubiously attributed to him.

Several other works are dubiously attributed to him, among them the 1706 Dildoides: A Burlesque Poem, printed under his name but rejected by modern scholarship.
