= Peter Wright (organist) =

British organist

Peter Michael Wright (born 6 March 1954) is a British organist.

== Life and career ==
Born in Hertfordshire, Wright was educated at Highgate School before continuing his studies at the Royal College of Music, studying organ with Richard Popplewell and piano with Angus Morrison. As an organ scholar at Emmanuel College, Cambridge, between 1973 and 1976, he pursued his organ studies with Gillian Weir and Flor Peeters.

Wright was sub-organist of Guildford Cathedral and, from 1989 to 2019, served as organist and director of music at Southwark Cathedral.

He served as President of the Royal College of Organists from 2005 to 2008 and became a Fellow of the Royal School of Church Music in 2011.

Cultural offices
Preceded by Harry Bramma	Organist and Master of the Choristers of Southwark Cathedral; 1989–2019	Succeeded by Ian Keatley
