= Hannibal Potter =

17th-century clergyman and president of Trinity College Oxford

Hannibal Potter (1592–1664) was an English clergyman and college head in Oxford during the First English Civil War. He was removed as president of Trinity College, Oxford in 1648 by the Parliamentary visitors, regaining the position in 1660.

== Life ==
The son of Richard Potter, a prebendary of Worcester Cathedral, Hannibal Potter was educated at the King's School, Worcester under Henry Bright. He matriculated from Trinity College, Oxford, in 1607, was elected scholar in 1609, graduated B.A. in 1611, M.A. in 1614, B.D. in 1621, and D.D. in 1630; in 1613 he was elected Fellow of Trinity. He was presented to the livings of Over Worton, Oxfordshire, and Wootton, Northamptonshire, in 1620, and was preacher at Gray's Inn from 1635. He was tutor to Henry Gellibrand.

On 8 August 1643 he was admitted president of Trinity by the visitor, Walter Curle as Bishop of Winchester, after a contested election, in which William Chillingworth is said to have had a majority of votes; Potter had been a chaplain to Curle. During most of his tenure Oxford was the headquarters of the royalist forces; the college was almost empty and close to bankruptcy. College life was far from normal, with admissions of only a very few students, but the first child of Ann Fanshawe and Sir Richard Fanshawe was born there.

Potter was pro-vice-chancellor during the parliamentary visitation of 1647, and showed some ingenuity in obstructing the visitors. On 13 April he was deprived of the office of president by the parliamentary chancellor of Oxford, Philip Herbert, 4th Earl of Pembroke. At the same time he was deprived of Garsington, a benefice attached to the presidency, and subsequently endured financial hardship. He obtained the curacy of Broomfield, Somerset, but he was soon turned out, for reading The Book of Common Prayer. He was restored to his offices in 1660, and died on 1 September 1664, being buried in the chapel of Trinity College.

== Family ==
His brother Francis was an experimentalist, numerologist and clergyman. During Hannibal's presidency, Francis was at work in his rooms in Trinity with William Harvey.

== Notes ==
Academic offices
Preceded by Ralph Kettell	President of Trinity College, Oxford; 1643–1648	Succeeded by Robert Harris
Preceded by Seth Ward	President of Trinity College, Oxford; 1660–1664	Succeeded by Ralph Bathurst
