= William Hawes (Trinity) =

English academic

William Hawes (18 March 1620 - 12 September 1659) was an English academic.

Dobson was educated at Trinity College, Oxford, becoming a Fellow in 1642. He was President of Trinity from 1658 until his death. He is buried in the churchyard at Garsington.

Academic offices
| Preceded by Robert Harris | President of Trinity College, Oxford; 1658–1659 | Succeeded by Seth Ward |
