= Rake (stock character) =

Man habituated to immoral conduct

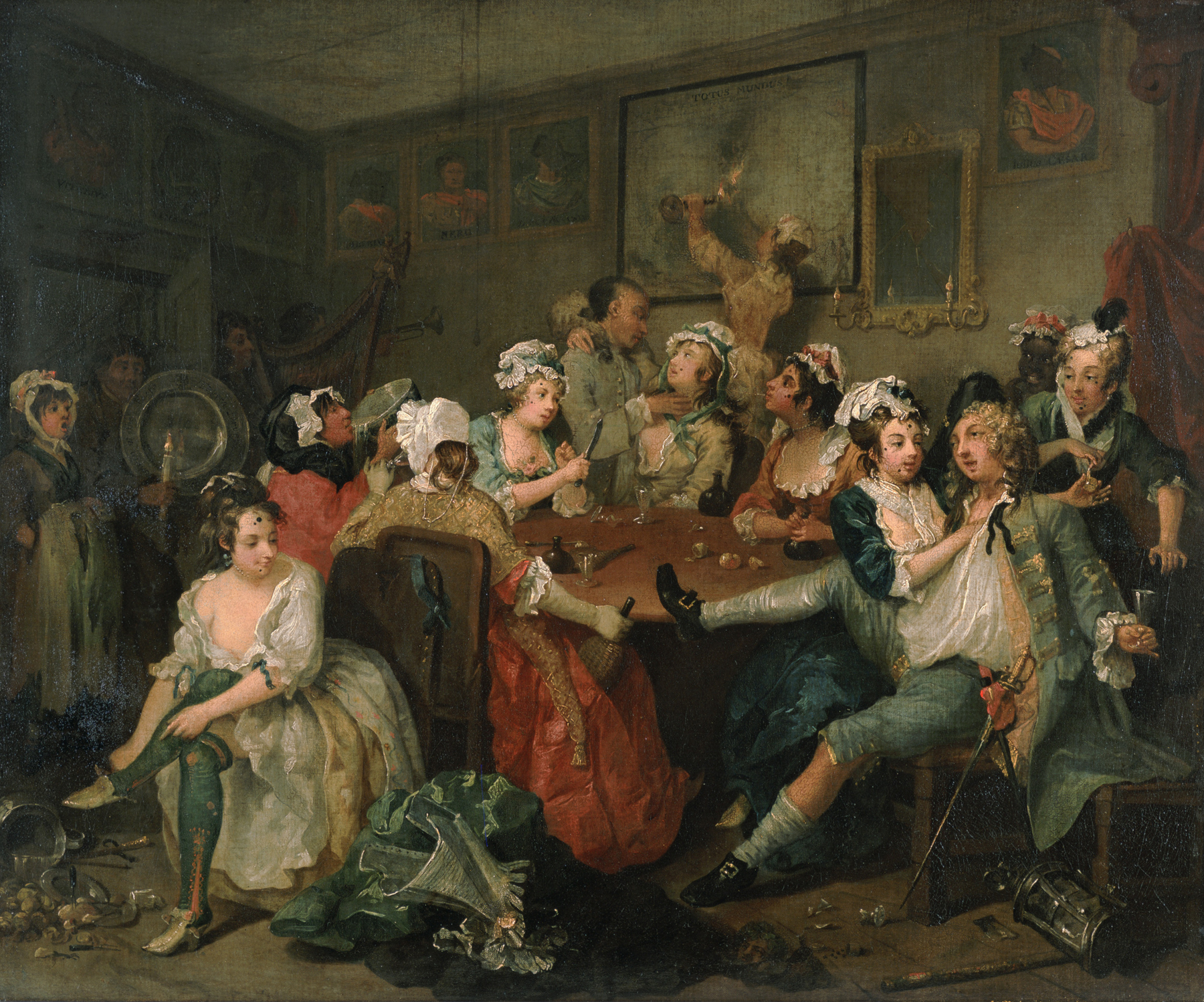
A Rake's Progress, 3: The Tavern Scene, 1732–1733 painting depicting several rakes in a London tavern

In a historical context, a rake (short for rakehell, analogous to "hellraiser") was a man who was habituated to immoral conduct, particularly womanizing. Often, a rake was also prodigal, wasting his (usually inherited) fortune on gambling, wine, women, and song, and incurring massive debts in the process. Cad is a closely related term. Comparable terms are "libertine", "roué" and "debauchee".

The Restoration rake was a carefree, witty, sexually irresistible aristocrat whose heyday was during the Stuart Restoration period (1660–1688) at the court of King Charles II. They were typified by the "Merry Gang" of courtiers, who included as prominent members John Wilmot, George Villiers, and Charles Sackville, who combined riotous living with intellectual pursuits and patronage of the arts. At this time the rake featured as a stock character in Restoration comedy.

After the reign of Charles II, and especially after the Glorious Revolution of 1688, the cultural perception of the rake took a dive into squalor. The rake became the butt of moralistic tales, in which his typical fate was debtors' prison, venereal disease, or, in the case of William Hogarth's A Rake's Progress, insanity in Bedlam.

== History ==
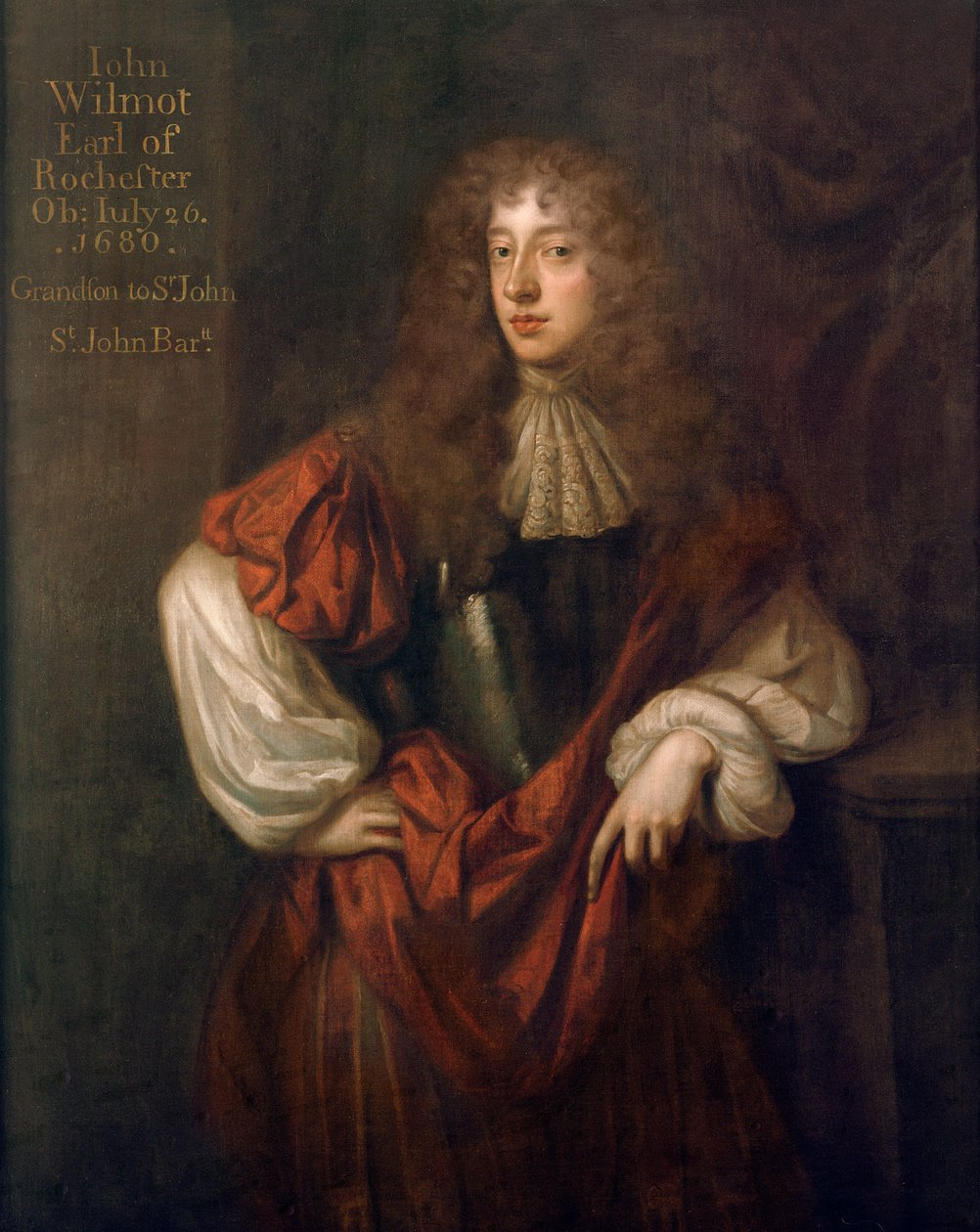
Lord Rochester, the most infamous of the Restoration rakes

The defining period of the rake was at the court of Charles II in the late 1600s. Dubbed the "Merry Gang" by poet Andrew Marvell, their members included King Charles, George Villiers, John Wilmot, Charles Sedley, Charles Sackville, and playwrights William Wycherley and George Etherege. Following the tone set by the monarch, these men distinguished themselves in drinking, womanizing, and witty conversation, with Wilmot, the Earl of Rochester, outdoing all the rest.

Many of them were inveterate gamblers and brawlers. Some were duelists, but not with the approval of King Charles, who discouraged the practice of dueling. Highlights of their careers include Sedley and Sackville preaching naked to a crowd from an alehouse balcony in Covent Garden, as they simulated sex with each other. A lowlight was Buckingham's killing of Francis Talbot in a duel for Talbot's wife. In 1682, Thomas Wharton broke into a church at night and relieved himself against the communion table and in the pulpit.

In the 1700s, a later group of aristocratic rakes were associated with the Hellfire Club. These included Francis Dashwood and John Wilkes.

Other rakes include Francis Charteris, Alessandro Cagliostro, Lord Byron, James Burton Junior, the Egyptologist, Jimi Arundell, John Mytton, Giacomo Casanova, Charles Mohun, the Marquis de Sade, Robert Fielding, and Beauchamp Bagenal.

== In restoration comedy ==
Within restoration comedies, rakes may be subdivided into the penitent and persistent ones, the first being reformed by the heroine, the latter pursuing their immoral conduct. Libertinistic attitudes, such as (sexual) licentiousness, alcoholism, vagrancy, cheating and gambling, can be discerned in characters belonging to the satiric norm as well as to the satiric scene. Only the degree of wit brings the rakish gentleman, the Truewit, closer to the satiric norm, whereas Falsewits are always exploded in the satiric scene. The motivation of a rake to change his libertine ways is either hypocritical (falsewits) or honest (truewits). In other words, penitent rakes among the falsewits only abandon their way of life for financial reasons. Penitent truewits ever so often succumb to the charms of the witty heroine and, at least, go through the motions of vowing constancy.

Another typology distinguishes between the "polite rake" and the "debauch", using criteria of social class and style. In this case, the young, witty, and well-bred male character, who dominates the drawing rooms, is in sharp contrast to a contemptible debauch, who indulges in fornication, alcoholism, and hypocrisy.

Other assessments of the libertine concentrate on the kind and intensity of libertine demeanor. Here, the rake falls into any one of three categories: extravagant libertine, vicious libertine, and philosophical libertine.

The extravagant rake is characterized by anti-normative conduct throughout, even though he finally settles down in matrimony. Between 1663 and 1668, examples are Wellbred in James Howard's The English Mounsieur (1663/64), Philidor in James Howard's All Mistaken (1665/1672), and Celadon in Dryden's Secret Love (1667). In the 1690s, Sir Harry Wildair in George Farquhar's The Constant Couple (1699) represents this kind of gentlemanly rake. The extravagant rake is as promiscuous and impulsive as he is wild and frivolous, and he finally finds his match in an equally extravagant and witty heroine. He is, above all, a self-aware character who "is what he wants to be", who delights in those qualities "with which he is endowed", and who provides "carnival release". Thus, the extravagant rake is a comic figure because his actions are exaggerated. But he is never a comic fool.

The vicious rake is invariably presented as a despicable, if wealthy person, who thrives on scheming and intrigue. He is frequently married and abuses his wife. Examples are Pinchwife in The Country Wife and Sir John Brute in John Vanbrugh's The Provoked Wife.

The philosophical rake, the most attractive libertine figure, is characterized by self-control and refined behavior and a capacity for manipulating others. His pronounced libertine leanings are not supposed to contribute anything to the comic development of the plot. Rather, his libertinism is serious, reflecting the philosophical principles of the pleasure-seeking, cynical Court Wits. It is this kind of libertinism that has secured the notoriety of William Wycherley's The Country Wife, George Etherege's The Man of Mode, and Sir Charles Sedley's Bellamira: or, The Mistress. Characters like Horner and Dorimant spring to mind but also Rodophil and Palamede in Dryden's Marriage-a-la-Mode, Longvil and Bruce in Thomas Shadwell's The Virtuoso and the eponymous heroine in Sedley's Bellamira.

These plays are not representative of the average Restoration comedy, however. The reform of the ordinary rakish gentleman is the common pattern for the ending of the play. Similarly, extravagant rakes enter into marriage. However, as soon as the persistence of the rakes remains almost unquestioned, it is difficult to decide whether libertines, no matter of what "colour", play a major part in their authors' satiric strategies. Although Etherege's Dorimant is "tamed" by Harriet, his conversion at the end is rather doubtful. Similarly, Wycherley's Horner is not punished satirically.

The libertine philosophy that the scintillating persistent rakes display seems to rebel against the narrow-mindedness and hypocrisy lurking behind the facade of Puritan honesty and bourgeois moral standards. It has been pointed out that the views of the philosophical libertine were strongly influenced by the philosophy of Thomas Hobbes. Hobbes was not necessarily an unquestioned ideal among the court élite, and Hobbesian ideas certainly did not permeate many comedies. John Dryden, for one, drew on Hobbesian ideas in his tragedies but these ideas are internalised by villains only.

In his pursuit of pleasure and sensual satisfaction, the philosophical libertine shows hedonistic, Epicurean, and anti-rationalist patterns of thought. In their ideal of life, the libertines of this order may almost be compared to the genius of a somewhat later time: like the genius, the libertine rake is anti-authoritarian, anti-normative, and anti-traditional.

It is, above all, the emotional distance from the objects of his desire and from the havoc he creates, which renders the persistent rake so frightening. Criticism of the libertine was heard in the 1670s when sex comedies were en vogue but also earlier, whenever the male partner of the gay couple was blamed for having indulged in immoral behaviour. One major counter-argument was the call for poetic justice.

Shadwell and Dryden, for example, discussed the necessity of poetic justice to punish dissoluteness in their plays. To reintroduce moral standards, the rake, they demanded, had to be reformed towards the end of the play. If a persistent rake was allowed to propagate his philosophical libertinism, "poetische Ungerechtigkeit" ("poetic injustice") was likely to threaten the norm. Shadwell's Epsom Wells may be regarded as a chief instigator of an excessive libertinism which is not questioned. The play, significantly, ends with a divorce rather than the standard device of a marriage.

However, the number of persistent rakes continued to grow, together with an upsurge in cuckolding action, and, between 1672 and 1687, not all persistent rake characters were punished satirically. Only towards the end of the century did the increasing criticism of dramatic immorality and obscenity make the authors return to more traditional moral standards. In 1688, Shadwell's Squire of Alsatia initiated the return to a Horatian prodesse in comedy, which had already been put forth in the Preface to The Humorist (1671): "My design was it, to reprehend some of the Vices and Follies of the Age, which I take to be the most proper, and most useful way of writing Comedy" (The Complete Works of Thomas Shadwell, ed. Montague Summers, Vol. I, p. 183).

As a consequence, future emphasis was no longer on libertine adventures, but on the conversion and domestication of the dashing young men. Thomas d'Urfey's Love for Money (1691) and Colley Cibber's Love's Last Shift (1696) are moralizing plays and pave the way for the sentimental comedy of the early eighteenth century.

== In modern literature ==
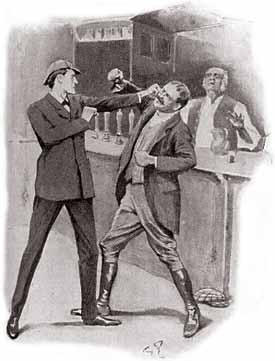
Sherlock Holmes knocks out the cad Woodley

The 19th and early 20th century successor to the rake was the Cad, famously played on the big screen by Terry-Thomas. Although presenting himself as a gentleman, this upper class villain sought to take advantage of the young heroine. Commonly known as the Dastardly Whiplash, the cad of the silent movie era was recognisable by his handlebar moustache, ivory cigarette holder, pinky ring, and spectator shoes. He usually held a British aristocracy title such as Sir or Lord, although French and American cads and swindlers were not uncommon.

If employed, the cad would often work as an army officer, professional gambler, hunter, billiards player, actor, politician, or aviator in later works set during the World War I era. He would often have a henchman from the criminal class employed as a manservant, coachman or chauffeur. The servant may have come from a long line of flunkys employed by the cad's ancestors, he may share his master's enjoyment of mischief, or he might have been of such coarse and disagreeable character that no decent old money family would employ him. If the servant is blamed for the failure of the cad's plans, he is frequently horsewhipped with a riding crop.

Typical turn of the century cad behaviour included adultery, blackmail, fornication, marrying for money (often bigamously), cheating at cards, gamesmanship at sporting events, and polishing his shoes to a mirror shine in order to look up ladies' skirts. If the cad failed to seduce or swindle the young heiress out of her inheritance, sometimes he would resort to more nefarious acts such as kidnapping, murder or a sham marriage against the girl's will, often with help from a defrocked priest of equally disreputable character.

When confronted by the hero, the cad was usually a coward who would run away rather than fight. Some of the best-known fictional cads are Harry Paget Flashman, George Wickham from Pride and Prejudice, James Steerforth from David Copperfield, Charles Augustus Milverton from The Return of Sherlock Holmes, Woodley from The Adventure of the Solitary Cyclist, Barkis Bittern from Corpse Bride, Victor Quatermain from Curse of the Were-Rabbit, and Count Olaf from A Series of Unfortunate Events.

The stereotype continues in modern romances with characters in novels by Jilly Cooper continuing the trope, such as the initial love interest in her novel Imogen.

== In popular culture ==
A 2004 episode of Jeopardy! with Ken Jennings as a contestant featured a clue with "What is a rake?" as the correct answer, the question being "This term for a long-handled gardening tool can also mean an immoral pleasure seeker." Jennings incorrectly answered "What's a hoe?", much to the shock of host Alex Trebek, who replied with "They teach you that in school in Utah, huh?" This incident has since become one of the most iconic moments in the show's history.

== See also ==
- Bad boy archetype
- Lovable rogue
- Don Giovanni, opera in two acts with music by Wolfgang Amadeus Mozart
- Fop
- Lad culture
- Nice guy
- Promiscuity
- Shamela, a novel that was a satire of Pamela
- Rake (Australian TV series)
- Rake (American TV series)
