= Stephen Tomlinson =

English barrister

The Right Honourable Sir Stephen Tomlinson

Lord Justice of Appeal
- In office 9 July 2010 – 10 January 2017
- Monarch: Queen Elizabeth II

Personal details
- Born: 29 March 1952 (age 74) Wolverhampton, West Midlands

Sir Stephen Miles Tomlinson PC (born 29 March 1952) is an English barrister and former Lord Justice of Appeal.

== Career ==
Tomlinson born 29 March 1952 to Enoch Tomlinson and Mary Tomlinson (née Miles). He was educated at the King's School, Worcester and Worcester College, Oxford. He was called to the Bar in 1974 (Inner Temple). From 1974 to 1976, he was a lecturer in law at Worcester College.

Tomlinson became a Queen's Counsel in 1988. Throughout his career as a barrister, he practised at 7 King's Bench Walk. He was head of chambers from 1995 to 2000.

He was appointed a Recorder in 1995 and a Deputy High Court judge in 1996. In 2000, he was appointed to the High Court of Justice, receiving the customary knighthood, and was assigned to the Queen's Bench Division. On 9 July 2010, Tomlinson became a Lord Justice of Appeal, and received the customary appointment to the Privy Council in 2011. He retired from the bench in 2017 and currently works as an arbitrator.

== Personal life ==
Tomlinson married Joanna Greig and has one son and one daughter.

== See also ==
- List of Lords Justices of Appeal
