= Dildoides =

1706 burlesque poem

Dildoides: A Burlesque Poem
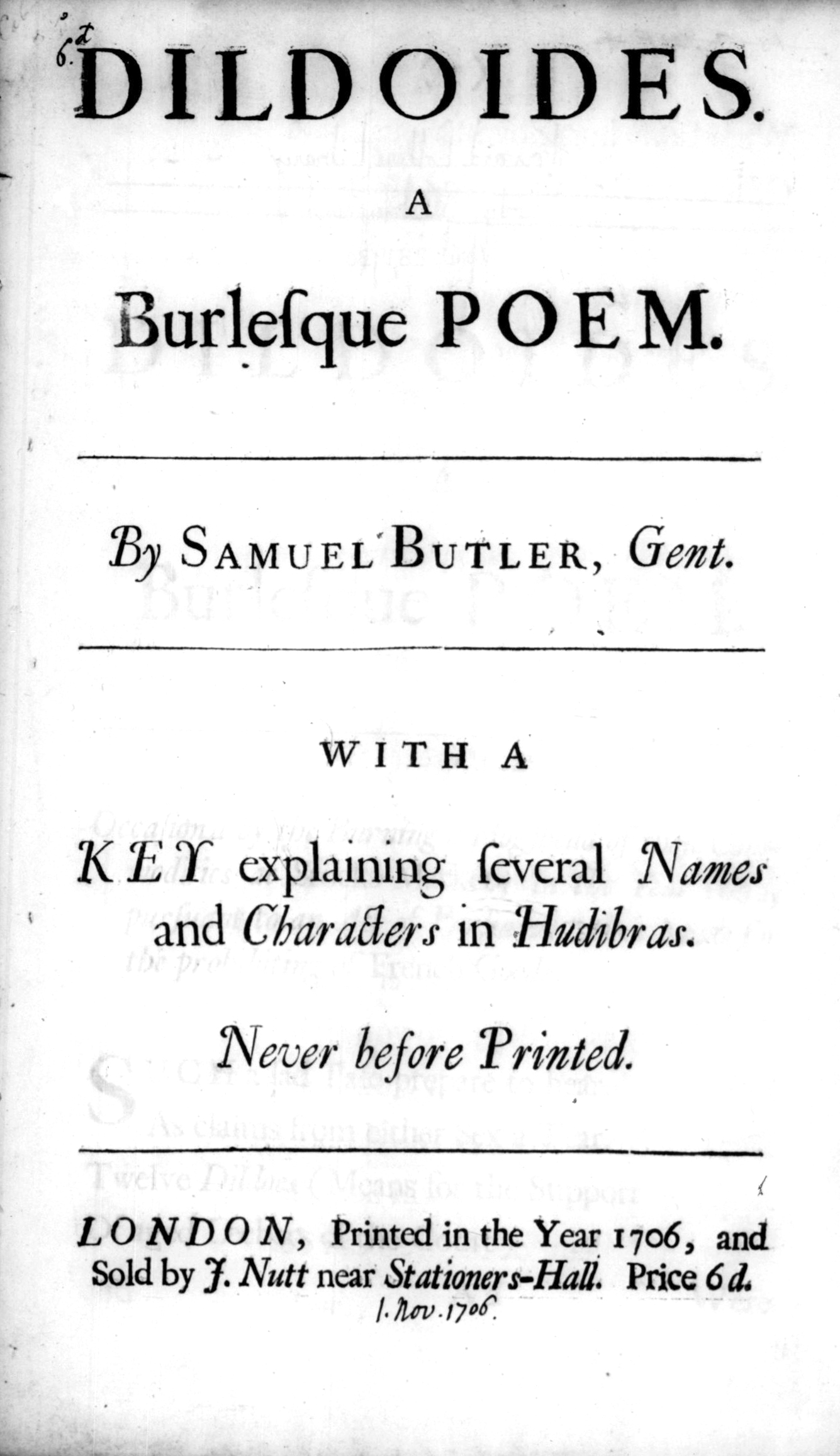
- Title page
- Author: Samuel Butler (disputed); Charles Sedley (proposed)
- Language: English
- Genre: Burlesque; satire
- Publisher: J. Nutt
- Publication date: 1706
- Publication place: England
- Media type: Print
- Pages: 14

Dildoides: A Burlesque Poem is a 1706 work attributed on its title page to Samuel Butler, about a collection of dildos that was seized and destroyed by the authorities. The poem circulated widely in manuscript as a bawdy satire. Modern scholarship rejects the attribution to Butler and has sometimes credited the poem instead to Sir Charles Sedley, who is named in the manuscript miscellany of Sir William Haward.
