= Bellamira (Sedley play) =

Bellamira: or, The Mistress is a comedy by Sir Charles Sedley, published in 1687, partly modelled on Terence's Eunuchus.

== Stage history and reception ==
Ascertaining the exact number of performances of Bellamira presents some problems. It is a fact that Bellamira was performed by the United Company in the Drury Lane Theatre on 12 May 1687. Bellamira may also have been performed in the Dorset Garden Theatre. However, as it was a standard play, without fancy scenery or machinery, the Drury Lane Theatre is the most likely place of performance. According to The London Stage, 12 May, however, may not be regarded as the première. It is uncertain how many performances followed in the season of 1687/88, and there may have been a revival of the play in the season of 1690/91.

At least two sources testify that Bellamira was not a failure in spite of obvious criticism from parts of the audience. The first testimony is that of Thomas Shadwell, who, in his Tenth Satyr of Juvenal (1687), which is dedicated to Sedley, thanks Sir Charles for his patronage, adding: "Your late great obligation in giving me the advantage of your Comedy, call’d Bellamira, or the Mistress, has given me a fresh subject for my Thanks ... I am heartily glad that your Comedy (as I never doubted) found such success, that I never met with any Man of Sence but applauded it" (The Complete Works of Thomas Shadwell, ed. Montague Summers, Vol. V, p. 291). The phrase "advantage" here presumably means that Sedley offered Shadwell, a Whig out of favour and debarred from the theatre in the mid-1680s, the third night's income to support him. If this is correct, Bellamira was performed more often than two times.

The second source of the play's success is that it went into print within six weeks after the première. However, instant publication does not necessarily speak in favour of a play's success, since even prompt copies of unsuccessful plays were sent to the printer.

Evidence about the success of Bellamira is not consistent, however. In his Preface to Bellamira, Sedley himself refers to a rather cool reception of his comedy. He seems to have attributed this to a latent element of obscenity. In Sedley's view, female spectators with their increasing demand for morals and manners on the stage, showed a particular dislike of this kind of lasciviousness in comedy.

Contemporary authors who spoke in favour of Bellamira again include Shadwell and George Etherege. Shadwell defended Bellamira from the charge of obscenity. Etherege, who served as diplomat at the Imperial Court in Ratisbon between 1685 and 1689 and was bored there, apparently found reading Bellamira a welcome change.

Bellamira saw no further editions after 1687. This means that it cannot have been a smash hit. Nor does it occur in the list of the most successful plays between 1660 and 1747 which were still performed after 1900. And yet, Bellamira was adapted by Robin Chapman and broadcast on 18 March 1975 by Thames Television under the title "Way of the World: Bellamira".

== (Stock) characters and couples ==
- Merryman and Thisbe (Falstaffian drunkard meets Bellamira's confidante)
- Keepwell and Bellamira (Fool meets scheming heroine)
- Dangerfield and Bellamira (miles gloriosus is fooled by scheming heroine)
- Lionel and Isabella (alleged eunuch and excessive rake meets and rapes helpless ingénue)
- Cunningham (old syphilitic rake)
- Eustace (another rake, friend of Merryman)
- Smoothly (Dangerfield's servant)
- Pisquil (the real eunuch)
- Silence and Betty (servant girls)

== Inversion of traditional hierarchies in the plot ==
Bellamira is full of relationships and affairs, and only one couple is married on stage while more marriages are only planned for the future. However, all the marriages are doubtful as to how close they function as satiric norm(s). Traditional hierarchies and ties of interdependence are inverted. Previously unprivileged members of society dominate the plot. The ones formerly in power either have to pay for their status quo or have to submit to survive:

- Bellamira, the daughter of a bankrupt merchant, turns courtesan and takes advantage of her indulgent keeper's wealth to manipulate her male admirers from her luxurious residence.
- Isabella, a gentlewoman by birth, is degraded to a state of slavery: she is kidnapped as a child, bought by the bragging Dangerfield, sold as a present to Bellamira, kept by Bellamira as a pawn and finally raped by an overardent lover.
- Having originally come from an (impoverished) family of the gentry, Smoothly turns parasitic sycophant to serve his master, Dangerfield.
- Finally, the (alleged) eunuch turns out to be a rapist. It is Lionel's deed in particular that propels the plot and brings about the climactic effects in the play.
- Perhaps only Thisbe and Merryman are a match for each other, despite the moral deficiencies accompanying the couple. The proviso scene testifies to their mutual consent to marry each other at last. The marriage of Thisbe and Merryman, then, presents a norm, however limited, within the play. Both feel affection for one another, and their marriage is as free of (pretended) romanticism (Isabella / Lionel) as it is of deceptive selfishness (Bellamira / Keepwell).

== Criticism of competitive society ==
The criticism of contemporary society in Bellamira is achieved by satire and parody. The play presents the picture of a competitive society which is largely characterised by materialistic and cynical as well as libertinistic, if not nihilistic, tendencies. The society of Bellamira is morally corrupt and profit-seeking, degenerate, cunning and violent. Established standards of conduct, codes of honour and polite conversation all serve to cover up the prevalent hypocrisy.

== The motif of sterility and disease in the play ==
In Bellamira, a profit-seeking attitude has infected every aspect of life and ruined each relationship. Materialistic motives lead to arranged marriages devoid of feelings and love. The society delineated here is an ageing society not only morally deficient but also literally diseased: Bellamira is a veteran courtesan; Merryman an elderly drunkard; Cunningham a crumbling syphilitic wretch; Dangerfield an old-fashioned, impotent soldier in retirement. In addition to this picture of ageing and disease, the imagery of sterility receives special emphasis in the play: the device of the eunuch becomes the very symbol of the play, and thus, characteristics such as incompleteness and lack of fulfilment dominate the play. While characters like Dangerfield and Merryman suffer from physical impotence, others like Lionel are emotionally sterile. In his raving, Lionel commits a crime by raping the girl he professes to love. Keepwell, too, who is ruled by a courtesan, seems less than a man. The pervasive animal imagery underlines this impression: Pisquil, the real eunuch, is called "Humane Gelding," Dangerfield "gelt" by Bellamira, and Merryman refers to him as "Gib’d Cat," that is, gelded cat. In a final piece of irony, the lean Cunningham refers to himself as a "Capon," that is, gelded cock.

== Edition ==
- Quarto edition of 1687, printed by D[avid] Mallet.
- The Works of the Honourable Sir Charles Sedley. 2 vols (London, 1776).

== Modern edition ==
- Holger Hanowell, Sir Charles Sedley's "The Mulberry-Garden" (1668) and "Bellamira: or, The Mistress" (1687). An Old-Spelling Critical Edition with an Introduction and a Commentary (Frankfurt a.M., 2001)
