= Seth Ward (bishop of Salisbury) =

English mathematician, astronomer and bishop

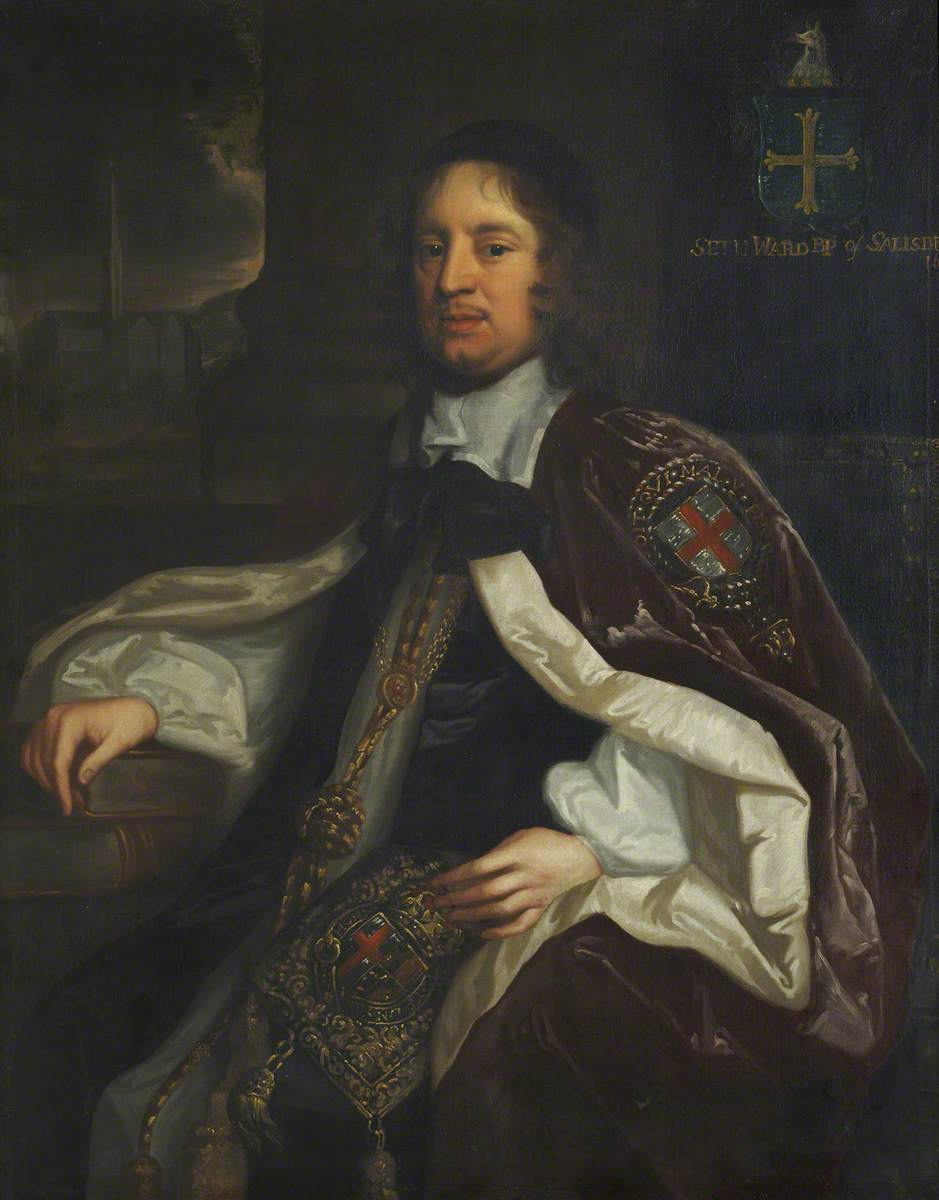
- Bishop Ward, portrait by John Greenhill
- Born: 1617; Hertfordshire, England
- Died: 6 January 1689 (aged 71–72); London, England
- Education: Sidney Sussex College, Cambridge

Seth Ward (1617 – 6 January 1689) was an English mathematician, astronomer, and bishop.

== Early life ==
He was born in Hertfordshire, and educated at Sidney Sussex College, Cambridge, where he graduated B.A. in 1636 and M.A. in 1640, becoming a Fellow in that year. In 1643 he was chosen university mathematical lecturer, but he was deprived of his fellowship next year for opposing the Solemn League and Covenant (with Isaac Barrow, John Barwick and Peter Gunning).

== Academic ==
In the 1640s, he took instruction in mathematics from William Oughtred, and stayed with relations of Samuel Ward.

In 1649, he became Savilian professor of astronomy at Oxford University, and gained a high reputation by his theory of planetary motion, propounded in the works entitled In Ismaelis Bullialdi astronomiae philolaicae fundamenta inquisitio brevis (Oxford, 1653), against the cosmology of Ismael Boulliau, and Astronomia geometrica (London, 1656) on the system of Kepler. About this time he was engaged in a decades-long philosophical controversy with Thomas Hobbes: Seth Ward and John Wallis, both Savilian professors and members of the Anglican clergy, felt offended by the works of Hobbes, particularly after Leviathan was released.

A small part of the debate with John Webster launched by the Vindiciae academiarum he wrote with John Wilkins which also incorporated an attack on William Dell.

In 1659, Ward was appointed President of Trinity College, Oxford, but not having the statutory qualifications he resigned in 1660. Also in 1660, Ward became one of the founding fellows of the Royal Society of London. After Isaac Newton demonstrated his reflecting telescope before the Society, Ward nominated Newton as a new fellow, a position to which Newton was duly elected in 1672.

== Churchman ==
King Charles II appointed him to the livings of St Lawrence Jewry in London, and Uplowman in Devonshire, in 1661. He also became dean of Exeter Cathedral (1661) and rector of St Breock, Cornwall in 1662. In the latter year he was consecrated Bishop of Exeter, and in 1667 he was translated to the see of Salisbury. The office of Chancellor of the Order of the Garter was conferred on him in 1671.

In his diocese he showed great severity to nonconformists, and rigidly enforced the act prohibiting conventicles (unofficial religious meetings). He spent a great deal of money on the restoration of the cathedrals of Worcester and Salisbury. He died at Knightsbridge on 6 January 1689.

In 2017 Bishop Wordsworth's Grammar School named its new, fifth house (Ward House) after Bishop Ward.

Academic offices
| Preceded by John Greaves | Savilian Professor of Astronomy at Oxford; 1649–1660 | Succeeded by Christopher Wren |
| Preceded by William Hawes | President of Trinity College, Oxford; 1659–1660 | Succeeded by Hannibal Potter |
Church of England titles
| Preceded by William Peterson | Dean of Exeter; 1661–1662 | Succeeded by Edward Younge |
| Preceded by John Gauden | Bishop of Exeter; 1662–1667 | Succeeded by Anthony Sparrow |
| Preceded by Alexander Hyde | Bishop of Salisbury; 1667–1689 | Succeeded by Gilbert Burnet |
