= Bristol Choral Society =

English choir, founded in 1889

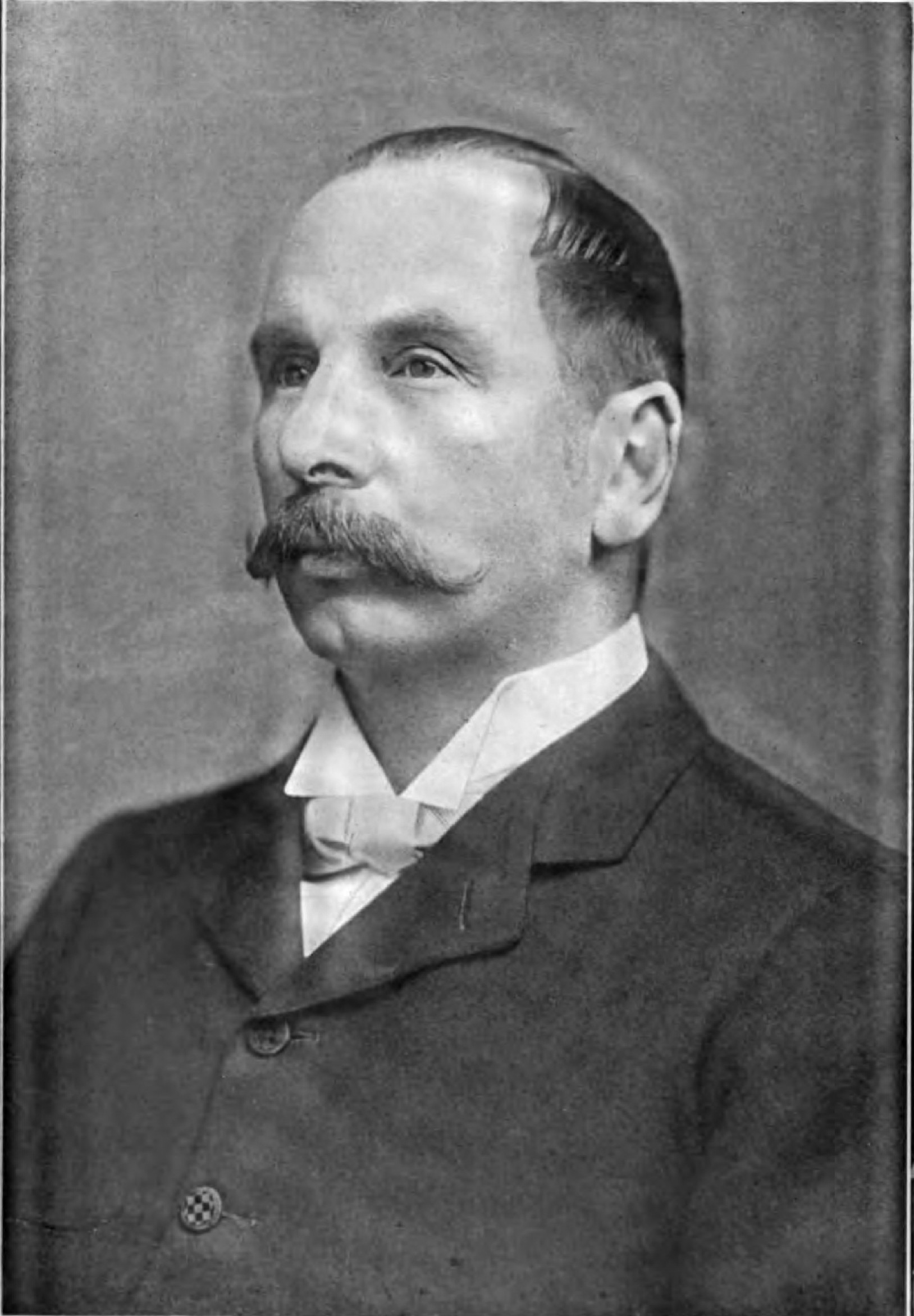
- George Risely, 1899, founder of Bristol Choral Society

Background information
- Also known as: BCS
- Origin: Bristol, England, United Kingdom
- Genres: Classical
- Years active: 1889–present
- Website: www.bristolchoral.co.uk

Bristol Choral Society is a large mixed-voiced choir based in Bristol, England, founded in 1889. As of 2002, it is conducted by Hilary Campbe, it has around 140 auditioned members. The choir stages at least three concerts annually at the Bristol Beacon (formerly Colston Hall) in Bristol with professional orchestras and soloists, and another annually at Bristol Cathedral in addition to other performances and broadcasts in Bristol and further afield.

== Beginnings ==
Bristol Choral Society was founded in 1889 by George Riseley, then organist of Bristol Cathedral. Its first performance was at the Colston Hall on 7 May 1890 – Mendelssohn's St. Paul with a choir exceeding 500 singers – and it has been performing principally at the Colston Hall ever since.

A few weeks later, the Society accepted its first invitation to sing outside Bristol, being asked by Augustus Manns to sing the same work at the Crystal Palace, London joining other choirs to number some 5,500 singers in total. The second Bristol concert was the first Bristol performance of Brahms' A German Requiem in December 1890.

== Messiah at the Colston Hall ==
On 21 December 1892, Bristol Choral Society gave its first performance of Handel's Messiah at the Colston Hall. It proved so popular, regularly attracting sell-out audiences, that it has been performed regularly ever since just before Christmas. 2012 marked the 120th anniversary of the choir's Messiah at Colston Hall with Messiah once again performed on the Saturday before Christmas – 120 years and 1 day after the first at that venue. Since 2006, the choir has performed all of Messiah from memory.

In 2010, an afternoon 'Mini Messiah' family concert preceding the evening full performance was added in order to introduce children to Messiah with an abridged version. This attracted a large audience and has been repeated periodically ever since.

== 1890s–1940s ==
From its foundation until the 1940s, the Society continued to stage several concerts annually (as many as 6, including concert performances of operas in addition to the more usual oratorio repertoire of such a choir) at the Colston Hall, even during times of war. The BBC Music Department, Orchestras and Chorus moved to Bristol during the 1939/40 season, enabling the Society's concerts to be staged as planned, but now in conjunction with the BBC and Bristol Philharmonic Society. Bristol Choral Society's annual report of 1940 reports that those concerts were broadcast on BBC Radio, and messages of appreciation received from as far away as Italy. The concert programme for the 6 April 1941 Colston Hall performance of Bach's St Matthew Passion under Sir Adrian Boult was headed with the following note:

In the event of an air-raid warning being received a notice will be displayed from the organ loft. The concert will continue, but patrons wishing to leave may do so.

The Colston Hall survived the bombs that brought much destruction all around it, but succumbed to a stray cigarette end in 1945. Until the opening of the newly re-built Colston Hall in 1951, the choir principally performed at Central Hall, Old Market (closed in 1985 and now apartments), including the 1945 Messiah performance with soloists Isobel Baillie and Kathleen Ferrier.

== 1950s–present day ==
With the opening of the newly re-built Colston Hall in 1951, the modern-day pattern of three annual concerts at the Hall (typically November, Messiah at Christmas and March) became established, with a regular fourth summer concert at one of the city's Cathedrals being added in the 1990s, since 2001 at Bristol Cathedral.

Since 1990, membership of the choir has been by audition, and periodic re-audition every two or three years. The choir remains one of the biggest in the region with a membership of around 180 auditioned singers and maintains its reputation as one of the premier symphony choruses in the South West of England. It stages concerts of a very high standard, regularly working with top professional orchestras such as the Bournemouth Symphony Orchestra, Royal Philharmonic Orchestra, City of Birmingham Symphony Orchestra, distinguished baroque ensembles and internationally renowned soloists such as Emma Johnson and tenor Mark Padmore in the 2011 season.

In addition to the established concert season, the choir also undertakes other engagements further afield, foreign tours and community, outreach and education work in and around Bristol.

In recent years, the choir has been invited to collaborate with other choirs such as the Philharmonia Chorus, London Symphony Chorus and the BBC National Chorus of Wales on many occasions to tackle some of the choral pieces requiring even greater choral forces such as Mahler's Eighth Symphony, Janáček's Glagolitic Mass, Dvořák's Stabat Mater and La Damnation de Faust by Berlioz. Many of these performances were conducted by the choir's presidents Richard Hickox and Sir Charles Mackerras and included concerts at The Proms and broadcasts on BBC Radio 3. The recording of the live broadcast of Janáček's Glagolitic Mass with Richard Hickox was issued as the cover CD of the February 2009 issue of BBC Music Magazine as part of the magazine's tribute to Richard Hickox. In late 2011, it was announced that tenor Mark Padmore was to become a joint president of Bristol Choral Society, alongside the Lord Mayor of Bristol (a position held by the Lord Mayor since 1900).

The choir is also often engaged to provide the chorus for concerts organised by other organisations, such as Elgar's The Kingdom for the Elgar Festival with the English Symphony Orchestra conducted by Vernon Handley at Worcester Cathedral in 2006, Tolga Kashif's Queen Symphony at the Colston Hall and The Anvil, Basingstoke with the Royal Philharmonic Orchestra conducted by the composer, Orff's Carmina Burana for the National Children's Orchestra of Great Britain at the Colston Hall in April 2011 and Vaughan Williams' Sinfonia antartica for the BBC National Orchestra of Wales at the Colston Hall on 20 November 2011 which was subsequently broadcast on BBC Radio 3. In April 2014, the choir sang in 2 performances of Janáček's Glagolitic Mass at Colston Hall and Royal Festival Hall, Southbank Centre, London, by invitation of the Philharmonia Orchestra, conducted by Jakub Hrůša. In November 2014 the choir joined with the BBC National Chorus of Wales for a performance of Elgar's The Dream of Gerontius. In spring 2016 it performed Vaughan Williams' Sea Symphony with the Philharmonia Orchestra under the direction of John Wilson. Choir members have several times in recent years been invited to join with the BBC National Chorus of Wales in promenade concerts, including Mahler's Eighth Symphony in 2018.

Hilary Campbell became the choir's first female conductor in April 2016. In addition to the established concert season, the choir also undertakes other engagements further afield, foreign tours (Germany in 2017 and 2019, Portugal in 2018, Spain in 2023), and community, outreach and education work in and around Bristol. Because of the continued closure of the Bristol Beacon for the rebuilding of its interior (originally scheduled for 2017–19), the choir has given most of its concerts in Bristol Cathedral since January 2018, apart from Messiah performances in Clifton Cathedral and Redmaids' High School. In January 2020 Bristol Choral Society made a recording of music by Bob Chilcott, Cecilia McDowall and Judith Weir for Delphian Records. No further performances were possible in the rest of the 2019–2020 season and the whole of the 2020–2021 season because of the COVID-19 pandemic, though the choir continued to have virtual rehearsals each week, recorded a virtual choir performance of Rachmaninov's "Bogoroditse Devo" (from All-Night Vigil) and was able to put on a very successful online carol composition competition in December 2020. These activities made the choir the winner of two Making Music awards in 2021 for best project with a focus on new music and best vocal group music director for Campbell. The choir and Campbell went on to enjoy further success becoming winners of the Royal Philharmonic Society Inspiration Award for 2021.

The choir returned to live performance in November 2021 with a concert at Bristol Cathedral which included a performance of Te Deum by Elizabeth Poston. Written over 60 years ago this was only the second time the piece had been performed.

== Principal officials since 1889 ==
Presidents of Bristol Choral Society since 1889

- Revd T E Brown 1889–1892
- The Dean of Bristol 1892–1900
- The Rt Hon The Lord Mayor of Bristol since 1900
- Richard Hickox 2000–2008
- Sir Charles Mackerras 2008–2010
- Mark Padmore since 2011

Vice presidents (at 2023)

- Adrian Partington
- Louise Mitchell

Permanent conductors of Bristol Choral Society since 1889

- George Riseley 1889–1926
- Sir Herbert Brewer 1926–1928
- Sir Thomas Beecham 1928–1929
- Samuel Underwood 1929–1958
- Dr W. K. Stanton 1958–1960
- Clifford Harker 1960–1989
- Murray Stewart 1989–2000
- Adrian Partington 2000–2016
- Hilary Campbell since 2016

The choir has also been conducted by many guest conductors, most notably Sir Edward Elgar conducting his own works on 28 January 1928, Sir Adrian Boult, Sir Henry Wood, and Vernon Handley.

Bristol Choral Society is a registered charity in England and Wales. Its charitable object is "to educate its members and the public in the arts and sciences, and in particular the art and science of choral music, and to contribute to the cultural life of the community, by the presentation of choral concerts and other activities."
