= John Brewer (MP) =

English politician (1654–1724)

John Brewer (1654 – 2 June 1724) was an English Tory politician and lawyer. He sat as MP for New Romney from 1689 to 1710.

He was baptised on 9 January 1654. He is the second but first surviving son of Thomas Brewer (died 1691) and his first wife Jane, the daughter of Thomas Houghton. He was educated at Wadham College, Oxford and matriculated in 1669, he entered Gray's Inn in 1671 and was called to the bar in 1678 and became an ancient in 1702. He married Jane (died 1717), the daughter of George Baker.
