= Cameron Walker =

Cameron Walker may refer to:

- Cameron Walker (soccer), Canadian soccer player
- Cameron Walker (Canadian football) (born 1992), Canadian football defensive lineman
- Cameron Walker-Wright (born 1989), American singer-songwriter
