= Geoffrey Webber =

Geoffrey Webber is a musician and academic, and the former Director of Music at Gonville and Caius College, Cambridge.

Webber was a chorister at Salisbury Cathedral, and was educated at the King's School Worcester and New College, Oxford, where he was awarded an organ scholarship in 1977. He wrote his doctoral thesis on the organ music of Dietrich Buxtehude.

He was appointed Assisting Organist of Magdalen College, Oxford, in 1982, and University Organist and Director of Music at the University Church in 1984. In 1989 he was appointed Precentor and Director of Music at Gonville and Caius College, Cambridge, serving until his resignation due to inappropriate behaviour in April 2019. He was succeeded by Matthew Martin.

Webber's publications include North German Church Music in the Age of Buxtehude (1996), the Cambridge Companion to the Organ (1998, as co-editor), and The Restoration Anthem (2003).

== Works ==
His works include:

- 1995 Puccini, Janáček, Geoffrey Webber - Requiem - Mass In E Flat (CD, Album) ASV Digital, CD DCA 914
- 1999 Bach - The Cambridge Baroque Camerata*, Geoffrey Webber - St Mark Passion (2xCD) ASV, Gaudeamus CD GAX 237
- 1999 Samuel Wesley, Geoffrey Webber – Sacred Choral Music (CD, Album) ASV, CD GAU 157
- 2011 Geoffrey Webber - In Dulci Jubilo (CD, Album) BBC Music Magazine BBC MM339, Vol. 20 No.3
- 2013 Geoffrey Webber, with Choir of King's College London - David Trendell - Deutsche Motette (German Romantic Choral Music From Schubert To Strauss) (CD) Delphian DCD34124
- 2014 Geoffrey Webber & Barnaby Brown - In Praise Of Saint Columba: The Sound World Of The Celtic Church (CD, Album) Delphian DCD34137
- 2017 Geoffrey Webber, Barnaby Brown, Bill Taylor (20), John & Patrick Kenny - Set Upon The Rood: New Music For Choir & Ancient Instruments (CD, Album) Delphian DCD34154
- 2018 Julian Anderson, Geoffrey Webber – Choral Music (CD, Album) Delphian DCD34202
