= Adrian Partington =

English conductor, chorus master, organist and pianist

Adrian Frederick Partington FRCO (born 1 October 1958) is an English conductor, chorus master, organist and pianist. He is director of music at Gloucester Cathedral, joint conductor of the Three Choirs Festival and artistic director for the Gloucester festival years, director of the BBC National Chorus of Wales, conductor of Gloucester Choral Society, and former conductor of Bristol Choral Society and leader of the postgraduate choral conducting course at the Royal Welsh College of Music & Drama.

The son of professional musicians, he was a chorister at Worcester Cathedral under Christopher Robinson and a pupil at The King's School, Worcester, studied at the Royal College of Music under Herbert Howells, and was organ scholar at St George's Chapel, Windsor Castle and King's College, Cambridge. He returned to Worcester as assistant organist from 1981 to 1991, before turning more of his attention to choral conducting.

He was associate chorus master of the CBSO Chorus and conductor of the City of Birmingham Symphony Youth Chorus during the Simon Rattle years until September 2000.

In 1999, he was appointed director of the BBC National Chorus of Wales – a position which he still holds, and has involved preparing the chorus for many concerts, BBC Radio 3 broadcasts, BBC Proms appearances and recordings under conductors such as Richard Hickox during his years as principal conductor of BBC National Orchestra of Wales. He also conducts several concerts himself each season, as well as other BBC engagements such as conducting the televised Swansea link at the Last Night of the Proms and recording the soundtrack for one series of Doctor Who.

Also in 1999, he was appointed conductor of the Royal Welsh College of Music & Drama chorus and he has been conductor of Bristol Choral Society since September 2000, whose principal concerts are with the Bournemouth Symphony Orchestra.

Partington has worked with London-based choirs such as the BBC Symphony Chorus, London Symphony Chorus, Philharmonia Chorus and The Bach Choir on several occasions. He has prepared choirs for conductors such as Claudio Abbado, Bernard Haitink and Sir Charles Mackerras.

He was appointed director of music at Gloucester Cathedral in 2007, and took up the post in January 2008, along with the positions of conductor of Gloucester Choral Society and joint conductor of the Three Choirs Festival. The 2010 Gloucester festival was the first under his artistic direction where he programmed the festival and conducted several concerts with the Philharmonia Orchestra including the world premiere of John Joubert's An English Requiem.

He also remains an active organist and pianist, appearing as organ soloist with the Berlin Philharmonic, BBC National Orchestra of Wales, CBSO and BBC Philharmonic amongst others and recording several solo organ CDs. He also frequently performs with leading instrumentalists as a pianist, such as Baroque violinist and co-leader of the Orchestra of the Age of Enlightenment Margaret Faultless with whom he gives recitals in the UK and Germany.

Cultural offices
Preceded by Andrew Nethsingha	Organist and Master of the Choristers of Gloucester Cathedral; 2007–	Succeeded by
