= Robert Harris (minister) =

English clergyman (1581–1658)

Robert Harris (1581–1658) was an English clergyman, known as a Puritan preacher, member of the Westminster Assembly, and President of Trinity College, Oxford.

== Life ==
He was born into a large family to John Harris, yeoman (whose family had originally come from Shropshire), and Elizabeth Hyron at Broad Campden, Gloucestershire. He was educated at Chipping Campden School and the King's School, Worcester. He matriculated, aged 15, at Magdalen Hall, Oxford, 10 June 1597, when his relative Robert Lyster aka Lyson was principal. In order to obtain tuition in philosophy, he taught Greek and Hebrew. He graduated B.A. on 5 June 1600, and though originally intended for the law, decided to enter the church.

When in 1604 the university was dissolved on account of the plague, Harris went home and preached his first sermon at Chipping Campden. In 1606 he married Joan Whateley, the sister of his friend and vicar of Banbury, William Whateley and subsequently raised a large family of at least a dozen children, including Dr. Malachi Harris M.A. D.D. who was, amongst other things, chaplain to Mary Princess of Orange and Charles II.

Returning to Oxford Robert studied theology for ten years, and graduated B.D. on 5 May 1614. In 1614 Sir Anthony Cope offered him the living of Hanwell, Oxfordshire, and Hanwell parsonage became a resort for Oxford students.

Harris won fame as a preacher at St. Paul's Cathedral, St. Saviour's Southwark, and other London churches, as well as in his own neighbourhood. He was a staunch Puritan and Parliamentarian. On 25 April 1642 he was chosen one of the holy divines to be consulted by Parliament, and on the occasion of a public fast (25 May) preached before the House of Commons.

After the battle of Edgehill the royalist troopers quartered at Hanwell turned out Harris and his family, and he was finally ejected from his living and obliged to go to London (September 1642). He was there made one of the Westminster Assembly, and received the living of St. Botolph's, Bishopsgate. In 1646 the committee of Hampshire presented him to Petersfield, but before he could take possession he was ordered to Oxford (10 September) as one of the six divines commissioned to preach there. From May 1647 to 1652, and again from 1654 to 1658, he was visitor to the university, and on 4 June 1647 preached at the University Church of St Mary the Virgin his first visitation sermon, in which he defended himself from the charge of pluralism.

On 12 April 1648 the chancellor of the University of Oxford, Philip Herbert, 4th Earl of Pembroke, admitted Harris to the degree of D.D., and at the same time he was made President of Trinity College in the place of Hannibal Potter, whom he had assisted to eject. The living of Garsington, Oxfordshire, went with the headship. He lectured once a week at All Souls' College, and preached on Sundays at Garsington. He died on 1 December 1658, at the age of 77 and was buried at Trinity College chapel.

He was satirised by the royalists as a notorious pluralist, but there is no proof that he enjoyed all his livings at the same time. John Wilkins describes him as one of the most eminent divines for preaching and practical theology. He published a large number of separate sermons. The chief authority is a eulogistic life by a friend, William Durham, Harris's kinsman and minister of Tredington.

Durham described Harris thus:- "Dr Harris was a man of admirable prudence, profound judgement, eminent gifts and graces, furnished with all the singular qualifications which might render him a complete man, a wise governor, a profitable preacher and a good Christian"

== Bibliography ==
- 1622 The drunkards cup
- 1622 Samuels funeral: or, a sermon preached at the funeral of Sir Anthonie Cope, Knight, and Barronnet. - published by John Bartlet, London
- 1624 Gods goodnes and mercie
- 1624 Peters enlargement upon the prayers of the church
- 1626 Hezekiahs recovery. Or, A sermon, shevving what use Hezekiah did, and all should make of their deliverance from sicknesse.
- 1628 Davids comfort at Ziklag
- 1628 The blessednesse of a sound spirit: with the misery of a wounded spirit
- 1628 S. Pauls confidence
- 1630 Two Sermons
- 1630 Sixe sermons of conscience
- 1630 Absaloms funerall: preached at Banburie, by a neighbour minister. Or, The lamentation of a loving father for a rebellious childe - published by John Bartlet, London
- 1631 Six sermons preached on severall texts and occasions
- 1632 The way to true happinesse
- 1635 The works of Robert Harris..
- 1641 Abners funerall
- 1641 Concio ad clerum
- 1642 A sermon preached to the Honorable House of Commons assembled in Parliament, at a publike fast, May, 25. 1642. - published by Thomas Man, London
- 1645 True religion in the old way of piety and charity
- 1648 Two letters written by Mr. Harris in vindication of himselfe from the known slanders of an unknown author.
- 1653 A brief discourse of mans estate in the first and second Adam

Academic offices
Preceded by Hannibal Potter	President of Trinity College, Oxford; 1648–1658	Succeeded by William Hawes
