= Eunuchus =

Ancient Roman play by Terence

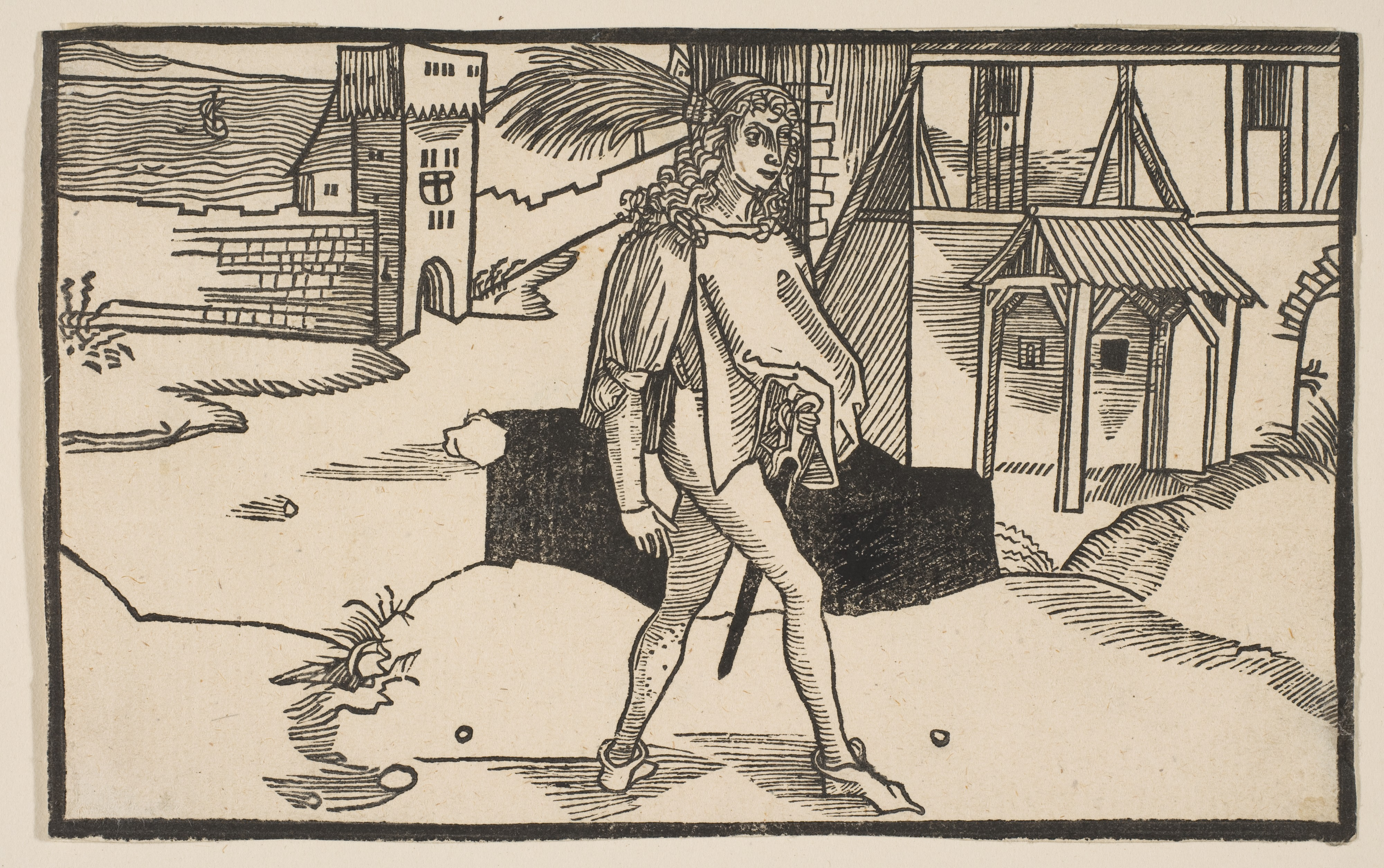
Drawing by Albrecht Dürer of a scene from Eunuchus, depicting Phaedria.

Eunuchus (The Eunuch) is a comedy written by the 2nd century BC Roman playwright Terence featuring a complex plot of rape and reconciliation. It was Terence's most successful play during his lifetime. Suetonius notes how the play was staged twice in a single day and won Terence 8,000 sesterces. The play is a loose translation of one written by Menander in Greek.

The play was first performed at the Megalesian Games in Rome in the spring of 161 BC. It was either the second or third of Terence's six plays.

== Characters ==
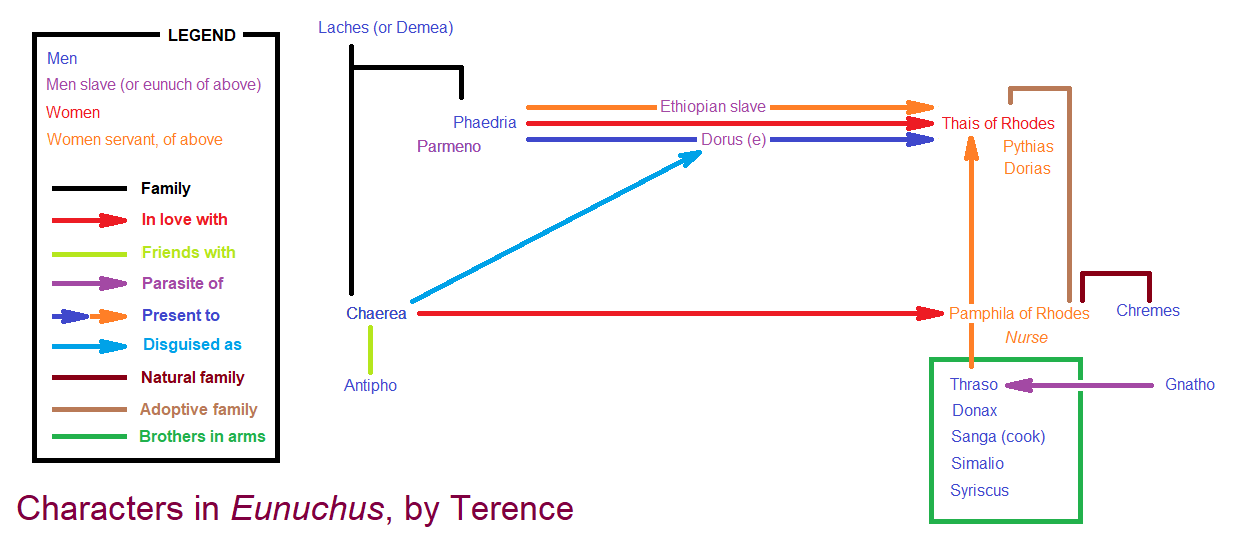
Map of characters

- Laches - Athenian nobleman and father of Phaedria and Chaerea. In some manuscripts his name is listed as Demea.
- Phaedria - A wealthy Athenian young man, in love with Thais.
- Chaerea - Younger brother of Phaedria, in love with Pamphila. Dresses as the eunuch Dorus to gain access to her.
- Antipho - Chaerea's friend who has been promised dinner.
- Chremes - A young Athenian man and brother to Pamphila.
- Thraso - A braggart soldier.
- Gnatho - Thraso's "parasite," a man who agrees with everything Thraso says in hopes of being invited to dinner.
- Dorus - A eunuch Phaedria bought as a gift for Thais.
- Parmeno - A slave belonging to Phaedria's family.
- Donax - Member of Thraso's "army."
- Sanga - Cook in Thraso's house and member of his "army" who shows up carrying a sponge.
- Simalio - Another member of Thraso's "army."
- Syriscus - Another member of Thraso's "army."
- Thais - A foreign courtesan from Rhodes living in Athens. She is attempting to reunite Pamphila with her true family.
- Pythias - Main maidservant of Thais.
- Dorias - Another maidservant of Thais.
- Pamphila - Younger sister of Chremes stolen as a child and raised as Thais' sister in Rhodes. She was purchased as a slave by Thraso and brought to Athens to be a gift to Thais.
- Sophrona - Pamphila's nurse.
- Ethiopian slave girl - A slave Phaedria purchased as a gift for Thais. She has no dialogue in the play.

== Prologue ==
The prologue is an apology for the work of Terence, who was coming under attack at the time for his writing. It is believed that he was a member of a writer's circle, and his work was not completely his own. He states that he

...doesn't deny that in his Eunuch he has transported characters out of the Greek: but ... if the same characters will not be permitted, how is it more permissible to depict a servant on the run, or to make use of good old women, evil courtesans, a gluttonous parasite, a braggart soldier, a changeling, an old man duped by a servant, or even love, hate, and suspicion? In short, nothing is said that has not been said before.

== Plot ==
The courtesan Thais has two lovers: a certain braggart army officer called Thraso, and the wealthy young man Phaedria, who lives next door. At the beginning of the play Thais begs Phaedria to leave town for a couple of days, just long enough for her to extract from Thraso the present of a younger girl. This girl, Pamphila, who was kidnapped from Athens by pirates and sold into slavery, had been brought up on the island of Rhodes as a younger sister to Thais. Thais now wishes to return the girl to her original family. Reluctantly Phaedria agrees to leave, but before departing he says he has his own presents for Thais, a black slave-girl and a eunuch. He leaves his slave Parmeno in charge of handing these presents over.

Soon afterwards, Pamphila is delivered to Thais's house, escorted by a "parasite" or hanger-on of Thraso, called Gnatho.

Now Phaedria's younger brother Chaerea comes along. He has seen Pamphila at the port, fallen immediately in love, and followed her to the house. Based on a joking suggestion by Parmeno, the beardless Chaerea decides to substitute himself for the eunuch in order to get into Thais's house and he forces Parmeno to cooperate. Since he has been away on military service, Thais and her household staff do not know his face. Chaerea's plan works, and at a suitable moment when Thais is out of the house with Thraso, he rapes Pamphila, and then, discovered by Thais's maid Pythias, he flees the scene.

Thais's plan to get in good favour with Pamphila's Athenian family seems to be ruined. At this point Phaedria returns and discovers what his brother has done. Chaerea returns to Thais's house and explains his love for Pamphila and agrees to marry her. Pamphila's brother, Chremes, is grateful for the return of his long-lost sister, Phaedria and Thais are reconciled, and the soldier and Phaedria agree to share Thais.

== Metrical structure ==
Distribution of metres
	iambic	trochaic
quaternarii		<0.2%
senarii	54%	
septenarii	9%	20%
octonarii	14%	2%

The metres used in the Eunuchus, in terms of the numbers of lines, are as follows:

- iambic senarii (ia6): 54% (this metre was unaccompanied)
- trochaic septenarii (tr7): 20%
- iambic octonarii (ia8): 14%
- iambic septenarii (ia7): 9%
- trochaic octonarii (tr8): 2%
- trochaic quaternarii (tr4): less than 0.2%

The different metres have different functions. Iambic senarii are used for exposition of the background, and often begin a metrical section. Trochaic septenarii are a metre of lively conversation; often in these passages the plot moves forwards.

Iambic octonarii (ia8) are often used when a character brings news. They can also sometimes be used for expressing distress or joy or other emotions. In this play, the metre is particularly associated with the younger brother Chaerea, who has 88 lines of the 110 iambic octonarii in this play.

The play also contains 104 lines of iambic septenarii (ia7). This metre (sometimes called "the metre of love" or "the laughing metre") is used when Pamphila and Chaerea first appear, and when Chaerea emerges from Thais's house and describes how he raped Pamphila. It is also used by Pythias when she is gleefully teasing Parmeno about how he is going to be punished.

One of the striking features of the Eunuchus is the fact that most of the lines of the courtesan Thais (unlike the lines of most courtesans in Roman comedy) are unaccompanied iambic senarii. When her words are accompanied by music at a moment of crisis, she uses an equally unprecedented series of eight trochaic octonarii (lines 739–736).

=== Prologue ===
- Prologue (lines 1–45): ia6 (45 lines)

Terence defends his play against the criticisms of another poet.

=== Phaedria is persuaded to leave town ===
- Act 1.1–1.2 (46–206): ia6 (151 lines)

The young man Phaedria is discovered consulting his slave Parmeno about what to do: he says that his girlfriend, the courtesan Thais, who had shut him out, has now invited him back. Parmeno advises him to be careful: if he shows any weakness, she will control him. Phaedria confesses that her behaviour angers him and yet he is burning with love.

– The courtesan, Thais, comes out of her house and greets Phaedria. With frequent interruptions from Parmeno, Thais explains that when she was a child she was brought up in Rhodes together with a kidnapped Athenian girl who was like a sister to her. Thais came to Athens in the company of her lover, who had gone off to Caria; it was at this time she started her relationship with Phaedria. By chance this lover of hers had bought the Athenian girl, intending to give her to Thais as a present; but he delayed giving her the girl when he saw that Thais now had another lover. Now Thais begs Phaedria to allow her two days with the other man, so that she can get the Athenian girl and restore her to her original family. – Phaedria is annoyed but eventually agrees to go to the country for two days. He also says he has bought her an Ethiopian slave-girl and a eunuch, as she requested. He orders Parmeno to see that these are delivered to her. – When Phaedria and Parmeno have gone inside, Thais declares that she loves Phaedria more than anyone.

- Act 2.1 (207–223): mixed iambic and trochaic metres (17 lines)

Phaedria comes out, on his way to the family's country residence. He reminds Parmeno to be sure to deliver his presents to Thais. – As soon as Phaedria has gone, Parmeno sees Gnatho, a parasite, approaching, bringing a girl even more beautiful than Thais. This is evidently the present from Phaedria's rival.

- Act 2.2 (224–254): tr7 (31 lines)

Talking to the audience, Gnatho recounts how he just now met another man of the same kind as himself, but unsuccessful. He boasts how he himself makes a good living by flattering the egos of wealthy men.

=== Chaerea appears ===
- Act 2.2 (255–291): ia7 (37 lines)

Gnatho goes on to say that when he and the man reached the market all sorts of traders came up fawning on him. The man, seeing this, begged Gnatho to allow him to be his disciple in the art of being a parasite. – He now sees Parmeno and greets him. Parmeno replies rudely. Gnatho takes the girl inside Thais's house and shortly afterwards comes out again and departs. – Suddenly Parmeno sees Phaedria's younger brother Chaerea approaching. He is surprised since Chaerea is supposed to be on public guard duty at the port.

- Act 2.3 (292–322): mostly ia8 (21 lines) mixed with other metres (9 lines)

Chaerea appears to have fallen madly in love (ia8). (Parmeno comments aside that he seems even worse smitten than Phaedria.) Chaerea sees Parmeno and, reminding him that he had often promised to help if ever Chaerea had a love affair, tells him he has fallen for a girl who, unlike most girls, is strong and buxom with a good complexion, 16 years old. He is determined to have her (ia6). But he doesn't know where she lives (ia7).

- Act 2.3 (323–351): ia6 (29 lines)

Chaerea tells Parmeno that he had lost sight of the girl when a relative of his father had stopped him in the street and delayed him. Parmeno reassures him that he knows where the girl is.

- Act 2.3 (352–366): tr7 (15 lines)

Parmeno informs Chaerea that the girl is a gift from the soldier Thraso to the courtesan Thais, who lives next door. He says that Phaedria for his part is offering an unsightly eunuch. Chaerea envies the eunuch since he is going to live in the same house as the beautiful girl.

- Act 2.3 (367–390): ia8 (23 lines), with tr7 (1 line)

Parmeno jokingly suggests that Chaerea (who is still only a youth) should dress up as the eunuch and go into the house instead of him (ia8). To his surprise Chaerea jumps at the idea (tr7). Parmeno is afraid of being punished but fails to deter Chaerea. Chaerea orders Parmeno to help him carry out the plan (ia8).

=== Chaerea rapes Pamphila ===
- Act 3.1–3.3 (391–538): ia6 (148 lines)

Secretly observed by Parmeno, the soldier Thraso and his parasite Gnatho arrive. Thraso is boasting of his friendship with a king, while Gnatho flatters him. He advises Thraso that if Thais seems to prefer Phaedria, he should respond by praising Pamphila, the Athenian girl.
– Thais comes out and greets Thraso. Parmeno steps forward and asks her to accept Phaedria's presents. He brings out a black girl and Chaerea, dressed up as a eunuch. Thraso and Gnatho declare that these presents are of small value. Parmeno tells Thais that Phaedria will be happy to share her time with other lovers. Thais takes the new slaves inside and comes out again with some attendants. Before she departs with Thraso, she gives instructions to one of her maids, Pythias, that if a certain Chremes arrives, she is to beg him to wait for her or come back later, or else Pythias should bring him to her. They depart.
– Chremes (Pamphila's brother) now arrives. In a soliloquy he relates how on his previous visit Thais had asked him all sorts of questions about his missing sister. Pythias greets him and begs him to wait or return tomorrow; when Chremes refuses, Pythias asks another maid, Dorias, to take him to Thais. They depart.

- Act 3.4 (539–548): ia7 (10 lines)

A friend of Chaerea called Antipho arrives. He says that Chaerea was responsible for organising a picnic for a group of colleagues that day but had disappeared with nothing done. Suddenly he is surprised to see Chaerea coming out of Thais's house dressed as a eunuch.

- Act 3.5 (549–561): mixed iambic and trochaic metres (13 lines)

Chaerea is singing deliriously with delight. Antipho accosts him and asks if he is mad.

- Act 3.5 (562–591): ia8 (30 lines)

Chaerea describes in detail how he gained admission to Thais's house, and how on the wall he had seen a picture of Jupiter seducing Danae by covertly entering her house.

- Act 3.5 (592–614): ia7 (23 lines)

He tells how he waited for a suitable opportunity after Pamphila had had a bath and then ravished her. – He assures Antipho the feast is already prepared. Antipho suggests Chaerea goes to change his clothes, but Chaerea is afraid to meet his father or brother, so Antipho says he can change at his house instead. The two young men go off together.

- Act 4.1 (615–628): mixed trochaic and iambic metres (tr8, tr7, ia8, ending tr7) (14 lines)

The slave girl, Dorias, who had escorted Chremes to the feast, returns and recounts how Thraso had got annoyed with Chremes, thinking him a rival lover of Thais. Before Dorias left, Thais had given her her gold jewellery to keep safe.

=== Phaedria discovers the truth ===
- Act 4.2 (629–642): ia6 (14 lines)

Phaedria returns from the country explaining that he had changed his mind about staying there.

- Act 4.3 (643–667): mixed iambic and trochaic metres, ending ia8 (25 lines)

Thais's maid Pythias comes out in a distressed state. She tells Phaedria that his eunuch has raped Pamphila. Phaedria is astonished and goes home to look for the eunuch.

- Act 4.4 (668–702): ia6 (35 lines)

Phaedria brings out Dorus, the eunuch, but Pythias says the rapist wasn't him, but a 16-year-old boy. When interrogated Dorus reveals that Chaerea had come with Parmeno, and had insisted on swapping clothes with him.

- Act 4.4 (703–726): tr7 (24 lines)

Phaedria interrogates Dorus again. Dorus at first repeats his story but when Phaedria gets angry, he denies it. Phaedria takes Dorus inside. Dorias advises Pythias to say nothing to Thais except that the eunuch has run away.

=== Chremes helps defend Thais's house ===
- Act 4.5 (727–738): ia8 (11 lines), ia6 (1 line)

Pamphila's brother Chremes arrives, slightly drunk; he seems to be not used to alcohol. He tells Pythias that at the banquet there was a violent quarrel.

- Act 4.6 (739–754): tr8 (8 lines) then mixed (8 lines)

Thais arrives and explains to Chremes urgently that the whole quarrel is about his sister, who is in the house. She tells Pythias to go and fetch the recognition tokens (ia7).

- Act 4.6 (755–770): tr7 (16 lines)

She says Chremes needs to stay to protect his sister from the soldier. Chremes, when he sees the soldier approaching, makes as if to run away, but is prevented by Thais. They all go into the house.

- Act 4.7 (771–787): ia8 (17 lines)

Thraso arrives with Gnatho and four other men, ready to storm Thais's house. Thais and Chremes appear at a window.

- Act 4.7 (788–816): tr7 (29 lines)

Thraso protests that Thais promised him several days in return for his present. He demands that she give the girl back. Chremes calls from the window that the girl is a freeborn Athenian and his own sister. Thraso and his men depart.

=== Chaerea begs Thais's forgiveness ===
- Act 5.1–5.4 (817–942): ia6 (126 lines)

Thais interrogates Pythias about why Pamphila is crying and her clothes are torn. Eventually Pythias reluctantly admits that Chaerea "made love" to her.
– Chaerea, still wearing the eunuch's costume, returns. He says he was embarrassed to change his clothes or attend the banquet, since Antipho's parents were both at home. Thais interrogates him, and he tries to excuse himself, saying he thought Pamphila was only a slave. Thais tells him he has ruined her plans. He begs Thais to forgive him, says he acted out of love, and offers to marry Pamphila. Thais seems inclined to forgive Chaerea. Despite Pythias's objections, she takes him inside the house to wait for Chremes, who is bringing his old nurse Sophrona to help the recognition.
– Pythias waits outside for Chremes, who soon arrives with Sophrona. He tells Pythias that Sophrona recognised the tokens. They all go inside.
– Parmeno arrives, congratulating himself that he has helped Chaerea learn about the bad and sluttish ways of courtesans. Pythias now comes out, and overhears him.

- Act 5.4 (943–970): tr7 (28 lines)

To tease and frighten Parmeno, Pythias cries out in pity for the "poor young man" and tells Parmeno that the girl who was raped was the sister of a high-ranking citizen, who had tied up Chaerea and at that very moment was preparing to punish him for his crime.

=== Phaedria's father learns the truth ===
- Act 5.5 (971–942): ia6 (31 lines)

Phaedria's father Laches appears from the country. Parmeno, trembling, tells him everything that has happened, trying to minimise his own role in the affair. Laches is furious. He goes into Thais's house.

- Act 5.6 (943–1024): ia7 (23 lines)

Pythias comes out laughing. She tells Parmeno that he's really going to be in trouble now that he has told Laches everything and Laches has seen his son dressed as a eunuch! Parmeno vows to pay her back one day, but realises that he has only himself to blame.

- Act 5.7–5.8 (1025–1031): tr7 (7 lines)

Thraso returns with Gnatho, ready to beg Thais for forgiveness. Chaerea comes out in delight.

=== Thraso comes to an arrangement with Phaedria ===
- Act 5.8 (1032–1049): ia8 (18 lines)

Chaerea congratulates Parmeno and begs him to inform Phaedria that Thais is now under his father's protection. Thraso is dismayed to hear this.

- Act 5.9 (1050–1094): tr7 (45 lines)

Thraso asks Gnatho if he can arrange for Thais to be shared. When Phaedria tells Thraso he is no longer welcome, Gnatho points out that Phaedria doesn't have enough money to keep Thais in style, but the soldier does; and there is no danger that she will fall in love with him in preference to the handsome Phaedria. Eventually Phaedria assents to the arrangement and the boys even allow Gnatho to be admitted into their fraternity.

== Later allusion ==
Augustine of Hippo in The City of God (II.7) cites Chaerea's speech from Act III, Scene 5, on the descent of Jupiter onto the lap of Danaë in the form of a golden shower as an authoritative precedent to justify his own licentious behaviour as likely to corrupt schoolboys.

Dante alludes to Terence's Thais in Canto 18 of the Inferno, where he encounters the flatterers, who are covered with human waste. Virgil points to one of the suffering souls:

At that juncture, my leader said to me,
“Now send your gaze a little further forward
So that your eye may rest upon the face
Of that slovenly and disheveled slattern
Scratching herself there with her shitty nails,
Who can’t decide between standing and squatting.
That is Thaïs, the whore who once replied
To a lover asking, ‘Have I found much favor
With you?’—‘Indeed, I’d say the very most!’
And let this be enough for our perusal.”

(From an unpublished translation of the Inferno by Peter D'Epiro)

== Translations and adaptations ==
- Jean de La Fontaine (1654)
- Edmund Ball, The Beautiful Armenia (1778)
