= List of people associated with Trinity College, Oxford =

This is a list of notable people affiliated with Trinity College at Oxford University, England. It includes former students, current and former academics and fellows, as listed in the Oxford Dictionary of National Biography or another available source. The overwhelming maleness of this list is explained by the fact that for over 90% of its history (from its foundation in 1555 until 1979), Trinity was an all-male institution.

== Former students ==
=== Academics and explorers ===
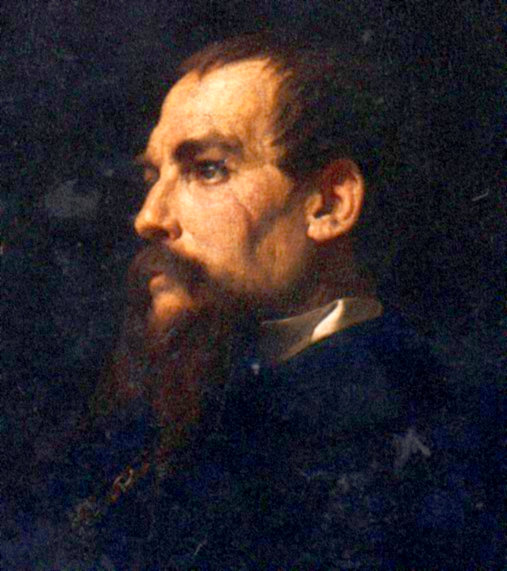
Sir Richard Burton

- Nigel Anderson
- John Aubrey
- Herbert Edward Douglas Blakiston
- Sir Richard Burton (sent down)
- Kenneth Clark
- John White
- Vincent Cronin
- Mamoru Imura
- Miles Kington
- Wlodzimierz Julian Korab-Karpowicz
- Sir Arthur Norrington
- William Gifford Palgrave
- Sir Arthur Quiller-Couch

=== Scientists, engineers and mathematicians ===
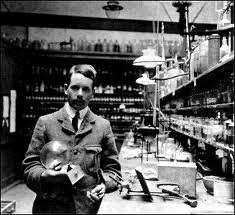
Henry Moseley

- Sir John Boreham
- Keith J. Laidler
- Henry Moseley
- Justin Stebbing
- Sir Harold Thompson

=== Artists and broadcasters ===
- Ralph Arnold
- Laurence Binyon
- George Butterworth
- Justin Cartwright
- Joyce Cary
- Lionel Chetwynd
- Sir John Denham
- E. R. Eddison
- Richard Foster
- David Green
- Basil Harwood
- Ben Judah
- Kit Lambert
- Walter Savage Landor
- William Lisle Bowles
- Thomas Lodge
- A. E. W. Mason
- Edward Powys Mathers
- James Michie
- John Middleton Murry
- Sir Terence Rattigan
- William Russell
- Christopher Tolkien
- Simon Tolkien
- David Walter
- David Yates
- Michael Geller-Gieleta

=== Business ===
- Sir Angus Ogilvy
- John Preston (1950-2017), music industry executive
- Sir William Stuttaford
- Sir Peter Stothard
- Huw van Steenis
- Tunku Varadarajan

=== Clergy and theology ===
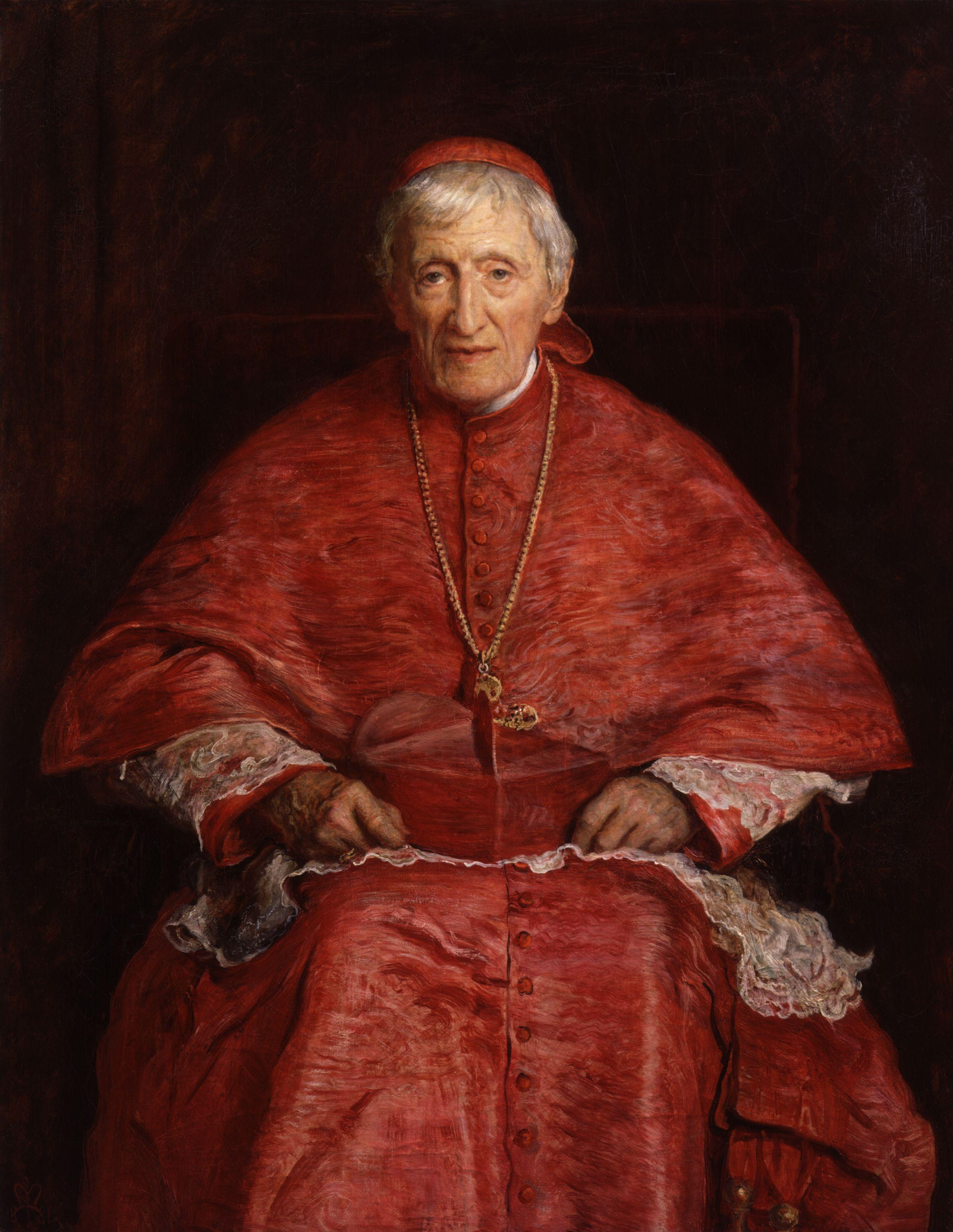
Cardinal Newman

- Aubrey Aitken
- Sidney Alexander
- John Arnold
- George Blackwell
- Henry Joy Fynes-Clinton
- John Gilbert
- Rupert Hoare
- Kenneth Kirk (Chaplain 1922–33)
- Robert MacCarthy
- Christopher Oswald Miles
- James Newcome
- John Henry Newman
- George Rawlinson
- Archibald Robertson
- John Rogers
- Montague Summers

=== Diplomats, civil servants and colonial administrators ===
- Sir George Bowen
- Harold Caccia, Baron Caccia
- Sir Edward Gent
- Vere Henry Hobart, Lord Hobart
- Sir Donald MacGillivray
- Albrecht von Bernstorff
- Sir Thomas Drew
- Sir Patrick Walker
- Sir Patrick Moberly

=== Lawyers ===
- Sir Edward Atkinson
- Peter Birks
- Rayner Goddard, Baron Goddard (former Lord Chief Justice)
- Philip Seaforth James
- John Lewger, first secretary and attorney general of Maryland, United States
- John McNeill, Crown Advocate of the British Supreme Court for China and chairman of the Hong Kong Bar Association

=== Military ===
- Captain Noel Godfrey Chavasse
- Major General Lord Michael Fitzalan-Howard
- Flight Lieutenant Richard Hillary, RAFVR
- Henry Ireton
- Lieutenant General Frank Klotz, USAF
- Sarah Oakley, Royal Navy officer
- Squadron Leader Dinghy Young, RAFVR

=== Politicians ===
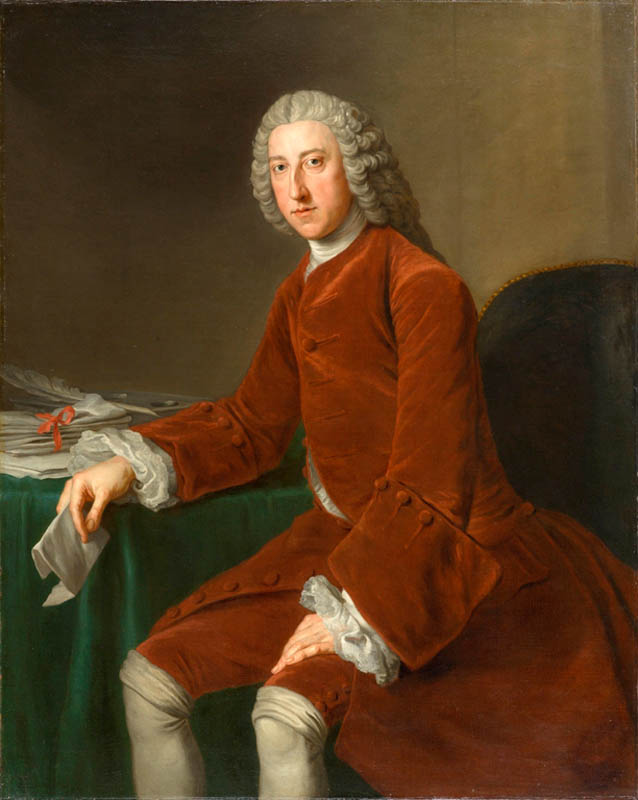
William Pitt the Elder

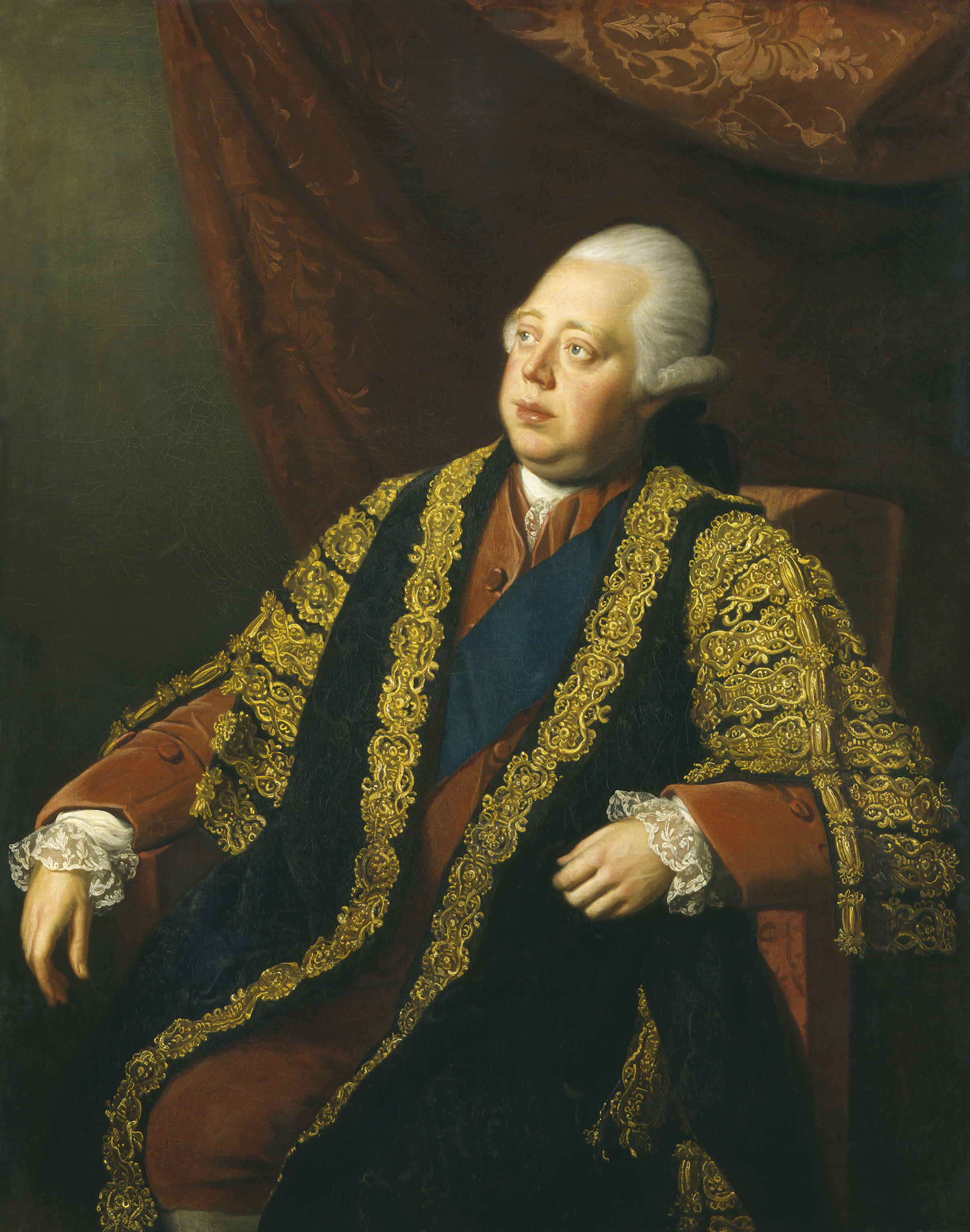
Frederick North, Lord North

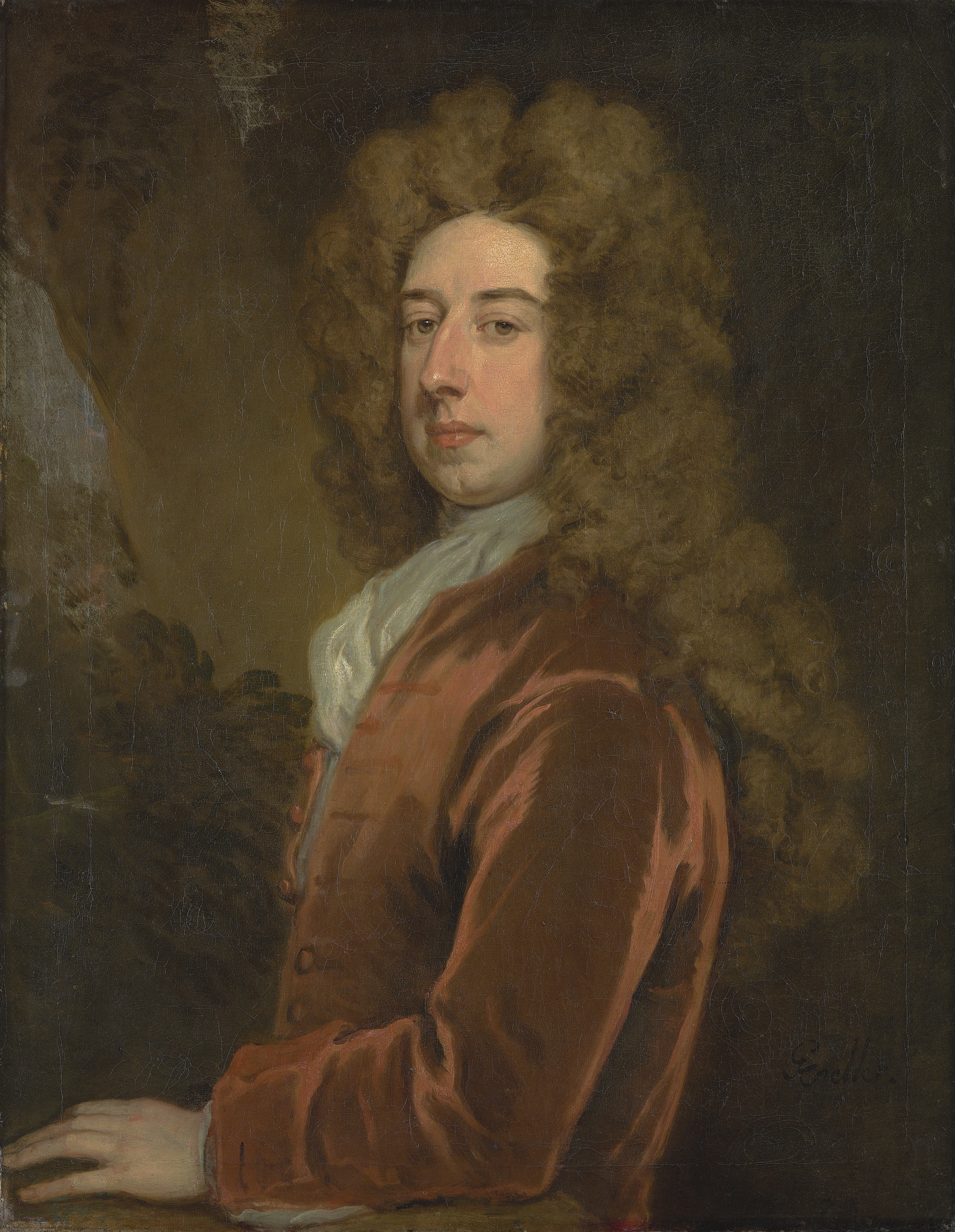
Spencer Compton, 1st Earl of Wilmington

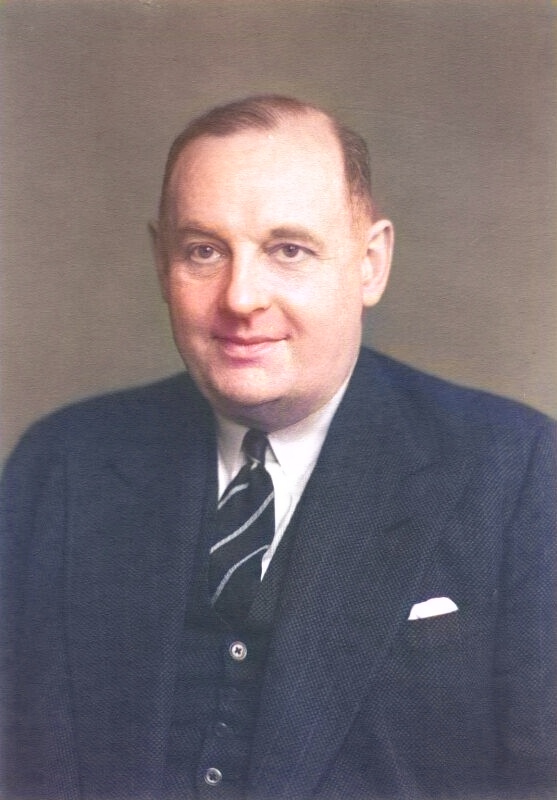
Sir Eric Errington

- Sir John Abdy
- Sir Robert Abdy
- Siân Berry
- James Bryce, 1st Viscount Bryce
- Cecilius Calvert, 2nd Baron Baltimore
- Richard Corbett
- Spencer Compton, 1st Earl of Wilmington
- Anthony Crosland
- Arthur Chichester, 1st Marquess of Donegall
- Henry Devereux, 14th Viscount Hereford
- Sir Eric Errington
- Edgar Graham
- David Hennessy, 3rd Baron Windlesham
- Sir Peter Hesketh-Fleetwood
- Lancelot Joynson-Hicks, 3rd Viscount Brentford
- Sir Peter Kirk
- Ben Lake
- Lord Kingsdown
- Norris McWhirter
- Frederick North, 2nd Earl of Guildford
- King Philippe of Belgium
- William Pitt, 1st Earl of Chatham
- Sir John Sinclair
- John Somers, 1st Baron Somers
- Sir Jacob Rees-Mogg
- James Schneider
- Henry Somerset, 6th Duke of Beaufort
- James Stanhope, 1st Earl Stanhope
- Martin Stevens
- Jeremy Thorpe
- Andrew Tyrie

=== Sports people ===
- Andrew Comrie-Picard, X Games medallist and Hollywood stuntman
- Simon Danielli, rugby union player for Ulster and Scotland
- Walter Henderson, Olympic athlete
- Frederic Hugh Lee (1855–1924), Trinity College matriculant (1874), England rugby international and Registrar of the Court of Arches
- Constantine Louloudis, rower, bronze medallist in the 2012 Summer Olympics and gold medallist in the 2016 Summer Olympics
- Bevil Rudd, Olympic athlete
- Bonnie St. John, medal-winning Paralympic skier
- Henry Melvin 'Dinghy' Young, RAF pilot and rower in the 1938 Boat Race

=== Miscellaneous ===
- Michele Acton, Principal, St Hugh's College, Oxford
- Sir Arthur fforde
- Phil Harvey, Coldplay
- Frank Luntz
- Kate Mavor, Principal of St Cross College, Oxford
- Ross McWhirter
- Tom Riordan

=== Journalists ===
- Patrick Cockburn
- Adrian Michaels
- Michael Peel

=== Fictional characters ===
Fictional former students include Jay Gatsby, the title character of F. Scott Fitzgerald's 1925 novel The Great Gatsby who attends Trinity briefly after World War I, and Tiger Tanaka, an ally of James Bond in Ian Fleming's 1964 novel You Only Live Twice who receives a first in PPE before World War II.

Recent books in which Trinity features prominently are:

- Cartwright, Justin (2008). This Secret Garden. London: Bloomsbury. ISBN 978-0-7475-7961-8.
- von Siemens, Carl (2010). Kleine Herren. Ein Deutscher in Oxford. Frankfurt am Main: Scherz. ISBN 978-3-502-15159-3.
- Flintoff, Ian (2015). Gatsby at Trinity. Oxford: YouCaxton-Pitchfork Production. ISBN 978-190964-469-4.

== Fellows ==
- John Michael Hammersley (1920–2004), mathematician
- Sir Cyril Hinshelwood (1897–1967), physical chemist; Nobel laureate
- Sir Henry Stuart Jones (1867–1939), classicist
- Martin Kemp (born 1942), art historian
- Ronald Knox (1888–1957), theologian
- Hans Adolf Krebs (1900–1981), biologist; Nobel laureate
- David Lambert Lack (1910–1973), evolutionary biologist
- Michael Maclagan (1914–2003), historian
- Rodney Robert Porter (1917–1985), biochemist; Nobel laureate
- Sir Edwin Southern (born 1938), molecular biologist
- Sir Ronald Syme (1903–1989), ancient historian
- Gail Trimble (born 1982), classicist
- Thomas Warton (1728–1790), historian and poet

== Presidents ==
The head of Trinity College, Oxford, is titled the president.

16th century

- Thomas Slythurst (1556–1559; first president)
- Arthur Yeldard (1559–1599)
- Ralph Kettell (1599–1643)

17th century

- Hannibal Potter (1643–1648; first term)
- Robert Harris (1648–1658)
- Seth Ward (1659–1660)
- Hannibal Potter (1660–1664; second term)
- Ralph Bathurst (1664–1704)

18th century

- Thomas Sykes (1704–1705)
- William Dobson (1706–1731)
- George Huddesford (1731–1776)
- Joseph Chapman (1776–1808)

19th century

- Thomas Lee (1808–1824)
- James Ingram (1824–1850)
- Samuel William Wayte (1866–1878)
- John Percival (1879–1887)
- Henry George Woods (1887–1897)
- Henry Francis Pelham (1897–1907)

20th century

- Herbert Edward Douglas Blakiston (1907–1938)
- J. R. H. Weaver (1938–1954)
- Arthur Norrington (1954–1970)
- Alexander George Ogston (1970–1978)
- Anthony Quinton (1978–1987)
- John Burgh (1987–1996)
- Michael Beloff (1996–2006)

21st century

- Sir Ivor Roberts (2006–2017)
- Dame Hilary Boulding (2017–2025)
- Sir Robert Chote (2025–present)
