= Ivor Roberts =

Ivor Roberts may refer to:

- Ivor Roberts (actor) (1925–1999), British actor and television presenter
- Ivor Roberts (diplomat) (born 1946), former British ambassador to Italy, now President of Trinity College, Oxford
