= Renn Hampden =

English bishop of Hereford and theologian

The Right Reverend Renn Hampden
- Bishop of Hereford
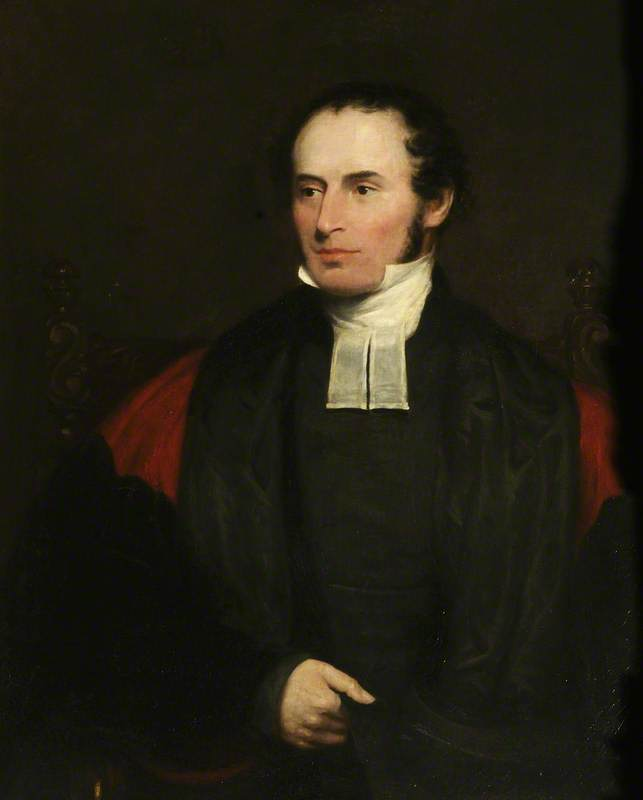
- Hampden by Henry William Pickersgill
- Church: Church of England
- Diocese: Diocese of Hereford
- In office: 1848–1868
- Predecessor: Thomas Musgrave
- Successor: James Atlay
- Other posts: Regius Professor of Divinity, Oxford University (1836–1848)

Orders
- Consecration: 26 March 1848

Personal details
- Born: Renn Dickson Hampden; 29 March 1793 Colony of Barbados
- Died: 23 April 1868 (aged 75) London
- Denomination: Anglicanism
- Education: Oriel College, Oxford

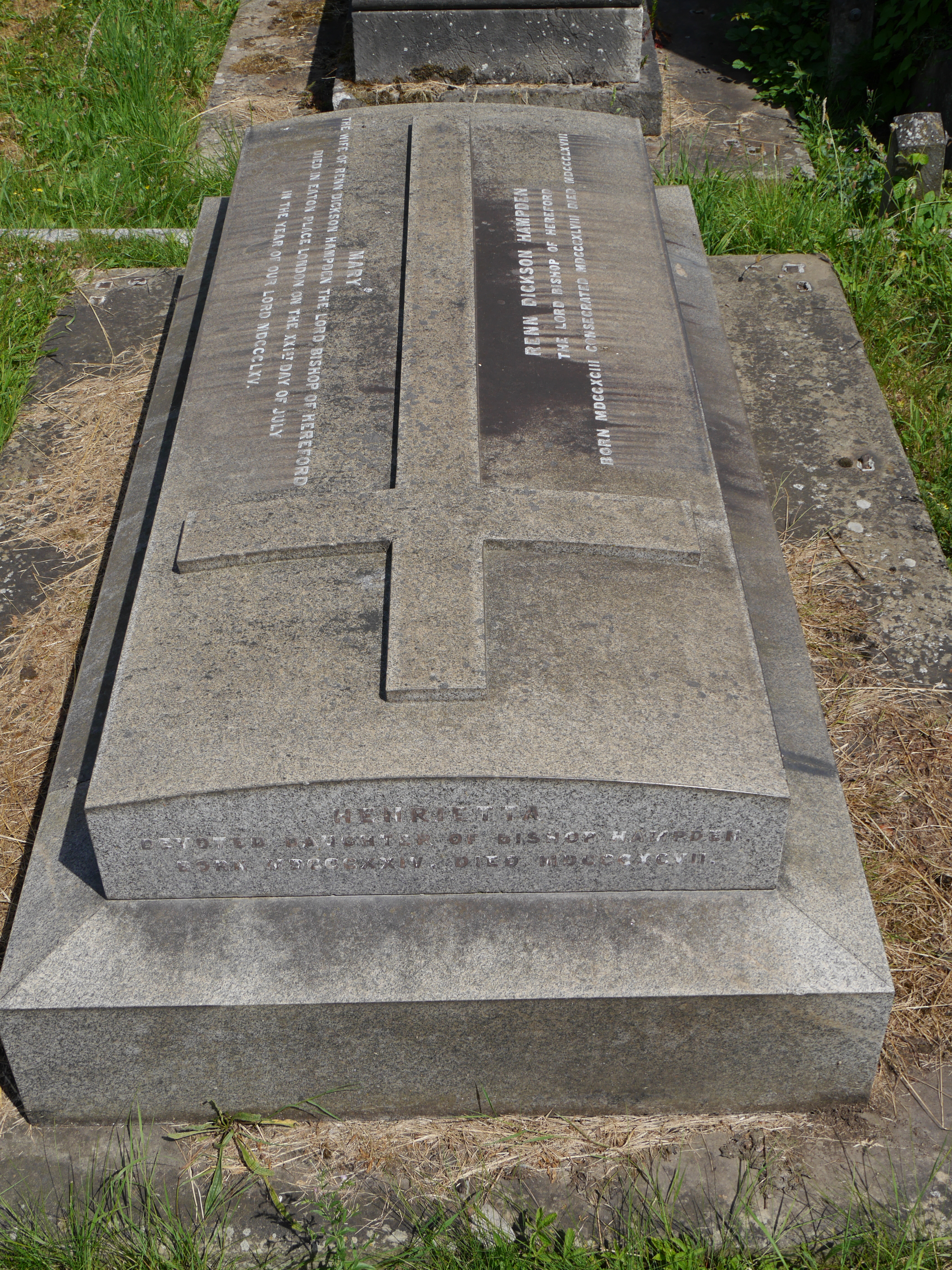
Grave, Kensal Green Cemetery

Renn Dickson Hampden (29 March 1793 – 23 April 1868) was a British Anglican clergyman of evangelical sympathy who contested the supporters of Tractarianism whilst he taught at the University of Oxford between 1829 and 1846.

His support for the admission of non-Anglicans to the Universities of Cambridge and Oxford was unpopular and motivated protests against his appointment as Regius Professor of Divinity. His subsequent election as Bishop of Hereford provoked challenges to the use of royal prerogative to appoint bishops.

== Early life, education, and parish ministries ==
He was born in Barbados, where his father was a colonel of the militia, on Good Friday 1793. He was related to Colonel Thomas Moody, ADC, CRE WI, Kt., whose seat at Berrywood House, Millbrook Road (now Freemantle), Hampshire, which is now demolished, he frequently visited.

He was educated at Oriel College, Oxford, at which he received the degree of B. A. in 1813, with first-class honours in both classics and mathematics, and the chancellor's prize for a Latin essay in 1814. He was subsequently elected as a fellow of Oriel College and became a moderate member of the Oriel Noetics, who were sociopolitical Whigs who were critical of religious orthodoxy.

In 1827, he published Essays on the Philosophical Evidence of Christianity, followed by a volume of Parochial Sermons illustrative of the Importance of the Revelation of God in Jesus Christ (1828).

== Teaching and conflict in Oxford (1829–1846) ==
In 1829, Hampden returned to Oxford and in May 1830 became one of the tutors at Oriel where a disagreement about the tutors' duties led to John Henry Newman, Hurrell Froude, and Robert Wilberforce being relieved of their duties. Hampden was chosen to deliver the prestigious Bampton Lectures for 1832, in which he attempted to disentangle the original truth of Christianity from later accretions and superstitions, particularly scholastic philosophy.

At the time, some thought he had committed himself to a heretical view of the Trinity akin to Socinianism and Sabellianism, but serious questioning only started after the publication of his Observations on Religious Dissent in 1834, and wide-ranging outrage was sparked in 1836 after his nomination to the Regius Professorship of Divinity.

In 1833, he moved from a tutorship at Oriel to become Principal of St Mary Hall, Oxford. In 1834, he was appointed White's Professor of Moral Philosophy without any adverse comment in preference to Newman.

=== Wider background of the conflicts ===
The years 1815–1914 were a time of radical social and political change in which religion played a significant role. Politically the Church of England was overwhelmingly Tory and opposed to political reform. At the start of this period, many Anglicans equated the religious well–being of the country to that of their own church while Protestant and Catholic dissidents suffered under discriminatory religious legislation. The Whig party and its reforming programme relied heavily on the support of Protestant dissidents who saw the parish priest as "the black recruiting–sergeant against us". Feelings ran very high, particularly between 1825 and 1850.

Despite the recent, partial relief afforded by the repeal of the Test and Corporation Acts and the Roman Catholic Relief Act 1829, non-Anglicans still suffered from serious discrimination. The tensions had been worsened by the actions of 21 bishops in voting against the reform of Parliament in 1831 while only 3 voted in favour. Had all voted in favour the Bill would have passed.

Oxford and Cambridge Universities played a central role in the Church of England. They were wholly Anglican institutions. At Oxford, students had to subscribe to the Thirty-Nine Articles of the Church of England as part of the admission process; while at Cambridge no one could graduate without doing so. They were the principal nurseries of Anglican clergy and extremely influential in the country in general.

The passing of the Reform Bill in 1832 did little to ease the tensions since the widened franchise produced a reforming parliament in which the more radical members obviously had ecclesiastical abuses in their sights as part of a very wide-ranging programme. Many dissenters campaigned for the disestablishment of the Church of England and the Government's decision to merge ten dioceses of the Church of Ireland with their neighbours was seen as a serious threat to the Church of England when carried into effect by the Church Temporalities (Ireland) Act 1833 (3 & 4 Will. 4. c. 37). It was the direct cause of John Keble's famous assize sermon on "National Apostasy" at Oxford the following year and this in its turn led to the Tractarian Movement. By 1834, the tensions between dissenters and churchmen had reached unprecedented levels, probably because the dissenters sensed the Church of England would cling to its remaining privileges.

=== Observations on Religious Dissent ===
In the summer of 1834, a bill to abolish subscription on admission to a university or on taking any degree rather than requiring a subscription to the 39 Articles of the Church of England was rejected by the House of Lords. Hampden entered the public arena in August by publishing Observations on Religious Dissent in support of the admission of non-Anglicans to Oxford University on the strength of a simple declaration of faith.

Even so, urged by the Duke of Wellington (recently elected Chancellor), on 10 November the heads of the Oxford Colleges recognised that public feeling was opposed to making schoolboys subscribe to the Articles on matriculation and by a single vote agreed to abolish the practice. Hampden then produced a second edition of the pamphlet and sent a copy to John Henry Newman who, while recognising its "tone of piety" regretted that the arguments of the work tended "altogether to make shipwreck of the Christian faith". Debate via published works and personal acrimony between the two scholars continued for two years.

The decision of the heads of Colleges was rescinded but revived in March of the following year when a motion to that effect was roundly defeated in Convocation by 459 votes to 57 where all Masters of Arts whether resident or not had the right to vote and all types of traditionalist MAs combined to defeat it.

A few months later, Lord Radnor introduced a parliamentary bill with the same object and Hampden was the only resident to speak out openly in favour. He became the chief target of a book on the subscription issue edited by Newman who accused Hampden of being a Socinian in it.

=== Regius Professor ===
In 1836 the Regius Professor of Divinity died suddenly and the Whig Prime Minister, Lord Melbourne, offered the post to Hampden. (The only other clergyman from Oxford who in Whig eyes deserved preferment was Thomas Arnold of Rugby School but he was already regarded as a heretic in conservative church circles). The news leaked out (Note: This was Melbourne's own fault in that the offer was sent to Hampden in an envelope which Melbourne himself had franked by signing his name on the envelope as a peer was entitled to do and so saving the postage. The signature was recognised in Oxford and someone drew the obvious conclusion.(Chadwick 1966, p. 114)) before the appointment was confirmed and opposition was quickly organised in the hope of preventing it. It came from three different groups.

A few high churchmen and evangelicals genuinely believed him to hold heretical views and therefore to be unfit to train future clergymen; a large number of Oxford graduates resented the favour shown to the author of Observations on Religious Dissent; and a large number of Tory supporters throughout the country seized the chance of harrying a Whig government. Despite all the objections, Melbourne pushed the nomination through and Hampden became the Regius Professor of Divinity. Melbourne told the House of Lords when the appointment was debated, with brutal frankness that few if any of them had the expert knowledge to have an informed opinion on the matter.

== Bishop of Hereford ==
Hampden's nomination by Lord John Russell to the vacant see of Hereford in December 1847 provoked opposition; and his consecration, in March 1848, occurred despite remonstrance by many of bishops, and John Merewether, the Dean of Hereford, voted against the election. As bishop of Hereford, Hampden maintained his characteristic studious asceticism, but his diocese prospered.

His important late writings include the articles on Aristotle, Plato and Socrates, in the eighth edition of the Encyclopædia Britannica, that were reprinted with additions under the title of The Fathers of Greek Philosophy (Edinburgh, 1862).

He had a paralytic seizure in 1866 and died in London on 23 April 1868. His daughter, Henrietta Hampden, published Some Memorials of R. D. Hampden in 1871.

Academic offices
Preceded by Edward Burton	Regius Professor of Divinity at Oxford; 1836–1848	Succeeded by William Jacobson
Church of England titles
Preceded by Thomas Musgrave	Bishop of Hereford; 1847–1868	Succeeded by James Atlay
