= James Atlay =

English Anglican bishop (1817–1894)

The Right Reverend James Atlay
- Bishop of Hereford
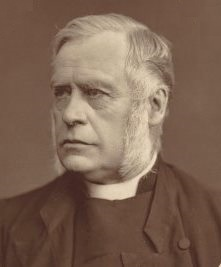
- Atlay, c. 1877
- Church: Church of England
- Diocese: Diocese of Hereford
- In office: 1868–1894
- Predecessor: Renn Hampden
- Successor: John Percival

Personal details
- Born: 3 July 1817
- Died: 24 December 1894 (aged 77)
- Buried: Hereford Cathedral
- Denomination: Anglican
- Spouse: Frances Turner (m.1859)
- Education: St John's College, Cambridge

James Atlay (3 July 1817 – 24 December 1894) was an English churchman, Bishop of Hereford from 1868 to 1894.

== Life ==
James Atlay was born in Wakerley, Northamptonshire, the son of Henry Atlay (Rector of Great Casterton) and Elizabeth Rayner Hovell. His younger brother Brownlow Atlay (1832–1912) was Archdeacon of Calcutta.

Educated at Oakham School, Atlay entered St John's College, Cambridge, where he held a fellowship from 1846 to 1859. He was vicar of Madingley, near Cambridge, from 1847 to 1852, and Queen's preacher at the Chapel Royal, Whitehall, 1857. He occupied the position of a senior tutor in his college at the time he was elected in 1859 to the vicarage of Leeds. Atlay was appointed a canon of Ripon Cathedral in 1861.

In 1867, he refused the bishopric of Calcutta, but in the following year accepted the bishopric of Hereford, in succession to Renn Hampden.

He possessed great organising ability and an attractive personality and was described by Edward White Benson, Archbishop of Canterbury, as "the most beautiful combination of enthusiasm, manliness and modesty."

== Family ==
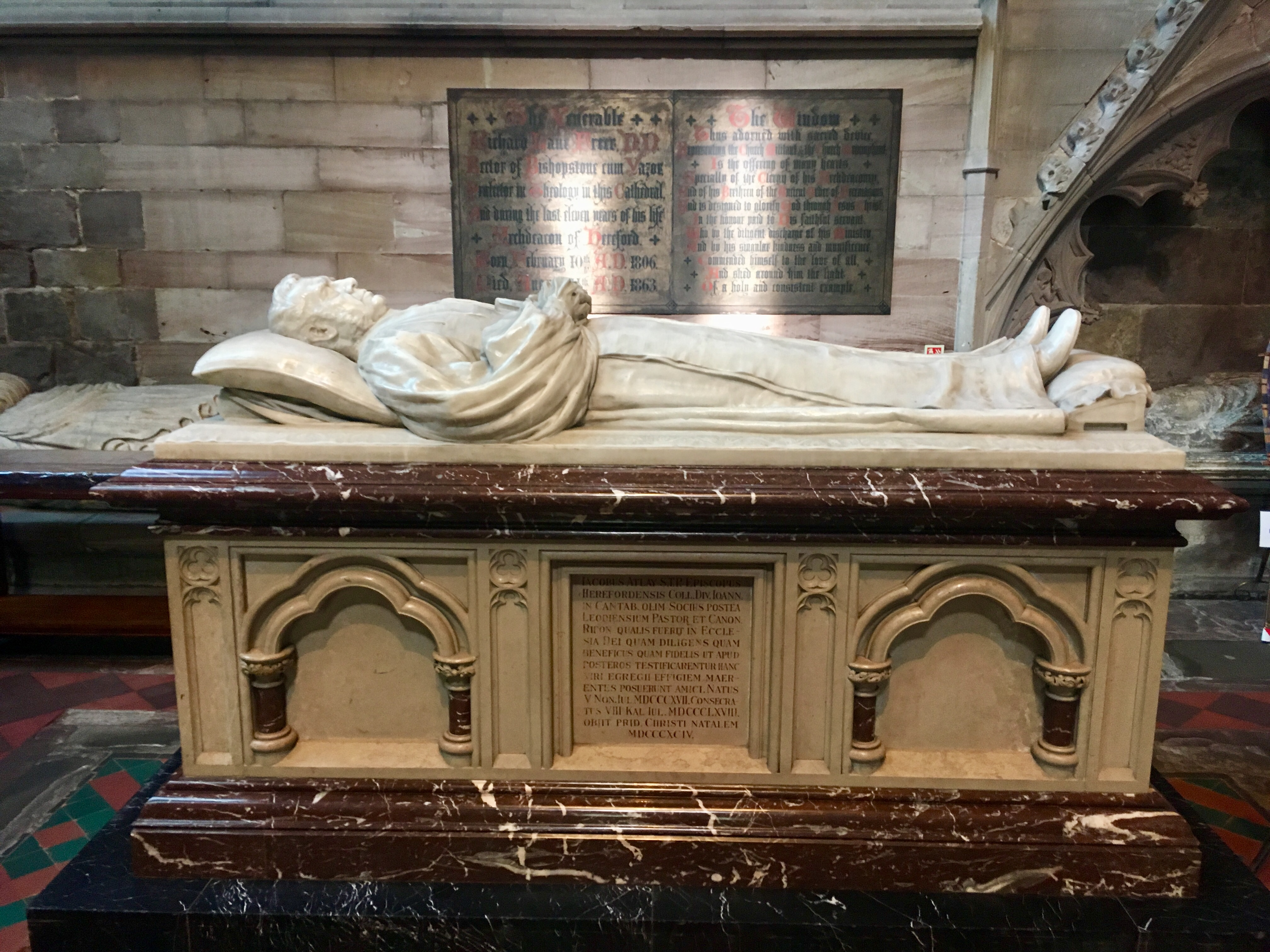
The memorial to Atlay in Hereford Cathedral

Atlay married in 1859 Frances Turner, younger daughter of William Martin, a major of the Bengal Army. Atlay died on 24 December 1894 aged 77 and is buried in Hereford Cathedral where he has a magnificent memorial in the north transept, the work of James Forsyth.

His eldest son James Beresford Atlay (1860–1912), known as J. B. Atlay, was author of The Trial of Lord Cochrane (1897), Famous Trials of the 19th Century (1899), and other works of legal history. Among his other children were George William Atlay, who was murdered by a party of Ngoni people while attached to the Universities' Mission to Central Africa at Likoma, Lake Nyasa; and Charles Cecil Atlay, who died of wounds sustained at Ladysmith in early 1900, during the Second Boer War.

On the completion of his episcopate, Atlay was presented with a picture of himself by Edward Arthur Fellowes Prynne from the Diocese of Hereford. In 1893, another portrait was painted by John Collier. Both were in the possession of Mrs Atlay, and replicas of the latter were hung in the Bishop's Palace at Hereford, and in the combination room at St John's College, Cambridge.

== Sources ==
This article incorporates text from a publication now in the public domain: Atlay, James Beresford (1901). "Atlay, James". In Lee, Sidney (ed.). Dictionary of National Biography (1st supplement). London: Smith, Elder & Co.

Church of England titles
Preceded by Renn Hampden	Bishop of Hereford; 1868–1894	Succeeded by John Percival
