= William Webb Ellis =

English cleric and alleged inventor of rugby

The Reverend William Webb Ellis
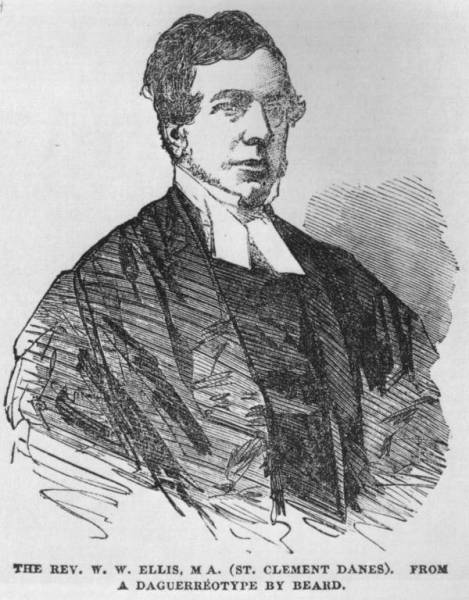
- The only known contemporary image of Webb Ellis, published in the Illustrated London News, 1854
- Born: 24 November 1806; Salford, Lancashire, England
- Died: 24 February 1872 (aged 65); Menton, Alpes-Maritimes, France
- Education: Rugby School; Brasenose College, Oxford
- Occupation: Clergyman
- Organization: Church of England

William Webb Ellis (24 November 1806 – 24 February 1872) was an English Anglican clergyman who has been credited as the inventor of rugby football while a pupil at Rugby School. According to accounts by Matthew Bloxam, Webb Ellis caught the ball and ran with it during a school football match in 1823, thus creating the "rugby" style of play. The first accounts of the origins of rugby football appeared in 1876 and were investigated by the Old Rugbeian Society in 1895, producing a report in 1897 supporting Matthew Bloxam's accounts. These accounts are now discounted by some rugby historians as an origin myth.

The Webb Ellis Cup is presented to the winners of the Rugby World Cup.

== Biography ==
Arms of Ellis of Kiddal Hall

William Webb Ellis was born in Salford, Lancashire, and was the youngest of three sons of James Ellis, a cornet in the 7th Dragoon Guards. The eldest son, James, died aged three, and the second son, named Thomas, was of Dunchurch, Warwickshire, and he became a surgeon. William's father James was married for a second time in Exeter in 1804 to Ann, daughter of William Webb, a surgeon, of Alton, Hampshire. His paternal grandfather was from Pontyclun in South Wales, a descendant of the Ellis family of Kiddal Hall, just off the A64 near Potterton, West Riding of Yorkshire.

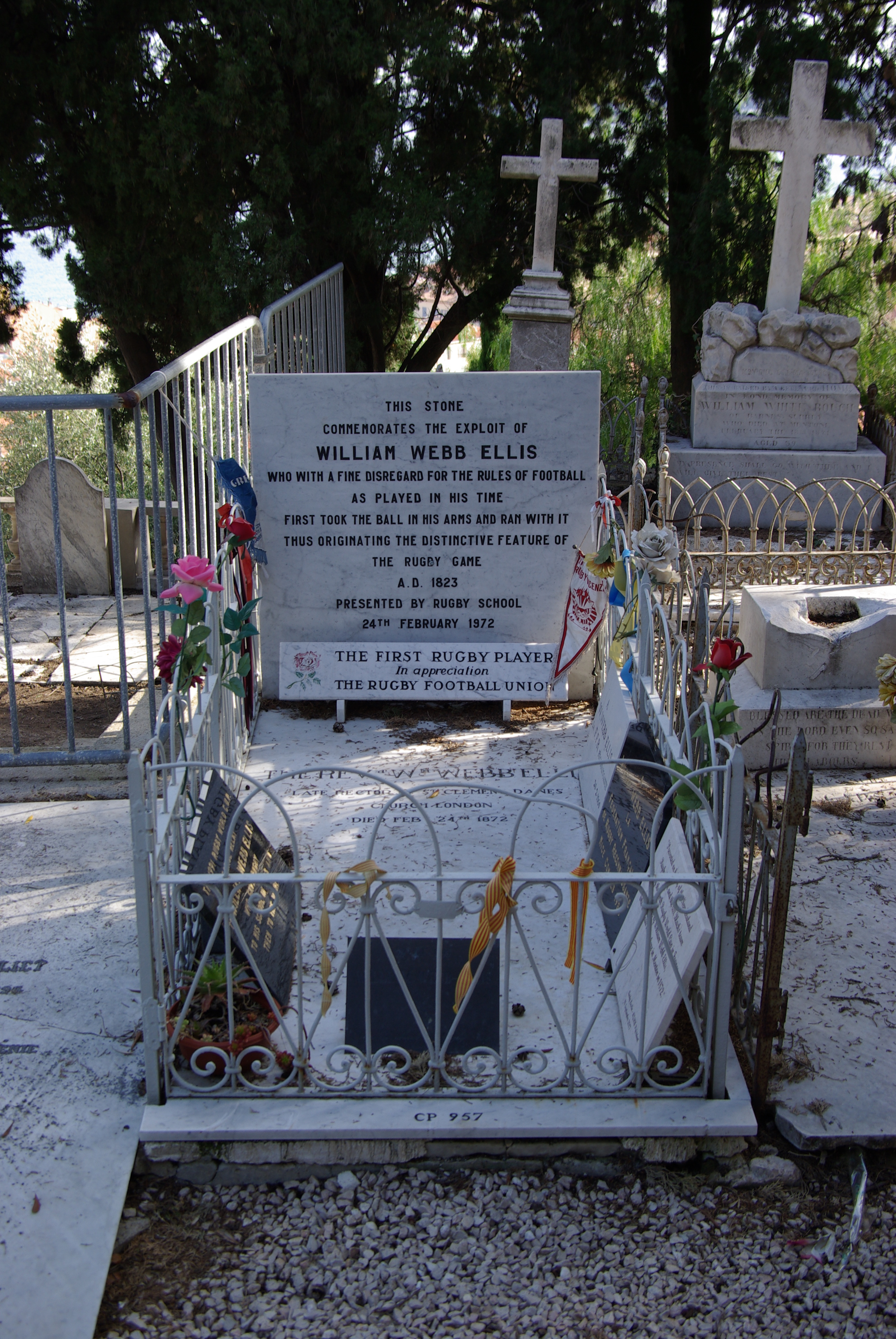
Webb Ellis grave in le cimetière du vieux château at Menton in Alpes Maritimes

William's father James became a Lieutenant of the 3rd Dragoon Guards in 1809, joining them in Portugal, he was killed during the Peninsular War in a cavalry action near Albuera on 1 July 1812. William's mother, Mrs Ellis, was in receipt of an allowance of £30 from His Majesty's Royal Bounty in recognition of her husband's service, she decided to move to Rugby, Warwickshire, so that William and his elder brother, Thomas, would receive an education at Rugby School with no cost as a local foundationer (i.e. a pupil living within a radius of 10 miles of the Rugby Clock Tower). He attended the school in Town House from 1816 to 1825 and was recorded as being a good scholar and cricketer, although it was noted that he was "rather inclined to take unfair advantage at cricket". The incident in which William Webb Ellis supposedly caught the ball in his arms during a football match (which was allowed) and ran with it (which was not) is supposed to have happened in the latter half of 1823.

After leaving Rugby in 1826, he went to Brasenose College, Oxford, aged 20. He played cricket for his college, and for Oxford University against Cambridge University in a match in 1827. He graduated with a B.A. in 1829 and received his M.A. in 1831. He entered the Church and became chaplain of St George's Chapel, Albemarle Street, London (closed c. 1909), and then rector of St Clement Danes in the Strand. He became well known as a low church evangelical clergyman. In 1855, he became rector of Magdalen Laver in Essex. A picture of him (the only known portrait) appeared in the Illustrated London News in 1854 after he gave a particularly stirring sermon on the subject of the Crimean War.

He never married and died in the south of France in 1872, leaving an estate of £9,000, mostly to various charities. His grave in le cimetière du vieux château at Menton in Alpes Maritimes was rediscovered by Ross McWhirter in 1958, was renovated by the Riviera Hash House Harriers in 2003 and is now maintained by the French Rugby Federation.

== Legacy, legend and the origins of rugby football ==
=== Accounts by Matthew Bloxam ===
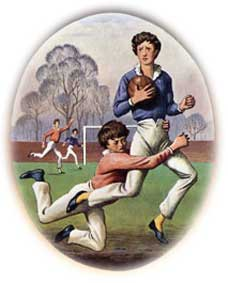
Webb-Ellis carries the ball during a school football match played in 1823. According to legend, this action created the rugby style of play

In 1876 Arthur George Guillemard, a former Rugby School pupil and one of the founders of the Rugby Union, wrote to The Standard asking what the origins of rugby football were. Matthew Bloxam, another former pupil of Rugby School and antiquarian, replied to this letter in The Standard that the handling game was not known during his time at the School. Matthew Bloxam attended Rugby School from 1813-1821.

Matthew Bloxam, on 10 October 1876, wrote to The Meteor, the Rugby School magazine, that since writing to The Standard, he had learnt that the change in the rules so as to authorise the ball being taken up and carried by hand, and the holder running with it, had "...originated with a town boy or foundationer of the name of Ellis, Webb Ellis".

On 22 December 1880, in another letter to The Meteor, Bloxam elaborates on the story:

“In the latter half year of 1823, some 57 years ago, originated, though without premeditation, that change in one of the rules, which more than any other has since distinguished the Rugby School game from the Association Rules.

A boy of the name of Ellis, William Webb Ellis, a town boy and a foundationer, who at the age of nine entered the School after the midsummer holidays in 1816, who in the second half year of 1823, was, I believe, a praepostor, whilst playing Bigside at football in that half year, caught the ball in his arms. This being so, according to the then rules, he ought to have retired back as far as he pleased, without parting with the ball, for the combatants on the opposite side could only advance to the spot where he had caught the ball, and were unable to rush forward till he had either punted it or had placed it for someone else to kick, for it was by means of these placed kicks that most of the goals were in those days kicked, but the moment the ball touched the ground, the opposite side might rush on. Ellis, for the first time, disregarded this rule, and on catching the ball, instead of retiring backwards, rushed forwards with the ball in his hands towards the opposite goal, with what result as to the game I know not, neither do I know how this infringement of a well-known rule was followed up, or when it became as it is now, a standing rule"

— Matthew Bloxam, The Meteor December 22 1880

As explained by Bloxham above, catching and handling the ball were already permitted by the rules, but only by carrying the ball in a backwards direction. The football being played at Rugby School was not an entirely non-handling football (soccer) code. Bloxham does not say, nor does the Rugby School plaque (see below), that Webb Ellis during the game picked the ball up from the ground.

Matthew Bloxam talked about the invention of rugby football again in 1883 at a lecture to the Rugby School Natural History Society. In his accounts he dates the invention of the game as taking place around 1823 to 1826. HIs accounts of the invention of the game were reviewed and further investigated in 1895.

=== 1895 investigation ===
In 1889 The Old Rugbeian Society was founded by members of the School's alumni, their aim was to fund the appointment of a cricket professional to coach pupils in the sport. While cricket was the society's original focus, they soon turned their attention to rugby football and its origins.

In 1895 the Badminton Library published "Athletics and Football" in which the author Mr Montague Sherman gave an account of the origins of rugby football. This prompted the Old Rugbeian Society to appoint a sub-committee to investigate the origins of the game. Further reasons for the investigation are recorded in the published report and do not include the Great Schism of 1893.

However, it has been suggested by Dunning and Sheard (2005) that it was no coincidence that this investigation was conducted in 1895, at a time when divisions within the sport led to the schism: the split into the sports of rugby league and rugby union. Dunning and Sheard suggest that the endorsement of a "reductionist" origin myth by the Rugbeians was an attempt to assert their school's position and authority over a sport that they were losing control of.

The appointment sub-committee considered several sources of information on the development of the sport and wrote to Old Rugbeians who attended the School in the 1820s and 1830s asking for their memories of the game. William Webb Ellis's closest contemporary Rev Harris confirmed that at the time catching and running forward with the ball was illegal and William Webb Ellis "was an admirable cricketer but was generally regarded as inclined to take unfair advantages at football".

Thomas Hughes (author of Tom Brown's Schooldays) was asked to comment on the game as played when he attended the school (1834–1842). He is quoted as saying "In my first year, 1834, running with the ball to get a try by touching down within goal was not absolutely forbidden, but a jury of Rugby boys of that day would almost certainly have found a verdict of 'justifiable homicide' if a boy had been killed in running in." Thomas Hughes also wrote that he made the rule legal when he was captain of Big-Side in 1839-1841, running was made lawful with the following restrictions:

“(1) that the ball must be caught on the bound, (2) that the catcher was not “off his side,” (3) that there should be no “handing on,” but the catcher must carry the ball in and “touch down” himself.”

— Thomas Hughes, Thomas Hughes in a letter published in The Old Rugbeian Society, The Origin of Rugby Football Report of The Subcommittee of the Old Rugbeian Society appointed in 1895

Following the investigation and the published report in 1897, the old Rugbeian Society concluded that Matthew Bloxam's account, written in 1880, was correct and placed a plaque on the Close in 1900 stating William Webb Ellis's actions originated the distinctive feature of the game in 1823.

=== Alternative theories ===
==== Caid ====
One theory is that Webb Ellis was playing the ancient Irish game Caid, which was similar to Rugby. His father may have been familiar with this game as he had been stationed in Ireland as a soldier with the Dragoons.

==== James Mackie ====
James Mackie (aka as Jen Mackie), a British politician and former Rugby School pupil is referenced in the 1895 investigation's published report of 1897 by his fellow Old Rugbeians as a great player. In a letter to the Investigation Thomas Hughes referred to Jem Mackie and practice of running in as follows:

“In my first year, 1834, running with the ball to get a try by touching down within goal was not absolutely forbidden, but a jury of Rugby boys of that day would almost certainly have found a verdict of “justifiable homicide” if a boy had been killed in running in. The practice grew, and was tolerated more and more, and indeed became rather popular in 1838—39 from the prowess of Jem Mackie, the great! runner in.’ … [Jem] was very fleet of foot as well as brawny of shoulder, so that when he got hold of the ball it was very hard to stop his rush. He was a School House and Sixth Form boy, therefore on the numerically absurdly weak side in those two most exciting matches of that time."

— Thomas Hughes, Letter by Thomas Hughes, published in The Old Rugbeian Society, The Origin of Rugby Football Report of The Subcommittee of the Old Rugbeian Society appointed in 1895, A J Lawrence: Rugby (1897)

The report also mentions that other pupils were known to run with the ball in the 1830s, however, the move was not considered legal. Thomas Hughes stated that it was made lawful with restrictions when he was Captain of the Big-Side in 1840-1841. The very first written laws of football as played at Rugby School were written and adopted by the Sixth Levee on 28th August 1845. England Rugby says that William Webb Ellis's action did not lead to any immediate change in the rules but may well have inspired later imitators, though not Mackie, as Thomas Hughes said the Webb Ellis story had not survived into his own time.

An article by Gordon Rayner in The Sunday Telegraph about the origin of Rugby football says that Thomas Hughes told the 1895 investigation that in 1838–1839 a Rugby School boy called Jem Mackie "was the first great runner-in", and that later (in or before 1842) Jem Mackie was expelled from Rugby School for an unspecified incident; in 1845 boys at the school first wrote down an agreed set of rules for the version of football played at Rugby School, which is now rugby football. Gordon Rayner says that the reason for Jem Mackie's expulsion may have damaged Mackie's reputation so much that Bloxam transferred Mackie's part in inventing Rugby football to Webb Ellis, and that a big donation by Bloxam to Rugby School's library may have influenced school official acceptance of this Webb Ellis version.

Another theory is that Mackie's role may have been disregarded because the committee was seeking to prove Rugby School had invented the game, and thus may have preferred the earliest possible date.

According to former student Bernhard Wise in his contemporary article, Rugby in the 1870s about life at Rugby School, it remained an undecided point as to whether the innovator was Webb Ellis or Mackie.

=== Plaque ===
A plaque, erected in 1900, at Rugby School, bears the inscription:

THIS STONE
COMMEMORATES THE EXPLOIT OF
WILLIAM WEBB ELLIS
WHO WITH A FINE DISREGARD FOR THE RULES OF FOOTBALL
AS PLAYED IN HIS TIME
FIRST TOOK THE BALL IN HIS ARMS AND RAN WITH IT
THUS ORIGINATING THE DISTINCTIVE FEATURE OF
THE RUGBY GAME
A.D. 1823

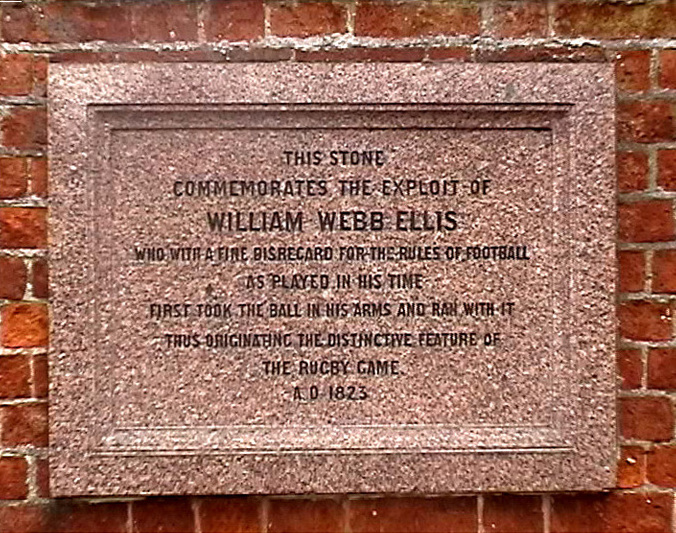
Image of the plaque at Rugby School

== Statue ==
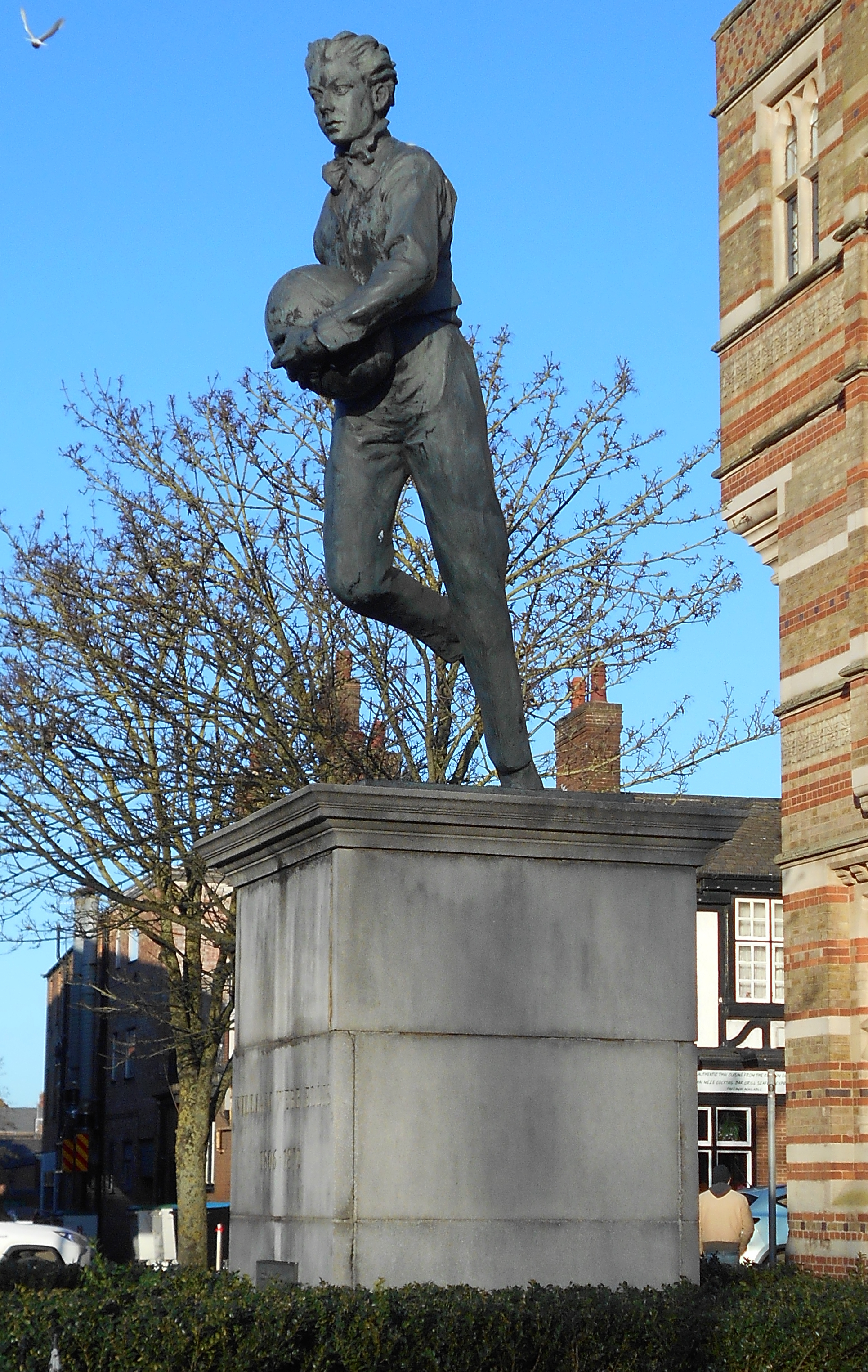
Statue of William Webb Ellis outside Rugby School

A bronze statue depicting a young Webb Ellis running with a ball stands on the corner of Dunchurch Road, outside Rugby School. It was produced by the sculptor Graham Ibbeson who won a competition to produce it. It was unveiled in 1997. The statue is owned by Rugby Borough Council.

== See also ==
- Abner Doubleday, sometimes apocryphally credited with inventing baseball
- Tom Wills, attended Rugby School and pioneered Australian rules football
- Webb Ellis Rugby Football Museum, museum in Rugby named after Ellis
