= John Burgh (civil servant) =

Sir John Burgh KCMG
- Born: Karl Hans Schweinburg; 9 December 1925; Vienna, Austria
- Died: 12 April 2013 (aged 87)
- Education: Sibford School; London School of Economics

Sir John Charles Burgh, KCMG (9 December 1925 – 12 April 2013) was an Austrian-born refugee who became a senior member of the British Civil Service as director-general of the British Council (1980–1987). He later served as president of Trinity College, Oxford (1987–1996).

== Early life ==
Burgh was born Karl Hans Schweinburg on 9 December 1925 in Vienna, Austria. His parents were Jews who had converted to Roman Catholicism. His father, who had practised as a barrister, died in 1937. His mother had him and his sister Lucy baptised in the Church of England. From his family's flat that overlooked Vienna's Ringstrasse, Burgh saw Adolf Hitler touring the city following the 1938 Anschluss that annexed Austria into Nazi Germany.

With the help of Quakers, Burgh and his sister moved to Britain in late 1938. Their mother followed on six months later. He was educated at the Quaker Sibford School in Sibford Ferris, Oxfordshire. During his time at school, he became fluent in English and did well in his exams. However, his mother could not afford the fees for him to remain beyond 15 years old and so he left in 1941. He then began work in an aircraft factory, which he continued until the end of World War II.

In 1946, he gained a place at the London School of Economics on an evening course. He studied economics under Harold Laski, who would help him win a bursary so that he could continue his studies full-time the following year. In 1949, he was elected General Secretary of LSE Students' Union. He graduated with a Bachelor of Science (BSc) in Government in 1950.

== Career ==
Following graduation, Burgh joined the administrative branch of the Civil Service. He spent his early years at the Board of Trade. In 1964, he began serving in the Department of Economic Affairs as Principal Private Secretary to the Secretary of State for Economic Affairs George Brown. In 1968, he worked out of the Department of Employment as Principal Private Secretary to the Secretary of State for Employment Barbara Castle. He worked with her on the white paper In Place of Strife. He worked for the next Secretary of State for Employment Robert Carr. With him, he helped introduce the Industrial Relations Act 1971.

He spent two years on secondment to Community Relations Commission where he served as Deputy chairman from 1971 to 1972. He returned to the Civil Service as the deputy secretary in charge of the Central Policy Review Staff under Lord Rothschild. In 1974, he transferred to the Department of Prices and Consumer Protection where he was deputy permanent secretary to the Secretary of State for Prices and Consumer Protection Shirley Williams. He was personally chosen by Williams as part of her agreement to head the new department.

He was director-general of the British Council from 1980 to 1987, and president of Trinity College, Oxford, from 1987 to 1996.

In 1987 he received an Honorary Doctorate from the University of Bath.

== Later life ==
Burgh died on 12 April 2013 of pneumonia. He was aged 87.

== Personal life ==
In 1957, Burgh married Ann Sturge. Together they had two daughters.

== Honours ==
In the 1982 New Year Honours, Burgh was appointed Knight Commander of the Order of St Michael and St George (KCMG).

Academic offices
Preceded by Anthony Quinton	President of Trinity College, Oxford; 1987–1996	Succeeded by Michael Beloff
