= Tripontium =

Town in Roman Britain

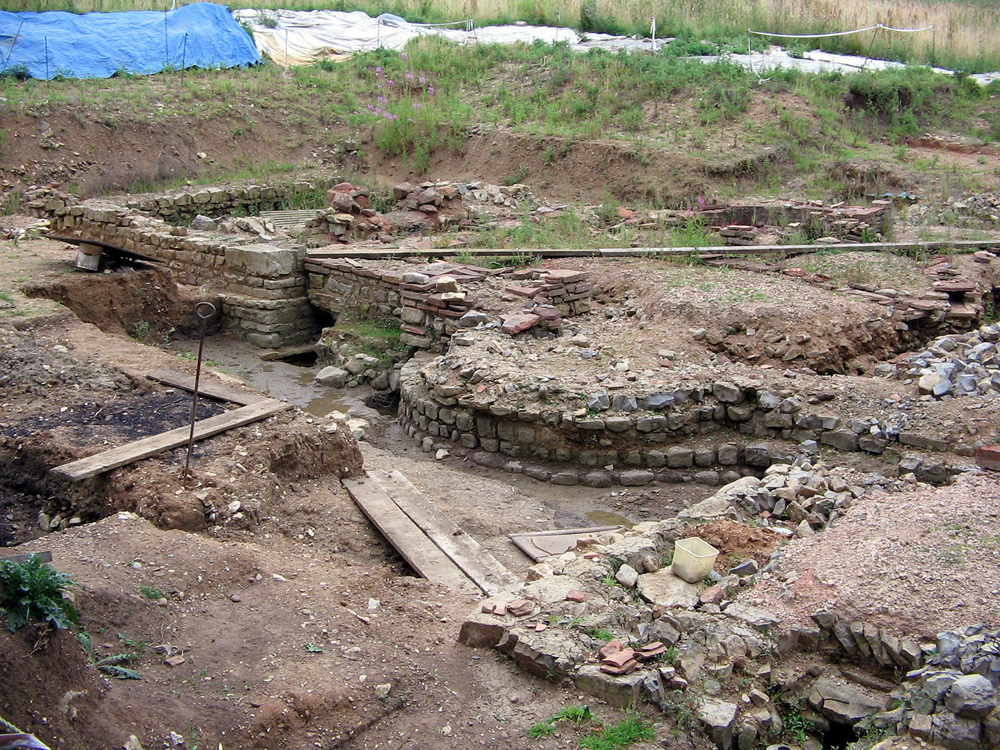
- Remains of the bath houses being excavated in 2005.

- Location within England
- 52.409152°N 1.212683°W
- Type: Settlement
- Periods: Roman Empire
- Location: Warwickshire, England
- Region: Britannia

History
- Built: Around AD 50
- Abandoned: 4th century

Site notes
- Owner: Commercial company, multiple owners
- Public access: none

Tripontium (Latin for "Place of three bridges") was a town in Roman Britain. It lay on the Roman road later called Watling Street (and known today as the A5) at a site now chiefly within the civil parish of Churchover in the English county of Warwickshire and partly in Leicestershire, some 3.4 miles north-east of Rugby and 3.1 miles south of Lutterworth.

== Character ==
Tripontium was established as a military frontier post soon after the Roman invasion of Britain in AD 47. Its name references the bridges over the River Avon and two of its tributaries. Tripontium later developed into a civilian town which was inhabited for around 400 years, peaking in the 2nd century, before being abandoned in the late 4th century when the Romans left Britain.

== Excavations ==
The exact position of Tripontium remained a mystery for centuries, but it was found by the antiquarian Matthew Bloxam in 1836. Excavation works at the site were begun in 1961 by the Rugby Archaeological Society and continued until 2006.

From its out-of-the-way location, it was initially thought that Tripontium was a small wayside settlement of little importance. Excavations of the site have, however, revealed that it was an important Romano-British town, with large public bath houses, an extensive administrative building, and an inn (mansio) . Numerous pieces of pottery, Roman coins, and other remains have been found. Some of the area of the town has been destroyed by gravel extraction in modern times and part of the site is unavailable for excavation. Nevertheless, it seems highly likely that more buildings, such as the remains of a temple or a forum, remain to be found at the site. The excavation of Tripontium has been the largest of its type to be carried out by an amateur archaeological society.

Tripontium was probably the most important Roman settlement in the area. The town is some 8 miles (13 km) south of Venonae (High Cross), the point at which Watling Street crossed the Fosse Way. The large size of the bathhouses and inn have led historians to conclude that Tripontium is likely to have been an important stopping-place for travellers, both military and civilian. It was probably also an administrative centre for the surrounding area. The town was mentioned as a stopping place in the Antonine Itineraries, a third century document which recorded the places the Roman Emperors stopped and those they passed through.

The site is a scheduled monument. It has been placed on the Heritage at Risk Register due to the risks from unlicensed metal detecting and its condition is declining.

The site is not open to the public, but many of the finds from the excavations are on display at the Rugby Art Gallery and Museum and the Lutterworth Museum.

Watling Street north of St Albans. The map shows the Roman towns established along Watling Street by the end of the first century AD.
