= Matthew Bloxam =

British archeologist (1805-1888)

Matthew Holbeche Bloxam (12 May 1805 – 24 April 1888), a native of Rugby, Warwickshire, England, was a Warwickshire antiquary and amateur archeologist, author of a popular guide to Gothic architecture. He was the original source of the legend of William Webb Ellis' invention of the game of Rugby football.

== Biography ==
Bloxam was born on 12 May 1805 at Rugby, son of the Rev. Richard Rouse Bloxam, an assistant master at Rugby School, and his wife Ann, sister of Sir Thomas Lawrence He was one of ten children, his brothers including Andrew Bloxam and John Rouse Bloxam.

Bloxam was educated at Elborow School before attending Rugby School between 1813 and 1820. In 1821 he was articled to George Harris, a solicitor in Rugby. He did not find success in the profession when he went into practice on his own account, and in 1831 he became clerk of the court, a post he held for 40 years.

He is remembered as an antiquarian on Rugby and the surrounding area. In 1836 he successfully located the Roman town of Tripontium nearby. His work was published in two books and many journal articles; although many of his conclusions are now thought doubtful, his collection of archaeological finds still exists. He lived in what is now the Percival Guildhouse, while his brother ran a boarding school next door in what became the public library. A new library replaced the old one in 2000 and a life-size statue of Bloxham engaged in his archaeological work greets visitors to the Rugby museum located in the new library complex.

== The Principles of Gothic Architecture ==
While visiting country churches to consult their registers in the course of his professional work, Bloxam began making the observations which led to his subsequent knowledge of ecclesiastical architecture. While still under articles he began collecting the notes which he was to publish in 1829 as The Principles of Gothic Architecture elucidated by Question and Answer (Leicester, 1829). It was described by Charles Locke Eastlake as "a small but well digested volume admirably adapted for the use of amateurs". The book proved popular, leading to a second edition in 1835. In 1844 the book reached a ninth edition, in which the question-and-answer format was abandoned, under the amended title of The Principles of Gothic Ecclesiastical Architecture with an explanation of technical terms, and a centenary of ancient terms. A German translation of the seventh edition was published at Leipzig in 1847. At the suggestion of Sir George Gilbert Scott, Bloxam set about preparing an enlarged edition, which eventually appeared in three volumes in 1882, containing additional chapters on vestments and on church arrangements. It was illustrated with wood engravings by Thomas Orlando Sheldon Jewitt.

== William Webb Ellis story ==
Bloxam is the sole source of the story that the game of Rugby football had its origins in the moment when William Webb Ellis picked up the ball during a game of football at Rugby School. In October 1876, in an effort to refute the assertion that carrying the ball had been an ancient tradition, he wrote to The Meteor, the Rugby School magazine, that he had learnt from an unnamed source that the change from a kicking game to a handling game had "..originated with a town boy or foundationer of the name of Ellis, William Webb Ellis". In December 1880, in another letter to the Meteor, Bloxam elaborated on the story:

A boy of the name Ellis – William Webb Ellis – a town boy and a foundationer, .... whilst playing Bigside at football in that half-year [1823], caught the ball in his arms. This being so, according to the then rules, he ought to have retired back as far as he pleased, without parting with the ball, for the combatants on the opposite side could only advance to the spot where he had caught the ball, and were unable to rush forward till he had either punted it or had placed it for some one else to kick, for it was by means of these placed kicks that most of the goals were in those days kicked, but the moment the ball touched the ground the opposite side might rush on. Ellis, for the first time, disregarded this rule, and on catching the ball, instead of retiring backwards, rushed forwards with the ball in his hands towards the opposite goal, with what result as to the game I know not, neither do I know how this infringement of a well-known rule was followed up, or when it became, as it is now, a standing rule.

== Death ==
Bloxam died on 24 April 1888, and was buried in the grounds of the chapel at Brownsover.
