= Hilary Boulding =

British academic

Dame Hilary Boulding DBE FLSW

President of Trinity College, Oxford
- In office 2017–2025
- Preceded by: Sir Ivor Roberts
- Succeeded by: Sir Robert Chote

Personal details
- Born: 25 January 1957 (age 69)
- Citizenship: United Kingdom
- Education: Heaton Manor School
- Alma mater: St Hilda's College, Oxford

Dame Hilary Boulding, DBE FLSW (born 25 January 1957) is a British academic administrator and former media professional who served as the President of Trinity College, University of Oxford from 2017 to 2025. She formerly worked for the BBC and Arts Council England, and served as Principal of the Royal Welsh College of Music and Drama.

== Early life and education ==
Boulding was born on 25 January 1957. She was educated at Heaton School, a state school in Newcastle-upon-Tyne, England. She studied music at St Hilda's College, Oxford, graduating with a Bachelor of Arts (BA) degree.

== Career ==
=== Media career ===
Having left university, Boulding joined BBC Scotland: she worked as a television director from 1981 to 1985, and a television producer from 1985 to 1992. She moved to BBC Wales, where she was Head of Arts and Music from 1992 to 1997. Then, from 1997 to 1999, she was Commissioning Editor, Music (Policy) at BBC Radio 3. In 1999, Boulding left the BBC to join the Arts Council of England as Director of Music. The organisation was renamed Arts Council England in 2002, when the regional arts boards were merged into it.

=== Academic career ===
In July 2007, Boulding was appointed the Principal of the Royal Welsh College of Music & Drama (RWCMD). During her time in charge, she oversaw £22.5 million of development including the building of a 450-seat concert hall and a 160-seat theatre.

In September 2016, it was announced that Boulding had been elected as the next President of Trinity College, Oxford, in succession to Sir Ivor Roberts. This made her the first woman in its 462-year history to head the college. She took up the appointment on 1 August 2017. During her presidency the college's estate was substantially developed with the opening of the £30 million Levine Building in 2022. She stood down as president in August 2025.

== Personal life ==
In 2015, Boulding married John Summers, the chief executive of the Halle Orchestra.

== Honours ==
In the 2017 Queen's Birthday Honours, Boulding was appointed a Dame Commander of the Order of the British Empire (DBE) "for services to education and culture in Wales", and thereby granted the title dame.

In 2019, Boulding was elected a Fellow of the Learned Society of Wales.

Academic offices
Preceded by Edmond Fivet	Principal of the Royal Welsh College of Music & Drama; 2007 to 2017	Succeeded by TBA
Preceded by Sir Ivor Roberts	President of Trinity College, Oxford; 2017 to present	Incumbent
