= Percival Guildhouse =

English adult education centre

Coordinates: 52.371267°N 1.265150°W

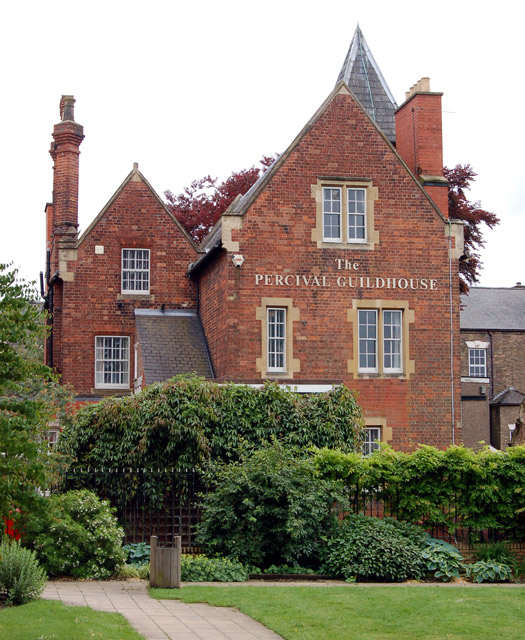
The Percival Guildhouse

The Percival Guildhouse is an independent adult education centre and registered charity in Rugby, Warwickshire, England.

It is based in a building on St Matthew Street in the town centre, which dates from the mid-19th century, and which was once the home of the antiquarian Matthew Bloxam (1805-1888). The building itself is grade II listed.

The Percival Guild was founded in 1925 to promote adult education in Rugby, named after John Percival, a former headmaster of Rugby School. Some old boys of Rugby School purchased Bloxam's old home to house the institution creating the Guildhouse.

Today it provides morning, afternoon and evening classes from Monday to Friday in a wide variety of subjects, and has an attached cafe and adjacent gardens which are open to the public, and are alongside the Rugby Art Gallery, Museum & Library.

== Notable people ==
- Maurice Beresford, historian and archaeologist known for his later work on deserted medieval villages including Wharram Percy, served as sub-warden (1942–1943) and then warden (1943–1948) of Percival Guildhouse.
