= Brownlow Atlay =

Brownlow Thomas Atlay (b 10 June 1832 Great Casterton; d. 16 September 1912 Ealing) was Archdeacon of Calcutta from 1883 until 1888.

Atlay was educated at Uppingham School and St John's College, Cambridge and ordained in 1857. After a curacy in Barrow, Suffolk he served with the Indian Ecclesiastical Establishment at Naini Tal before becoming Chaplain of St. Paul's Cathedral, Calcutta. On his return from India he was Vicar of Willesden until he retired in 1902.

He died on 16 September 1912. His older brother was James Atlay (1817 – 1894), Bishop of Hereford.
