= John Percival (bishop) =

English headmaster and bishop (1834–1918)

The Right Reverend John Percival
- Bishop of Hereford
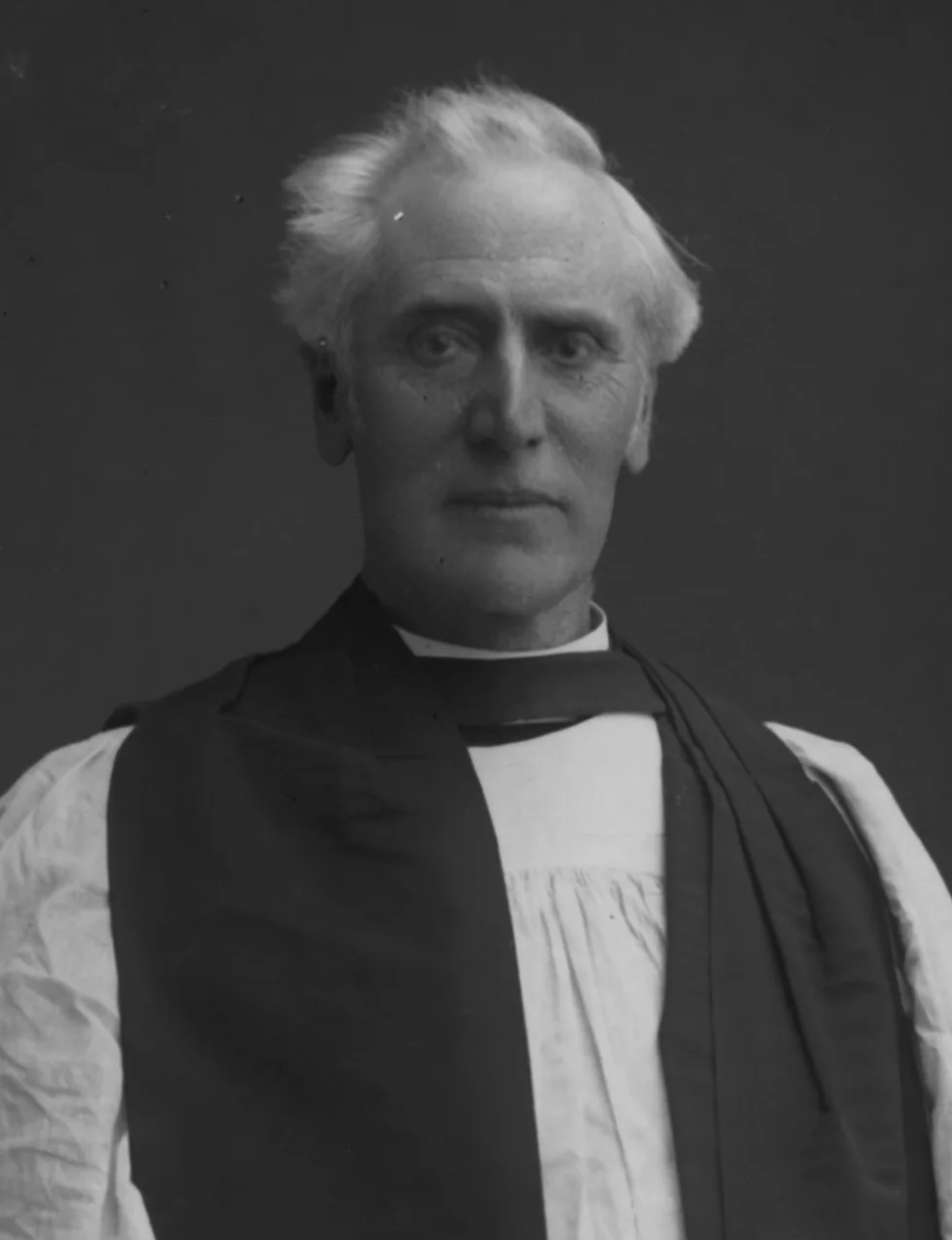
- Portrait by Alexander Bassano, c. 1898
- Church: Church of England
- See: Hereford
- In office: 1895–1917
- Predecessor: James Atlay
- Successor: Hensley Henson
- Previous posts: Presidency of Trinity College, Oxford; Headmaster of Rugby School

Orders
- Ordination: 1860
- Consecration: 25 March 1895

Personal details
- Born: 27 September 1834 Brough Sowerby, Westmorland, England
- Died: 3 December 1918 (aged 84) Oxford, England
- Spouse: Louisa Holland; Georgina Symonds
- Children: 8
- Education: The Queen's College, Oxford

John Percival (27 September 1834 – 3 December 1918) was the first headmaster of Clifton College, where he made his reputation as a great educator. In his 17 years at Clifton numbers rose to 680. He accepted the presidency of Trinity College, Oxford, to recover from his years at Clifton. It was from Trinity that he went to Rugby to become headmaster of Rugby School before becoming Bishop of Hereford.

== Early life ==
Percival was born in Brough Sowerby, near Kirkby Stephen, Westmorland, England. He was raised on his uncle's farm after the death of his mother when he was very young. He was educated at Appleby grammar school, before winning a scholarship to The Queen's College, Oxford, in 1854. He obtained first-class degrees in classics and mathematics and was elected to a fellowship by the college in 1858. Recuperating from overwork in Pau, France, in the following winter, he met Louisa Holland, whom he married in 1862.

== Career in education ==
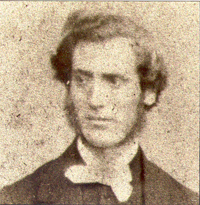
John Percival as Headmaster of Clifton College, 1863

Percival was ordained deacon in 1860 and was offered a position as a master at Rugby School by the headmaster, Frederick Temple. In 1862, Percival was appointed the first headmaster of Clifton College in Bristol, on Temple's recommendation. Percival made this new school into a leading public school and he was also involved with other educational work in the city, helping to found Clifton High School for Girls (established in 1877).

In February 1868, John and Louisa Percival formed a Committee in Bristol to promote the Higher Education of Women, which arranged lectures and other classes from 1870 to help prepare women to prepare for the Higher Education Cambridge Examination. By 1876 this programme had developed to the point that Percival felt able to propose the foundation of University College, Bristol. With Percival's influence, this became 'the first town in England to possess a University College open alike to men and women.'

Percival became President of Trinity College, Oxford, in January 1879. Although he was not always happy as a college head, he was involved in the wider work of the university, chairing the committee that established Somerville Hall in 1879 and promoting the university's adult education work.

In May 1887, Percival became headmaster of Rugby School, succeeding Thomas Jex-Blake. During his time as headmaster, he pursued a vigorous moral crusade. His leadership soon improved the prestige of the school. He attacked "idleness" and "loafing" and, concerned about "impurity", insisted that boys' football shorts should be worn below the knee and secured with elastic. He acquired the nickname "Percival of the knees" as a result.

In 1888, Percival's appointment of Marie Bethell Beauclerc to teach shorthand to classes of one hundred boys was the first appointment of a female teacher in an English boys' public school and the first time shorthand had been taught in any such school.

== Bishop of Hereford ==
Lord Rosebery, the Prime Minister, nominated Percival to be Bishop of Hereford in January 1895. Whilst Queen Victoria was opposed to the idea, since Percival was known to favour the disestablishment of the Church in Wales, Rosebery prevailed. The congé d'élire authorising Percival's appointment passed the Great Seal of the Realm on 18 February 1895. He was consecrated into bishop's orders on Lady Day (25 March), by Edward White Benson, Archbishop of Canterbury, at Westminster Abbey; and he was enthroned at Hereford Cathedral on 25 April.

Percival's time in Hereford was affected by the death of his wife in 1896, and he had difficulties in administering the large rural diocese where his radical political views were often unpopular. Graham Neville characterises him as a 'Low-church Political Liberal'.; in 1901 he publicly criticised the conditions and loss of life in the concentration camps of the Second Boer War. He attracted criticism (including an excommunication by Frank Weston, the bishop of Zanzibar) when he invited nonconformists to take holy communion at Hereford Cathedral to mark the Coronation of George V. He had more success on a national level, elected president of the Educational Science section of the British Association, and championed the cause of adult education in particular – he chaired the first meeting of the Workers' Educational Association in 1903. He was elected an honorary fellow of Queen's College, Oxford in late 1902.

Percival hoped for the Archbishopric of York; indeed felt that it had been promised him, but was disappointed when Cosmo Gordon Lang was given the post in 1909.

Bishops at that time were not only lords but addressed as ‘My Lord Bishop’ and lived in accommodation like the Bishop’s Palace in Hereford. The 1901 Census of England and Wales shows Percival resident in the Palace with his wife, a chaplain and 9 servants.

Percival had been a leading figure in the Church of England Peace League so that when the First World War opened in August, 1914, he was cautious, unlike most of his contemporary bishops, about giving his backing to the War. However, the German attack on Belgium and the ‘Belgian atrocities’ made him commit fully to supporting the British war effort. He wrote, seeking prayers throughout the diocese, ".... for the victory of our sailors and soldiers who are so bravely giving their lives in this terrible conflict, to the cause of righteousness and freedom, and to win for the various nations of Europe in the years to come, the blessings of enduring peace and Christian brotherhood." Percival would lose a son to the War as a result of shelling in November, 1914.

Percival was the godfather of William Temple, Archbishop of Canterbury 1942-4. Temple wrote Percival’s biography.

== Death and burial ==
Percival retired to Oxford in 1917 and died the following year. He was buried in the chapel crypt of Clifton College.

== Marriage and children ==
In 1862 he married Louisa Holland, by whom he had eight children, six of whom survived to adulthood, including:

- Launcelot Jefferson Percival, an international rugby player and later Deputy Clerk of the Closet (Domestic Chaplain to the Sovereign) to King George VI.

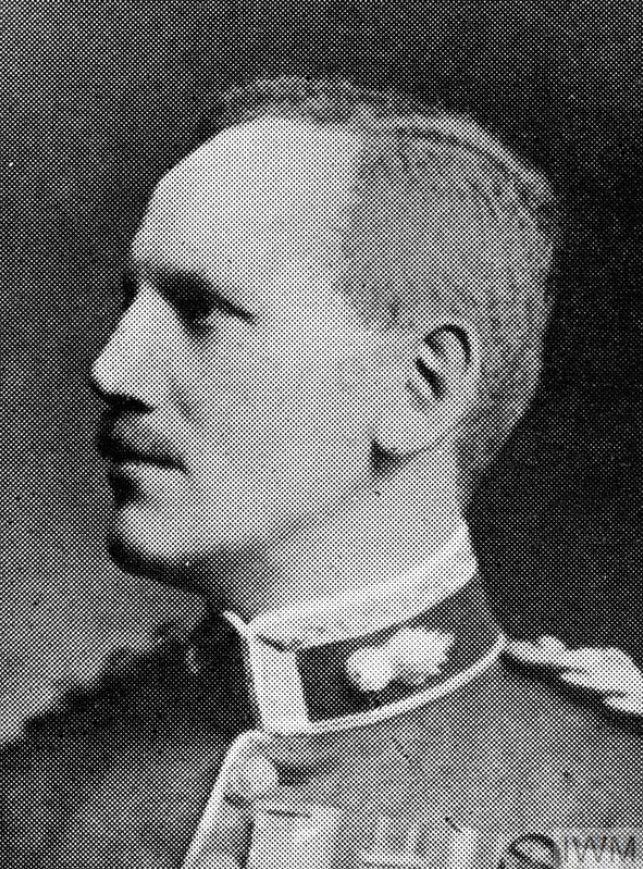
Lt-Col. Arthur Jex-Blake Percival (1871–1914), Northumberland Fusiliers, youngest son of John Percival, killed in action during WWI

- Lt-Col. Arthur Jex-Blake Percival (1871–1914), Northumberland Fusiliers, youngest son, killed in action during the First World War on 31 October 1914 when the Château de Hooge, at Ypres, joint divisional headquarters of the 1st Division and 2nd Division, in which he was serving as General Staff Officer to Major General Monro, Commander of the 2nd Division and later of the 1st Army Corps, was shelled by German forces. His obituary included the following:

Field Marshal Lord Methuen, GCB, GCVO, CMG, wrote: "I had no officer serving under me in the South African War whose service as a regimental officer I valued more highly. He was a born leader of men, of splendid courage, and possessing a character which inspired all with whom he came in contact". General Gorringe, CB, CMG, DSO, said: "He was the best Stall officer I have ever had I don't say this only now. I have said so for some time, and had he been given, as he deserved, a command during the war, he would have won still higher honours". A brother officer wrote: "He and I were in the Egyptian Army together, and I learnt out there to admire his wonderful energy and great strength of character. I shall never forget the day he rode quietly into Wau, in the Bahr-el-Ghezal, on the date he said he would arrive, after a most extraordinary journey, in which his great qualities had had full play. His Arabs simply worshipped him. By his death we have lost one of the best officers in the army, and at a time when men of his type are priceless". Others spoke in these terms: "A very gallant soldier, loyal, straight, and the best of friends, with never an unkind word". "He was one of the few men I have ever met who apparently did not know fear". "The whole army knew of his splendid qualities. I always used to talk of him as the bravest man I have ever known. He simply knew no fear". The Sirdar, Mr Asquith, Lord Lincolnshire, General von Donop, General Monro, General Belfield and many others sent telegrams and letters to Lieutenant Colonel Percival's family expressing their sorrow at his death. A letter from a private in his company sums up the general opinion of this gallant officer: "It is said that there are men who fear not death on the battlefield. Certainly no one could have faced death with more serene courage. His absolute indifference to danger was the theme of frequent discussion among the men. His infectious gaiety — no other word is applicable to his demeanour under fire — made a vivid impression upon us young soldiers".

His first wife Louisa died in 1896, and in 1898/9 he married his second wife, Miss Mary Georgina Symonds.

== See also ==
- Percival Guildhouse - adult education centre in Rugby named after him.

Church of England titles
Preceded by James Atlay	Bishop of Hereford; 1895–1917	Succeeded by Herbert Hensley Henson
Academic offices
New title	Headmaster of Clifton College; 1862–1878	Succeeded by James Wilson
Preceded by Samuel William Wayte	President of Trinity College, Oxford; 1879–1887	Succeeded by Henry George Woods
Preceded by Thomas Jex-Blake	Head Master of Rugby School; 1887–1895	Succeeded by Herbert Armitage James
