= John Shepherd (diplomat) =

British diplomat

Sir John Alan Shepherd, KCVO CMG (born 27 April 1943) is a retired British diplomat.

Born in 1943, Shepherd was educated at Charterhouse, Selwyn College, Cambridge, and Stanford University.

After four years in the merchant navy, he entered HM Diplomatic Service in 1965. He was First Secretary at the Foreign and Commonwealth Office (FCO) from 1973 to 1976, at the British Embassy in the Netherlands from 1977 to 1980 and then in the office of the United Kingdom's Permanent Representative to the European Communities from 1980 to 1982 (where he was also Counsellor from 1982 to 1984).

After three years as Head of the European Communities Department at the FCO, he was appointed the United Kingdom's Ambassador to Bahrain (serving from 1988 to 1991). In the 1989 Birthday Honours, he was appointed a Companion of the Order of St Michael and St George. After Shepherd's posting in Bahrain, he was Minister at the British Embassy in Germany until 1996. After a year as Director, Middle East and North Africa at the FCO, he served as Deputy Under-Secretary from 1997 to 2000, after which he was the United Kingdom's Ambassador to Italy until 2003. He was appointed a Knight Commander of the Royal Victorian Order in October 2000, when Elizabeth II visited Italy.

After leaving the Service, Shepherd was Secretary-General of the Global Leadership Foundation until 2006 and remains a director as of 2019.
