= Ivor Roberts (diplomat) =

British diplomat

Sir Ivor Roberts KCMG FCIL
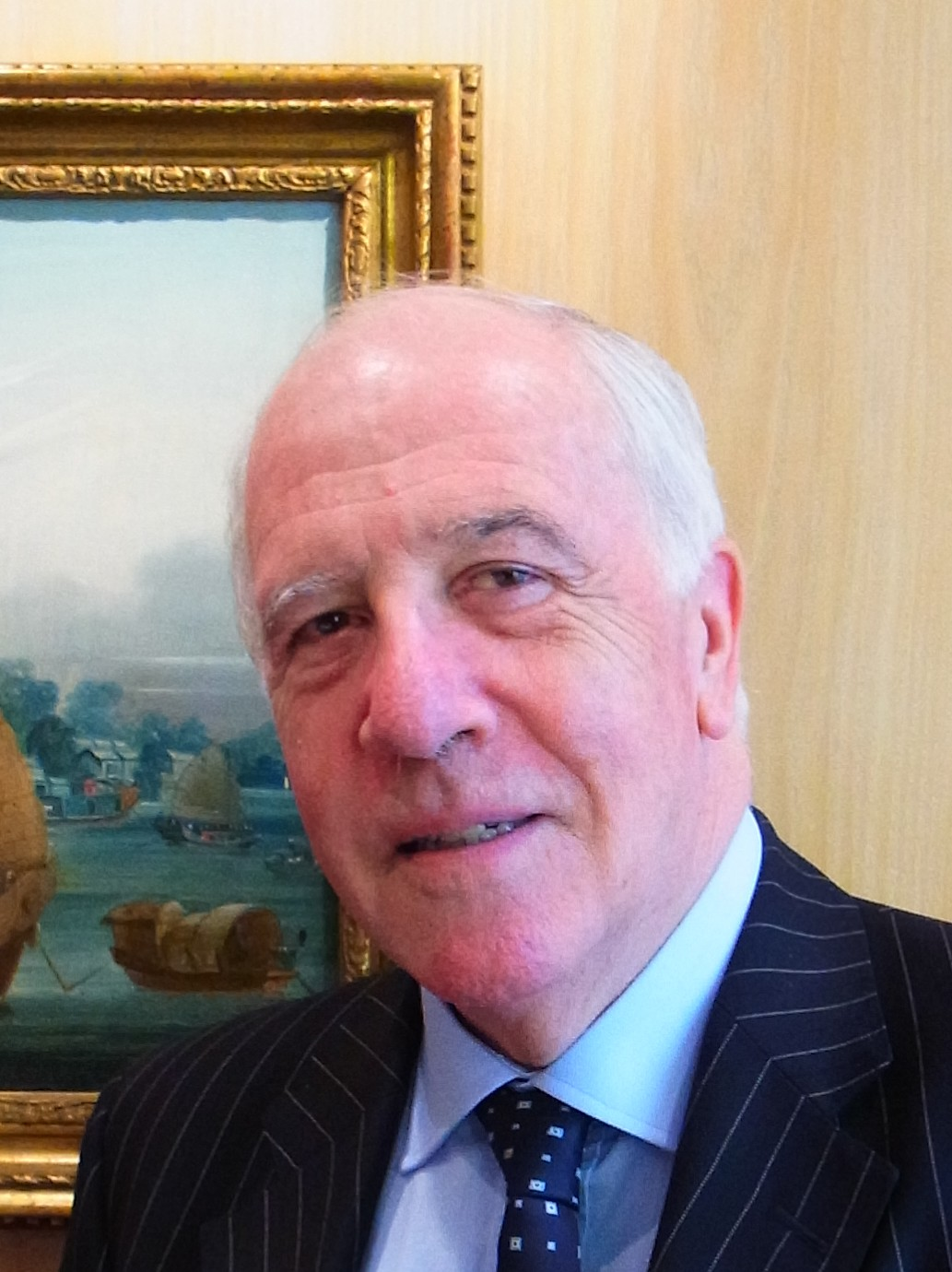
- Sir Ivor in London, November 2011

British Ambassador to Italy
- In office 2003–2006
- Monarch: Elizabeth II
- Prime Minister: Tony Blair
- Preceded by: John Shepherd
- Succeeded by: Edward Chaplin

British Ambassador to Ireland
- In office 1999–2003
- Monarch: Elizabeth II
- Prime Minister: Tony Blair
- Preceded by: Veronica Sutherland
- Succeeded by: Stewart Eldon

British Ambassador to Yugoslavia
- In office 1994–1997
- Monarch: Elizabeth II
- Prime Minister: John Major
- Preceded by: New Mission
- Succeeded by: Brian Donnelly

Personal details
- Born: Ivor Anthony Roberts; 24 September 1946 (age 79) Liverpool, England
- Citizenship: United Kingdom; Ireland
- Spouse: Elizabeth Smith (m. 1974)
- Children: 3
- Education: St Mary's College, Crosby
- Alma mater: Keble College, Oxford

Sir Ivor Anthony Roberts KCMG FCIL (born 24 September 1946) is a retired British diplomat and the former President of Trinity College, Oxford. He was previously British Ambassador to Yugoslavia, Ireland, and Italy. He was knighted in 2000. In addition to his British citizenship, he is now an Irish citizen.

== Education ==
Born in Liverpool, Roberts was educated at St Mary's College, Crosby and the University of Oxford (Keble College, now Honorary Fellow), graduating with a degree in Modern Languages in 1968 and proceeded to take his MA in 1972.

== Diplomatic career ==
Roberts joined the Foreign and Commonwealth Office (FCO) as Third Secretary in 1968. He went to study Arabic at MECAS in the Lebanon in 1969, and was posted to Paris in 1970. He was acting Head of Chancery in Luxembourg in 1973 before returning later that year to the FCO to serve firstly in Eastern European and Soviet Department (Balkans desk), then in Western European Department (German desk) and subsequently in European Integration Department, where he worked on the European Community's Common Agricultural Policy and the European Parliament. He was appointed First Secretary at the British High Commission in Canberra in 1978. In 1980 he was posted temporarily to the newly independent Pacific state of Vanuatu (formerly New Hebrides) as Political Adviser at the time of a rebellion. He returned to Canberra as Head of the Economic and Commercial Department and Agricultural Adviser until 1982. He then returned to London and took up the post of Deputy Head of News Department in the FCO.

From 1989 to 1993 he was Minister in the British Embassy in Madrid. He was appointed Chargé d'Affaires and Consul-General in Belgrade in March 1994, and after recognition of the Federal Republic of Yugoslavia by the United Kingdom, he became Ambassador. During his time at Belgrade he conducted negotiations on behalf of the international mediators (David Owen and Carl Bildt) with both the Yugoslav authorities and the Bosnian Serbs.

Roberts was also involved in the negotiations for the release of British soldiers held hostage by the Bosnian Serbs in May/June 1995. He left Belgrade at the end of 1997. In 1998–99 he took a sabbatical year as Senior Associate Member of St Antony's College, Oxford.

Roberts returned as Ambassador to Ireland 1999–2003, and to Italy from March 2003 until his retirement in 2006.

== After retirement ==
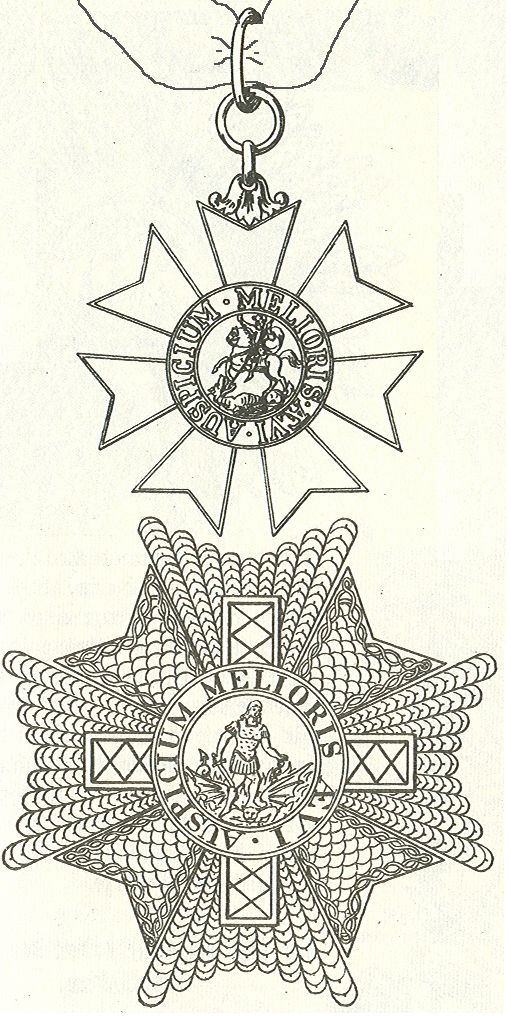
KCMG Badge and Breast Star

After Sir Ivor retired from HM Diplomatic Service in September 2006 he took up the post of President of Trinity College, Oxford.

On 24 September 2006 (his 60th birthday), The Observer's Pendennis column reported that, following his outspoken valedictory report, the FCO had abandoned the centuries-old tradition of allowing departing diplomats to speak their minds. In April 2007, The Independent confirmed the story.

In April 2017, Roberts announced that he had taken Irish citizenship following the Brexit result. The citizenship arises from Roberts's father, who was born in Belfast.

== Affiliations ==
Sir Ivor was the Chairman of the Council of the British School at Rome and a Patron of the Venice in Peril Fund. He is also a member of the Board of the King's College Group in Madrid and was a Member of the International Advisory Board of The Independent News and Media Group.

Roberts is an advisory board member of the Counter Extremism Project.

== Family ==
Roberts married Elizabeth Smith, a scholar of French poetry and formerly a diplomat in the Australian Foreign Service, in 1974. Lady Roberts is a writer and lecturer on Balkan politics. The couple have two sons and a daughter.

== Publications ==
In 2010, Roberts edited the sixth edition of Satow's Diplomatic Practice, originally written in 1917 by Sir Ernest Satow and widely used in embassies throughout the world (Oxford University Press: 2009; ISBN 978-0-19-955927-5). It was reviewed by Sir Jeremy Greenstock later the same year. The seventh centenary edition, also edited by Roberts, appeared in 2017 (ISBN 9780198821953). His memoir of his years in the Balkans, Conversations with Milosevic, was published in 2016.

== See also ==
- List of Ambassadors from the United Kingdom to Ireland

Diplomatic posts
Preceded by John Shepherd	British Ambassador to Italy; 2003–2006	Succeeded by Edward Chaplin
Preceded by Veronica Sutherland	British Ambassador to Ireland; 1999–2003	Succeeded by Stewart Eldon
Preceded by New Mission	British Ambassador to the Federal Republic of Yugoslavia; 1994–1997	Succeeded by Brian Donnelly
Academic offices
Preceded by Michael Beloff	President of Trinity College, Oxford; 2006–2017	Succeeded by Dame Hilary Boulding
