= Samuel William Wayte =

Samuel William Wayte (28 October 1819 – 1898) was an English academic administrator at the University of Oxford.

At Trinity College, Oxford, Wayte was a Scholar from 1838 to 1842 and a Fellow from 1842 to 1866. He was Secretary to the Commissioners from 1854 to 1858 and in 1866 he was elected President of Trinity College in succession to John Wilson. Wayte retired as President in 1878, announcing his retirement decision in August of that year.

Wilson and Wayte, though opposed in views on most subjects, acted together in improving the financial position of the college by such methods as the institution of a Redemption Fund to run out the old leases for lives, which were still continued in many of the richer colleges; but their efforts were almost brought to naught by the agricultural depression of the seventies. A long series of appeals and counter-appeals, mostly on technical matters, between the President and the fellows led to Wilson's retirement in 1866. Under Mr. Wayte (1866–78) no important changes took place; but the reputation of Trinity was well preserved both by a series of efficient officers and by the admission of a large proportion of able undergraduates, such as—in the same year—three future bishops, Randall Davidson of Rochester, Winchester, and Canterbury, E. S. Gibson of Gloucester, and W. W. Perrín of British Columbia and Willesden. Three more bishops, C. Geore (Worcester, Birmingham, and Oxford), A. Robertson (Exeter), and H. Whitehead (Madras), were elected to clerical fellowships in three successive years. A brilliant scholar of 1861, R. W. Raper, became an influential fellow, tutor, bursar, and Vice-President from 1871 to 1915.The Commission of 1878 whose recommendations became effective in 1882 abolished the life tenure of fellowships and, except for the chaplain-fellow, the obligation to take Holy Orders. It distinguished official, non-official, and research fellowships, permitted marriage subject to certain conditions of time and residence in college, increased the number of scholars, and created an exhibition fund by pooling most of the old benefactions for the students. The presidency, from which the Rectory of Garsington had been detached in 1871, was also thrown open to laymen. But Mr. Wayte had retired at the age of 60 in 1878, and acting apparently on suggestions made by Dr. Jowett to certain of the fellows, a bare majority elected the Rev. John Percival, ex-scholar and fellow of Queen's College and headmaster of Clifton College.

Academic offices
| Preceded by John Wilson | President of Trinity College, Oxford; 1866–1878 | Succeeded by John Percival |
