= Thomas Sykes (academic) =

English academic

Thomas Sykes, DD (died 1705) was an English academic. He was born in Bagworth and educated at Trinity College, Oxford. He was Lady Margaret Professor of Divinity at Oxford from 1691 and President of Trinity from 1704, holding both posts until his death on 14 December 1705.

Academic offices
| Preceded by Henry Maurice | Lady Margaret Professor of Divinity; 1691–1705 | Succeeded by John Wynne |
| Preceded by Ralph Bathurst | President of Trinity College, Oxford; 1704–1705 | Succeeded by William Dobson |
