= William Dobson (academic) =

English academic

William Dobson, (30 March 1650 - 15 June 1731) was an English academic.

Dobson was born in Hampshire and educated at Trinity College, Oxford. He was President of Trinity from 1706 until his death. He also held the livings at Cliddesden, Farleigh and Garsington.

Academic offices
Preceded by Thomas Sykes	President of Trinity College, Oxford; 1706–1731	Succeeded by George Huddesford
