= Michael Beloff =

English barrister (born 1942)

The Honourable Michael Beloff KC
- Born: Michael Jacob Beloff; 18 April 1942 (age 84)
- Education: Magdalen College, Oxford
- Occupation: Human rights barrister
- Father: Max Beloff, Baron Beloff

Michael Jacob Beloff, KC (born 18 April 1942) is an English barrister, arbitrator and writer. A member of Blackstone Chambers, he practises in a number of areas including human rights, administrative law and sports law.

== Career ==
Beloff is the son of the historian Max Beloff, Baron Beloff, and is therefore technically styled 'the Honourable', a courtesy title he habitually uses. His mother was Helen Dobrin. He was educated at the Dragon School and Eton College (under scholarship), read history at Magdalen College, Oxford, and was President of the Oxford Union. When he was President of the Union in 1963 the Union passed a resolution to allow women to have full membership for the first time.

He was called to the Bar at Gray's Inn, where he later became a Bencher and was the Treasurer for 2008. He is the founder of a student prize at the Inn awarded for an essay on administrative law.

The term Plate glass university stems from the title of his book The Plateglass Universities (1970).

From 1995 until 2014 he was a member of the Jersey Court of Appeal and the Guernsey Court of Appeal and senior ordinary appeal Judge for six years. He sits on the Court of Arbitration for Sport (CAS), which deals with disputes including doping offences on behalf of the International Olympic Committee. He has also chaired the ethics commission of the International Association of Athletics Federations (IAAF), including investigations into IAAF treasurer Valentin Balakhnichev and Papa Massata Diack, son of IAAF president Lamine Diack.

He was President of Trinity College, Oxford, from 1996 to 2006, succeeded by Ivor Roberts. Trinity College now awards a Michael and Judith Beloff Scholarship. Trinity College's debating society also runs the annual Michael Beloff After-Dinner Speaking Competition, open to members of the college.

== Sources ==
- Brief CV, Oxford University Faculty of Law website
- Summary of Arbitration Panel adjudication, (accessed 3 July 2007)
- Blackstone Chambers Profile of Michael Beloff

== Arms ==
Coat of arms of Michael Beloff
Notes Displayed on a painted panel at Gray's Inn. Crest A griffin sejant Or holding in the dexter claw a fleur-de-lis Azure. Escutcheon Or between flaunches Sable each charged with a lily Argent three griffins’ heads erased Azure. Motto Verbis Delectando

Academic offices
Preceded by John Burgh	President of Trinity College, Oxford; 1996–2006	Succeeded by Ivor Roberts
