= List of civil parishes in Warwickshire =

Map of civil parishes in Warwickshire

This is a list of civil parishes in the ceremonial county of Warwickshire, England. There are 219 civil parishes.

Civil Parish	Civil Parish Population 2011	Area (km^{2}) 2011	Pre 1974 District	District
Admington			Stratford on Avon Rural District	Stratford-on-Avon
Alcester (town)	6,273	13.03	Alcester Rural District	Stratford-on-Avon
Alderminster	491	13.04	Stratford on Avon Rural District	Stratford-on-Avon
Ansley	2,207	11.14	Atherstone Rural District	North Warwickshire
Ansty	324	5.59	Rugby Rural District	Rugby
Arley	2,853	8.06	Rugby Rural District	North Warwickshire
Arrow with Weethley	226	13.07	Alcester Rural District	Stratford-on-Avon
Ashow	108	4.26	Warwick Rural District	Warwick
Astley	218	9.64	Rugby Rural District	North Warwickshire
Aston Cantlow	437	10.48	Alcester Rural District	Stratford-on-Avon
Atherstone on Stour			Stratford on Avon Rural District	Stratford-on-Avon
Atherstone (town)	8,670	4.16	Atherstone Rural District	North Warwickshire
Austrey	928	8.59	Atherstone Rural District	North Warwickshire
Avon Dassett	210	5.79	Southam Rural District	Stratford-on-Avon
Baddesley Clinton	182	5.52	Warwick Rural District	Warwick
Baddesley Ensor	1,980	4.66	Atherstone Rural District	North Warwickshire
Baginton	755	6.51	Warwick Rural District	Warwick
Barcheston	141	6.30	Shipston on Stour Rural District	Stratford-on-Avon
Barford	1,336	6.82	Warwick Rural District	Warwick
Barton-on-the-Heath			Shipston on Stour Rural District	Stratford-on-Avon
Baxterley	328	3.65	Atherstone Rural District	North Warwickshire
Bearley	724	4.04	Stratford on Avon Rural District	Stratford-on-Avon
Beaudesert	990	5.27	Stratford on Avon Rural District	Stratford-on-Avon
Beausale, Haseley, Honiley and Wroxall			Warwick Rural District	Warwick
Bentley	30,114	20.46	Atherstone Rural District	North Warwickshire
Bidford-on-Avon	5,350	13.48	Alcester Rural District	Stratford-on-Avon
Billesley			Stratford on Avon Rural District	Stratford-on-Avon
Binley Woods	2,665	2.93	Rugby Rural District	Rugby
Binton	311	5.25	Stratford on Avon Rural District	Stratford-on-Avon
Birdingbury	362	4.30	Rugby Rural District	Rugby
Bishop's Itchington	2,082	12.33	Southam Rural District	Stratford-on-Avon
Bishop's Tachbrook	2,558	14.45	Warwick Rural District	Warwick
Blackdown	129	1.55	Warwick Rural District	Warwick
Bourton and Draycote	275	8.17	Rugby Rural District	Rugby
Brailes	1,149	27.46	Shipston on Stour Rural District	Stratford-on-Avon
Brandon and Bretford	643	9.72	Rugby Rural District	Rugby
Brinklow	1,101	6.64	Rugby Rural District	Rugby
Bubbenhall	655	5.12	Warwick Rural District	Warwick
Budbrooke	1,863	9.04	Warwick Rural District	Warwick
Burmington	164	6.17	Shipston on Stour Rural District	Stratford-on-Avon
Burton Dassett	1,322	19.68	Southam Rural District	Stratford-on-Avon
Burton Green			Warwick Rural District	Warwick
Burton Hastings	226	11.65	Rugby Rural District	Rugby
Bushwood			Warwick Rural District	Warwick
Butlers Marston	232	7.18	Shipston on Stour Rural District	Stratford-on-Avon
Caldecote	142	2.58	Atherstone Rural District	North Warwickshire
Cawston	3,234	1.37	Rugby Rural District	Rugby
Chadshunt			Southam Rural District	Stratford-on-Avon
Chapel Ascote			Southam Rural District	Stratford-on-Avon
Charlecote	194	8.34	Stratford on Avon Rural District	Stratford-on-Avon
Cherington	214	3.54	Shipston on Stour Rural District	Stratford-on-Avon
Chesterton and Kingston	123	14.52	Southam Rural District	Stratford-on-Avon
Church Lawford	418	12.69	Rugby Rural District	Rugby
Churchover	251	6.53	Rugby Rural District	Rugby
Claverdon	1,261	11.15	Stratford on Avon Rural District	Stratford-on-Avon
Clifford Chambers and Milcote	432	6.97		Stratford-on-Avon
Clifton upon Dunsmore	1,304	10.81	Rugby Rural District	Rugby
Coleshill (town)	6,481	14.79	Meriden Rural District	North Warwickshire
Combe Fields	126	17.17	Rugby Rural District	Rugby
Combrook	159	4.63	Stratford on Avon Rural District	Stratford-on-Avon
Compton Verney	119	6.74	Stratford on Avon Rural District	Stratford-on-Avon
Compton Wynyates			Shipston on Stour Rural District	Stratford-on-Avon
Copston Magna			Rugby Rural District	Rugby
Corley	668	5.63	Meriden Rural District	North Warwickshire
Cosford			Rugby Rural District	Rugby
Coughton	157	8.12	Alcester Rural District	Stratford-on-Avon
Cubbington	3,929	8.54	Warwick Rural District	Warwick
Curdworth	1,115	5.88	Meriden Rural District	North Warwickshire
Dordon	3,215	8.70	Atherstone Rural District	North Warwickshire
Dorsington	150	4.61		Stratford-on-Avon
Dunchurch	2,938	13.21	Rugby Rural District	Rugby
Easenhall	291	4.39	Rugby Rural District	Rugby
Eathorpe	190	6.00	Warwick Rural District	Warwick
Ettington	1,171	14.69	Stratford on Avon Rural District	Stratford-on-Avon
Exhall	203	3.40	Alcester Rural District	Stratford-on-Avon
Farnborough	265	8.05	Southam Rural District	Stratford-on-Avon
Fenny Compton	808	8.73	Southam Rural District	Stratford-on-Avon
Fillongley	1,484	19.70	Meriden Rural District	North Warwickshire
Frankton	351	6.91	Rugby Rural District	Rugby
Fulbrook			Stratford on Avon Rural District	Stratford-on-Avon
Gaydon	446	12.20	Southam Rural District	Stratford-on-Avon
Grandborough	424	18.19	Rugby Rural District	Rugby
Great Alne	570	7.15	Alcester Rural District	Stratford-on-Avon
Great Packington	179	15.31	Meriden Rural District	North Warwickshire
Great Wolford	278	10.96	Shipston on Stour Rural District	Stratford-on-Avon
Grendon	1,502	9.17	Atherstone Rural District	North Warwickshire
Halford	341	3.86	Shipston on Stour Rural District	Stratford-on-Avon
Hampton Lucy	566	16.31	Stratford on Avon Rural District	Stratford-on-Avon
Harborough Magna	502	9.40	Rugby Rural District	Rugby
Harbury	2,420	13.73	Southam Rural District	Stratford-on-Avon
Hartshill	3,596	6.65	Atherstone Rural District	North Warwickshire
Haselor	220	12.66	Alcester Rural District	Stratford-on-Avon
Hatton	2,319	8.32	Warwick Rural District	Warwick
Henley-in-Arden	2,074	2.41	Stratford on Avon Rural District	Stratford-on-Avon
Hodnell and Wills Pastures			Southam Rural District	Stratford-on-Avon
Honington	250	15.73	Shipston on Stour Rural District	Stratford-on-Avon
Hunningham	180	5.10	Warwick Rural District	Warwick
Idlicote			Shipston on Stour Rural District	Stratford-on-Avon
Ilmington	712	13.44	Shipston on Stour Rural District	Stratford-on-Avon
Kenilworth (town)	22,413	18.70	Kenilworth Urban District	Warwick
Kineton	2,337	10.09	Stratford on Avon Rural District	Stratford-on-Avon
King's Newnham			Rugby Rural District	Rugby
Kingsbury	7,652	24.00	Atherstone Rural District	North Warwickshire
Kinwarton	1,082	1.90	Alcester Rural District	Stratford-on-Avon
Ladbroke	268	7.97	Southam Rural District	Stratford-on-Avon
Langley	162	4.17	Stratford on Avon Rural District	Stratford-on-Avon
Lapworth	1,828	18.71	Warwick Rural District	Warwick
Lea Marston	378	9.83	Meriden Rural District	North Warwickshire
Leamington Hastings	440	13.61	Rugby Rural District	Rugby
Leek Wootton and Guy's Cliffe	1,017	10.86	Warwick Rural District	Warwick
Lighthorne	361	6.28	Southam Rural District	Stratford-on-Avon
Little Compton	365	11.57	Shipston on Stour Rural District	Stratford-on-Avon
Little Lawford			Rugby Rural District	Rugby
Little Packington			Meriden Rural District	North Warwickshire
Little Wolford			Shipston on Stour Rural District	Stratford-on-Avon
Long Compton	764	15.39	Shipston on Stour Rural District	Stratford-on-Avon
Long Itchington	2,013	13.16	Southam Rural District	Stratford-on-Avon
Long Lawford	3,180	7.79	Rugby Rural District	Rugby
Long Marston	436	7.05	Stratford on Avon Rural District	Stratford-on-Avon
Loxley	399	6.45	Stratford on Avon Rural District	Stratford-on-Avon
Luddington	475	4.68	Stratford on Avon Rural District	Stratford-on-Avon
Mancetter	2,333	8.23	Atherstone Rural District	North Warwickshire
Mappleborough Green	857	20.38		Stratford-on-Avon
Marton	484	4.30	Rugby Rural District	Rugby
Maxstoke	240	11.53	Meriden Rural District	North Warwickshire
Merevale	181	11.55	Atherstone Rural District	North Warwickshire
Middleton	630	15.82	Meriden Rural District	North Warwickshire
Monks Kirby	445	18.41	Rugby Rural District	Rugby
Moreton Morrell	850	6.79	Stratford on Avon Rural District	Stratford-on-Avon
Morton Bagot			Alcester Rural District	Stratford-on-Avon
Napton on the Hill	1,144	24.97	Southam Rural District	Stratford-on-Avon
Nether Whitacre	947	10.16	Meriden Rural District	North Warwickshire
Newbold Pacey	267	7.49	Stratford on Avon Rural District	Stratford-on-Avon
Newton and Biggin	572	3.89	Rugby Rural District	Rugby
Newton Regis	599	9.12	Atherstone Rural District	North Warwickshire
Norton Lindsey	326	2.51	Warwick Rural District	Warwick
Offchurch	250	9.24	Warwick Rural District	Warwick
Old Milverton	319	2.97	Warwick Rural District	Warwick
Oldberrow			Alcester Rural District	Stratford-on-Avon
Over Whitacre	411	7.60	Meriden Rural District	North Warwickshire
Oxhill	305	7.46	Shipston on Stour Rural District	Stratford-on-Avon
Pailton	516	7.09	Warwick Rural District	Rugby
Pillerton Hersey	170	5.67	Shipston on Stour Rural District	Stratford-on-Avon
Pillerton Priors	294	6.28	Shipston on Stour Rural District	Stratford-on-Avon
Polesworth	8,423	16.62	Atherstone Rural District	North Warwickshire
Preston Bagot	127	5.25	Stratford on Avon Rural District	Stratford-on-Avon
Preston on Stour	244	11.57	Stratford on Avon Rural District	Stratford-on-Avon
Princethorpe	376	4.32	Rugby Rural District	Rugby
Priors Hardwick	172	6.22	Southam Rural District	Stratford-on-Avon
Priors Marston	579	14.45	Southam Rural District	Stratford-on-Avon
Quinton	1,968	18.37	Stratford on Avon Rural District	Stratford-on-Avon
Radbourn			Southam Rural District	Stratford-on-Avon
Radford Semele	2,012	8.59	Warwick Rural District	Warwick
Radway	238	5.91	Southam Rural District	Stratford-on-Avon
Ratley and Upton	327	6.98	Southam Rural District	Stratford-on-Avon
Rowington	944	17.40	Warwick Rural District	Warwick
Royal Leamington Spa (town)	49,491	13.18	Leamington Spa Municipal Borough	Warwick
Ryton-on-Dunsmore	1,813	9.20	Rugby Rural District	Rugby
Salford Priors	1,546	19.30	Alcester Rural District	Stratford-on-Avon
Sambourne	844	8.64	Alcester Rural District	Stratford-on-Avon
Seckington			Atherstone Rural District	North Warwickshire
Sherbourne	174	4.22	Warwick Rural District	Warwick
Shilton and Barnacle	875	8.03	Rugby Rural District	Rugby
Shipston on Stour (town)	5,038	4.93	Shipston on Stour Rural District	Stratford-on-Avon
Shotteswell	221	5.27		Stratford-on-Avon
Shrewley	870	5.12	Warwick Rural District	Warwick
Shustoke	549	8.52	Meriden Rural District	North Warwickshire
Shuttington	536	5.54	Atherstone Rural District	North Warwickshire
Snitterfield	1,226	15.81	Stratford on Avon Rural District	Stratford-on-Avon
Southam (town)	6,567	12.62	Southam Rural District	Stratford-on-Avon
Spernall			Alcester Rural District	Stratford-on-Avon
Stockton	1,347	5.61	Southam Rural District	Stratford-on-Avon
Stoneleigh	3,636	30.07	Warwick Rural District	Warwick
Stoneton			Southam Rural District	Stratford-on-Avon
Stourton	159	3.93	Shipston on Stour Rural District	Stratford-on-Avon
Stratford-upon-Avon (town)	28,222	38.28	Stratford upon Avon Municipal Borough	Stratford-on-Avon
Stretton Baskerville			Rugby Rural District	Rugby
Stretton-on-Dunsmore	1,159	7.76	Rugby Rural District	Rugby
Stretton-on-Fosse	439	8.43	Shipston on Stour Rural District	Stratford-on-Avon
Stretton-under-Fosse	234	4.55	Rugby Rural District	Rugby
Studley	5,879	8.62	Alcester Rural District	Stratford-on-Avon
Sutton-under-Brailes			Shipston on Stour Rural District	Stratford-on-Avon
Tanworth-in-Arden	3,104	34.09	Warwick Rural District	Stratford-on-Avon
Temple Grafton	462	8.30	Stratford on Avon Rural District	Stratford-on-Avon
Thurlaston	368	5.59	Rugby Rural District	Rugby
Tidmington			Shipston on Stour Rural District	Stratford-on-Avon
Tredington	1,422	21.62	Shipston on Stour Rural District	Stratford-on-Avon
Tysoe	1,143	23.65	Shipston on Stour Rural District	Stratford-on-Avon
Ufton	319	13.79	Southam Rural District	Stratford-on-Avon
Ullenhall	717	10.15	Stratford on Avon Rural District	Stratford-on-Avon
Upper and Lower Shuckburgh			Southam Rural District	Stratford-on-Avon
Upper Lighthorne	898	2.23		Stratford-on-Avon
Wappenbury			Warwick Rural District	Warwick
Warmington	304	7.32	Southam Rural District	Stratford-on-Avon
Warwick (town)			Warwick Municipal Borough	Warwick
Wasperton	153	6.65	Warwick Rural District	Warwick
Water Orton	3,444	2.52	Meriden Rural District	North Warwickshire
Watergall			Southam Rural District	Stratford-on-Avon
Welford-on-Avon	1,420	7.45	Stratford on Avon Rural District	Stratford-on-Avon
Wellesbourne and Walton	5,849	18.89	Stratford on Avon Rural District	Stratford-on-Avon
Weston under Wetherley	468	5.50	Warwick Rural District	Warwick
Weston-on-Avon	170	6.19		Stratford-on-Avon
Whatcote	143	3.54	Shipston on Stour Rural District	Stratford-on-Avon
Whichford	336	8.54	Shipston on Stour Rural District	Stratford-on-Avon
Whitchurch	174	8.04	Stratford on Avon Rural District	Stratford-on-Avon
Whitnash (town)	8,806	4.57	Warwick Rural District	Warwick
Wibtoft			Rugby Rural District	Rugby
Willey	155	6.32	Rugby Rural District	Rugby
Willoughby	398	7.11	Rugby Rural District	Rugby
Wilmcote	1,229	10.13		Stratford-on-Avon
Wishaw	125	4.88	Meriden Rural District	North Warwickshire
Withybrook	242	10.20	Rugby Rural District	Rugby
Wixford	155	2.44	Alcester Rural District	Stratford-on-Avon
Wolfhampcote	284	15.59	Rugby Rural District	Rugby
Wolston	2,564	11.35	Rugby Rural District	Rugby
Wolverton	212	4.77	Stratford on Avon Rural District	Stratford-on-Avon
Wolvey	1,942	23.17	Rugby Rural District	Rugby
Wootton Wawen	1,318	19.27	Stratford on Avon Rural District	Stratford-on-Avon
Wormleighton	183	24.98	Southam Rural District	Stratford-on-Avon

== See also ==
- List of civil parishes in England
