= List of places in Warwickshire =

Some of the larger settlements of Warwickshire.

This is a list of cities, towns and villages in the ceremonial county of Warwickshire, England.

== A ==
Admington, Alcester, Alderminster, Alveston, Ansley, Ansty, Arley, Armscote, Arrow, Ashorne, Ashow, Astley, Aston Cantlow, Atherstone, Atherstone-on-Stour, Austrey, Avon Dassett

== B ==
Baddesley Clinton, Baddesley Ensor, Baginton, Barcheston, Barford, Barnacle, Barton, Barton-on-the-Heath, Bascote, Baxterley, Bearley, Beaudesert, Beausale, Bentley, Bedworth, Berkswell, Bermuda, Bidford-on-Avon, Billesley, Bilton, Binley Woods, Binton, Birdingbury, Bishop's Itchington, Bishop's Tachbrook, Blackdown, Bolehall, Bourton-on-Dunsmore, Brailes, Bramcote, Bramcote Mains, Brandon, Bretford, Brinklow, Broadwell, Bubbenhall, Budbrooke, Bulkington, Burmington, Burton Dassett, Burton Hastings, Bushwood, Butlers Marston

== C ==
Caldecote, Cawston, Chadshunt, Chapel Ascote, Chapel Green, Charlecote, Cherington, Chesterton, Church Lawford, Churchover, Claverdon, Clifford Chambers, Clifton-upon-Dunsmore, Coleshill, Combrook, Compton Verney, Compton Wynyates, Copston Magna, Corley, Cosford, Coughton, Cubbington, Curdworth

== D ==
Darlingscott, Dordon, Dorsington, Draycote, Dunchurch

== E ==
Earlswood, Easenhall, Eathorpe, Ettington, Exhall, Exhall (Stratford upon Avon)

== F ==
Farnborough, Fenny Compton, Fillongley, Flecknoe, Frankton, Fulbrook

== G ==
Gaydon, Grandborough, Great Alne, Great Packington, Great Wolford, Grendon, Griff, Galley Common

== H ==
Halford, Hampton Lucy, Hampton Magna, Harborough Magna, Harbury, Hartshill, Haseley, Haseley Knob, Haselor, Hatton, Henley-in-Arden, Hill, Hill Wootton, Hodnell, Honiley, Honington, Houlton, Hunningham, Hunningham Hill, Hurley

== I ==
Idlicote, Ilmington

== K ==
Kenilworth, Keresley End, Kineton, Kingsbury, King's Coughton, King's Newnham, Kinwarton, Kites Hardwick

== L ==
Ladbroke, Langley, Lapworth, Lea Marston, Leamington Hastings, Leamington Spa, Leek Wootton, Lighthorne, Lighthorne Heath, Little Alne, Little Compton, Little Lawford, Little Packington, Little Wolford, Long Compton, Long Itchington, Long Lawford, Long Marston, Lower Quinton, Lower Shuckburgh, Lower Tysoe, Lowsonford, Loxley, Luddington, Lye Green

== M ==
Mancetter, Marlcliff, Marton, Maxstoke, Merevale, Middleton, Milcote, Milverton, Monks Kirby, Morton Bagot, Moreton Morrell, Moxhull

== N ==
Napton-on-the-Hill, Nether Whitacre, Newbold-on-Avon, Newbold Pacey, Newnham, Newton, Newton Regis, No Man's Heath, Northend, Norton Lindsey, Nuneaton

== O ==
Offchurch, Oldberrow, Old Milverton, Over Whitacre, Oxhill

== P ==
Pailton, Pathlow, Piccadilly, Pillerton Hersey, Pillerton Priors, Pinley Green, Polesworth, Preston Bagot, Preston-on-Stour, Princethorpe, Priors Hardwick, Priors Marston

== Q ==
Quinton

== R ==
Radbourne, Radford Semele, Radway, Ratley, Rowington, Rugby, Ryton-on-Dunsmore

== S ==
Salford Priors, Sambourne, Sawbridge, Seckington, Sherbourne, Shilton, Shipston-on-Stour, Shotteswell, Shottery, Shrewley, Shustoke, Shuttington, Snitterfield, Southam, Spernall, Stareton, Stockton, Stoneleigh, Stoneton, Stourton, Stratford-upon-Avon, Stretton Baskerville, Stretton-on-Dunsmore, Stretton-on-Fosse, Stretton-under-Fosse, Studley, Sutton-under-Brailes

== T ==
Tanworth-in-Arden, Temple Grafton, Temple Herdewyke, Thurlaston, Tiddington, Tidmington, Tredington, Tysoe

== U ==
Ufton, Ullenhall, Upper Quinton, Upper Shuckburgh

== W ==
Walcote, Wappenbury, Warmington, Warwick, Wasperton, Watergall, Water Orton, Weethley, Welford-on-Avon, Wellesbourne, Weston-on-Avon, Weston-under-Wetherley, Whatcote, Whichford, Whitchurch, Whitnash, Wibtoft, Willey, Willoughby, Wilmcote, Winderton, Wishaw, Withybrook, Wixford, Wolfhampcote, Wolston, Wolverton, Wolvey, Wood End (Atherstone), Wood End (Fillongley), Wood End (Stratford-on-Avon), Woolscott, Wootton Wawen, Wormleighton, Wroxall

== See also ==
- List of Warwickshire towns by population
- List of places in England
