= North Warwickshire (unitary authority area) =

- Future unitary authority area
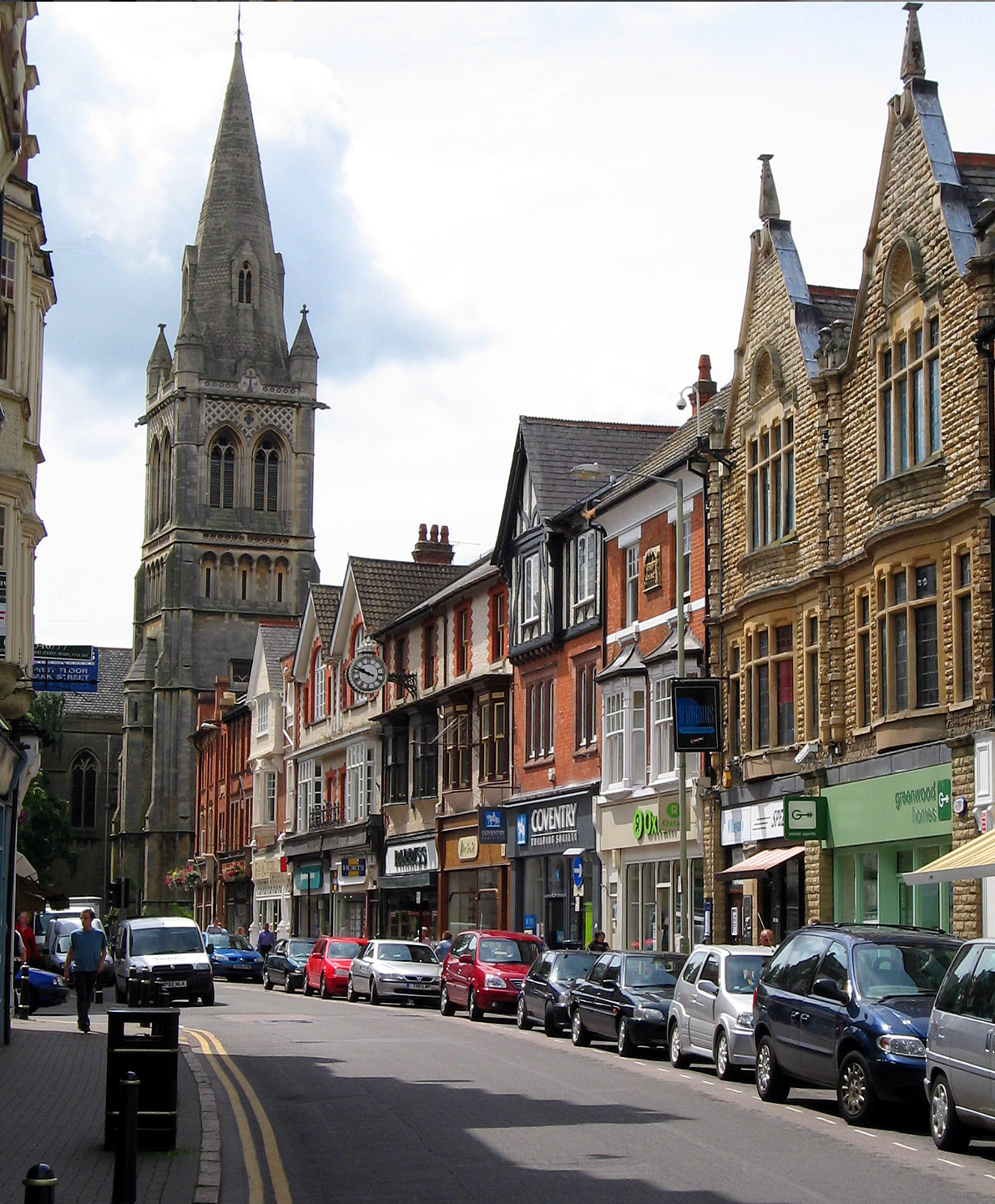
- Regent Street, Rugby, the area's second largest town

- Interactive map
- Coordinates: 52.3754°N 1.2639°W
- Sovereign state: United Kingdom
- Country: England
- Region: West Midlands
- Ceremonial county: Warwickshire

Government
  - Type: Unitary authority
  - Body: North Warwickshire Council
  - MPs: Jodie Gosling (L); Rachel Taylor (L); John Slinger (L); Jeremy Wright (C)

Area
  - Total: 275.84 sq mi (714.41 km^{2})

Population (2024 estimate)
  - Total: 323,000
- Time zone: UTC+0 (GMT)
  - Summer (DST): UTC+1 (BST)

North Warwickshire is expected to be a unitary authority area in the ceremonial county of Warwickshire, England. It was planned to be formed on 1 April 2028 and elections to the new authority were planned to take place in May 2027. Plans to create it were halted in September 2026 and the first election was cancelled. In October 2026, it was announced that the first election is expected to take place in 2028 and the unitary authority will be established in 2029.

== Formation ==
It will be formed as part of the upcoming local government reforms from the existing Warwickshire districts of North Warwickshire, Nuneaton and Bedworth and Rugby. A new South Warwickshire unitary will cover the other two Warwickshire districts of Warwick and Stratford-on-Avon.

The proposal for two unitary councils was supported by all the district councils in Warwickshire apart from Rugby Borough Council. The alternative proposal for a single unitary, which was backed by Warwickshire County Council and Rugby Borough Council was not accepted.

Decisions were announced in July 2026, with elections planned for May 2027 and the new authorities established in 2028. In September 2026, the Warwickshire proposals were halted by the government and placed under review. The 2027 election was cancelled. In October 2026, the plans were revived with the first election expected to take place in 2028 and the unitary authority established in 2029, subject to a three week consultation period. Warwickshire is one of only three areas where the proposals were not met with threat of judicial review.

== Governance ==
The area will be run by North Warwickshire Council, which will comprise 61 councillors.

== Geography ==
Its largest settlement will be Nuneaton and it will also include the towns of Rugby, Bedworth, Atherstone and Coleshill, as well as the large villages of Polesworth, Kingsbury and Bulkington. The area has a 2024 estimated population of 323,000.

== Parishes ==
Most of the area will be covered by civil parishes, of which there are currently 74. The parish councils for Atherstone and Coleshill have declared their parishes to be towns, allowing them to take the style "town council". Some of the parishes share a grouped parish council. The parishes are:

- Ansley, Ansty, Astley, Atherstone, Austrey
- Baddesley Ensor, Baxterley, Bentley, Binley Woods, Birdingbury, Bourton and Draycote, Brandon and Bretford, Brinklow, Burton Hastings
- Caldecote, Cawston, Church Lawford, Churchover, Clifton-upon-Dunsmore, Coleshill, Combe Fields, Copston Magna, Corley, Cosford, Curdworth
- Dordon, Dunchurch
- Easenhall
- Fillongley, Frankton
- Grandborough, Great Packington, Grendon
- Harborough Magna, Hartshill
- King's Newnham, Kingsbury
- Lea Marston, Leamington Hastings, Little Lawford, Little Packington, Long Lawford
- Mancetter, Marton, Maxstoke, Merevale, Middleton, Monks Kirby
- Nether Whitacre, Newton and Biggin, Newton Regis
- Over Whitacre
- Pailton, Polesworth, Princethorpe
- Ryton-on-Dunsmore
- Seckington, Shilton and Barnacle, Shustoke, Shuttington, Stretton Baskerville, Stretton-on-Dunsmore, Stretton-under-Fosse
- Thurlaston,
- Water Orton, Wibtoft, Willey, Willoughby, Wishaw, Withybrook, Wolfhampcote, Wolston, Wolvey.

=== Unparished areas ===
Unparished areas in the area currently include:

- Bedworth (including Bulkington)
- Nuneaton
- Rugby (a consultation is underway for the creation of a town council for Rugby.)

== See also ==
- South Warwickshire (district)
