= Rugby Rural District =

Former rural district in Warwickshire, England

Coordinates: 52.39°N 1.35°W

Rugby RD
- History
  - Created: 1894
  - Abolished: 1974
  - Succeeded by: Borough of Rugby
- Status: Rural district
  - HQ: Rugby

The Rugby Rural District was a former rural district in Warwickshire, England. The district covered the rural areas surrounding the town of Rugby, where the district council was based, but did not include Rugby itself which was administered separately.

The district was created in 1894. In 1932 its boundaries were significantly altered. The district was expanded to include the whole of the abolished Monks Kirby Rural District, parts of the abolished Foleshill Rural District and parts of the abolished Nuneaton Rural District. It also briefly included Bulkington, but in 1938 this merged with the Bedworth Urban District. At the same time it lost some territory as Rugby's town boundaries were expanded.

In 1953, the rural district was the second largest local authority area in Warwickshire, covering 80,000 acres (320 km^{2}) (approximately the size of the Isle of Wight). The population of the Rural District in mid-1952 was reported as 21,220, living in around 5,000 houses.

On 1 April 1974 the district was abolished and merged with the Rugby municipal borough (which covered the town of Rugby) to form the present Borough of Rugby.

== Parishes ==
At the time of its abolition in 1974 Rugby RD consisted of the following civil parishes:

- Ansty
- Binley Woods
- Birdingbury
- Bourton and Draycote
- Brandon and Bretford
- Brinklow
- Burton Hastings
- Church Lawford
- Churchover
- Clifton upon Dunsmore
- Combe Fields
- Copston Magna
- Cosford
- Dunchurch
- Easenhall
- Frankton
- Grandborough
- Harborough Magna
- King's Newnham (Newnham Regis)
- Leamington Hastings
- Little Lawford
- Long Lawford
- Marton
- Monks Kirby
- Newton and Biggin
- Pailton
- Princethorpe
- Ryton on Dunsmore
- Shilton
- Stretton Baskerville
- Stretton-on-Dunsmore
- Stretton-under-Fosse
- Thurlaston
- Wibtoft
- Willey
- Willoughby
- Withybrook
- Wolfhampcote
- Wolston
- Wolvey
