= Southam Rural District =

Rural district in Warwickshire, England

Coordinates: 52.25°N 1.40°W

Southam
- History
  - Created: 1894
  - Abolished: 1974
  - Succeeded by: Stratford-on-Avon District
- Status: Rural district
  - HQ: Southam

Southam Rural District was a rural district in the county of Warwickshire, England. It was created in 1894 and consisted of 26 parishes, a further six parishes were added in 1932, when the Farnborough Rural District was disbanded. It was named after and administered from Southam.

Since 1 April 1974 it has formed part of the District of Stratford-on-Avon.

At the time of its dissolution it consisted of the following 32 civil parishes.

- Avon Dassett
- Bishops Itchington
- Burton Dassett
- Chadshunt
- Chapel Ascote
- Chesterton
- Farnborough
- Fenny Compton
- Gaydon
- Harbury
- Hodnell
- Ladbroke
- Lighthorne
- Long Itchington
- Napton-on-the-Hill
- Priors Hardwick
- Priors Marston
- Radway
- Ratley and Upton
- Shotteswell
- Southam
- Stockton
- Stoneton
- Ufton
- Upper and Lower Radbourne
- Upper and Lower Shuckburgh
- Warmington
- Watergall
- Wills Pastures
- Wormleighton
