= Foleshill Rural District =

Former local government area in the UK

Foleshill RD
- History
  - Created: 1894
  - Abolished: 1932
  - Succeeded by: Various
- Status: Rural district
  - HQ: Foleshill

The Foleshill Rural District was a former rural district in Warwickshire, England. The district covered the rural areas surrounding the village of Foleshill, which is now a suburb of Coventry.

The district was created in 1894 under the Local Government Act 1894. It lost territory in 1928, when Bedworth was established as a separate urban district, and it also lost the parishes of Stoke and Stoke Heath to the County Borough of Coventry. In 1932 the entire district was abolished and its territory divided between Bedworth, Coventry, the Meriden Rural District, the Rugby Rural District and the Warwick Rural District.

== Parishes ==
At various times Foleshill RD consisted of the following civil parishes:

- Ansty
- Bedworth (until 1928)
- Binley Woods
- Exhall
- Foleshill
- Keresley
- Shilton
- Stoke & Stoke Heath (until 1928)
- Walsgrave on Sowe
- Willenhall
- Withybrook
- Wyken
