= Newbold Revel =

Country house in Warwickshire, England

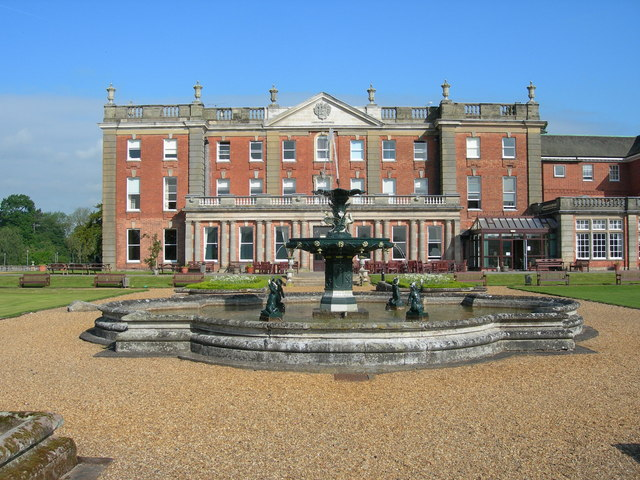
- Interactive map of Newbold Revel
- 52.4234°N 1.3320°W
- Location: Stretton-under-Fosse, Warwickshire, England

Listed Building – Grade II*
- Official name: Newbold Revel
- Designated: 4 December 1951
- Reference no.: 1233638

Newbold Revel refers to an existing 18th-century country house and a historic manorial estate in North East Warwickshire. In the fifteenth century, the estate was the home of the medieval author Sir Thomas Malory. The house is today used by HM Prison Service as a training college; it is a Grade II* listed building.

Historically, the Newbold Revel estate and house formed a significant part of the parish of Monks Kirby. Today the country house is in the modern parish of Stretton-under-Fosse, in the borough of Rugby.

The current house was built in 1716 for Sir Fulwar Skipwith, 2nd Baronet and was constructed of brick in three stories to an H-shaped plan with an 11-bay frontage. In the late 19th century the ground floor was extended forwards.

== History ==
The estate dates from Anglo-Saxon times and is first mentioned in the 1086 Domesday Book as Feniniwebold or Fenny Newbold: Bold is an anglo-saxon term for house so the name means a new house or building. "Fenny" - which denoted marshy land - distinguished the estate from the numerous other Warwickshire settlements called Newbold, notably the nearby Newbold on Avon. The name Newbold (juxta) Stretton occurs in the 13th and 14th centuries. From the early 16th century the manor began to be known as Newnham Revell after the family that owned it (see below).

The manor was acquired by the Revel family around 1235. It descended to Sir John Revel, MP and on his death with no son passed to his daughter Alice, who had married Esquire John Malory of Winwick, Northamptonshire. Their son was Sir Thomas Malory, probable author of Le Morte d'Arthur and MP for Warwickshire from 1443 to circa 1446. His great-grandson Nicholas sold the property, after which it passed through a succession of private hands, including those of the builder of the present house, Sir Fulwar Skipwith.

The estate was purchased in 1863 by Edward Wood and descended to his grandson before being acquired in 1898 by Colonel Heath, a Staffordshire brick manufacturer, and in 1911 by the banker and philanthropist, Leo Bernard William Bonn, who founded and endowed (1911) what became the RNID. After Bonn's death, in 1929, the property was inherited by his only son, Major Walter Basil Louis Bonn. Major Walter Bonn sold Newbold Revel and its estate, in 1931, to the Seventh-day Adventists for use as a missionary training college but it was requisitioned in 1942 for use as an agent training establishment during World War II. It was an RAF Y-station Secret Intelligence Service and German telephony communications base. After the war it was purchased by the Sisters of Charity of St. Paul as a Catholic teacher training college, and sold in 1978 to British Telecom.

In 1985 it was taken over by the Prison Service for its current use as the Prison Service College.
