= Hungerfield =

Hamlet in Easenhall, Rugby

Coordinates: 52.40586°N 1.33646°W

Hungerfield is a hamlet in the parish of Easenhall in the borough of Rugby in the County of Warwickshire in England.

Hungerfield is a small collection of four houses roughly located around bridge 35 of the North Oxford Canal in Easenhall. It is believed that the place gets its name from the clay soil it inhabits.

There is no record of Hungerfield's existence as a place prior to the Enclosure of the 1700s; it is believed to have been created as part of the enclosure of Easenhall undertaken by the Skipwith family. There is no record of when this was carried out but evidence from a number of sources suggest sometime around 1760. Prior to this the area had operated the Open-field system of which evidence remains. Many of the surrounding fields have much of the traditional ridge and furrow pattern surviving under the current pasture.

The first written record of Hungerfield as a place comes from a survey by the Oxford Canal Company in 1829. The company commissioned the survey to show land ownership for the company's canal shortening programme.
