= 2026 Rugby Borough Council election =

2026 English local government election

- 7 May 2026

15 out of 42 seats to Rugby Borough Council (including 1 by-election) 22 seats needed for a majority
	First party	Second party
Leader	Derek Poole	Jerry Roodhouse
Party	Conservative	Liberal Democrats
Last election	17 seats, 32.0%	10 seats, 20.7%
Seats before	17	10
Seats won	4	6
Seats after	15	12
Seat change	▼2	▲2
Popular vote	9,417	7,375
Percentage	25.7%	20.1%
Swing	▼6.3%	▼0.6%
	Third party	Fourth party
Leader	Michael Moran (retiring)	None
Party	Labour	Reform
Last election	15 seats, 36.2%	0 seats, 4.1%
Seats before	15	0
Seats won	2	3
Seats after	12	3
Seat change	▼3	▲3
Popular vote	5,444	10,375
Percentage	14.9%	28.3%
Swing	▼21.3%	▲24.2%
- Winner of each seat at the 2026 Rugby Borough Council election.
Leader before election
Michael Moran
Labour
No overall control (Note: Labour minority.)
Leader after election
Louise Robinson
Labour
No overall control (Note: Labour–Liberal Democrat coalition.)

The 2026 Rugby Borough Council election was held on 7 May 2026, alongside the other local elections across the United Kingdom being held on the same day, to elect 14 of 42 members of Rugby Borough Council in Warwickshire, England.

Prior to the election, the council was under no overall control. The Conservatives were the largest party, but the council was being run by a Labour minority administration with informal support from the Liberal Democrats.

The council remained under no overall control at this election. The Conservatives lost seats but remained the largest party. The Liberal Democrats made net gains, winning six of the fifteen seats being contested at this election, whilst Labour lost seats, leaving Labour and the Liberal Democrats each with twelve seats. Reform UK also won three seats, having not held any seats prior to the election. The incumbent Labour leader of the council, Michael Moran, did not stand for re-election. After the election, Labour chose Louise Robinson to be its new group leader. Labour and the Liberal Democrats subsequently formed a coalition to run the council, led by the new Labour group leader Louise Robinson. She was formally confirmed as the new leader of the council at the subsequent annual council meeting on 21 May 2026.

== Summary ==
=== Background ===
In 2024, the council remained under no overall control but Labour overtook the Conservatives as the largest party. In January 2026, the council asked for the election to be postponed pending local government reorganisation. However it was rescheduled on 16 February 2026.

=== Election result ===
2026 Rugby Borough Council election
Party	This election				Full council			This election		
Party	Candidates	Seats	Net	Seats %	Other	Total	Total %	Votes	Votes %	+/−
Conservative	{{{candidates}}}	4	▼2	26.7	11	15	35.7	9,417	25.7	–6.3
Liberal Democrats	{{{candidates}}}	6	▲2	40.0	6	12	28.6	7,375	20.1	–0.6
Labour	{{{candidates}}}	2	▼3	13.3	10	12	28.6	5,444	14.9	–21.3
Reform	{{{candidates}}}	3	▲3	20.0	0	3	7.1	10,375	28.3	+24.2
Green	{{{candidates}}}	0	Steady	0.0	0	0	0.0	4,044	11.0	+4.1

== Incumbents ==
Ward	Incumbent councillor	Party	Re-standing
Admirals & Cawston	Michael Moran	Labour	No
Benn	Richard Harrington	Labour	Yes
Bilton	Toby Lawrence	Conservative	Yes
Coton & Boughton	Alison Livesey	Labour	Yes
Dunsmore	Jon Bennett	Liberal Democrats	No
Eastlands	Sam Edwards	Liberal Democrats	Yes
Hillmorton	Ian Picker	Conservative	No
New Bilton	Angela Thompson	Labour	Yes
Newbold & Brownsover	Ramesh Srivastava	Labour	No
Paddox	Noreen New	Liberal Democrats	Yes
Revel & Binley Woods	Belinda Garcia	Conservative	Yes
Rokeby & Overslade	Bill Lewis	Liberal Democrats	No
Wolston & The Lawfords	Simon Ward	Conservative	Yes
Wolvey & Shilton	Becky Maoudis	Conservative	No

== Ward results ==
=== Admirals & Cawston ===
Admirals & Cawston
Party	Candidate	Votes	%	±%
Reform	Andrew Glowacki	856	30.0	+18.9
Conservative	Robert Jerams	673	23.6	–2.8
Labour	Chris Lee	542	19.0	–28.6
Liberal Democrats	Lee Chase	484	17.0	+7.9
Green	Frank Green	298	10.4	+4.6
Majority		183	6.4	N/A
Turnout		2,865	41.6	+8.8
Registered electors		6,888		
Reform gain from Labour		Swing	▲8.9	

=== Benn ===
Benn
Party	Candidate	Votes	%	±%
Labour	Richard Harrington*	786	40.2	–24.5
Green	Angela Dunne	398	20.4	+8.8
Reform	Les Northey	391	20.0	N/A
Conservative	Sarah Downes	257	13.1	–3.2
Liberal Democrats	Rebecca Moran	123	6.3	–1.2
Majority		388	19.8	–28.6
Turnout		1,963	31.8	+5.7
Registered electors		6,172		
Labour hold		Swing	▼16.7	

=== Bilton ===
Bilton (2 seats due to by-election)
Party	Candidate	Votes	%	±%
Liberal Democrats	Stephen Pimm	811	31.1	+0.3
Liberal Democrats	Nicky Bainbridge	802	30.8	±0.0
Reform	John Partridge	701	26.9	N/A
Reform	Gareth Keeley	677	26.0	N/A
Conservative	Toby Lawrence*	621	23.8	–13.5
Conservative	Dapo Awotunde	540	20.7	–16.7
Green	Phil Bates	242	9.3	+4.2
Labour	Robert Bevin	223	8.6	–15.6
Labour	Philip Burns	209	8.0	–16.2
Green	Harriet Hart	204	7.8	+2.7
Turnout		2,605	52.0	+9.0
Registered electors		5,009		
Liberal Democrats gain from Conservative				
Liberal Democrats gain from Conservative				

=== Coton & Boughton ===
Coton & Boughton
Party	Candidate	Votes	%	±%
Reform	Jamie Pullin	733	30.6	+22.0
Labour	Alison Livesey*	584	24.3	–24.0
Conservative	Karolina Lipowska	567	23.6	–7.9
Green	Rowan Wooding	314	13.1	+7.7
Liberal Democrats	Kay Taylor	201	8.4	+2.1
Majority		149	6.3	N/A
Turnout		2,404	40.5	+6.8
Registered electors		5,930		
Reform gain from Labour		Swing	▲23.0	

=== Dunsmore ===
Dunsmore
Party	Candidate	Votes	%	±%
Liberal Democrats	Umesh Mistry	1,147	30.3	–7.4
Reform	Tom Costello	1,108	29.3	N/A
Conservative	Claude Hogea	954	25.2	–13.3
Green	Helen Ford	314	8.3	+1.4
Labour	Elly Brown	264	7.0	–10.0
Majority		39	1.0	N/A
Turnout		3,797	49.4	+14.3
Registered electors		7,693		
Liberal Democrats hold				

=== Eastlands ===
Eastlands
Party	Candidate	Votes	%	±%
Liberal Democrats	Sam Edwards*	930	39.3	+3.0
Reform	Francis Holden	604	25.5	+17.9
Green	Rachel Granger	312	13.2	+6.7
Conservative	Carolyn Watson-Merret	262	11.1	–8.1
Labour	Adewale Adewumi	260	11.0	–19.5
Majority		326	13.8	+8.0
Turnout		2,371	40.5	+7.0
Registered electors		5,823		
Liberal Democrats hold		Swing	▼7.5	

=== Hillmorton ===
Hillmorton
Party	Candidate	Votes	%	±%
Conservative	Devenne Kedward	1,120	38.0	–5.8
Reform	Liam Taverner	825	28.0	N/A
Labour	Vanya Yankova	382	13.0	–28.8
Green	Alexander Linden	334	11.3	+6.5
Liberal Democrats	Julie Douglas	283	9.6	+0.1
Majority		295	10.0	+8.0
Turnout		2,949	39.9	+7.8
Registered electors		7,400		
Conservative hold				

=== New Bilton ===
New Bilton
Party	Candidate	Votes	%	±%
Labour	Angela Thompson*	571	34.8	–27.0
Reform	Anne-Marie Sonko	495	30.2	N/A
Conservative	Andrew Bearne	254	15.5	–7.7
Green	Roy Sandison	226	13.8	+5.2
Liberal Democrats	James Moran	94	5.7	–0.7
Majority		76	4.6	–34.0
Turnout		1,645	30.8	+7.2
Registered electors		5,345		
Labour hold				

=== Newbold & Brownsover ===
Newbold & Brownsover
Party	Candidate	Votes	%	±%
Reform	Kyle Stewart	644	30.3	+20.5
Conservative	Wayne Rabin	565	26.6	–3.6
Labour	Alan Pavis	521	24.5	–23.4
Green	Julian Cresswell	283	13.3	+5.9
Liberal Democrats	Victoria Saxby-Edwards	114	5.4	+0.7
Majority		79	3.7	N/A
Turnout		2,135	34.2	+8.2
Registered electors		6,251		
Reform gain from Labour		Swing	▲12.1	

=== Paddox ===
Paddox
Party	Candidate	Votes	%	±%
Liberal Democrats	Noreen New*	1,045	40.7	–5.8
Reform	Coreena Glover	635	24.7	+17.5
Conservative	Joel Baldwin	392	15.3	–0.4
Green	Bob Beggs	264	10.3	+5.8
Labour	Mark Gore	233	9.1	–16.9
Majority		410	16.0	–4.5
Turnout		2,574	46.2	+8.5
Registered electors		5,571		
Liberal Democrats hold		Swing	▼11.7	

=== Revel & Binley Woods ===
Revel & Binley Woods
Party	Candidate	Votes	%	±%
Conservative	Belinda Garcia*	1,072	39.2	–22.2
Reform	Pat Ruck	983	35.9	N/A
Labour	Sarah Feeney	323	11.8	–17.1
Green	Maralyn Pickup	236	8.6	+2.7
Liberal Democrats	Sean Hannigan	124	4.5	+0.7
Majority		89	3.3	–29.2
Turnout		2,746	52.9	+16.2
Registered electors		5,187		
Conservative hold				

=== Rokeby & Overslade ===
Rokeby & Overslade
Party	Candidate	Votes	%	±%
Liberal Democrats	Corissa Davis	1,061	44.0	–15.8
Reform	Dan Glover	682	28.3	N/A
Conservative	Heidi Thomas	270	11.2	–7.1
Green	Kirsty Denyer	212	8.8	+3.3
Labour	Ara Anbarasu	184	7.6	–8.9
Majority		379	15.7	–25.8
Turnout		2,413	42.5	+6.9
Registered electors		5,672		
Liberal Democrats hold				

=== Wolston & The Lawfords ===
Wolston & The Lawfords
Party	Candidate	Votes	%	±%
Conservative	Simon Ward*	1,333	48.6	+8.1
Reform	Sat Bhamra	692	25.2	+15.2
Green	Becca Stevenson	319	11.6	+2.0
Labour	Adam Wright	276	10.1	–26.0
Liberal Democrats	Wayne Broad	125	4.6	+0.9
Majority		641	23.4	+19.0
Turnout		2,749	44.0	+10.5
Registered electors		6,246		
Conservative hold		Swing	▼3.6	

=== Wolvey & Shilton ===
Wolvey & Shilton
Party	Candidate	Votes	%	±%
Conservative	JP Downes	537	49.2	–25.6
Reform	Aidan O'Brien	349	32.0	N/A
Green	Liam Newsome	88	8.1	N/A
Labour	Deborah Leedham	86	7.9	–17.3
Liberal Democrats	Hossain Tafazzal	31	2.8	N/A
Majority		188	17.2	–32.4
Turnout		1,093	53.0	+15.0
Registered electors		2,063		
Conservative hold				
