= List of settlements in Warwickshire by population =

The 20 largest settlements of Warwickshire. District centres in yellow and its county town in bold.

This is a guide to the size of settlements in Warwickshire based on the data from the article on each town which in turn are taken from the 2001, 2011 and 2021 UK censuses. The population of Warwickshire in 2021 was officially estimated to be 596,773.

Rank	Settlement	Borough/district	Population		
Rank	Settlement	Borough/district	2021	2011	2001
1	Nuneaton	Nuneaton and Bedworth	88,813	86,552	83,070
2	Rugby	Rugby	78,125	70,628	62,580
3	Royal Leamington Spa	Warwick	57,512	55,733	51,650
4	Warwick	Warwick	37,267	31,345	26,030
5	Bedworth	Nuneaton and Bedworth	31,332	30,648	29,180
6	Stratford-upon-Avon	Stratford-on-Avon	30,055	27,830	22,120
7	Kenilworth	Warwick	22,538	22,413	22,218
8	Atherstone	North Warwickshire	11,259	10,573	10,338
9	Polesworth	North Warwickshire	9,913	9,645	9,657
10	Whitnash	Warwick	8,193	8,094	7,430
11	Southam	Stratford-on-Avon	8,114	6,567	6,509
12	Kingsbury	North Warwickshire	7,562	7,652	7,420
13	Wellesbourne	Stratford-on-Avon	7,283	7,652	5,876
14	Alcester	Stratford-on-Avon	7,011	6,939	7,068
15	Coleshill	North Warwickshire	6,744	6,341	6,235
16	Studley	Stratford-on-Avon	6,331	6,203	6,257
17	Bulkington	Nuneaton and Bedworth	6,076	6,146	6,303
18	Shipston-on-Stour	Stratford-on-Avon	5,849	5,083	4,460
19	Bidford-on-Avon	Stratford-on-Avon	5,821	4,497	3,978
20	Long Lawford	Rugby	4,367	3,007	2,686

== See also ==
- Coventry
