= Compton Wynyates (parish) =

Parish in Warwickshire, England

Coordinates: 52.083°N 1.529°W

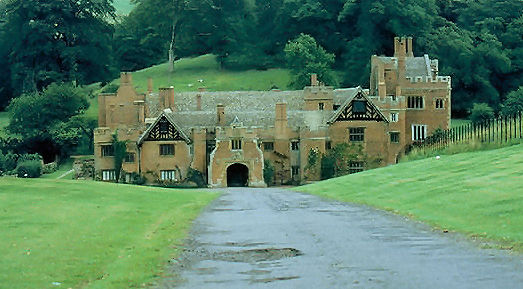
- Compton Wynyates house

- Location within Warwickshire
- Civil parish: Compton Wynyates
- District: Stratford-on-Avon
- Shire county: Warwickshire
- Region: West Midlands
- Country: England
- Sovereign state: United Kingdom
- Post town: WARWICK
- Postcode district: CV35
- Dialling code: 01295

Compton Wynyates or Compton Wyniates is an ancient parish and civil parish in Stratford-on-Avon District, Warwickshire, England. It includes the house and grounds of Compton Wynyates, and extends to the north-east and south-west of the house, with a size of roughly 3.5 by 0.5 miles (6 km × 0.8 km). The parish has an area of 1,038 acres (420 ha). Compton Wynyates was also a village; the earthworks of the village partly survive. It does not have a parish council but has a parish meeting. Population figures for the 2011 census are not available for this parish. Population figures from 1801 to 1961 ranged between 15 and 48, with a figure of 23 in 1961. The civil parish was within Brailes Rural District from 1894 to 1931 and within Shipston-on-Stour Rural District from 1931 to 1974.

== History ==
The name "Compton" means valley farm/settlement', and the "Wyniates" part means 'windy pass'.
