= Warwick Rural District =

Historical rural district

Coordinates: 52.30°N 1.59°W

Warwick Rural District was a rural district of Warwickshire, England. It was created in 1894, and covered an area around, but not including, Warwick. It expanded in 1932 with the abolition of Foleshill Rural District and Solihull Rural District.

The district was abolished in 1974 under the Local Government Act 1972, merging with Warwick, Leamington Spa, and Kenilworth to form the modern non-metropolitan district of Warwick.
