= Ashow =

Village in Warwickshire, England

Coordinates: 52.32°N 01.54°W

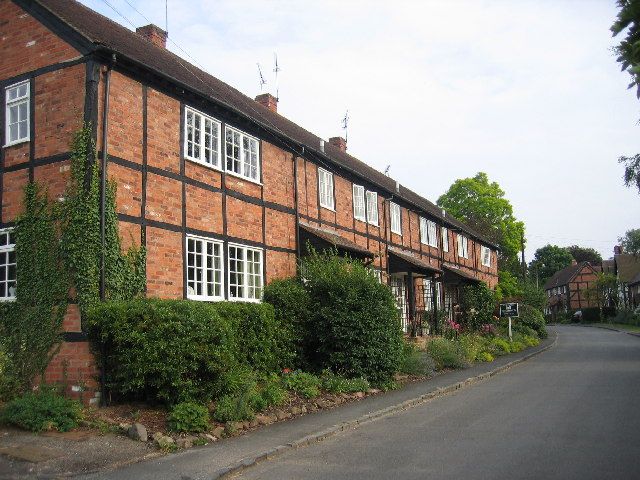
- Ashow village

- Location within Warwickshire
- Population: 108 (2011)
- OS grid reference: SP3170
- Shire county: Warwickshire
- Region: West Midlands
- Country: England
- Sovereign state: United Kingdom
- Post town: Kenilworth
- Postcode district: CV8
- Police: Warwickshire
- Fire: Warwickshire
- Ambulance: West Midlands

Ashow is a small village and civil parish in the Warwick district of Warwickshire, England, about 2.5 miles (4 km) south-east of central Kenilworth. According to the 2001 census the parish had a population of 104, increasing slightly to 108 at the 2011 Census. The village has avoided the typical expansion of most British settlements which took place in the twentieth century. Ashow has around 51 houses and a small church, The Assumption of Our Lady, which dates from the early 12th century and has a graveyard. The village has no forms of industry or employment, although Ashow and the neighbouring hamlet of Bericote (depopulated since 1540) formerly had three mills. The village is accessible by the B4115 Coventry Road (just off the A46/A452 roundabout), and the southernmost tip of the parish lies on the River Avon. The village is quite flat, at an altitude of 60–80 metres (200–260 feet). The earliest-known documented reference to Ashow (or "Asceshot") is in the Domesday Book of 1086.
