= Borough of Rugby =

Coordinates: 52.3752°N 1.2637°W

- Borough and non-metropolitan district
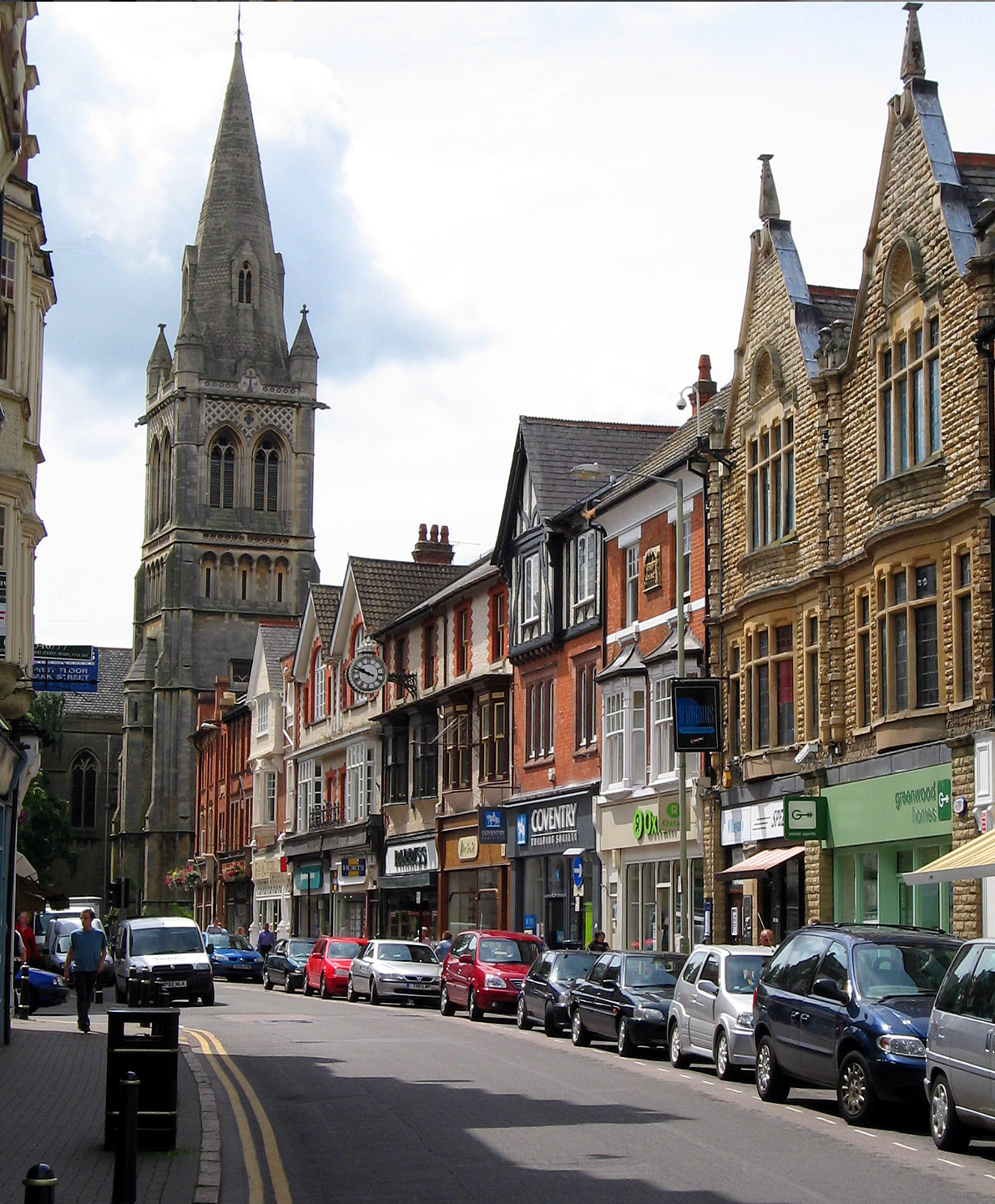
- Regent Street, Rugby, the largest settlement and administrative centre of the borough

- Shown within Warwickshire
- Sovereign state: United Kingdom
- Constituent country: England
- Region: West Midlands
- Administrative county: Warwickshire
- Admin. HQ: Rugby

Government
  - Type: Non-metropolitan borough
  - MPs: John Slinger (Rugby); Jeremy Wright (Kenilworth and Southam)

Area
  - Total: 136 sq mi (351 km^{2})
  - Rank: 101st

Population (2024)
  - Total: 122,378
  - Rank: Ranked 202nd
  - Density: 903/sq mi (349/km^{2})

Ethnicity (2021)
  - Ethnic groups: List: 85.7% White; 7.6% Asian; 2.8% Mixed; 2.7% Black; 1.1% other

Religion (2021)
  - Religion: List: 50.5% Christianity; 36.1% no religion; 1.8% Islam; 3.3% Hinduism; 0.1% Judaism; 1.4% Sikhism; 0.4% Buddhism; 0.5% other; 5.9% not stated
- Time zone: UTC+0 (Greenwich Mean Time)
  - Summer (DST): UTC+1 (British Summer Time)
- ONS code: 44UD (ONS); E07000220 (GSS)

The Borough of Rugby is a local government district with borough status in Warwickshire, England. The borough comprises the town of Rugby where the council has its headquarters, and the rural areas surrounding the town. At the 2021 census the borough had a population of 114,400, of which 78,125 lived in the built-up area of Rugby. It includes a large area of the West Midlands Green Belt in the mostly rural area between Rugby and Coventry.

Between 2011 and 2021, the population of Rugby borough saw a 14.3% increase in population from around 100,100 to 114,400; the largest percentage increase of any local authority area in the West Midlands region.

The borough extends from Coventry in the west to Leicestershire and Northamptonshire in the east. It borders the Warwickshire districts of Nuneaton and Bedworth to the north-west, Stratford-on-Avon to the south, and Warwick to the south-west. The Leicestershire districts of Hinckley and Bosworth, Blaby and Harborough are to the north and north-east, whilst West Northamptonshire is to the south-east.

== History ==
The town of Rugby had been a local board district from 1849. Such districts became urban districts in 1894. At the same time the Rugby Rural District was created covering the surrounding rural parishes. The urban and rural districts had separate councils, both based in Rugby. In 1932, Rugby Urban District was upgraded to become a municipal borough, and its boundaries were expanded to include most of Bilton (including New Bilton), Brownsover, Hillmorton and Newbold-on-Avon.

The present borough was created on 1 April 1974 by the Local Government Act 1972. It was created by a merger of the municipal borough of Rugby (which covered the town of Rugby) and the Rugby Rural District. The new district was named Rugby after its largest settlement. The district was awarded borough status from its creation, allowing the chair of the council to take the title of mayor, continuing Rugby's series of mayors dating back to 1932.

== Abolition ==
Under current local government reorganisation plans, all district councils in Warwickshire, as well as the county council, will be abolished in 2028, with the district forming part of a new North Warwickshire unitary authority, also including the areas of the North Warwickshire and Nuneaton and Bedworth districts.

== Governance ==
Rugby Borough Council

Type
- Type: Non-metropolitan district

Leadership
- Mayor: Nooria Sayani, Labour since 21 May 2026
- Leader: Michael Moran, Labour since 5 June 2024
- Chief Executive: Dan Green since 13 February 2025

Structure
- Seats: 42 councillors
- Graph of the party split among 42 seats.
- Political groups: Administration (24) Liberal Democrats (12) Labour (12) Other parties (18) Conservative (15) Reform (3)
- Length of term: 4 years

Elections
- Voting system: First past the post
- Last election: May 2026

Meeting place
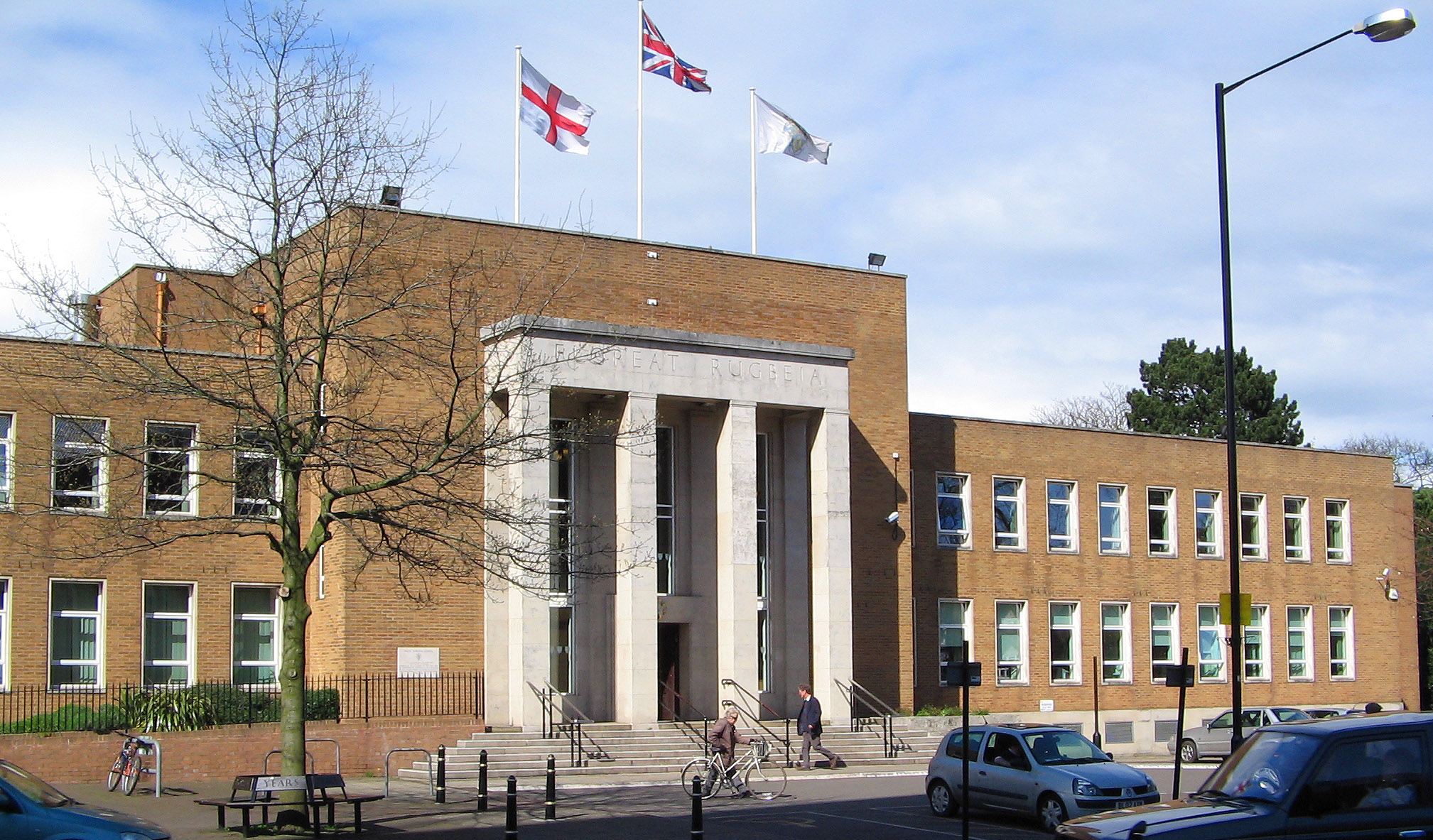
- Town Hall, Evreux Way, Rugby, CV21 2RR

Website
- www.rugby.gov.uk

Rugby Borough Council provides district-level services. County-level services are provided by Warwickshire County Council. Much of the borough is also covered by civil parishes, which form a third tier of local government for their areas.

=== Political control ===
The council has been under no overall control since 2023. Following the 2024 election, a minority Labour administration formed to run the council with informal support from the Liberal Democrats. In May 2026 Labour and the Liberal Democrats formally formed a coalition.

Political control of the council since the 1974 reforms has been as follows:

| Party in control | Years |
|---|---|
| No overall control | 1974–1976 |
| Conservative | 1976–1979 |
| No overall control | 1979–1987 |
| Conservative | 1987–1990 |
| No overall control | 1990–2007 |
| Conservative | 2007–2016 |
| No overall control | 2016–2018 |
| Conservative | 2018–2023 |
| No overall control | 2023–present |

=== Leadership ===
The role of mayor is largely ceremonial in Rugby. Political leadership is instead provided by the leader of the council. The leaders since 1974 have been:

| Councillor | Party | From | To |
|---|---|---|---|
| Ken Marriott | Conservative | 1 Apr 1974 | 16 Aug 1977 |
| Harold Cox | Conservative | 1977 | 1978 |
| Gordon Collett | Conservative | 1978 | May 1986 |
| Lionel Franklyn | Conservative | May 1986 | May 1989 |
| Gordon Collett | Conservative | May 1989 | May 1993 |
| Lionel Franklyn | Conservative | May 1993 | May 1995 |
| Bryan Levy | Labour | May 1995 | May 2000 |
| Steve Stewart | Labour | May 2000 | 20 Jun 2001 |
| Alan Webb | Labour | 20 Jun 2001 | May 2002 |
| Craig Humphrey | Conservative | May 2002 | 31 Aug 2014 |
| Michael Stokes | Conservative | Sep 2014 | 16 May 2019 |
| Seb Lowe | Conservative | 16 May 2019 | May 2023 |
| Derek Poole | Conservative | 18 May 2023 | 5 Jun 2024 |
| Michael Moran | Labour | 5 Jun 2024 | May 2026 |
| Louise Robinson | Labour | 21 May 2026 | |

=== Composition ===
Following the 2026 election, the composition of the council was:

| Party | Councillors |
|---|---|
| Conservative | 15 |
| Labour | 12 |
| Liberal Democrats | 12 |
| Reform | 3 |
| Total | 42 |

=== Elections ===
Since the last full review of boundaries in 2012 the council has comprised 42 councillors representing sixteen wards, with each ward electing either one or three councillors. Elections are held three years out of every four, with a third of the council being elected each time for a four-year term of office. Warwickshire County Council elections are held in the fourth year of the cycle when there are no borough council elections.

=== Premises ===
The council is based at Rugby Town Hall on Évreux Way in the town centre, which was purpose-built for the old borough council and opened in 1961.

== Parishes ==
The borough of Rugby has 41 civil parishes mainly covering the rural areas of the borough. Rugby town is an unparished area and so does not have a separate town council.

Here is a list of parishes in the borough, some of which contain several settlements. Where a parish contains more than one settlement these are listed in brackets:

- Ansty,
- Binley Woods, Birdingbury, Bourton and Draycote, Brandon and Bretford, Brinklow, Burton Hastings
- Cawston, Church Lawford, Churchover, Clifton-upon-Dunsmore, Combe Fields, Copston Magna, Cosford,
- Dunchurch (incl: Toft)
- Easenhall
- Frankton,
- Grandborough
- Harborough Magna
- King's Newnham
- Leamington Hastings (incl: Broadwell, Hill & Kites Hardwick), Little Lawford, Long Lawford
- Marton, Monks Kirby,
- Newton and Biggin
- Pailton, Princethorpe
- Ryton-on-Dunsmore
- Shilton and Barnacle, Stretton Baskerville, Stretton-on-Dunsmore, Stretton-under-Fosse
- Thurlaston,
- Wibtoft, Willey, Willoughby, Withybrook, Wolfhampcote (incl: Flecknoe & Sawbridge), Wolston, Wolvey.

== Places of interest ==
Places of interest in Rugby town include:

- The Rugby School Museum, which has audio-visual displays about the history of Rugby School and of the town.
- Rugby Art Gallery and Museum. The art gallery contains a nationally recognised collection of contemporary art. The museum contains, amongst other things, Roman artefacts dug up from the nearby Roman settlement of Tripontium.
- The Webb Ellis Rugby Football Museum, where traditional rugby balls are handmade. It contains much rugby football memorabilia.
- The Benn Hall, a conference, seminar, exhibition and party venue.
- Newbold Quarry Park, nature reserve
- Swift Valley Nature Reserve

Places of interest around Rugby include:

- Brandon Marsh
- Brinklow Castle
- Coombe Abbey
- Draycote Water – Reservoir and nature reserve
- Garden Organic
- Oxford Canal

== See also ==
- List of wards in Rugby borough by population
