= Weston under Wetherley =

Village in Warwickshire, England

Coordinates: 52.32°N 1.47°W

Weston Under Wetherley
- Location within Warwickshire
- Population: 468 (2011)
- OS grid reference: SP361691
- Civil parish: Weston under Wetherley
- District: Warwick
- Shire county: Warwickshire
- Region: West Midlands
- Country: England
- Sovereign state: United Kingdom
- Post town: LEAMINGTON SPA
- Postcode district: CV33
- Dialling code: 01926
- Police: Warwickshire
- Fire: Warwickshire
- Ambulance: West Midlands
- UK Parliament: Warwick and Leamington

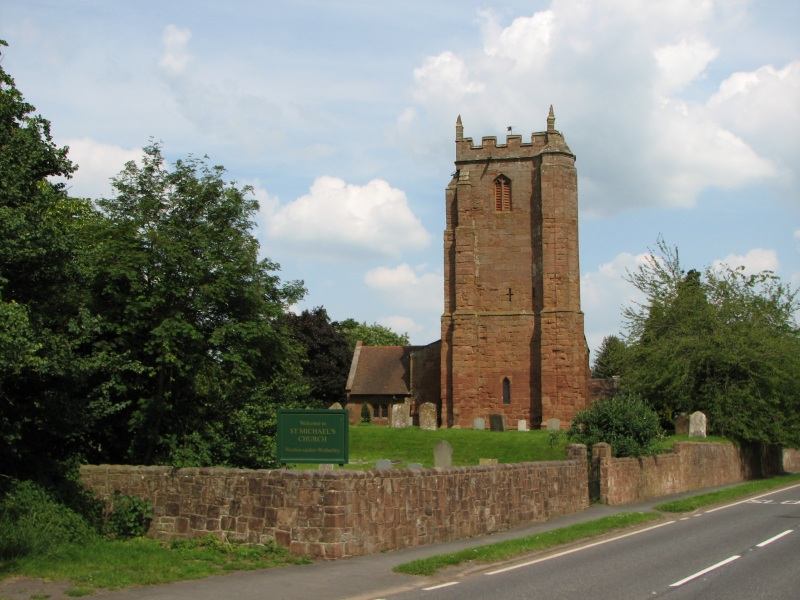
St. Michael's Church, Weston under Wetherly

Weston under Wetherley, often known by locals as just Weston, is a small village and civil parish in Warwickshire, England. It is on the B4453, 4 miles (6.4 km) northeast of the closest town, Royal Leamington Spa. According to the 2001 Census the village had a population of 454 living in 164 houses. The population taken at the 2011 Census was 468. The most notable buildings is the parish church of Saint Michael. Weston is unusual amongst settlements in the United Kingdom of its size in that there is not a single shop there, the last being demolished in the 1990s, nor a pub, which was closed in 2014.

Another place to be closed in the 1990s was Weston Hospital which had previously treated people from all around the area. On the hospital site modern houses have been built as well as a children's playground and a village hall. Just to the north of the village is Weston and Waverley Wood. The Conservative Party politician, Dudley Smith is one of the best known people to have lived in the village. In November 1605 a group of men, including Robert Catesby, who were involved in the Gunpowder Plot, passed through the village. They were fleeing from London after the arrest of Guy Fawkes. Apparently they were on their way to Wales (via Warwick Castle to steal fresh horses), after a meeting at Dunchurch, near Rugby.
