= Shipston-on-Stour Rural District =

Rural district of Worcestershire and later Warwickshire

Coordinates: 52.06°N 1.60°W

Shipston on Stour was a rural district in England from 1894 to 1974.

The district covered an area around Shipston-on-Stour. Originally it was a detached part of Worcestershire, but in 1931 it was transferred to the jurisdiction of Warwickshire, and was expanded by the abolition of Brailes Rural District.

The district was abolished in 1974 under the Local Government Act 1972 and now forms part of the Stratford-on-Avon district.

== See also ==
- Evolution of Worcestershire county boundaries
