= Bushwood =

Hamlet in Warwickshire, England

Coordinates: 52.319°N 1.736°W

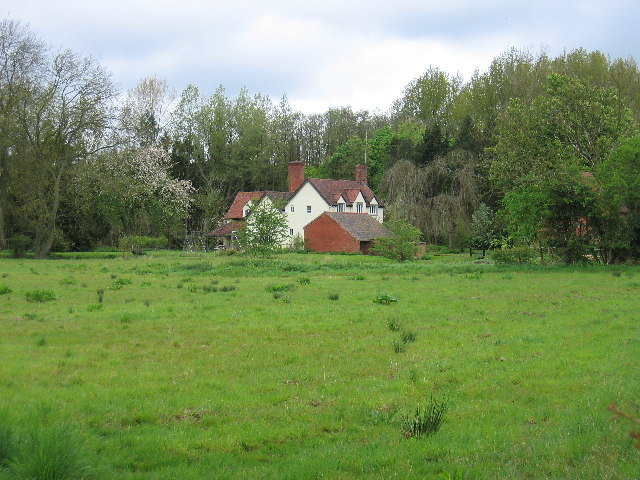
Bushwood Hall

Bushwood is a hamlet in Warwickshire, located three miles north of Henley in Arden and a mile west of the M40 motorway. There is no village centre as such because all the buildings in the hamlet are spread out so widely. It was once part of the health board of Stratford-on-Avon. The Stratford-on-Avon Canal runs along the eastern edge of the settlement.

Population details can be found under Rowington.

It is named after the wood, Bush Wood, that runs through the centre of the area. "Bushwood" is a corruption of byssopswode or Bishop's Wood, which refers to its former ownership by the bishops of Worcester, dating back to the 9th century. The wood itself is an ancient deer park, with an earthwork along its lower boundary.

The manor house, Bushwood Hall, is located on a moated site at the northern end of the settlement. Sir William Dugdale and subsequent writers have confused it with the with the nearby manor house of Lapworth. However, Bushwood was a separate manor from Lapworth, and passed with Lapworth into the Catesby family on the marriage of Philippa, daughter of William de Bishopsdon, to Sir William Catesby in the 15th century. Bushwood then became the chief Warwickshire seat of the Catesbys and the reputed birthplace of Robert Catesby, the Gunpowder Plot conspirator, born in 1572/3. The current building dates to 1620, with a timber-framed rear wing of 1708. The moat remains intact and contains water all the way round.
