= Priors Marston =

Village and civil parish in Warwickshire, England

Coordinates: 52°12′N 1°17′W

Priors Marston is a village and civil parish in the Stratford-on-Avon District of Warwickshire, England, 6 miles (9.7 km) southeast of Southam. The Oxford Canal and Jurassic Way both run nearby. According to the 2001 Census the population of the parish is 506, increasing to 579 at the 2011 Census, most of whom live in the village. In the village's toponym, "Priors" records the fact the village belonged to St Mary's Priory in Coventry. "Marston" combines the Old English words Merse referring to a lake which formed a fishery in the early history of the village and tun meaning a settlement. The village has a primary school called The Priors School. The school was originally a state school, opened in 1847. However, in August 1996 the school was forced to close. After a month of intensive fundraising and planning the school re-opened, offering free education to village residents, and also accepting fee paying pupils from further afield. The school raised over £1.2m during 15 years of self-regulation until 1 September 2011, when it became one of the first of 22 new free schools to open in the United Kingdom. This returned the school to state funding but was independently managed.

The Church of England parish church is dedicated to Saint Leonard and is part of The Bridges Group of local churches. The earliest known church on this site was built in the 13th century. The tower dates from the 17th and 18th centuries, but the building was largely rebuilt in 1863 as it stands today. The church has recently undergone a significant renovation and improvement programme - including the addition of a kitchen and toilet, removing Victorian block work and modern organ pipe facade to reinstate and glaze an older arch to the tower, and removal of pews at the rear (west end) of the church. The village hall, called Priors Hall is modern and is a joint venture with Priors Hardwick. It caters for up to 250 people, and the offices of several local businesses are based there. It also acts as an occasional cinema. The village also has a part-time post office, a sports and social club, a Book Club and a children's playground. There is also a country pub called The Hollybush Inn. The village, being remote, only got a mains supply of electricity in 1934 and of water in 1948. The village has a disused Moravian Church.

== Notable residents ==
- Caroline Bradley, renowned showjumper, lived in Priors Marston and is buried there.
