= Eathorpe =

Village in Warwickshire, England

Coordinates: 52.318°N 1.427°W

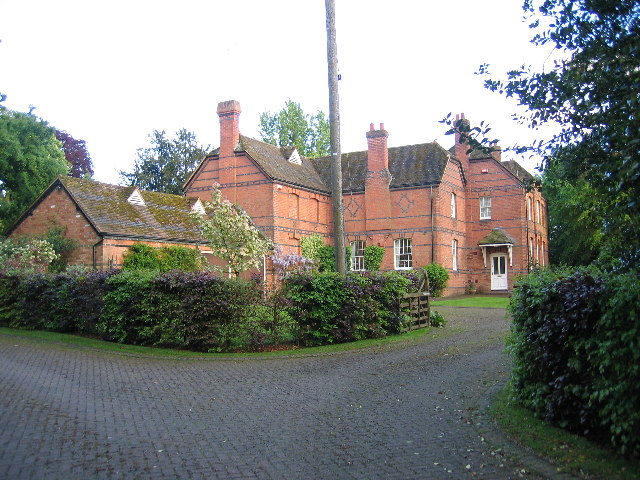
Housing units, previously the stables of Eathorpe Hall

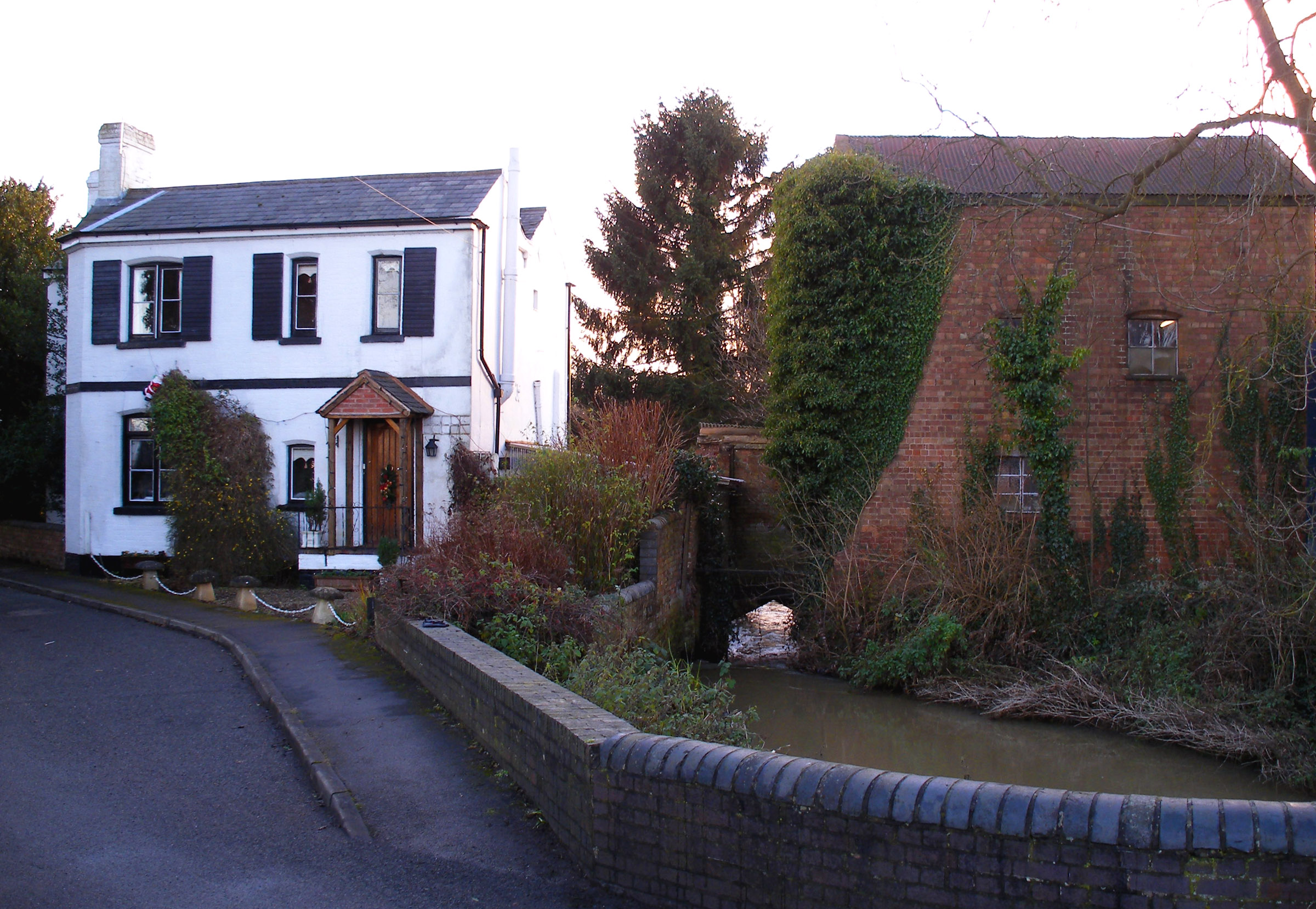
The millstream at Eathorpe with the abandoned mill to the right and Millhouse to the left

Eathorpe is a small village and civil parish five miles east of Leamington Spa, in Warwickshire, England. The parish is part of the electoral ward of Cubbington. It is close to the B4455, which follows the line of the Roman Fosse Way, and the River Leam. According to the 2001 census, the parish had a population of 113, increasing to 190 at the 2011 census. The village has a village hall, the original being built in the early 1970s. Previously the only public house was The Plough, an 18th-century former coaching inn situated beside the Fosse Way. This has been closed since 2024.

The first mention of a post office in Eathorpe was in 1875, but the village post office closed in March 1999. Eathorpe Hall is the former home of Samuel Shepheard, who built the original Shepheard's Hotel in Cairo, Egypt. An inscription on the bridge, over the River Leam, which links Eathorpe with the nearby village of Wappenbury reads: "This bridge was erected by Samuel Shepheard of Eathorpe Hall, 1862". Close to the bridge is a pipeline which feeds water from the Leam to nearby Draycote Water. This pipeline was used to fill the reservoir when it opened in 1966.
