= Watergall =

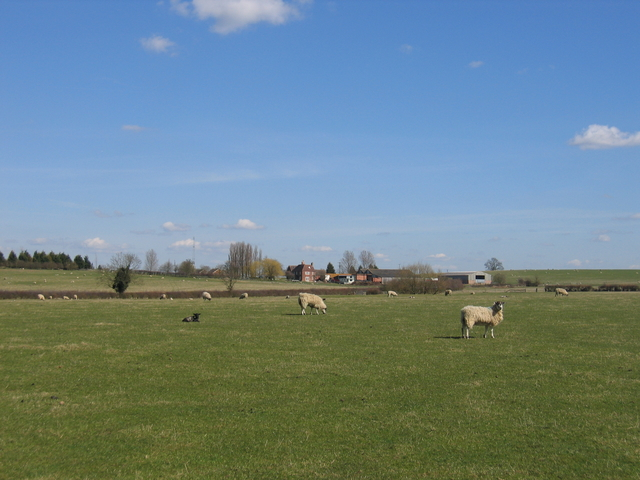

- Location within Warwickshire
- Civil parish: Watergall
- District: Stratford-on-Avon
- Shire county: Warwickshire
- Region: West Midlands
- Country: England
- Sovereign state: United Kingdom
- Post town: Southam
- Postcode district: CV47
- UK Parliament: Kenilworth and Southam

Watergall is a civil parish near Southam, Warwickshire, England. It lies in the Stratford-on-Avon district. The nearest city is Coventry, about 15.5 miles (25 km) away.

== History ==
Watergall was an extra-parochial area until 1858, when it became a civil parish. Watergall is believed to be a medieval shrunken village and contains no present-day settlements.
