= Stoneton =

Hamlet and manor in Warwickshire, England

Coordinates: 52°11′25″N 1°18′55″W

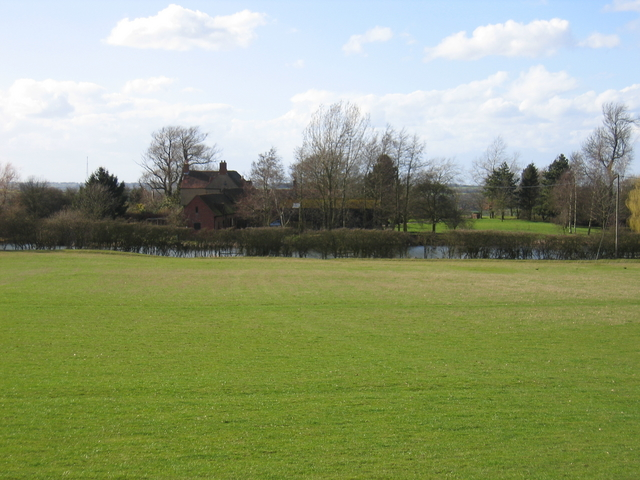
Stoneton Manor

Stoneton is a hamlet, civil parish and manor in Warwickshire, England. It lies just to the northeast of Wormleighton. It was documented in the Domesday Book. From the late 15th century onwards the wealthy Spencer family owned land here, and owned the manor in conjunction with nearby Wormleighton Manor. Little remains of the original village, which lies in a field next to the manor. The moat has been restored to Stoneton Manor, using water supplied from a nearby spring. A windfarm with 8-13 turbines has been proposed in the vicinity since June 2012, with a capacity of up to 16 MW of low carbon energy.

Stoneton was originally an extra-parochial place within Northamptonshire. In 1858 it became a civil parish of its own. In 1895 it was transferred to Warwickshire.
