= Easenhall =

Village in Warwickshire, England

Coordinates: 52.412001°N 1.318593°W

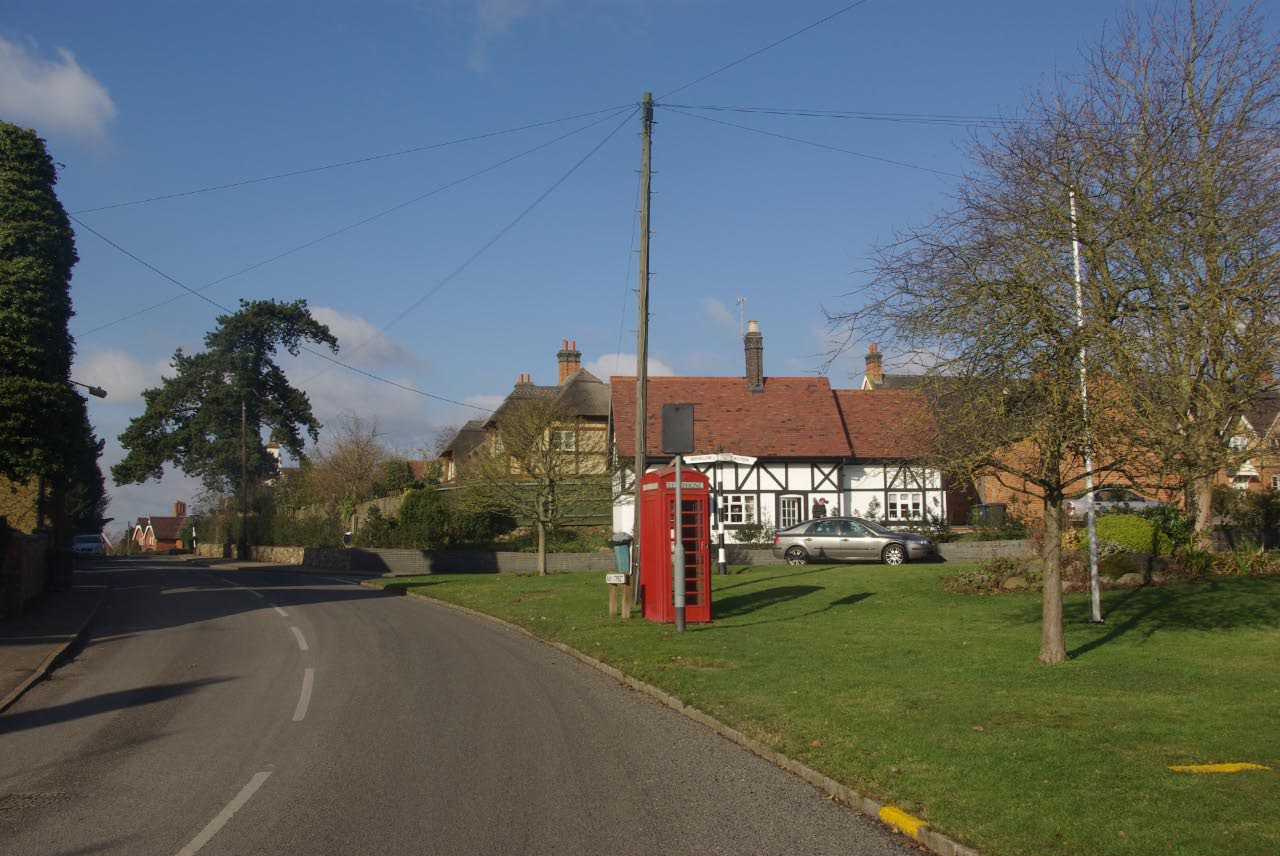
- Easenhall Main Street

- Location within Warwickshire
- Population: 255 (2021 census)
- Civil parish: Easenhall
- District: Rugby
- Shire county: Warwickshire
- Region: West Midlands
- Country: England
- Sovereign state: United Kingdom
- Post town: RUGBY
- Postcode district: CV23
- Dialling code: 01788
- Police: Warwickshire
- Fire: Warwickshire
- Ambulance: West Midlands
- UK Parliament: Rugby

Easenhall is a small village and civil parish in Warwickshire, England, three miles north-west of the town of Rugby and a mile south of the M6 motorway. According to the 2011 Census the parish had a population of 291, reducing to 255 at the 2021 Census.

Easenhall lies on a country lane between the villages of Harborough Magna one mile to the east, and Brinklow two miles to the west. It was originally an estate village of the aristocratic Newbold Revel estate. It is thought likely that the name of the village is derived from "OEsa's Hill" with the name being first recorded in the 13th century registers as Esenhull, Esenhill, Hessenhull and similar spellings.

From the Anglo-Saxon period to the 19th century the village, as part of the Newbold Revel estate, was part of the very large parish of Monks Kirby. Since the nineteenth century parish reforms Easenhall has been a separate civil parish, but is now part of the ecclesiastical parish of Harborough Magna.

There is a former Congregational Chapel on the Main Street in the village, dating from 1873, which is now used as the village hall. Another notable building on Main Street is the Golden Lion pub which dates from 1640.

The West Coast Main Line railway and Oxford Canal pass through the parish to the south of the village, the parish also includes the hamlet of Hungerfield.
