= Priors Hardwick =

Village in Warwickshire, England

Coordinates: 52.20°N 1.31°W

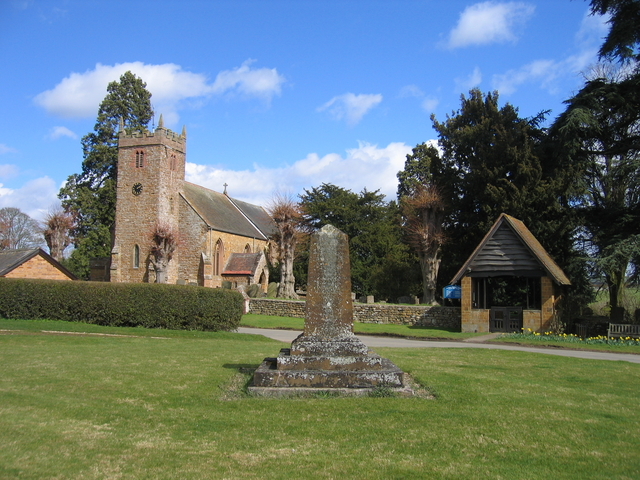
- Priors Hardwick war memorial and parish church

- Location within Warwickshire
- Population: 172 (2011 Census)
- OS grid reference: SP470559
- Civil parish: Priors Hardwick
- District: Stratford-on-Avon
- Shire county: Warwickshire
- Region: West Midlands
- Country: England
- Sovereign state: United Kingdom
- Post town: Southam
- Postcode district: CV47
- Dialling code: 01327
- Police: Warwickshire
- Fire: Warwickshire
- Ambulance: West Midlands
- UK Parliament: Kenilworth and Southam

Priors Hardwick is a village and civil parish in the Stratford district of Warwickshire, England. The population of the civil parish as taken at the 2011 census was 172. The name derives from the fact that it was originally a manor belonging to the Priors of Coventry.

== History ==
The oldest houses in the village are centred on the village green, with The Butcher's Arms dated as 1562, although some sources place it back as far as 1375.

The proximity to the drover's road known as the Welsh Road influenced the village and the naming of local landmarks. The cattle drovers used to water their animals at a pond outside the village, which resulted in it being named Cowpool. This is unusual, since locally, such waterholes were named pits, rather than the Welsh-derived name pool (pwyll). London End in the village, and various buildings with welsh in their name also derive from the closeness of the road.

The original settlement is on the government's list of scheduled monuments with most of the village being enclosed in a conservation area.

In 1831 the area of the parish was 1,600 acres (6 km^{2}), which was reduced to 1,535 acres (6 km^{2}) some time between 1881 and 1891 In 1836 the village became part of the Southam Poor Law Union which ran a workhouse in Southam. Until 1974, the parish belonged to the Southam Rural District.

=== Population ===
According to census information the population figures have been:

- in 1831 there were 69 males aged over 20
- Total Population

Year	Total population	Males	Females
1801	228	110	118
1811	252	120	132
1821	263	132	131
1831	296	153	143
1841	280	138	142
1851	303	159	144
1861	323	182	141
1871	335	190	145
1881	280	141	139
1891	267	131	136
1901	225	115	110
1911	193	89	104
1921	177	88	89
1931	142	72	70
1951	151	72	79
1961	143	73	70
1971	162	n/a	n/a

=== Agriculture ===
In an 1801 survey the agricultural output of the parish was:

Crop	Area (acre)	Percent
Wheat	32	40%
Barley and oats	26	33%
Potatoes	2	3%
Peas and beans	19	24%
Turnips or rape	0	0
Rye	0	0
Other	0	0

=== Occupations ===
In an 1831 study the following occupations were categorised:

Occupation	Persons	Percent
Farmers employing labourers	9	13%
Farmers not employing labourers	1	1%
Agricultural labourers	39	58%
Manufacturing	0	0%
Retail and handicrafts	14	20%
Capitalists, professionals	1	1%
Labourers (non-agricultural)	2	3%
Servants	3	4%
Other	0	0

== Population ==
According to the 2001 census, the parish consists of 79 households with a population of 167 (80 males and 87 females). Of the 79 households, 63 were owner-occupied, 4 were rented from the council, and 12 were rented from a private landlord. 11 households had no car or van, 27 had one car or van, 23 had two and 18 had three or more. the mean population age was 43.88 and the median was 46. The average distance travelled to a fixed place of work was 24.25 km.

== Landmarks ==
The major business in the village is The Butcher's Arms, originally a pub, now a Portuguese restaurant.

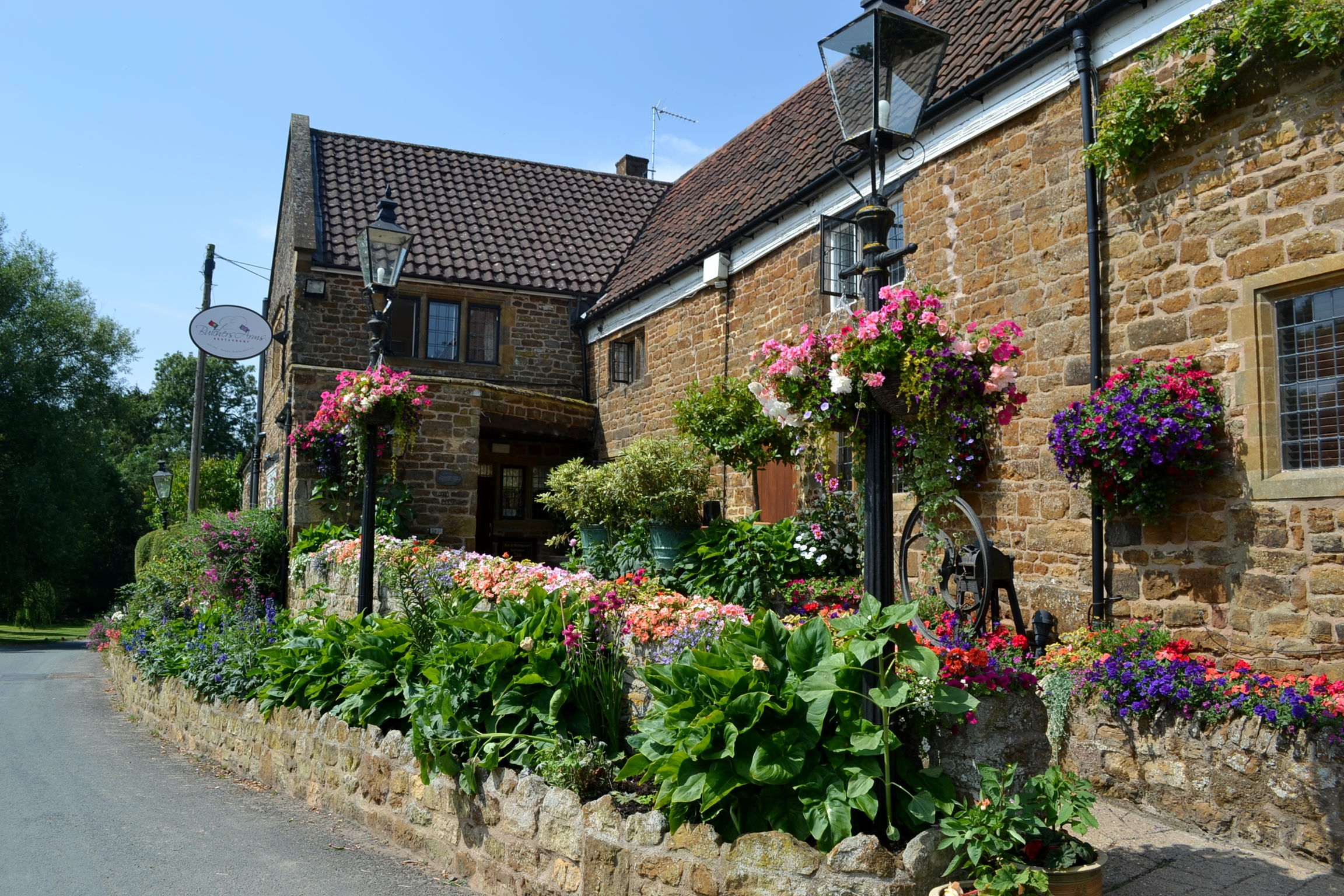
The Butcher's Arms External

The Anglican parish church of St Mary is a Grade II* listed building, with parts dating from the 12th century. It is part of the Bridges Group of Parishes.
