= Stretton-under-Fosse =

Village in Warwickshire, England

Coordinates: 52.42783°N 1.33815°W

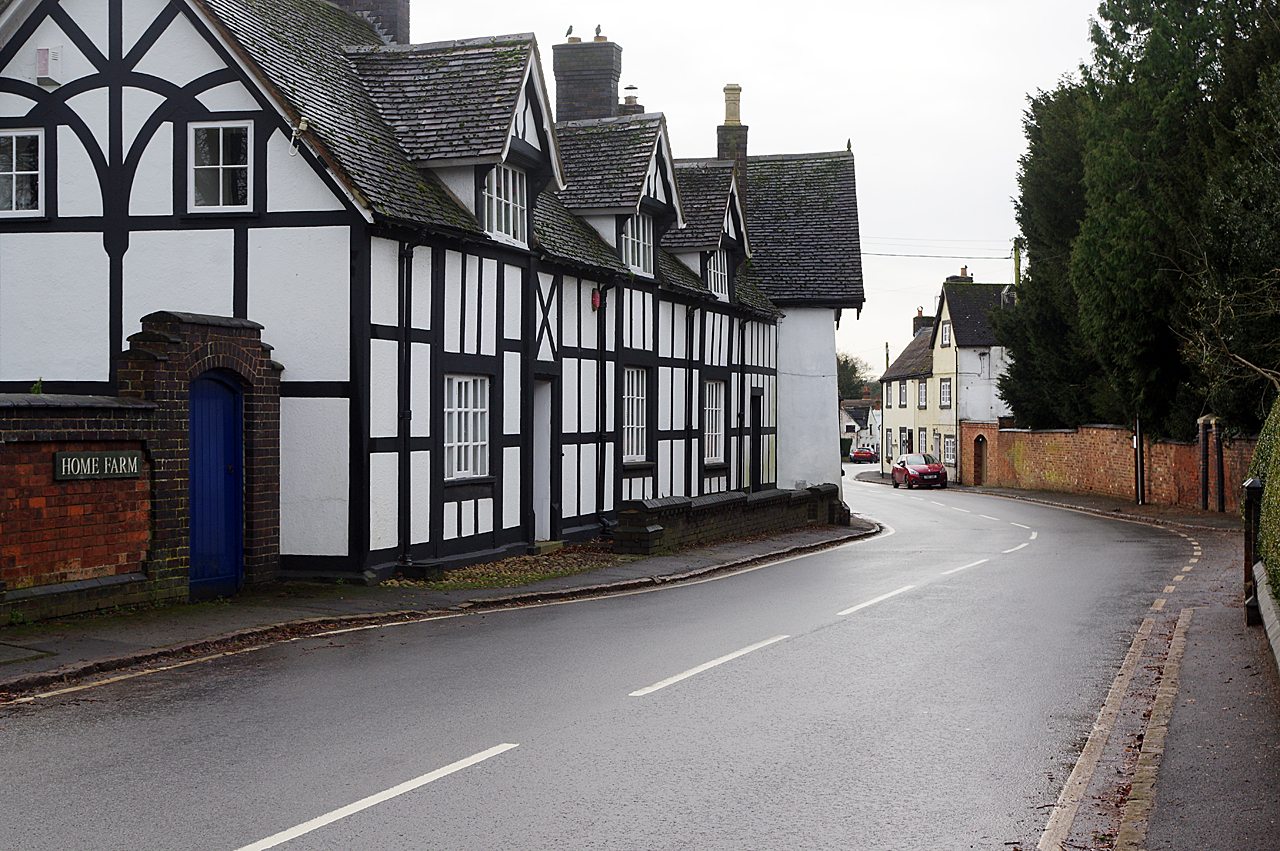
- Main Street, Stretton under Fosse

- Location within Warwickshire
- Population: 206 (2021)
- OS grid reference: SP451813
- Civil parish: Stretton-under-Fosse
- District: Rugby
- Shire county: Warwickshire
- Region: West Midlands
- Country: England
- Sovereign state: United Kingdom
- Post town: RUGBY
- Postcode district: CV23
- Dialling code: 01788
- Police: Warwickshire
- Fire: Warwickshire
- Ambulance: West Midlands
- UK Parliament: Rugby

Stretton-under-Fosse is a village and civil parish in the English county of Warwickshire. In the 2021 census the population of the parish was 206.

The village is located just east of the Fosse Way former Roman road, and just south of the M6 motorway. It contains a number of old cottages along its main street. Just outside Stretton is an old manor house, Newbold Revel, which is currently used as a training college for prison officers. Just south of the village is the Oxford Canal and a canal arm leading to Stretton Wharf.

Between 1847 and 1957, the village was served by nearby Brinklow railway station on the West Coast Main Line, which was originally known as Stretton station.

Stretton means "settlement on a Roman road" (from the Old English stræt and tun). In this case the road is Fosse Way.

== Historic buildings ==
There are 9 listed buildings by Historic England. These include several houses in Main Street and a cast iron canal bridge.
