= Church Lawford =

Village in Warwickshire, England

Coordinates: 52.384329°N 1.340922°W

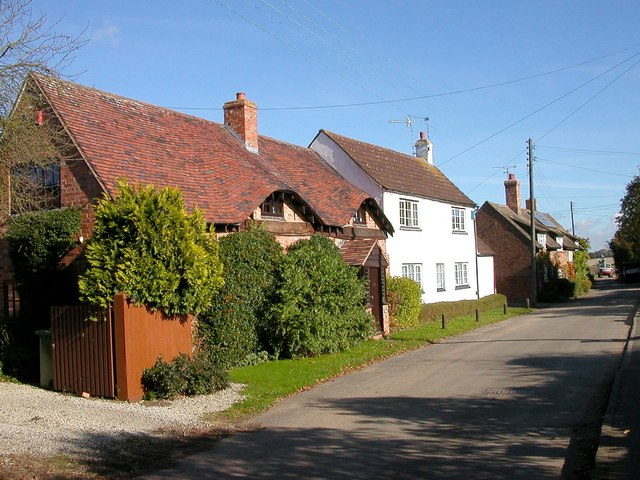
- Cottages on Church Street, Church Lawford

- Location within Warwickshire
- Population: 432 (2021)
- OS grid reference: SP449763
- District: Rugby
- Shire county: Warwickshire
- Region: West Midlands
- Country: England
- Sovereign state: United Kingdom
- Post town: COVENTRY
- Postcode district: CV23
- Dialling code: 024
- Police: Warwickshire
- Fire: Warwickshire
- Ambulance: West Midlands
- UK Parliament: Rugby

Church Lawford is a village and civil parish in Warwickshire, England. It is located just 2.5 miles (4 km) west of Rugby and 4.5 miles (7 km) east of Coventry. The population of the civil parish taken at the 2021 census was 432.

The village lies north of the A428 main road, between Coventry and Rugby, and the Rugby to Coventry railway line. From the main road, the village is on a descending slope into the valley of the River Avon. On the opposite side of the Avon, which is crossed by an old stone bridge, is the hamlet of King's Newnham. The village is one of several Lawfords in the locality, along with Long Lawford and Little Lawford to the east and north, and Lawford Heath to the south-east, although they are separate settlements.

The village was mentioned in the Domesday Book of 1086 as Leileford. The village church of St Peter was built on high ground overlooking the Avon in the 14th century. It was extensively rebuilt in the Victorian era, between 1873 and 1874. In 1960, it was designated a Grade II listed building.

The village once had a school, but this was closed in 1996. A reading room and village hall were built in 1912. But this was demolished in 2007 and replaced by a more modern building.

== RAF Church Lawford ==
There was a RAF training station situated just over 1 mile (1.6 km) south of the village from 1941 until 1955 called RAF Church Lawford.

== Climate ==
Church Lawford has an oceanic climate typical of the English interior. Temperatures are mild for the latitude, and winter nights average above freezing. Summers are highly variable depending on wind patterns, with a record of 38.7 °C (101.7 °F) despite the mild averages. Annual rainfall is moderate, but frequent drizzle results in about 125 precipitation days yearly.

Climate data for Church Lawford (1991–2020 normals), sunshine from Coventry, extremes 1983–present
Month	Jan	Feb	Mar	Apr	May	Jun	Jul	Aug	Sep	Oct	Nov	Dec	Year
Record high °C (°F)	14.7 (58.5)	17.7 (63.9)	22.4 (72.3)	25.5 (77.9)	27.5 (81.5)	31.3 (88.3)	38.7 (101.7)	36.3 (97.3)	30.6 (87.1)	27.6 (81.7)	18.4 (65.1)	15.3 (59.5)	38.7 (101.7)
Mean maximum °C (°F)	12.3 (54.1)	12.9 (55.2)	16.1 (61.0)	20.1 (68.2)	24.1 (75.4)	27.0 (80.6)	29.4 (84.9)	28.7 (83.7)	24.4 (75.9)	19.3 (66.7)	15.1 (59.2)	12.9 (55.2)	30.6 (87.1)
Mean daily maximum °C (°F)	7.1 (44.8)	7.8 (46.0)	10.4 (50.7)	13.6 (56.5)	16.7 (62.1)	19.8 (67.6)	22.3 (72.1)	21.8 (71.2)	18.7 (65.7)	14.3 (57.7)	10.0 (50.0)	7.4 (45.3)	14.2 (57.5)
Daily mean °C (°F)	4.3 (39.7)	4.7 (40.5)	6.6 (43.9)	9.0 (48.2)	11.9 (53.4)	14.9 (58.8)	17.1 (62.8)	16.9 (62.4)	14.4 (57.9)	10.9 (51.6)	7.1 (44.8)	4.6 (40.3)	10.2 (50.4)
Mean daily minimum °C (°F)	1.5 (34.7)	1.5 (34.7)	2.7 (36.9)	4.3 (39.7)	7.1 (44.8)	10.0 (50.0)	11.9 (53.4)	12.0 (53.6)	10.0 (50.0)	7.4 (45.3)	4.1 (39.4)	1.8 (35.2)	6.2 (43.1)
Mean minimum °C (°F)	−4.7 (23.5)	−4.3 (24.3)	−3.3 (26.1)	−1.7 (28.9)	0.3 (32.5)	4.6 (40.3)	6.9 (44.4)	6.6 (43.9)	4.0 (39.2)	0.9 (33.6)	−2.4 (27.7)	−4.7 (23.5)	−7.1 (19.2)
Record low °C (°F)	−14.5 (5.9)	−12.2 (10.0)	−8.5 (16.7)	−4.9 (23.2)	−2.2 (28.0)	−0.2 (31.6)	3.4 (38.1)	3.7 (38.7)	−0.1 (31.8)	−3.8 (25.2)	−8.2 (17.2)	−12.5 (9.5)	−14.5 (5.9)
Average precipitation mm (inches)	58.0 (2.28)	44.2 (1.74)	43.0 (1.69)	46.5 (1.83)	55.0 (2.17)	55.1 (2.17)	60.0 (2.36)	67.0 (2.64)	57.8 (2.28)	67.4 (2.65)	63.6 (2.50)	59.6 (2.35)	677.2 (26.66)
Average precipitation days (≥ 1.0 mm)	12.0	10.1	10.2	9.9	9.9	9.2	9.0	9.7	9.6	10.7	12.2	12.0	124.5
Mean monthly sunshine hours	55	75	115	147	192	185	198	180	137	101	63	61	1,509
Source 1: Met Office
Source 2: Infoclimat
