= Willey, Warwickshire =

Village in England

Coordinates: 52.45891°N 1.27293°W

Willey
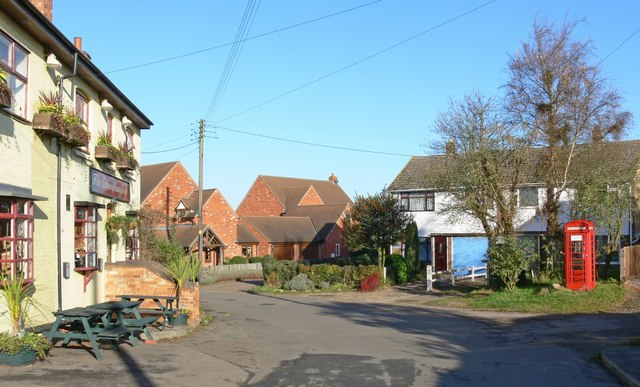
- The Main Street in Willey

- Location within Warwickshire
- Population: 148 (2021)
- OS grid reference: SP495848
- Civil parish: Willey
- District: Rugby
- Shire county: Warwickshire
- Region: West Midlands
- Country: England
- Sovereign state: United Kingdom
- Post town: Rugby
- Postcode district: CV23
- Police: Warwickshire
- Fire: Warwickshire
- Ambulance: West Midlands
- UK Parliament: Rugby

Willey is a rural village and civil parish in the English county of Warwickshire. The parish had a population of 148 as of the 2021 census.

Willey is the only village in Warwickshire to have a name likely of pre-Christian origin. The name is thought to derive from the Old English weoh which means "temple or holy place," which may therefore mean the village was the site of such a temple or shrine.

Administratively, Willey forms part of the borough of Rugby; geographically it is about six miles (10 km) north of Rugby, just west of the A5 road (Watling Street) that marks the county boundary with Leicestershire. Just to the east of the village are the remains of the dismantled Rugby to Leicester railway line.

The village church of St Leonard in Willey is Grade II* listed.

The village pub in Willey was called the "Sarah Mansfield"; it gained that name in the 1970s, when the then licensee named it in memory of his grandmother. The pub had previously named "The Plough". In 2020 it was bought by Adam Taylor, husband of Carly Taylor, the owner of the famous Crooked House pub in Staffordshire. In September 2020, the new owners internally gutted the pub before any planning applications could be made, resulting in an order to stop by Rugby Borough Council. The pub has not reopened.
