= Wibtoft =

Village in Warwickshire, England

Coordinates: 52.482983°N 1.300466°W

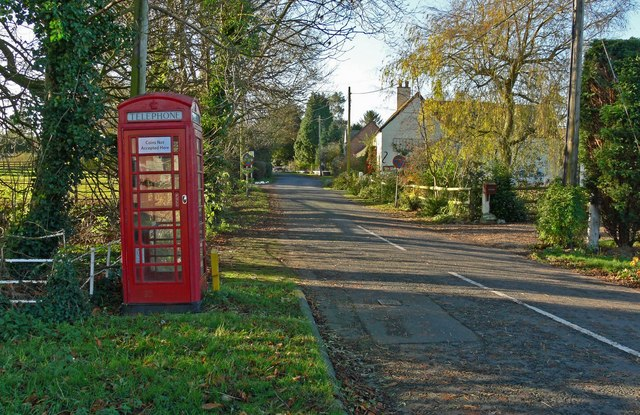
- Green Lane, Wibtoft

- Location within Warwickshire
- Population: 62 (2021)
- OS grid reference: SP4787
- Civil parish: Wibtoft
- District: Rugby
- Shire county: Warwickshire
- Region: West Midlands
- Country: England
- Sovereign state: United Kingdom
- Post town: LUTTERWORTH
- Postcode district: LE17
- Dialling code: 01455
- Police: Warwickshire
- Fire: Warwickshire
- Ambulance: West Midlands
- UK Parliament: Rugby

Wibtoft is a small village and civil parish in north-eastern Warwickshire, England. The village was originally within the civil parish of Claybrooke Magna in Leicestershire. According to the 2021 Census, it had a population of 62.

The village is next to the A5 road (Watling Street), which here defines the border between Warwickshire and Leicestershire. Wibtoft is about 8 miles (13 km) north of Rugby and is in an outlying part of the Borough of Rugby. About half a mile north of Wibtoft, on the corner of the parish boundary is High Cross (Veronae), the point at which the old Roman roads of Watling Street and Fosse Way cross. Near Wibtoft is the source of the River Soar.

Due to its location in a sheltered valley just south of High Cross, and local finds of Roman coins and stonework, some historians have speculated that it sits upon the site of a Roman settlement; William Dugdale believed that it occupied the site of the Roman town of Cleychester.

Wibtoft consists of a single narrow road called Green Lane. Due to its small size it has neither shops nor pubs, but does have a small church dedicated to St Mary The ecclesiastical parish crosses the county boundary and is 'Claybrooke cum Wibtoft' and thus falls in the Diocese of Leicester.

The name of the village has Danish origin, and was mentioned in the Domesday Book of 1086 as Wibetot.
