= Burton Hastings =

Village in Warwickshire, England

Coordinates: 52.505°N 1.396°W

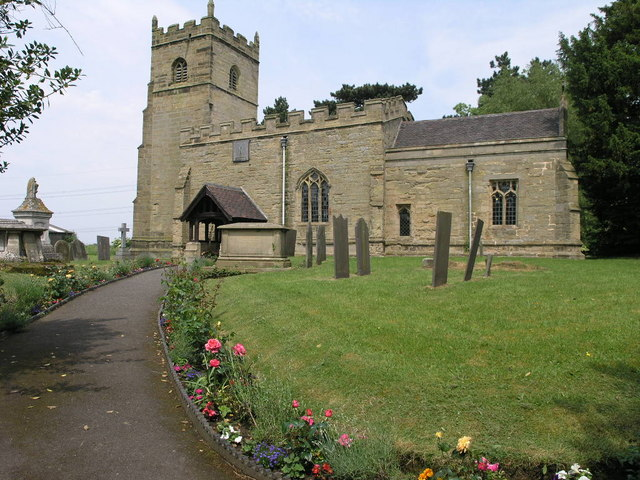
- Saint Botolph parish church

- Location within Warwickshire
- Population: 226 (2011)
- District: Rugby
- Shire county: Warwickshire
- Region: West Midlands
- Country: England
- Sovereign state: United Kingdom
- Post town: Nuneaton
- Postcode district: CV 11
- Dialling code: 01455
- Police: Warwickshire
- Fire: Warwickshire
- Ambulance: West Midlands

Burton Hastings is a village and civil parish in the English county of Warwickshire.

== Location ==
The village is in the northernmost part of the Borough of Rugby, it is however more than 10.7 miles (17.2 km) north-west of the town of Rugby and is much closer to the town of Nuneaton which is located 3.2 miles (5.1 km) to the east, and is 8.3 miles (13.4 km) north east of the city of Coventry. The nearest railway station is at Nuneaton. The northern parish boundary is a little south of the A5 trunk road known as Watling Street which is also the county boundary at this point between Warwickshire and Leicestershire. The northern boundary is marked by the Soar Brook which divides it from nearby Stretton Baskerville. The boundary to west and south is with Nuneaton, Bulkington, and Wolvey and the River Anker. The eastern boundary follows the road from Wolvey to Hinckley. A branch of the Coventry Canal system, known as the Ashby Canal passes through the west of the parish. The name derives from the Hastings family who held the manor until 1529. Burton Hastings is often used by commuters who work in nearby towns.

== Population ==
The current population of the village is around 250, falling to 226 at the 2011 Census. In 2001 there were 92 houses in the village, on five streets all of which branch off from Hinckley Road.

== Religion ==
The parish Church is called Saint Botolph and is located at the centre of the village.
