= Frankton, Warwickshire =

Village in Warwickshire, England

Coordinates: 52.33°N 1.38°W

Frankton
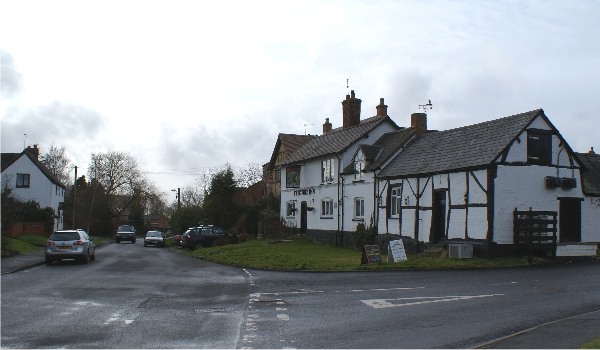
- Village centre, with the "Friendly Inn" on the right

- Location within Warwickshire
- Population: 382 (2021)
- OS grid reference: SP423701
- Civil parish: Frankton
- District: Rugby
- Shire county: Warwickshire
- Region: West Midlands
- Country: England
- Sovereign state: United Kingdom
- Post town: RUGBY
- Postcode district: CV23
- Dialling code: 01926
- Police: Warwickshire
- Fire: Warwickshire
- Ambulance: West Midlands

Frankton is a village and civil parish that is situated in the Rugby borough of Warwickshire in England. In the 2021 Census, it had a population of 382,

== Etymology ==
According to W. H. Duignan, the town's earliest name, Franchtone, was derived from the Anglo-Saxon Franca or Franco (the personal name of the original settler, which is probably derived from the national name of the Franks) and -tun, making it either "Franca's town" or "the town of the Franks".

== Location and history ==
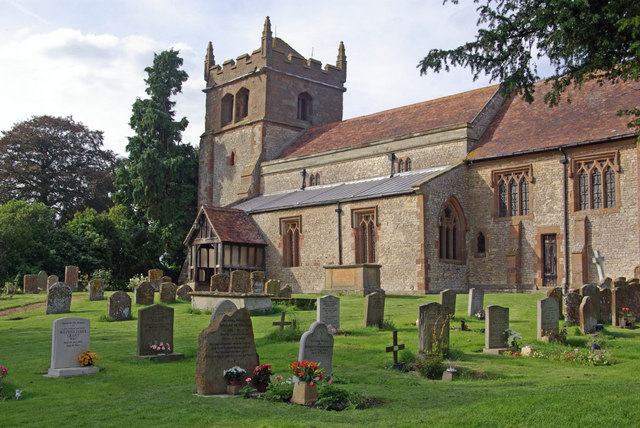
St Nicholas's Church

Frankton is located about six miles south-west of Rugby, adjacent to the B4453 road linking Rugby and Princethorpe. The village stands on a hill approximately 360 feet above sea level. There are houses ranging from the 18th century to modern buildings, and a public house. Saint Nicholas’s Church lies at the western end of the village, the earliest parts of which date from the 13th century. It is a Grade II* listed building.
