= King's Newnham =

Coordinates: 52.391°N 1.336°W

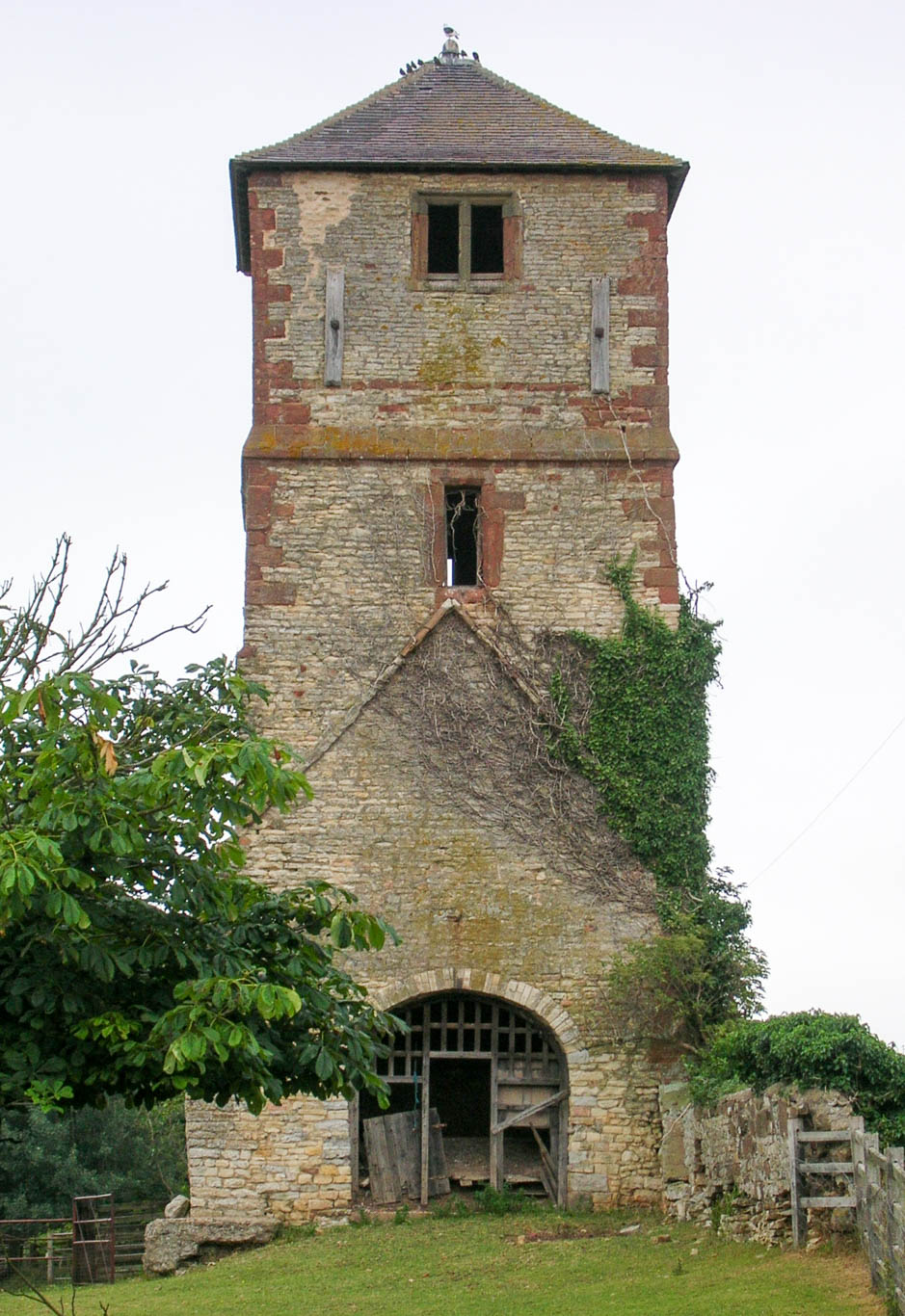
- Tower of Church of St Laurence

- Location within Warwickshire
- Population: 62 (2021 census)
- OS grid reference: SP452771
- District: Rugby
- Shire county: Warwickshire
- Region: West Midlands
- Country: England
- Sovereign state: United Kingdom
- Post town: COVENTRY
- Postcode district: CV23
- Dialling code: 024
- Police: Warwickshire
- Fire: Warwickshire
- Ambulance: West Midlands
- UK Parliament: Rugby

King's Newnham (otherwise known as Newnham Regis) is a village and civil parish located just under 2.5 miles (4 km) west of the town of Rugby and 4.5 miles (7 km) east of Coventry. It is within the borough of Rugby. In the 2021 census the parish had a population of 62.

== History ==
The village lost most of its population as a result of enclosures of the former royal manor. Its parish church, St Lawrence's, was built in the 12th century and partially demolished 1795–97. This left the mostly 16th-century bell tower and the church disused. The five other listed buildings of the parish are very close relative to the distant northern parish border: Farm Building near Newnham Hall, The Laurels, Highfield House, Newnham Hall and Manor Farmhouse.

== Today ==
For ecclesiastical purposes King's Newnham is joined with nearby Church Lawford from which it is separated by the Warwickshire Avon to the south. The parish council meets and shares the community facilities of Church Lawford community hall.
