= Pailton =

Coordinates: 52.4329°N 1.30703°W

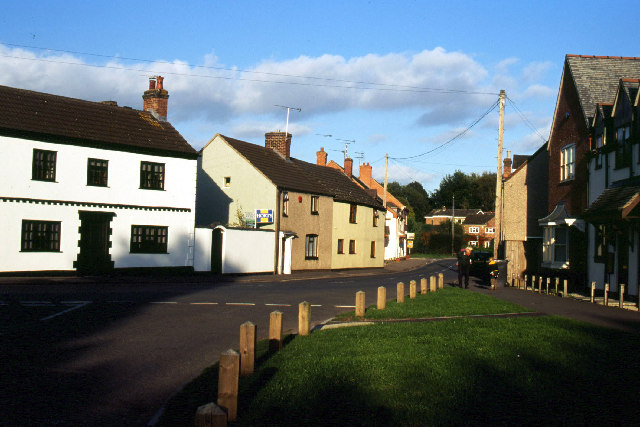
- Pailton village centre

- Location within Warwickshire
- Population: 483 (2021)
- OS grid reference: SP4781
- Civil parish: Pailton
- District: Rugby
- Shire county: Warwickshire
- Region: West Midlands
- Country: England
- Sovereign state: United Kingdom
- Post town: RUGBY
- Postcode district: CV23
- Dialling code: 01788
- Police: Warwickshire
- Fire: Warwickshire
- Ambulance: West Midlands
- UK Parliament: Rugby

Pailton is a village and civil parish in the Borough of Rugby, Warwickshire, England. Its population in 2001 was recorded as 482, increasing at the 2011 Census to 516, reducing again to 483 in the 2021 Census. The village was originally known as Pailington.

Pailton is located approximately five miles northwest of Rugby and about five miles southwest of Lutterworth. It lies at a crossroads of three roads, one towards Rugby to the south, one towards Lutterworth to the east, and Nuneaton and Coventry towards the west.

The former White Lion pub which ceased trading early in 2014 is one of the largest buildings in the village, through much of the twentieth century there were three pubs in the village (The White Lion, The Plough, both former coaching inns, and The Fox). In May 2024 it was announced that The White Lion had been awarded a grant of over £2m to restore the property as a Pub, Hotel and Community Hub with shops funded by the National Lottery Heritage Fund.

At the crossroads is the village green with a recently restored war memorial. About one mile east of Pailton is a radio station operated by the United Kingdom's National Air Traffic Services and is used for measurement and calibration purposes.

The village church of St. Denys is built of red brick and dates from 1884.
