= Cosford, Warwickshire =

Hamlet and civil parish in England

Coordinates: 52.408°N 1.265°W

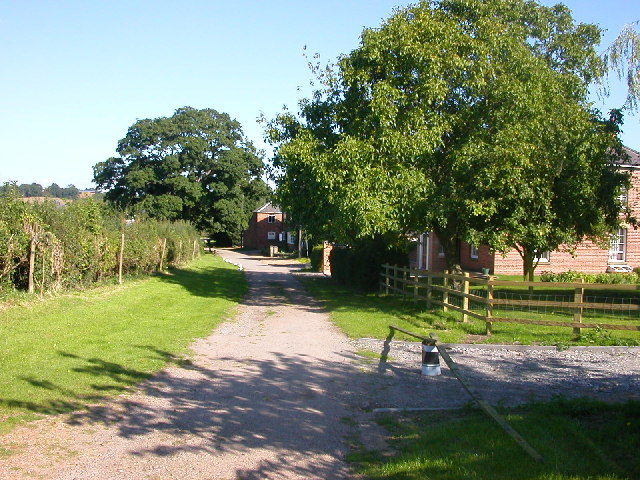
Main Street, Cosford.

Cosford is a small hamlet and civil parish in the Rugby borough of Warwickshire, England. it is located 2,1/2 miles north of Rugby, just west of the River Swift, a tributary of the River Avon, and slightly south of the M6 Motorway. It has been a civil parish since 1866. It was formerly part of the parish of Newbold-on-Avon. In the 2021 census the parish had a population of 24.

Cosford is a shrunken medieval village and earthworks are still visible of the former buildings, which have been listed as a scheduled monument since 1970. The village was not mentioned specifically in the Domesday Book. A chapel is believed to have existed in the village, but its exact location is not known. The still existing hamlet of Cosford consists of a single street with a few houses and farmsteads around Cosford Hall Farm.
