= Stretton Baskerville =

Warwickshire medieval village

Coordinates: 52.51617°N 1.38251°W

Stretton Baskerville is a deserted medieval village and civil parish in the English county of Warwickshire. It shares a parish council with the nearby parish of Burton Hastings. Stretton means "settlement on a Roman Road" (from the Old English stræt and tun). In this case the road is Watling Street.
