= Withybrook =

Village in Warwickshire, England

Coordinates: 52.45314°N 1.36279°W

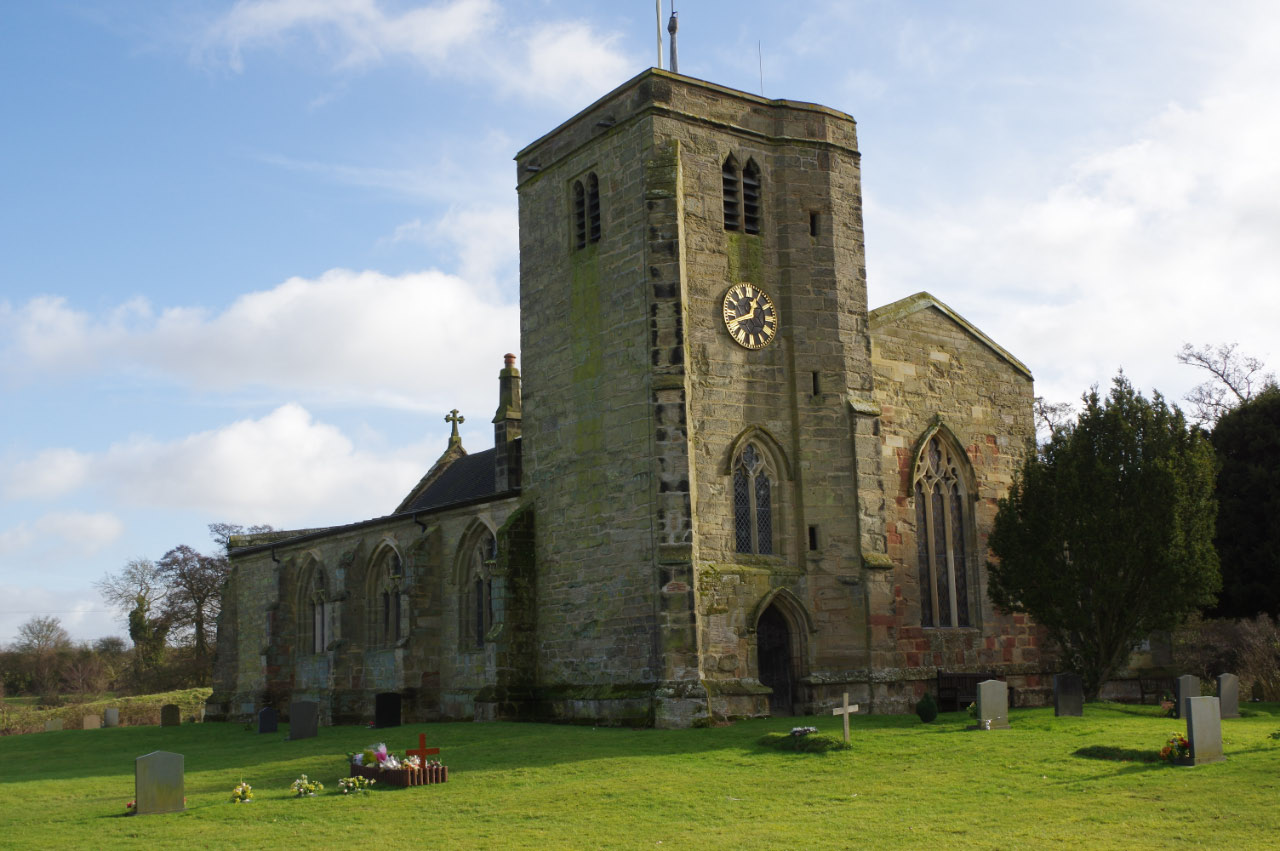
- All Saints' Church, Withybrook

- Location within Warwickshire
- Population: 255 (2021)
- OS grid reference: SP434841
- Civil parish: Withybrook
- District: Rugby
- Shire county: Warwickshire
- Region: West Midlands
- Country: England
- Sovereign state: United Kingdom
- Post town: COVENTRY
- Postcode district: CV7
- Dialling code: 01455
- Police: Warwickshire
- Fire: Warwickshire
- Ambulance: West Midlands
- UK Parliament: Rugby

Withybrook is a rural village and civil parish in the English county of Warwickshire. Its population was 255 at the 2021 census, increased slightly from 242 at the 2011 census.

The village is located in a valley of a small brook, which is a tributary of the River Sowe. It sits just west of the old Fosse Way, about halfway between Nuneaton and Rugby on the B4112 road, and about 7 miles (11 km) north-east of Coventry. Administratively it forms part of the borough of Rugby.

The grade II* listed, village church of All Saints, dates from the 14th century. It was extensively restored in 1995. There is a pub in the village called The Pheasant. The village hall has a varied programme of social events throughout the year.

About one mile west of the village, is the deserted medieval village of Hopsford.

The village came to the attention of the national news in August 2005, when a local farmer Michael Boffey was killed by car thieves who were trying to steal his Land Rover. Two men from Leicester were later convicted of his manslaughter.
