= List of Sites of Special Scientific Interest in Warwickshire =

This is a list of the Sites of Special Scientific Interest (SSSIs) in Warwickshire. English Nature, the designating body for SSSIs in England, uses the 1974–1996 county system. The majority of these sites are locally managed by the Warwickshire Wildlife Trust.

For other counties, see List of SSSIs by Area of Search.

== Sites ==
- Ailstone Old Gravel Pit
- Alvecote Pools
- Aston Grove & Withycombe Wood
- Bannam's Wood
- Bentley Park Wood
- Birches Barn Meadows
- Boon's Quarry
- Brandon Marsh
- Brook Meadow, Darley Green
- Broom Railway Cutting
- Calcutt Locks Meadows
- Clowes Wood & New Fallings Coppice
- Coleshill and Bannerly Pools
- Combe Pool
- Copmill Hill
- Coten End Quarry
- Cross Hands Quarry
- Draycote Meadows
- Drybank Meadow, Cherington
- Ensor's Pool
- Griff Hill Quarry
- Guy's Cliffe SSSI
- Harbury Quarries
- Harbury Railway Cutting
- High Close Farm, Snitterfield
- Hoar Park Wood
- Illing's Trenches
- Kingsbury Brickworks
- Kingsbury Wood
- Knavenhill Wood
- Lobbington Hall Farm Meadow
- Long Itchington & Ufton Woods
- Loxley Church Meadow
- Merriman's Hill Farm Meadows
- Middleton Pool
- Midsummer Meadow
- Napton Hill Quarry
- Oak Tree Farm Meadows
- Oxhouse Farm
- Racecourse Meadow
- Railway Meadow, Langley
- River Blythe
- River Itchen
- Rough Hill & Wirehill Woods
- Ryton and Brandon Gravel Pits
- Ryton Wood
- Sherbourne Meadows
- Shrewley Canal Cutting
- Snitterfield and Bearley Bushes
- Stockton Railway Cutting and Quarry
- Stretton-on-Fosse Pit
- Ufton Fields
- Ullenhall Meadows
- Waverley Wood Farm
- Welford Field
- Whichford Wood
- Whitacre Heath SSSI
- Wilmcote Quarry
- Windmill Naps Wood
- Wolford Wood and Old Covert
- Wolston Gravel Pit
- Woodlands Quarry
