= Brandon and Bretford =

Civil parish in Warwickshire, England

Coordinates: 52.389°N 1.386°W

Brandon and Bretford is a civil parish in the Rugby borough of Warwickshire, England. It contains the village of Brandon and the smaller hamlet of Bretford. Both are within 1½ miles of each other, along the A428 road. In the 2001 Census the parish had a population of 588, increasing to 643 at the 2011 Census, and again to 675 at the 2021 census.

The parish is long and narrow in shape, and extends from Bretford to the border with Coventry, it covers Brandon Marsh as well as Brandon Wood. The River Avon crosses the parish, as does the Rugby–Birmingham–Stafford Line, which crosses the Avon on a viaduct. west of this, Brandon and Wolston railway station operated here until 1960.

The area was historically part of the parish of Wolston. Brandon and Bretford became a separate civil parish in 1866.
