= LeCount =

LeCount or Lecount is a surname. Notable people with the name include:

- Caroline LeCount (c. 1846–1923), American civil rights activist
- Erin LeCount (born 2003), English singer-songwriter
- Terry LeCount (born 1956), American football player
- Peter Lecount (1784–1852), British Royal Navy officer
