= Brandon Marsh =

Brandon Marsh may refer to:

- Brandon Marsh (baseball), American professional baseball outfielder
- Brandon Marsh nature reserve, nature reserve located in England
