= Wolston =

Village in Warwickshire, England

Coordinates: 52.376272°N 1.395133°W

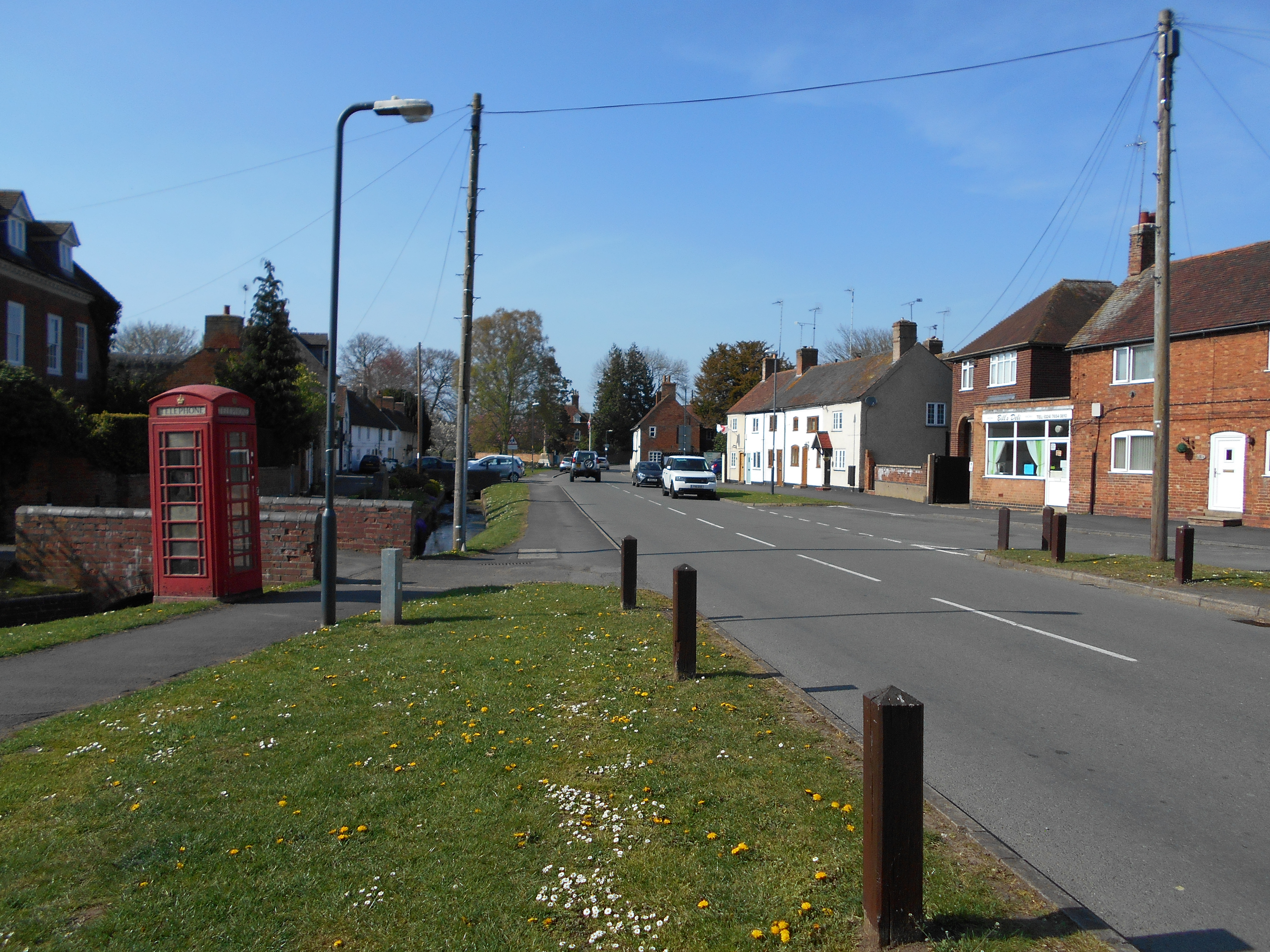
- Main Street, Wolston

- Location within Warwickshire
- Population: 2,692 (2021)
- OS grid reference: SP422748
- District: Rugby
- Shire county: Warwickshire
- Region: West Midlands
- Country: England
- Sovereign state: United Kingdom
- Post town: COVENTRY
- Postcode district: CV8
- Dialling code: 024
- Police: Warwickshire
- Fire: Warwickshire
- Ambulance: West Midlands
- UK Parliament: Rugby
- Website: http://www.wolstonvillage.co.uk

Wolston is a village and civil parish in the Rugby borough of Warwickshire, England. The village is located approximately midway between Rugby and Coventry, with a population of 2,692 at the 2021 census. It is close to the A45 road and the Roman road the Fosse Way.

The River Avon flows through the village. Near the river are the remains of a Norman motte-and-bailey castle, Brandon Castle. A Benedictine priory, Wolston Priory, was sited to the east of the village and its earthwork remains are now a Scheduled Ancient Monument. The village has two churches: the parish church of St Margaret's and Wolston Baptist Church.

Wolston was mentioned in the Domesday Book as "Vivricetone" and "Vivestone". The ancient parish of Wolston was large, and included Wolston itself, plus the nearby villages of Brandon and Bretford to the north, and Stretton-on-Dunsmore and Princethorpe to the south. The latter two became a separate parish in 1696, whilst Brandon and Bretford became a separate civil parish in 1866.

Wolston once had a railway station, Brandon and Wolston railway station on the Rugby-Coventry line, but this was closed in 1960. One of the most notable features in the village is the railway viaduct crossing the Avon, which dates from the 1830s and was part of the original London and Birmingham Railway. The viaduct separates Wolston from the smaller village of Brandon. The two shared a football team "Brandon & Wolston Football Club". They no longer have a senior men's team but they still run a junior club.

The village contains a primary school (Wolston St Margarets Primary C of E School). St Margaret's Primary was originally in School Street, but that building is now used as offices. Until 1991, there was also a secondary school, known as Wolston High School, its site was sold off for housing and a community centre. Wolston has a small library, two pubs (The Rose & Crown & The Half Moon), a convenience store, a pharmacy and a local doctors surgery.

In geology, the village gives its name to the Wolstonian Stage, a British regional subdivision of the Pleistocene Epoch.

== Notable people ==
- William Rose (1842–1917), cricketer
