= Brandon, Warwickshire =

Village in Warwickshire, England

Coordinates: 52.383590°N 1.399518°W

Brandon
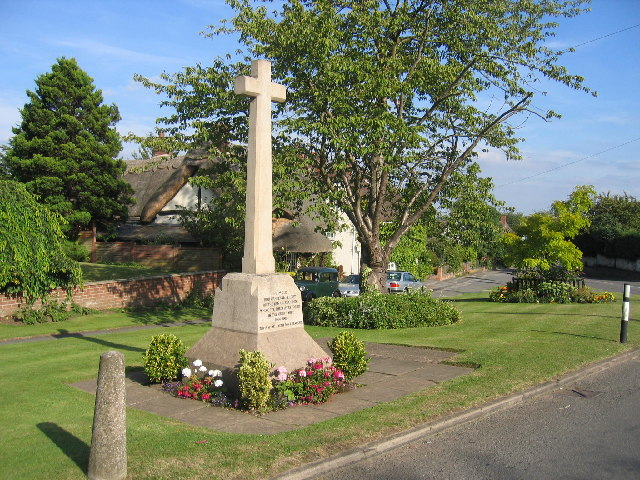
- War Memorial and cottages on Rugby Road, Brandon

- Location within Warwickshire
- Population: 500 approx
- OS grid reference: SP4076
- Civil parish: Brandon and Bretford
- District: Rugby
- Shire county: Warwickshire
- Region: West Midlands
- Country: England
- Sovereign state: United Kingdom
- Post town: COVENTRY
- Postcode district: CV8
- Dialling code: 024
- Police: Warwickshire
- Fire: Warwickshire
- Ambulance: West Midlands
- UK Parliament: Rugby

Brandon is a small village in Warwickshire, England. Along with nearby Bretford, it forms part of a joint civil parish of Brandon and Bretford. Administratively it is part of the Borough of Rugby. The River Avon passes just to the east of the village. Brandon is located upon the A428 road between Coventry, 5 miles (8.0 km) to the west, and Rugby, 6 miles (9.7 km) to the east. Just 1.5 miles (2.4 km) west of Brandon is the suburban village of Binley Woods and 1.5 miles (2.4 km) to the east is the hamlet of Bretford.

Brandon is separated from the much larger village of Wolston by a railway viaduct, but the two villages practically form a single entity. The railway viaduct dates from 1837 and was part of the original London and Birmingham Railway, which is now part of the Rugby–Birmingham–Stafford Line, which runs across the parish; Brandon and Wolston railway station operated here until 1960.

The village contains a number of old cottages and has a pub near the railway line. Just to the north of the village is Brandon Stadium, also known as the Coventry Stadium, which was used for speedway racing, greyhound racing, and stock car racing before being sold with the intention of housebuilding on the site. The stadium was home to the Coventry Bees speedway team. West of the village is Brandon Marsh, a 228-acre (0.92 km^{2}) nature reserve with a wide variety of wildlife, especially pondlife. The reserve's visitor centre was opened in 1998 by Sir David Attenborough. Also to the west and north of Brandon Marsh is Brandon Wood, a community woodland owned and managed by a local group the Friends Of Brandon Wood.

A grassy mound marks the remains of Brandon Castle, which is found to the south of the village. The castle was built in the 12th century by the de Verdon family. It was garrisoned in 1195, but was relatively short lived, as it was said to have been ‘pulled down’ in 1265 by the baronial troops from Kenilworth Castle, because John de Verdon was an active supporter of the king.
