= William Rose (cricketer, born 1842) =

English cricketer (1842–1917)

Personal information
- Full name: William Molyneux Rose
- Born: 20 September 1842; Wolston, Warwickshire, England
- Died: 13 January 1917 (aged 74); Wolston, Warwickshire, England
- Nickname: Billy the blue-blooded buck
- Batting: Right-handed
- Bowling: Right-arm slow

Domestic team information
- Years: Team
- 1867: Marylebone Cricket Club

Career statistics
Competition	First-class
Matches	7
Runs scored	35
Batting average	4.37
100s/50s	–/–
Top score	9
Balls bowled	512
Wickets	23
Bowling average	9.52
5 wickets in innings	2
10 wickets in match	1
Best bowling	8/71
Catches/stumpings	10/–
- Source: Cricinfo, 9 September 2019

William Molyneux Rose (20 September 1842 – 13 January 1917) was an English first-class cricketer.

Rose was born in September 1842 at Wolston, Warwickshire. He was educated at Eton College. After leaving Eton, Rose purchased the rank of ensign in the 32nd Foot in July 1860. He resigned his commission in May 1865. He made his debut in first-class cricket for the Gentlemen of Marylebone Cricket Club against the Professionals of Marylebone Cricket Club at Lord's in 1867. He made three further first-class appearances in 1867, playing for the Marylebone Cricket Club against Surrey, for the South of the Thames in the North of the Thames v South of the Thames fixture, and once more for the Gentlemen of Marylebone Cricket Club against Kent. He made his next first-class appearance in 1870 for the Gentlemen of Marylebone Cricket Club against Kent, before making two first-class appearances in 1871, with Rose appearing for the North in the North v South fixture, and for the Gentlemen of Marylebone Cricket Club against Kent. A right-arm slow lob bowler, he took 23 wickets at an average of 9.52, with best figures of 8 for 71, which was one of two five wicket hauls he took in first-class cricket, alongside taking ten wickets in a match once. Rose died at Wolston in January 1917.
