= London and Birmingham Railway =

Early British railway company (1837–1846)

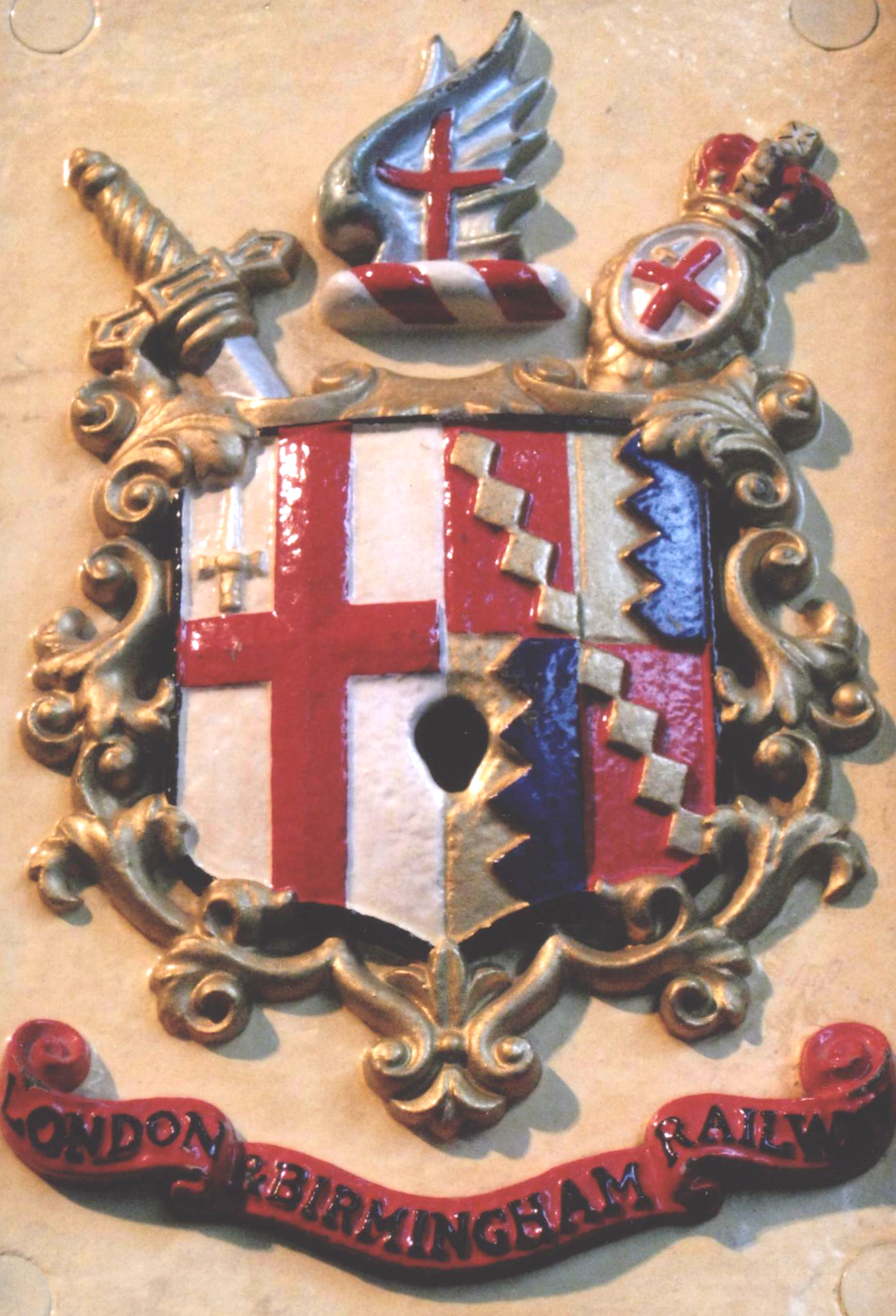
- London and Birmingham Railway coat of arms on the original Euston station gates displayed at the National Railway Museum in York

Overview
- Dates of operation: 1833–1846
- Successor: London and North Western Railway

Technical
- Track gauge: 4 ft 8 1/2 in (1,435 mm) standard gauge

The London and Birmingham Railway (L&BR) was a railway company in the United Kingdom, in operation from 1833 to 1846, when it became part of the London and North Western Railway (L&NWR).

The 112-mile (180 km) railway line which the company opened in 1838, between London and Birmingham, was the first intercity line to be built into London. It is now the southern section of the West Coast Main Line.

The line was engineered by Robert Stephenson. It started at Euston Station in London, went north-west to Rugby, where it turned west to Coventry and on to Birmingham. It terminated at Curzon Street Station, which it shared with the Grand Junction Railway (GJR), whose adjacent platforms gave an interchange with full connectivity (with through carriages) between Liverpool, Manchester and London.

== History ==
=== Early plans ===
As early as 1823, a company was formed with the objective of building a railway between London and Birmingham, and in 1826, the engineer John Rennie surveyed a route through Oxford and Banbury, a route later taken by the Great Western Railway.

In 1829 a rival company was formed by Francis Giles who proposed building a line through Watford Gap and Coventry. Neither company obtained backing for its scheme, and in late 1830 the two companies decided to merge. The new company appointed Robert Stephenson chief engineer, and after preparing a detailed survey, he chose the route through Watford Gap, largely to avoid possible flooding from the River Thames at Oxford.

=== The L&BR ===
The prospectus for the London and Birmingham Railway offered the following inducements to potential investors:

First, the opening of new and distant sources of supply of provisions to the metropolis; Second, Easy, cheap and expeditious travelling; Third; The rapid and economical interchange of the great articles of consumption and of commerce, both internal and external; and Lastly, the connexion by railways, of London with Liverpool, the rich pastures of the centre of England, and the greatest manufacturing districts; and, through the port of Liverpool, to afford a most expeditious communication with Ireland.

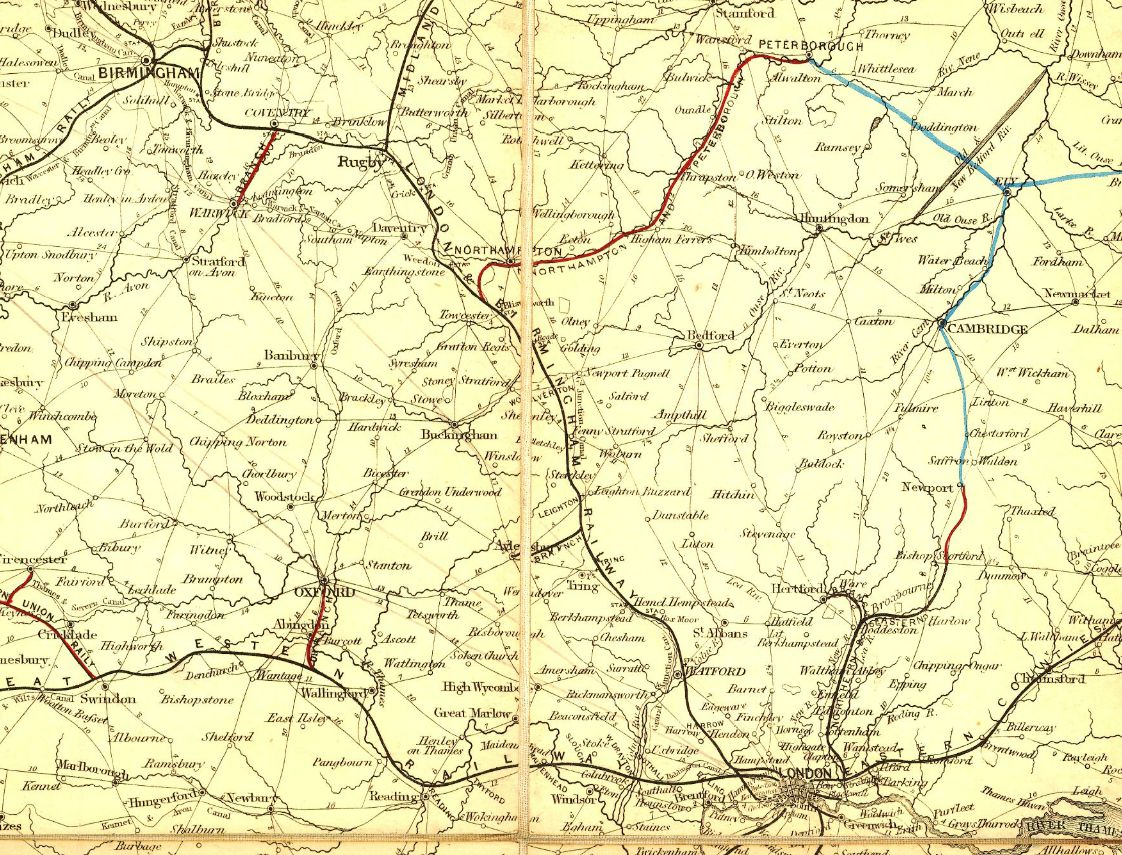
Cheffin's map - Route of London and Birmingham Railway, 1850

The company was created with an initial capitalisation of £5,500,000. (Note: About £54,300,000 today) Much of the subscribed funds came from Lancashire, where great profits were being made in the cotton industries.

The construction of the line was the subject of much opposition by landowners, who organised a campaign in the early 1830s to prevent the L&BR from driving a line across their estates. Turbulent public meetings were held in towns in west Hertfordshire to protest against the project, including one held at the King's Arms public house in Berkhamsted. Another was held in Watford which was attended by wealthy and influential peers of the realm who had property interests on the planned route of the line: the Earl of Essex was keen to protect his Cassiobury Estate from invasion by the "iron horse", as was the Earl of Clarendon, who owned The Grove Estate. The anatomist Sir Astley Cooper was also in attendance, intent on preventing the new railway from cutting across his Gadebridge Estate. On 22 June 1832, Lord Brownlow of Ashridge voiced his opposition in the House of Lords to "the forcing of the proposed railway through the land and property of so great a proportion of dissentient landowners." The L&BR company's first application for an act of Parliament to construct the line was rejected in 1832, due to pressure from landowners and road and canal interests.

London and Birmingham Railway Act 1833
- Act of Parliament
- Parliament of the United Kingdom
- Long title: An Act for making a Railway from London to Birmingham.
- Citation: 3 & 4 Will. 4. c. xxxvi

Dates
- Royal assent: 6 May 1833

Other legislation
- Repealed by: London and North Western Railway Act 1846

Status: Repealed

Text of statute as originally enacted

London and Birmingham Railway Act 1835
- Act of Parliament
- Parliament of the United Kingdom
- Long title: An Act to enable the London and Birmingham Railway Company to extend and alter the Line of such Railway, and for other Purposes relating thereto.
- Citation: 5 & 6 Will. 4. c. lvi

Dates
- Royal assent: 3 July 1835

Other legislation
- Repealed by: London and North Western Railway Act 1846

Status: Repealed

London and Birmingham Railway Act 1837
- Act of Parliament
- Parliament of the United Kingdom
- Long title: An Act to amend the Acts relating to the London and Birmingham Railway.
- Citation: 7 Will. 4 & 1 Vict. c. lxiv

Dates
- Royal assent: 30 June 1837

Other legislation
- Repealed by: London and North Western Railway Act 1846

Status: Repealed

London and Birmingham Railway Act 1839
- Act of Parliament
- Parliament of the United Kingdom
- Long title: An Act to enable the London and Birmingham Railway Company to raise a further Sum of Money.
- Citation: 2 & 3 Vict. c. xxxix

Dates
- Royal assent: 14 June 1839

Other legislation
- Repealed by: London and North Western Railway Act 1846

Status: Repealed

Text of statute as originally enacted

The railway route proposals through Hertfordshire were modified; a second parliamentary bill was approved in May 1833 as the London and Birmingham Railway Act 1833 (3 & 4 Will. 4. c. xxxvi), and the line received royal assent. Construction began in November of that year. The line would follow the River Bulbourne instead of the River Gade, skirting around the edge of Hemel Hempstead to protect Sir Astley Cooper's interests; for this reason, Hemel Hempstead railway station is located one mile (1.6 km) outside the town centre, at Boxmoor.

=== Construction ===
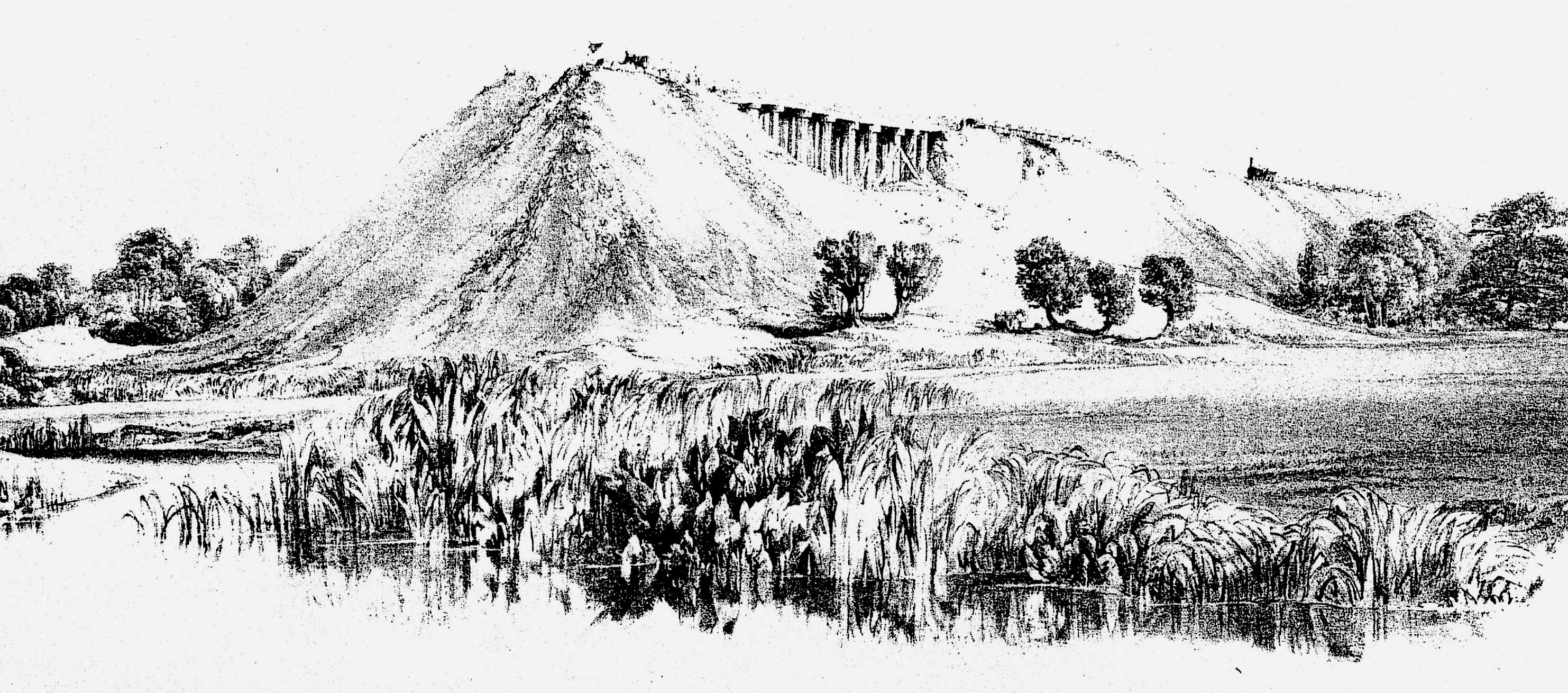
Making the embankment - Wolverton Valley (Great Ouse), 28 June 1837

Peter Lecount, an assistant engineer of the London and Birmingham railway, produced a number of – possibly hyperbolic – comparisons in an effort to demonstrate that the London and Birmingham Railway was "the greatest public work ever executed either in ancient or modern times". In particular, he suggested that the effort to build the Great Pyramid of Giza amounted to the lifting of 15,733,000,000 cu ft (445,500,000 m^{3}) of stone by 1 foot (0.305 m).

The railway, excluding a long string of tasks (drainage, ballasting, and so on) involved the lifting of 25,000,000,000 cu ft (710,000,000 m^{3}) of material reduced to the weight of stone used in the pyramid. The pyramid involved, he says, the effort of 300,000 men (according to Diodorus Siculus) or 100,000 (according to Herodotus) for twenty years. The railway involved 20,000 men for five years. In passing, he also noted that the cost of the railway in penny pieces, was enough to more than form a belt of pennies around the equator; and the amount of material moved would be enough to build a wall 1 foot (305 mm) high by one foot wide, more than three times around the equator.

=== Opening ===
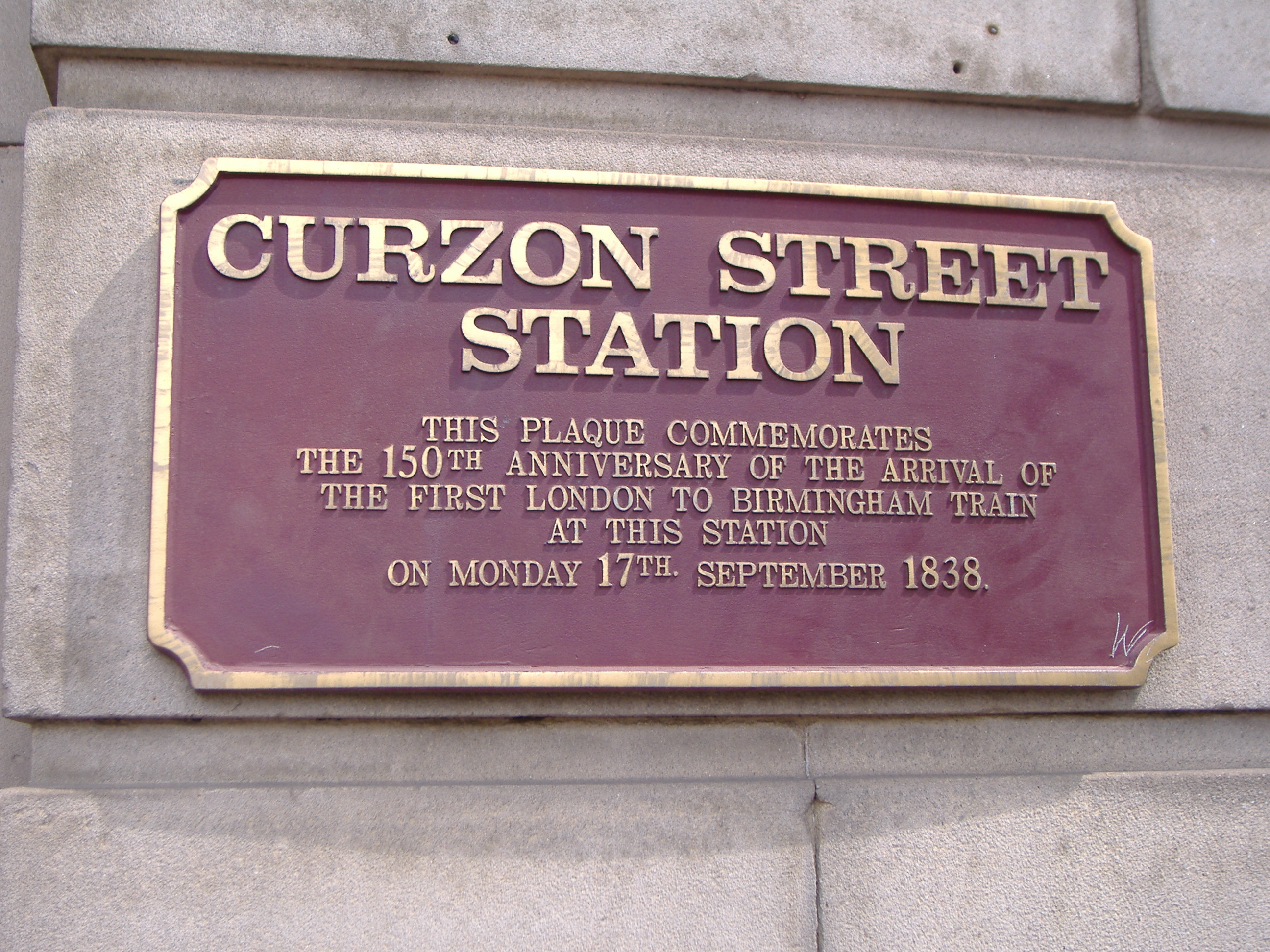
Plaque at Curzon Street station commemorating the arrival of the first train from London to Birmingham

The line had been planned to open at the same time as the Grand Junction Railway which entered Birmingham from the north. However great difficulty in constructing the Kilsby Tunnel in Northamptonshire delayed the opening. The first part of the line between Euston Station and Boxmoor (Hemel Hempstead) opened on 20 July 1837. Services were extended to Tring on 16 October 1837. On 9 April 1838 the company opened the north end of the line, between Birmingham and Rugby, and the south end from London to a temporary station at Denbigh Hall near Bletchley with horse-drawn coaches and omnibuses linking the two parts. The line was officially fully opened on 17 September 1838, with the first passenger train from London to Birmingham arriving that day. The first London-to-Birmingham trains took 5 1/2 hours to complete the 112 1/2-mile (181.1 km) journey.

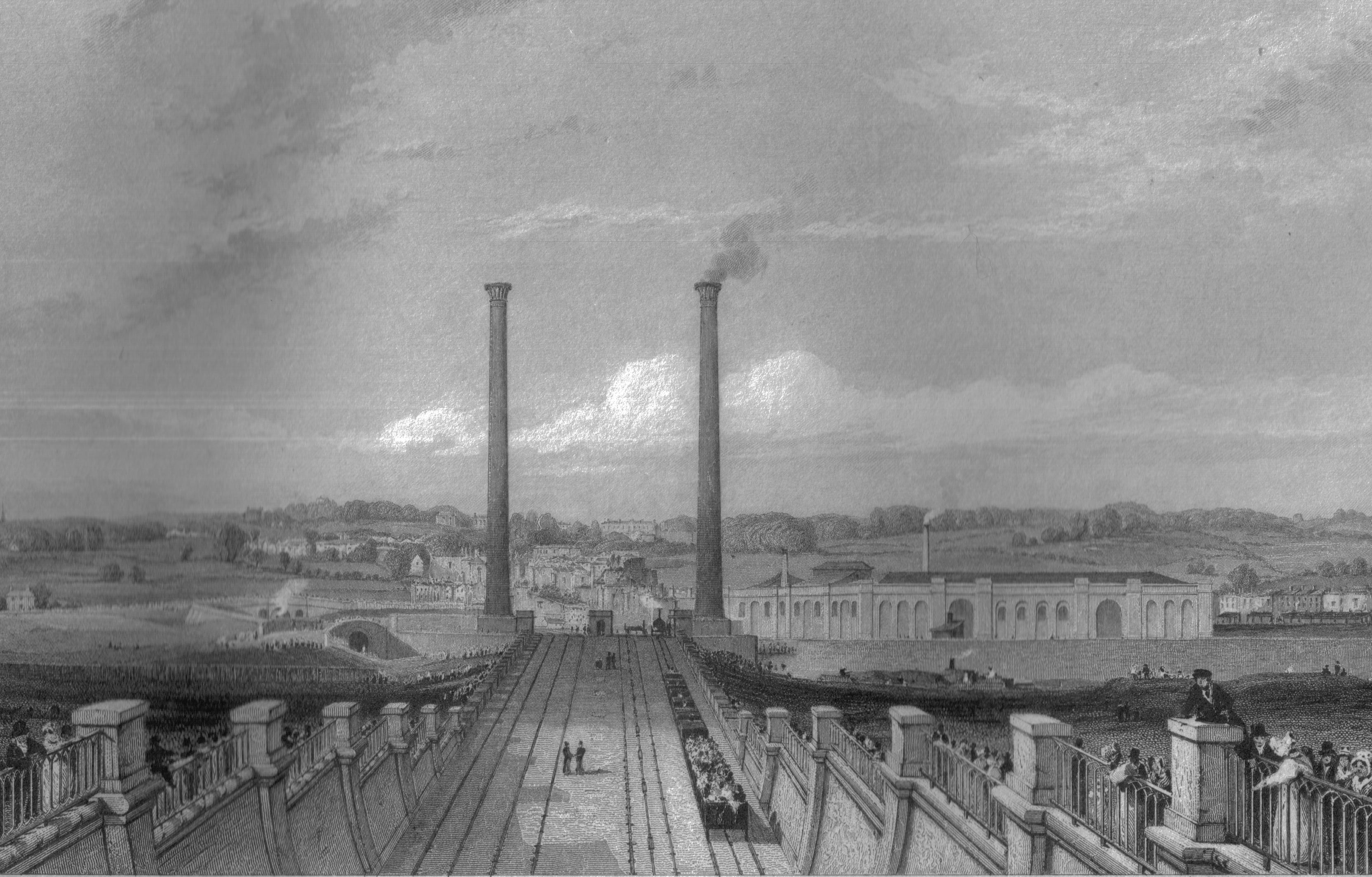
Camden Town stationary steam engine chimneys and locomotive workshops in 1838

It has often been claimed that initially, owing to the lack of power available to early locomotives, trains from Euston were cable-hauled up the relatively steep incline to Camden by a stationary steam engine. However, this was denied by Peter Lecount, one of the L&BR engineers, who wrote in his 'History of the Railway connecting London and Birmingham' (1839), page 48: "It is not because locomotives cannot draw a train of carriages up this incline that a fixed engine and endless rope are used, for they can and have done so, but because the Company are restricted, by their Act of Parliament, from running locomotive engines nearer London than Camden Town." The railway opened from Euston on 20 July 1837; the stationary engines and rope haulage did not commence until 27 September, and handled all trains from 14 October 1837. Until then, and whenever the rope system was stopped for repairs, locomotives hauled the trains up the incline. From November 1843 some expresses were worked without recourse to the rope, and from 15 July 1844 the rope working ceased permanently.

=== Locomotives ===
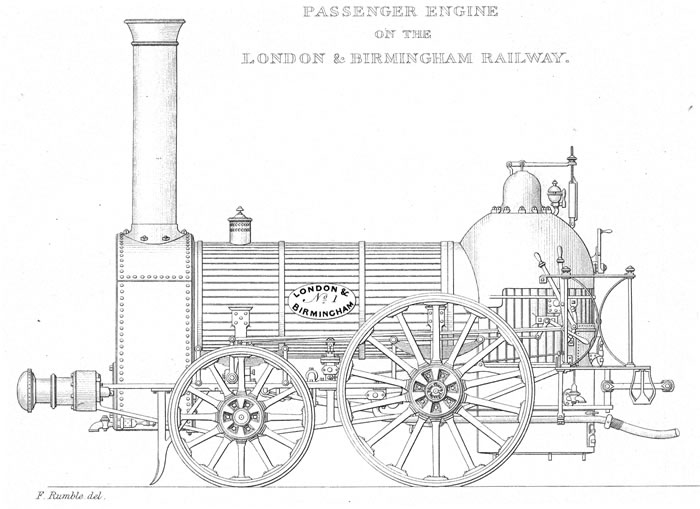
An early L&BR Bury 2-2-0 passenger locomotive

Initially, it was decided that it would be cheaper to work the railway by a contractor, and Edward Bury was chosen and awarded the contract in May 1836. The contract stipulated that the company would provide locomotives to Bury's specification, while he would maintain them in good repair and convey each passenger and each ton of goods for a fixed sum at a speed not to exceed 22 1/2 miles per hour (36.2 km/h).

Bury provided specifications and drawings for a passenger and a goods engine, and by mid-1841 the L&BR was equipped with sixty 2-2-0 passenger engines and thirty 0-4-0 goods engines. They all had inside cylinders and dome-topped fireboxes, and were mounted on inside bar-frames; they were manufactured by seven different firms, including Bury's own.

Working the line by contract never worked in practice, because of the unforeseen ever-increasing traffic and the demand for higher speeds, so in July 1839 the contract was annulled, and thereafter Bury was engaged as manager of the Locomotive Department in the normal way, on a fixed salary with a profits bonus.

By the end of the L&BR's separate existence in July 1846, the total stock was about 120 locomotives; some six-wheeled engines had been acquired, but some of these proved inferior to the original four-wheelers.

The locomotive workshops were established in 1838 at Wolverton, roughly halfway between the two termini at London and Birmingham. These workshops remained in use for locomotive repairs until 1877, but had been gradually taken over by the Carriage Dept from 1864, and remained as a manufacturing facility up until the 1980s; today just a few parts of the original Wolverton railway works are used solely for rolling stock maintenance and repair.

=== Stations ===
When the railway was fully opened, it had sixteen intermediate stations between London and Birmingham. The "first-class" stations (served by all trains) were at Watford, Tring, Leighton, Wolverton, Blisworth, Weedon, Rugby and Coventry. Additionally, "second-class" intermediate stations (served by slower second-class trains only) were at Harrow, Boxmoor, Berkhamsted, Bletchley, Roade, Crick, Brandon and Hampton. Roade was later redesignated as first-class due to its stagecoach connections. From about 1844 platforms were opened at Camden for tickets to be collected on southbound trains. This became a public station in 1851.

=== Links and branches ===
The first branch from the main line was the Aylesbury Railway at Aylesbury Railway Junction, seven miles (11 km) of single track, which opened in 1839 and was leased to the L&BR until purchased outright by the LNWR in 1846. The Warwick and Leamington Union Railway, a branch of almost nine miles (14 km) between Coventry and Leamington, was purchased by the L&BR in 1843 and opened in 1844.

From 1840, when the Midland Counties Railway made a junction to its line at Rugby, the L&BR also provided through connections from London to the East Midlands and the North East. It also made connections to the Birmingham and Derby Junction Railway at Hampton-in-Arden between Coventry and Birmingham.

London and Birmingham Railway Act 1845
- Act of Parliament
- Parliament of the United Kingdom
- Long title: An Act for enabling the London and Birmingham Railway Company to take a Lease of the West London Railway.
- Citation: 8 & 9 Vict. c. clvi

Dates
- Royal assent: 31 July 1845

London and Birmingham Railway Act 1846
- Act of Parliament
- Parliament of the United Kingdom
- Long title: An Act to empower the London and Birmingham Railway Company to enlarge their Stations in London; and for other Purposes.
- Citation: 9 & 10 Vict. c. clii

Dates
- Royal assent: 16 July 1846

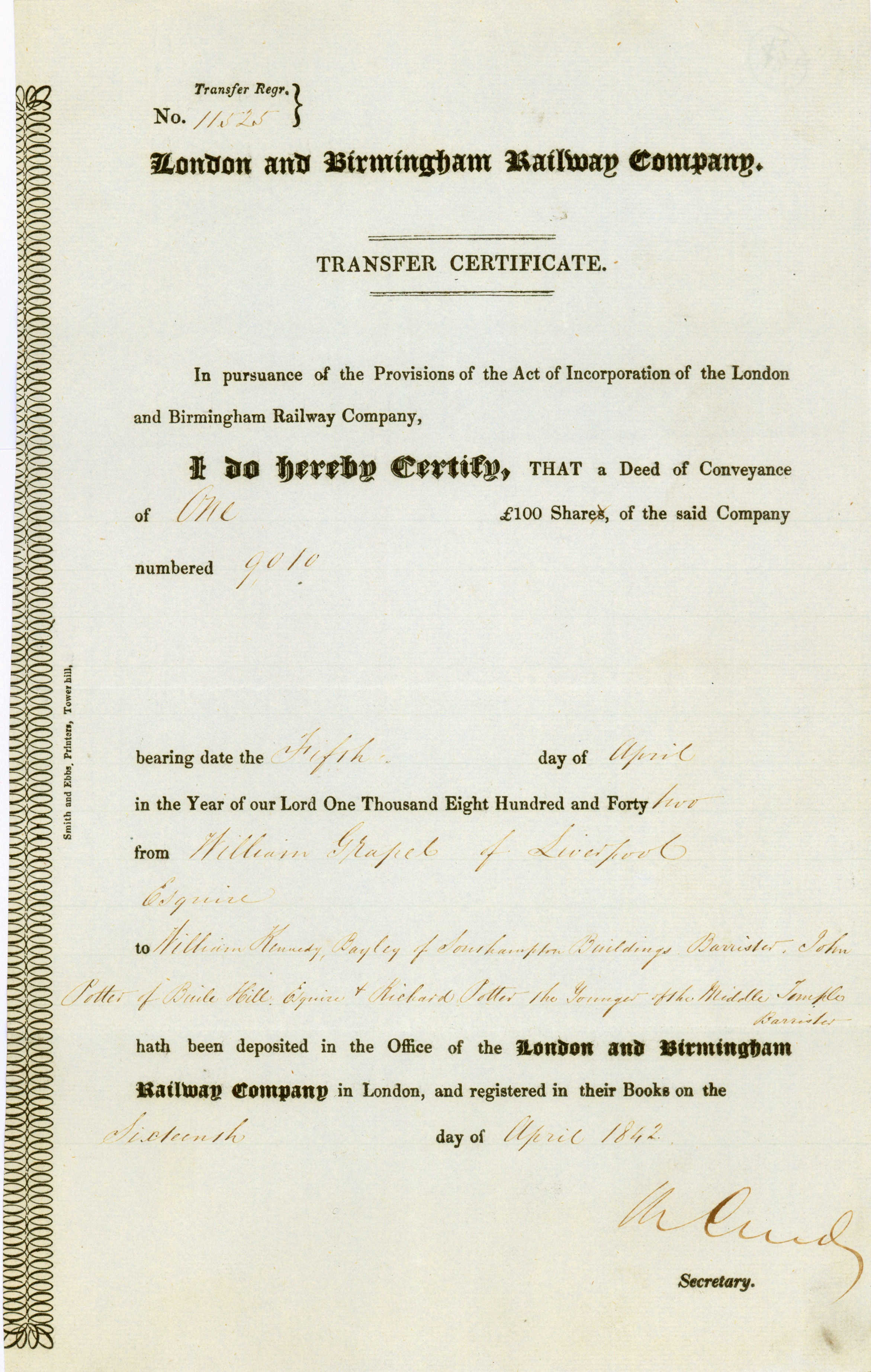
Transfer certificate of the London and Birmingham Railway Company, issued 16 April 1842

In 1845, the Northampton and Peterborough Railway, a 47-mile (76 km) branch from the main line, was opened from Blisworth. Also in 1845 branch lines, from Bletchley to Bedford and from Leighton to Dunstable, were leased; they opened in 1846 and 1848. The London and Birmingham Railway Act 1845 (8 & 9 Vict. c. clvi) authorised the L&BR to lease the West London Railway, and this took effect from 1846 (jointly with the GWR). The West London Railway has opened in 1844 between Willesden Junction and the canal basin at Kensington.

The L&BR purchased the Trent Valley Railway in 1846 on behalf of the LNWR; this fifty-mile (80 km) line connected Rugby on the L&BR with Stafford on the Grand Junction Railway thus creating a more direct line from London to Liverpool and Manchester by avoiding the original route through Birmingham. The Rugby and Stamford Railway, a further branch into the Eastern Counties was approved in 1846.

=== Merger ===
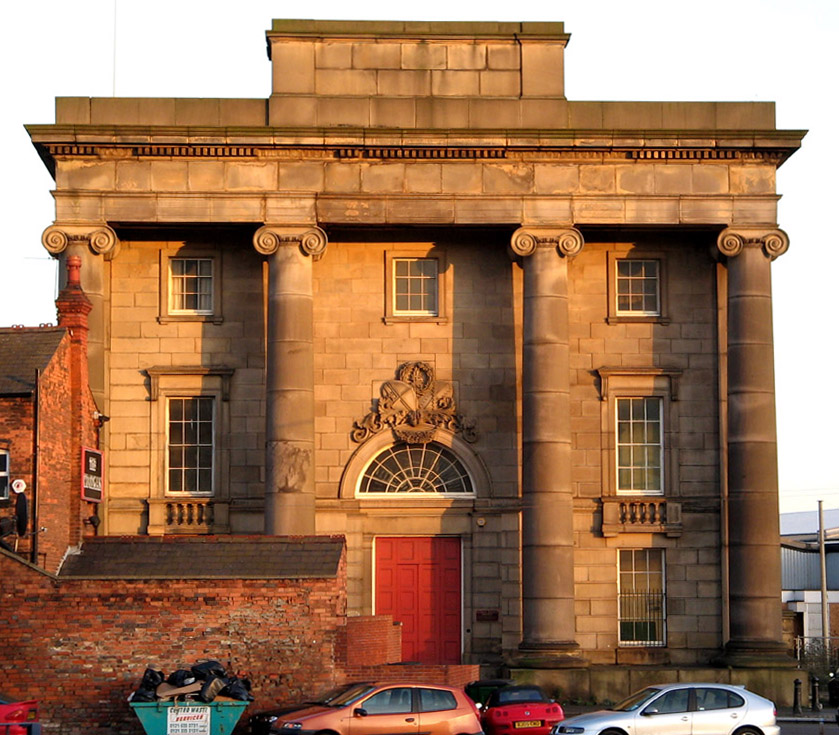
Hardwick's Curzon Street station, the Birmingham terminus of the line

In July 1846 the L&BR merged with the Grand Junction Railway and the Manchester and Birmingham Railway to form the London and North Western Railway, which in turn was later absorbed into the London Midland and Scottish Railway, before finally passing into the hands of the nationalised British Railways in 1948 to become part of the West Coast Main Line as it is known today. The major change to the line during this period was electrification, which was carried out during the mid-1960s as part of BR's Modernisation Plan.

Neither of the L&BR's original termini, both designed by Philip Hardwick, has survived in its original form. Curzon Street station in Birmingham closed to passenger traffic in 1854 (the original entrance building remains) when it was replaced by New Street station and the original Euston station in London was demolished in 1962 to make way for the present structure which opened in 1968. On the closure of Curzon Street as a passenger station, the site became the London and North Western Railway goods depot (Birmingham) and became fully operational in 1865. The Curzon Street goods site continued railway operations as a parcel depot until 1966. The remaining parts of the old passenger station received listed building status in 1952.

== London and Birmingham railway gallery for 1838 ==
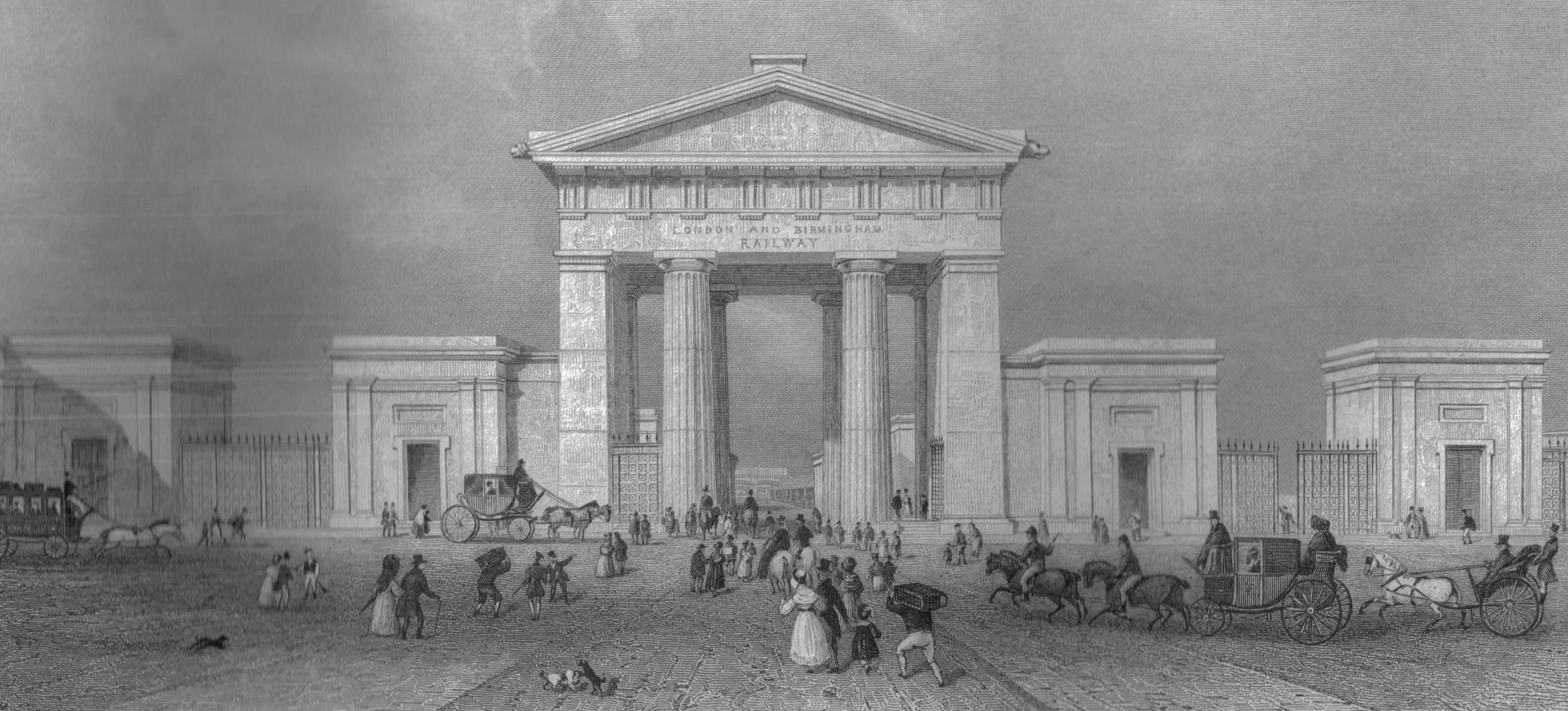
The Euston Arch and Euston station entrance by Edward Radclyffe

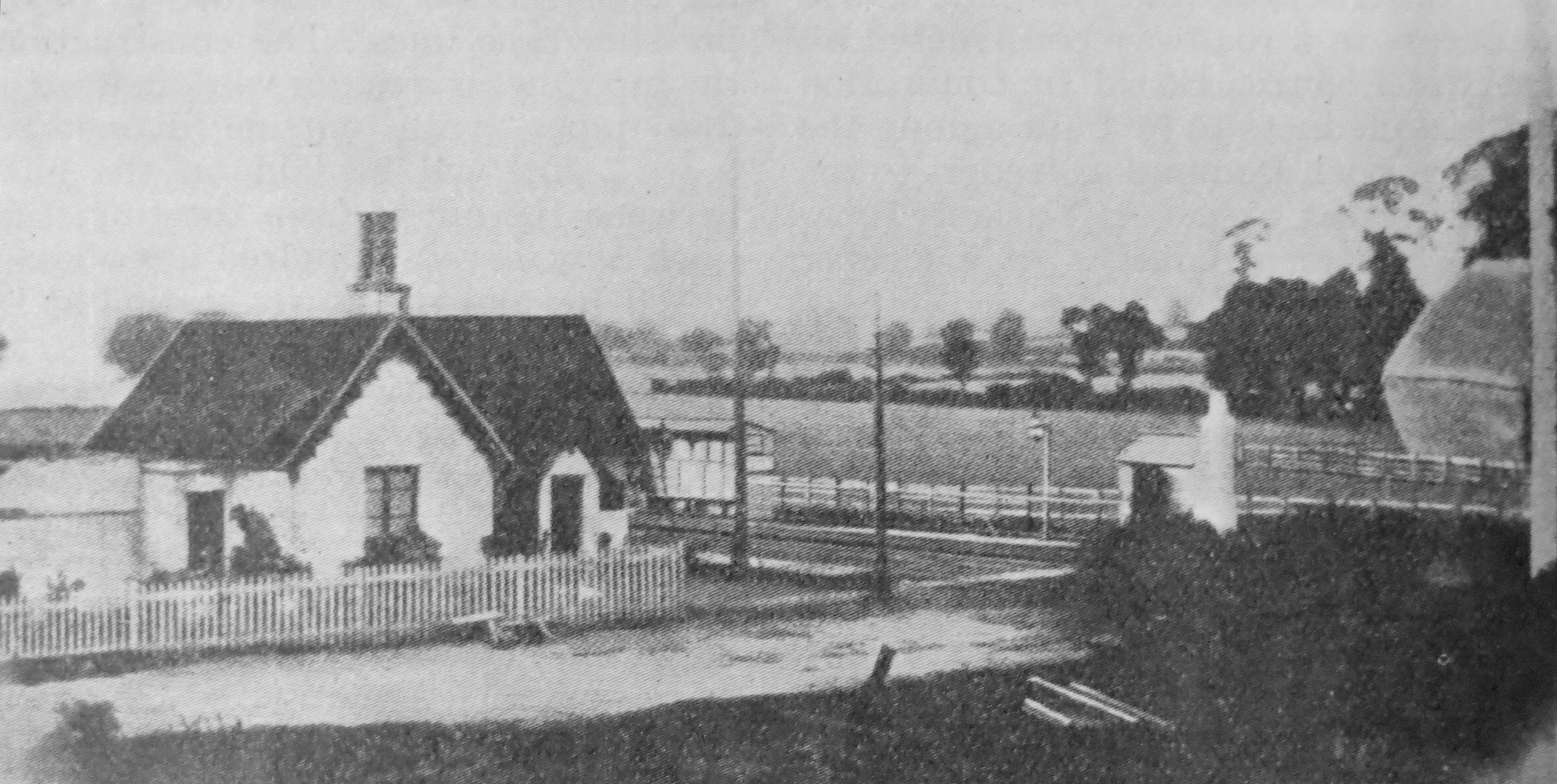
Willesden railway station (opened July 1842) and Acton Lane level crossing

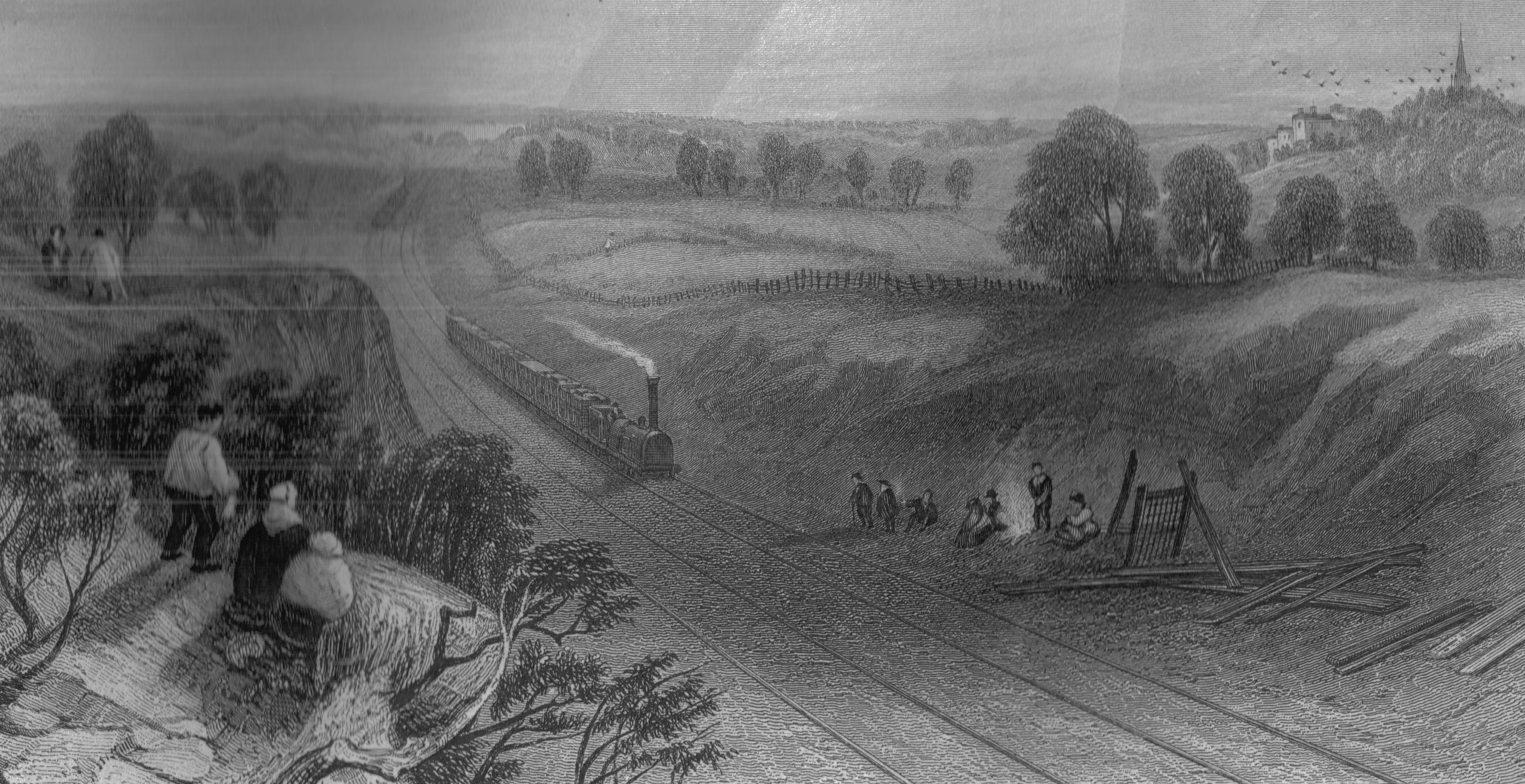
The Harrow on Hill railway cutting, 1838

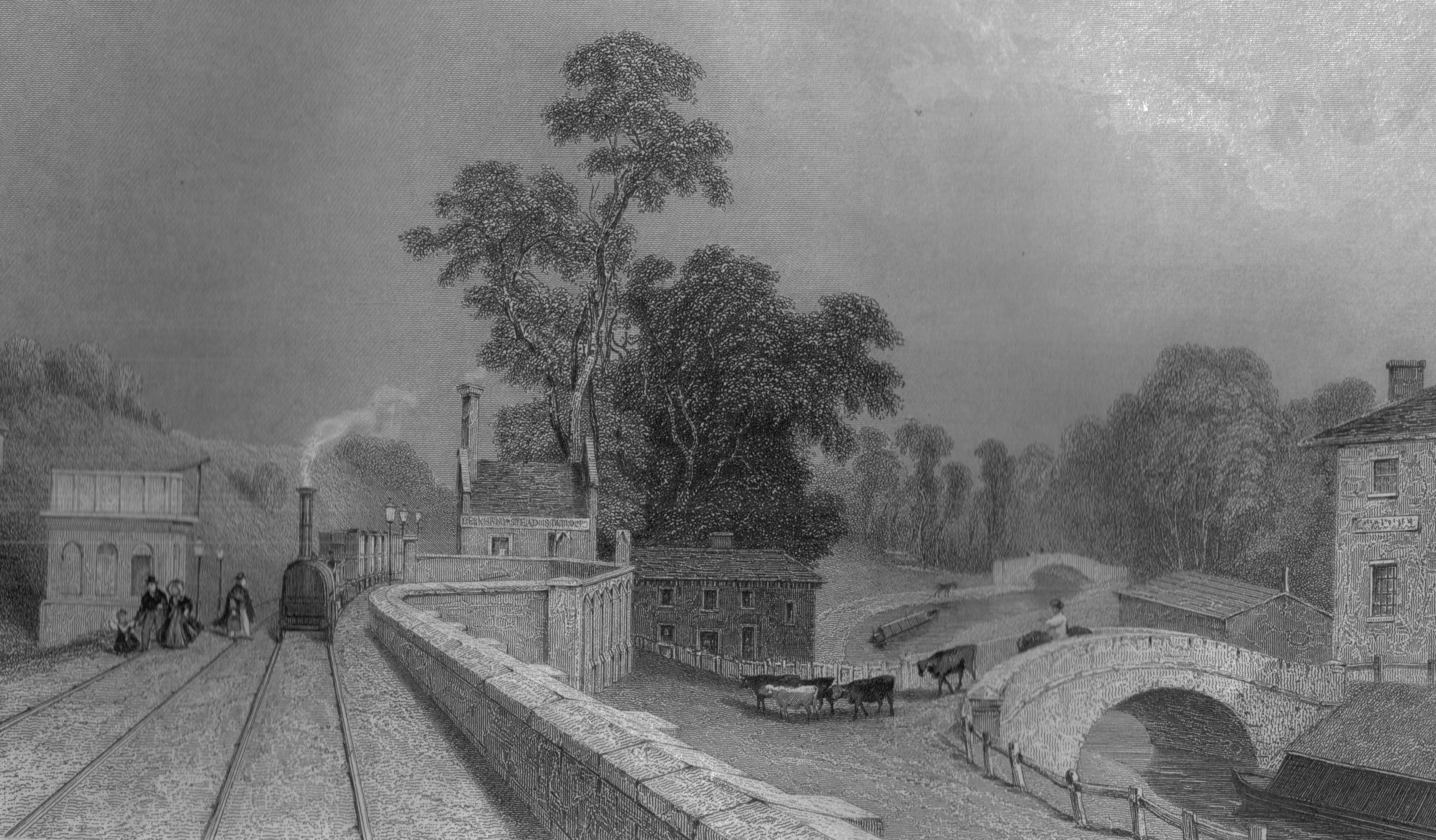
Berkhamsted railway station in 1838 with the Grand Junction Canal to the right

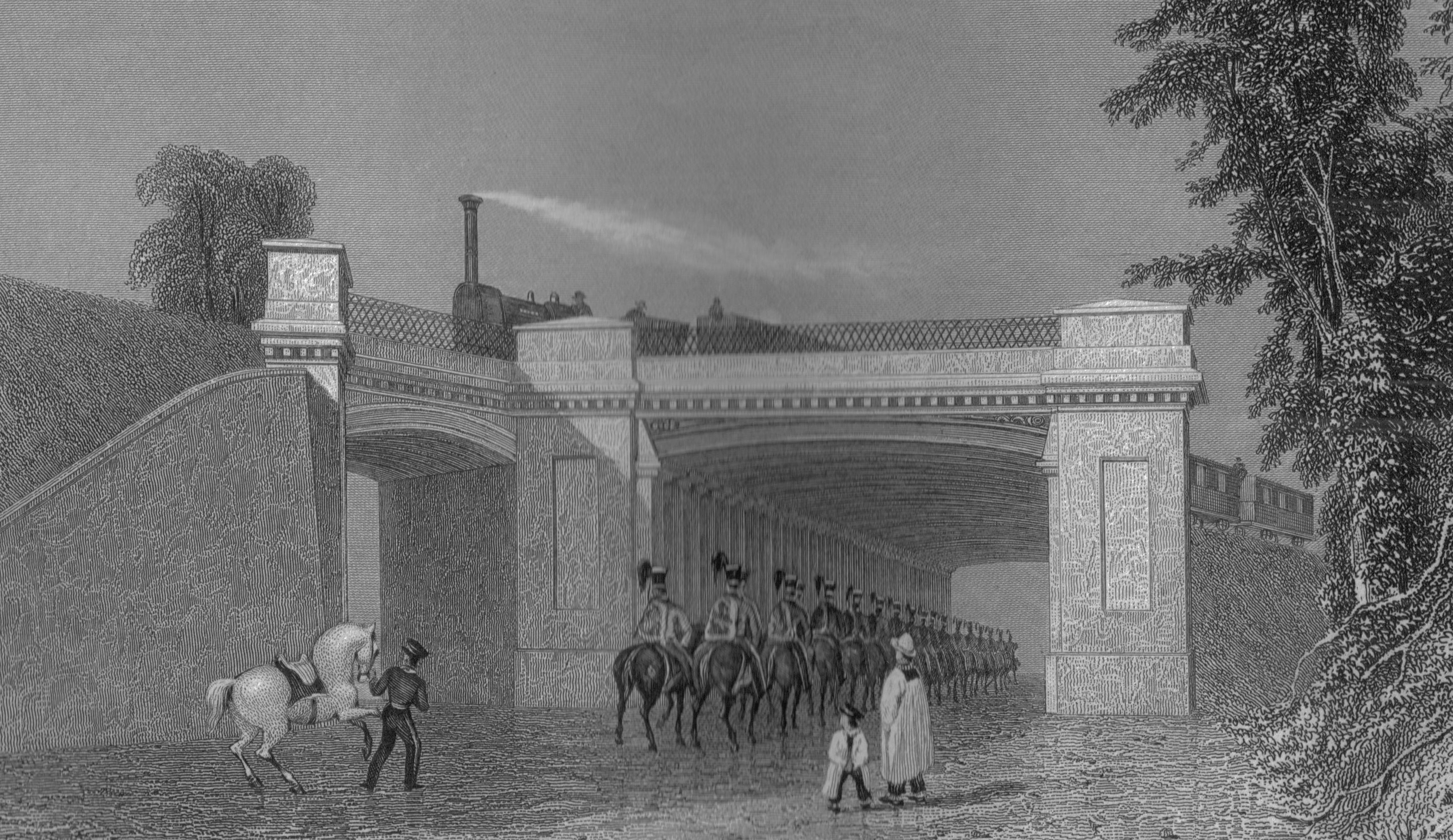
Denbigh Hall railway bridge

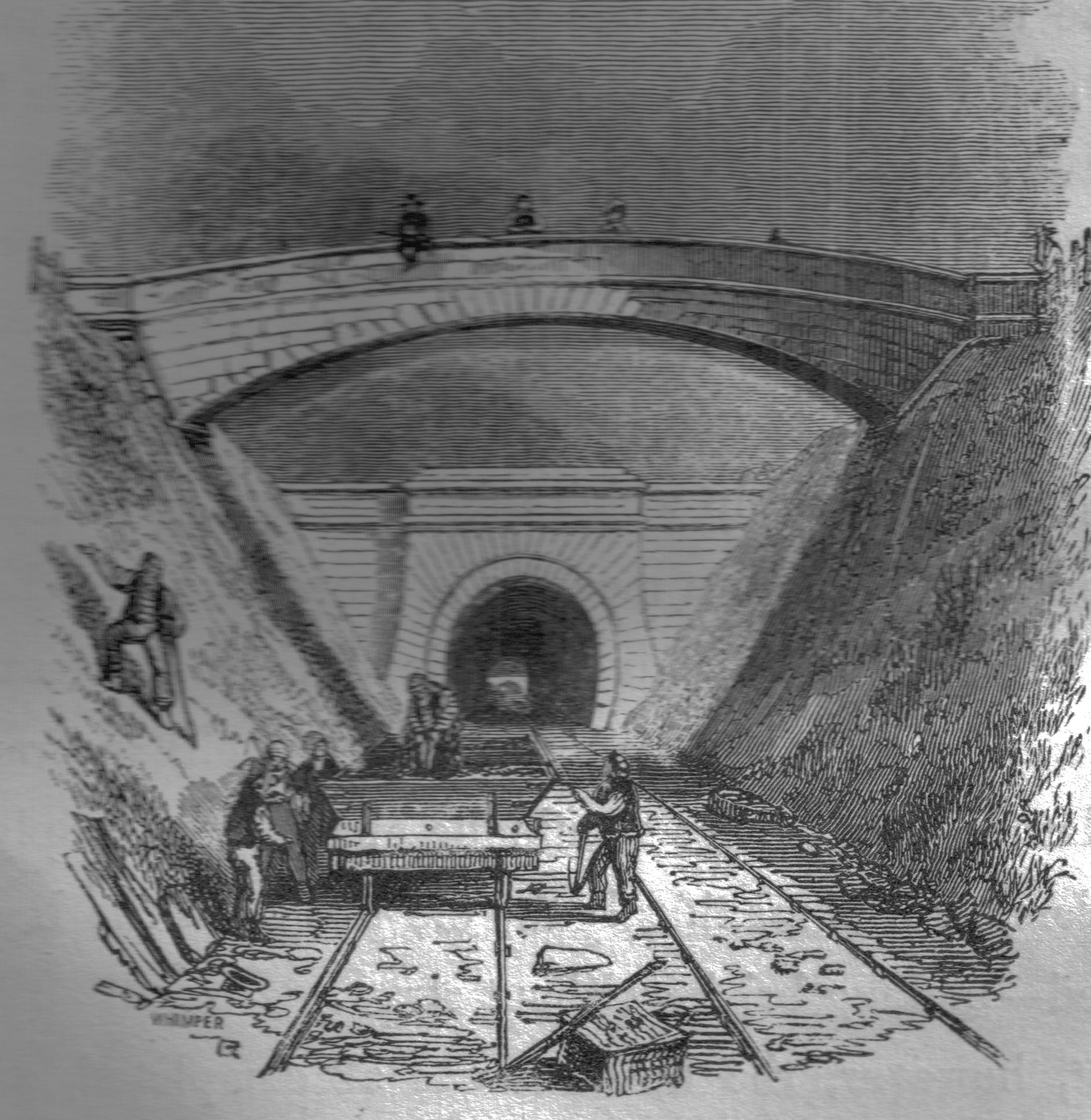
Beechwood Tunnel near Coventry

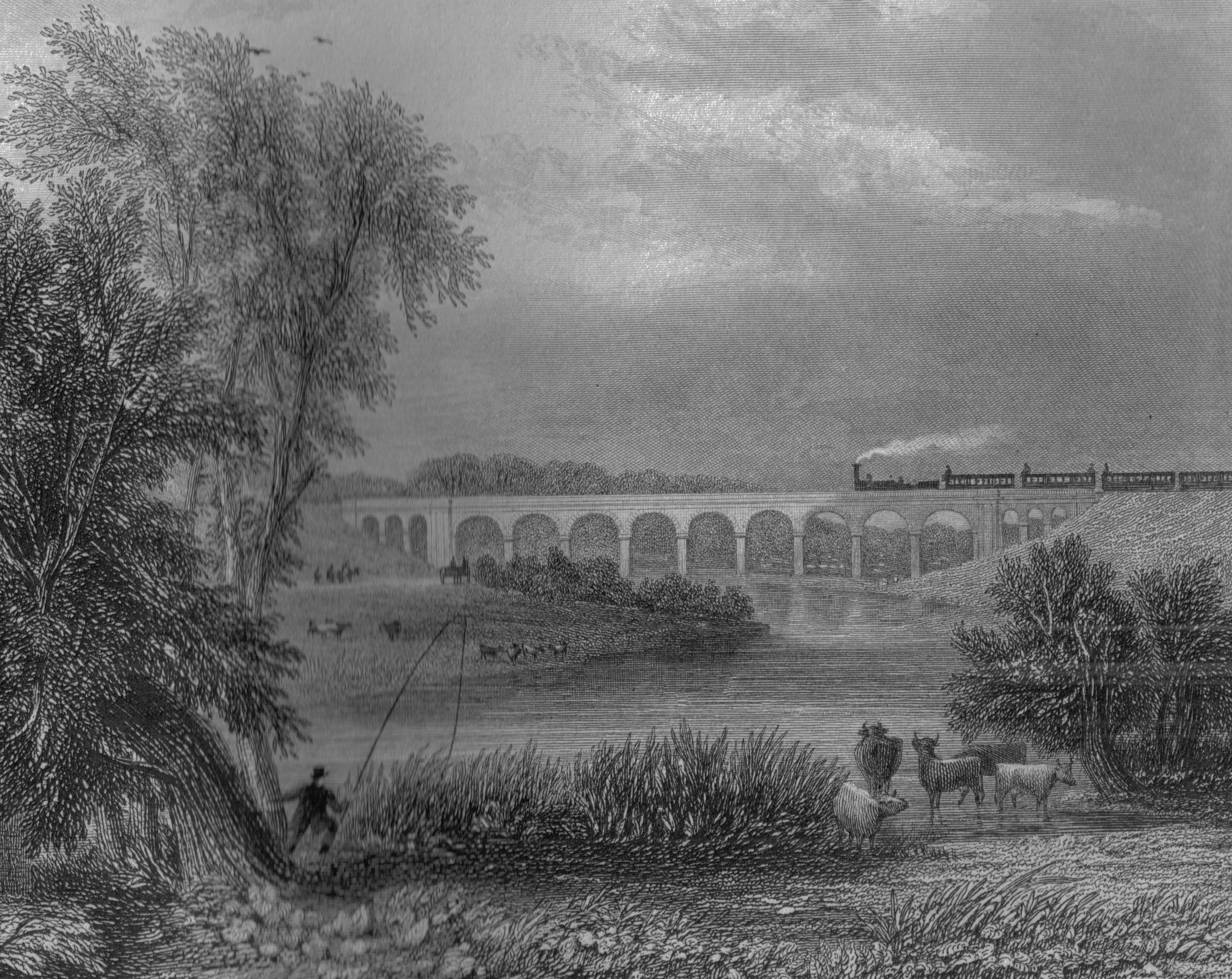
The Avon Viaduct at Wolston in 1838

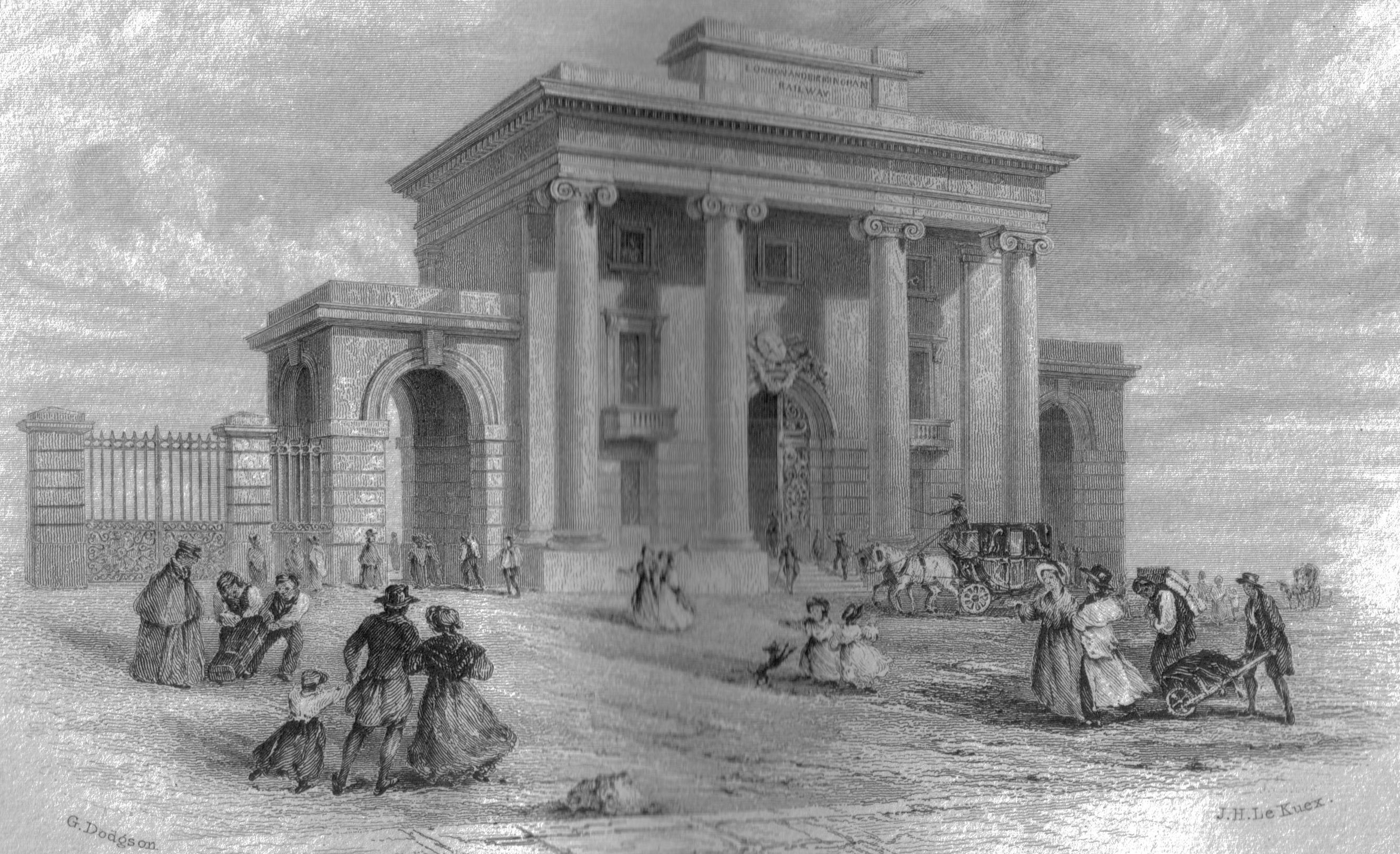
The Birmingham Terminus, as intended with flanking arches, but these were not built

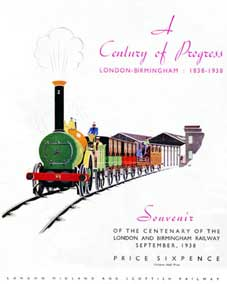
LMS London and Birmingham Railway Centenary 1938 souvenir, illustrating the 2-2-0 locomotive of Edward Bury

== See also ==
- John Cooke Bourne
- Locomotives of the London and North Western Railway
- Wolverton railway works
