= Brandon Viaduct =

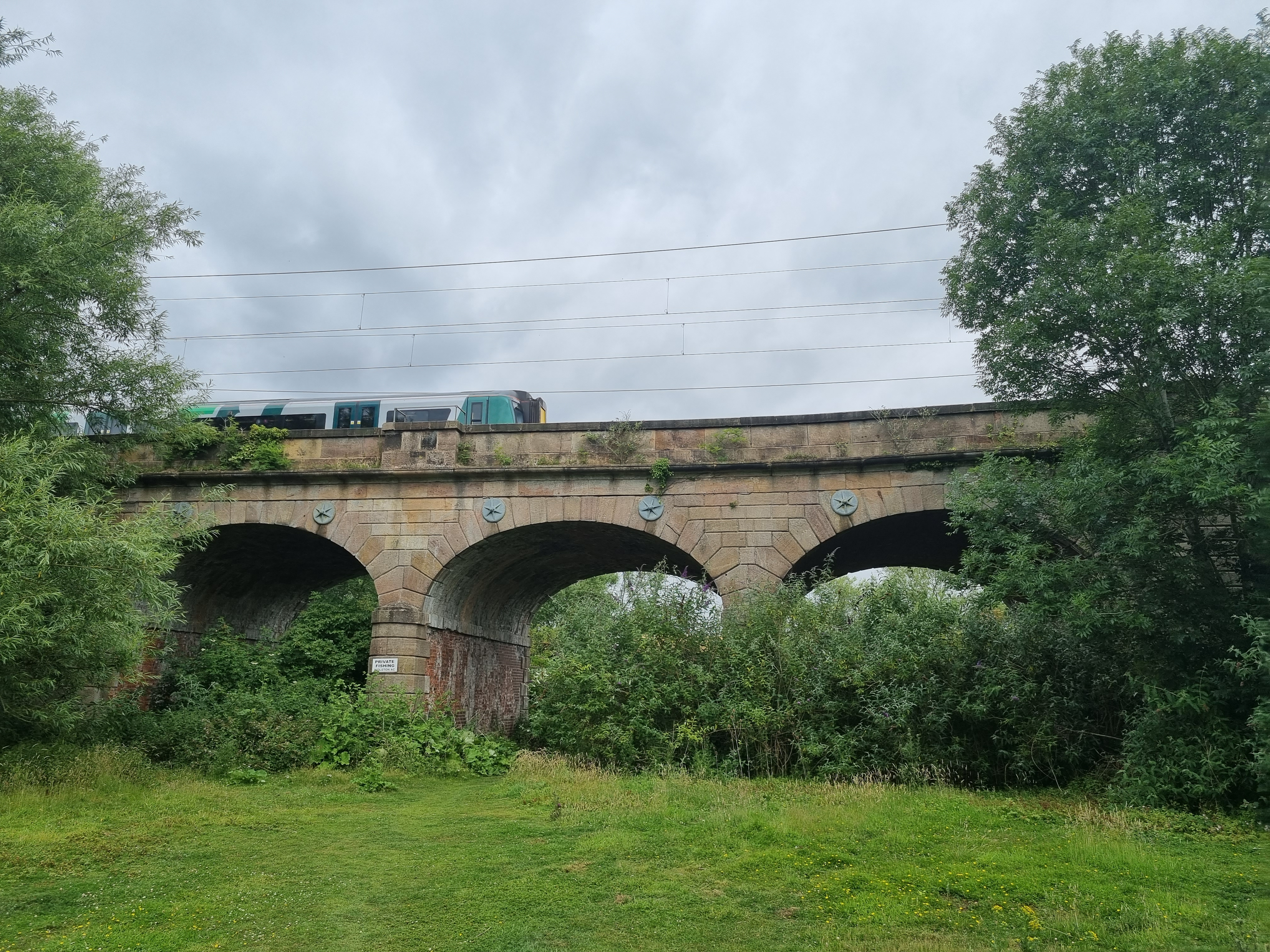
- The bridge with a train on it in 2022; the two arches on the right span the river
- Coordinates: 52°22′53″N 1°23′59″W
- Carries: Birmingham Loop
- Crosses: River Avon, Warwickshire
- Locale: Brandon/Wolston, Warwickshire, England
- Maintained by: Network Rail
- Heritage status: Grade II listed building

Characteristics
- Height: 40 feet (12 m)

History
- Construction end: 1835

Brandon Viaduct (also known as Wolston Viaduct or the Avon Viaduct) is a railway viaduct crossing the River Avon between the villages of Brandon and Wolston in Warwickshire. It carries the Birmingham Loop line and is roughly halfway between Rugby and Coventry. The bridge was built in around 1835 for the London and Birmingham Railway and is now a grade II listed building.

== Description ==
The viaduct is comparatively low but lengthy. It separates the adjacent villages of Brandon and Wolston, which are on either side of the railway. It crosses the River Avon and its flood plain, also spanning the road between the two villages. It consists of fifteen arches—nine semi-elliptical arches spanning 24 feet (7.3 metres) and three 10-foot (3-metre) span ancillary arches on each side. Two of the ancillary arches on the western side have been bricked up and are partially covered by an embankment. The bridge was built from brick but faced with sandstone. The arches have stepped voussoirs and an ogee-moulded (serpentine) cornice with a brick soffit projecting from below the parapet. The piers between each arch taper as they rise. The piers between the ancillary arches and the large ones are wider and terminate in octagonal caps.

== History ==
The bridge was built for the London and Birmingham Railway (LBR's), whose chief engineer was Robert Stephenson. Construction began in 1835 and the bridge was complete in 1837 for the opening of the railway in 1838. It is still in use, now owned by Network Rail as part of the Birmingham Loop. The bridge is one of the scenes depicted in John Cooke Bourne's Series of Lithographic Drawings on the London and Birmingham Railway, published in 1838. It was designated a grade II listed building on 25 August 1987 for its historical or architectural interest. A short distance to the west of the viaduct was the former Brandon and Wolston railway station, which was opened in 1838, and closed in 1960.

The bridge is of a similar design to Wolverton Viaduct, also built by the London and Birmingham, closer to London. Much of the LBR's route has been significantly altered in modernisation schemes but the three major viaducts between Rugby and Coventry—Brandon Viaduct, the Sowe Viaduct, and the Sherbourne Viaduct (also depicted by Bourne)—remain largely as-built.

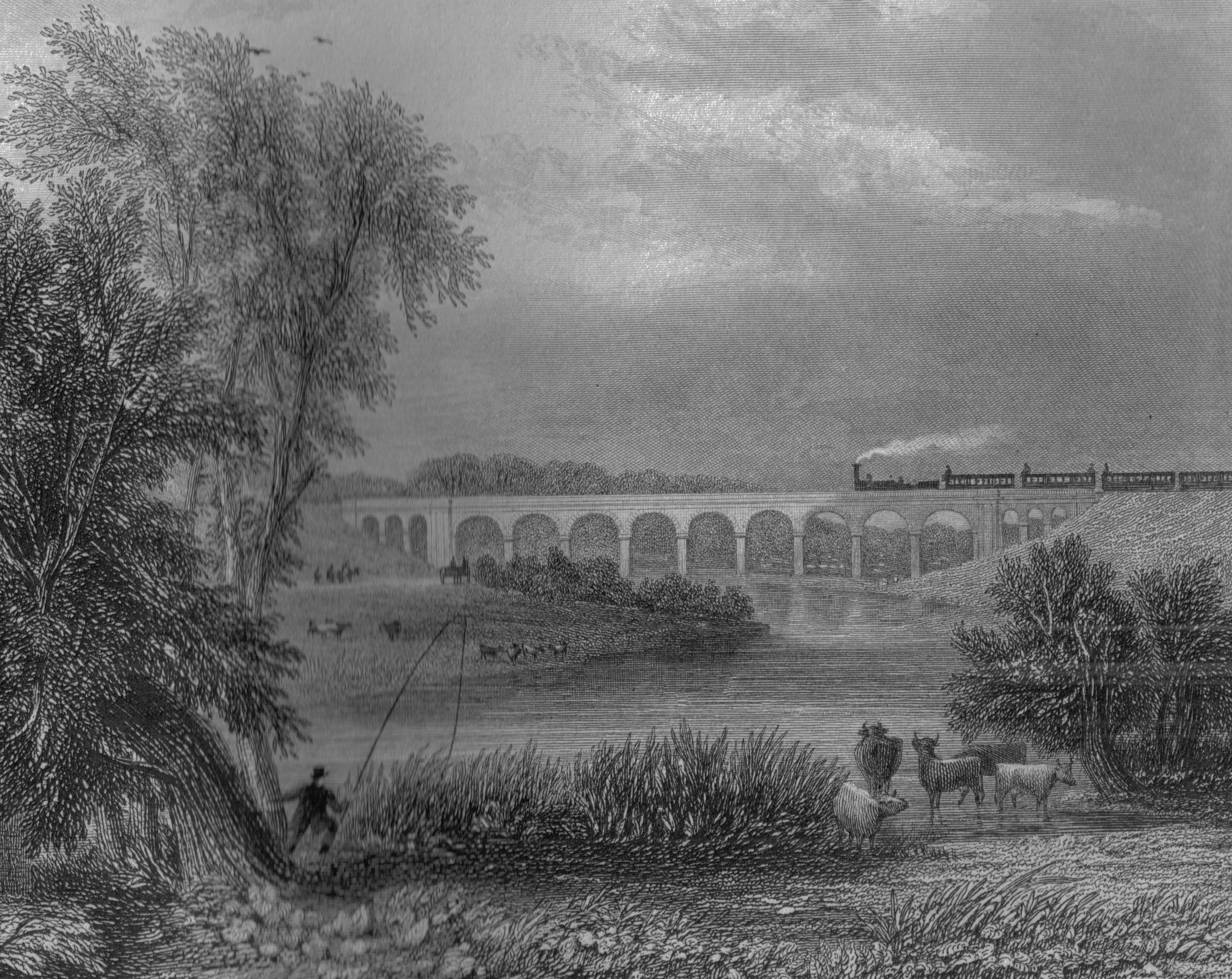
Period drawing of the viaduct from 1839

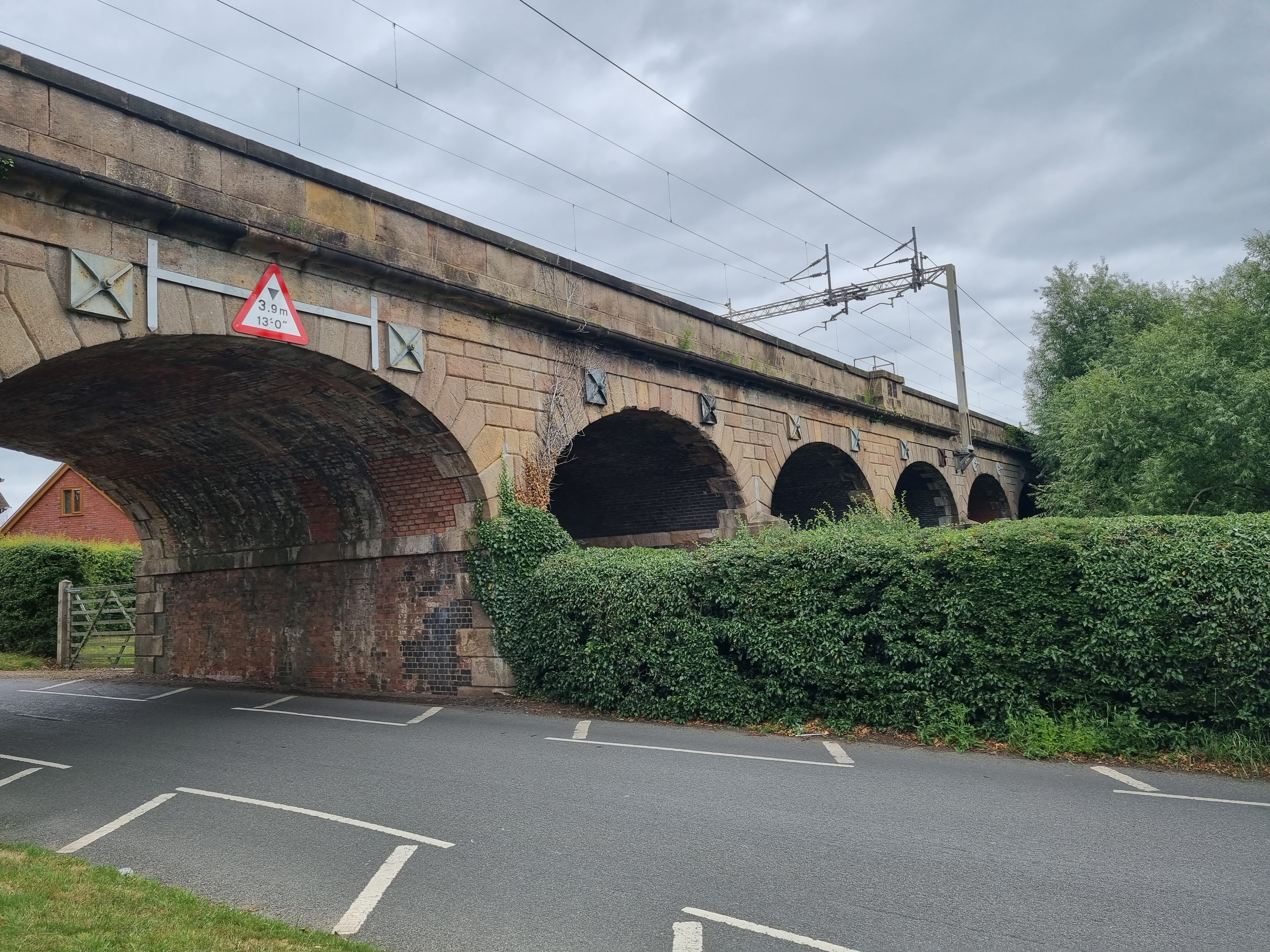
The viaduct crossing the road

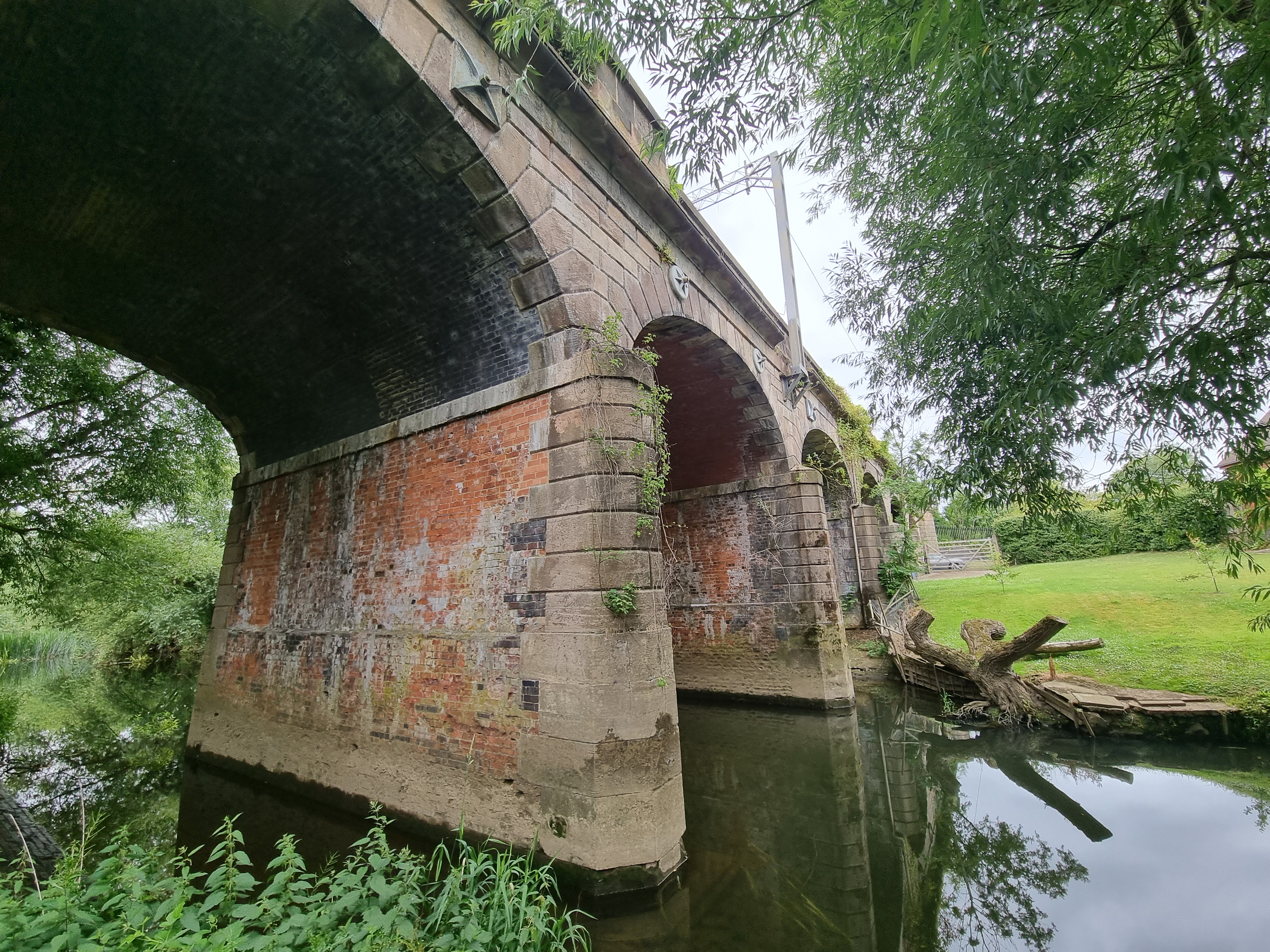
The viaduct crossing the Avon.

== See also ==
- Midland Counties Railway Viaduct, Rugby, another viaduct over the same river in Warwickshire
- List of crossings of the River Avon, Warwickshire
