= Brandon Castle =

Coordinates: 52.37962°N 1.40204°W

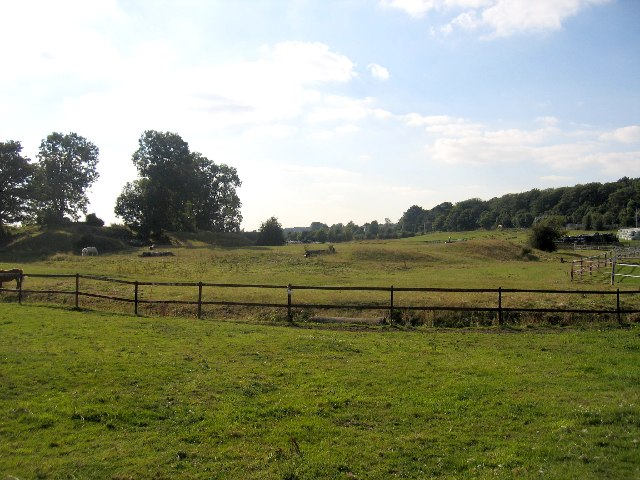
Low earthworks, the remains of Brandon Castle

Brandon Castle was sited overlooking the River Avon between the virtually adjacent villages of Brandon and Wolston in Warwickshire, which in turn lie between the town of Rugby and city of Coventry (grid reference SP408759).

It was originally a 12th-century earthwork motte and bailey fortress founded by Geoffrey de Clinton. Around 1226 the de Verdon family founded the stone castle consisting of the keep and a large outer enclosure. It is said to have been 'pulled down' (slighted) by the baronial troops from Kenilworth Castle in 1265 because John de Verdon was an active supporter of the king.

Only low earthworks and some masonry are now visible.

The site is a scheduled ancient monument. It has been placed on the Heritage at Risk Register due to the risks from scrub and tree growth, and its condition is declining.

== See also ==
- Castles in Great Britain and Ireland
- List of castles in England
