= Ryton Pools Country Park =

Country park in Warwickshire, England

Coordinates: 52.34931°N 1.45383°W

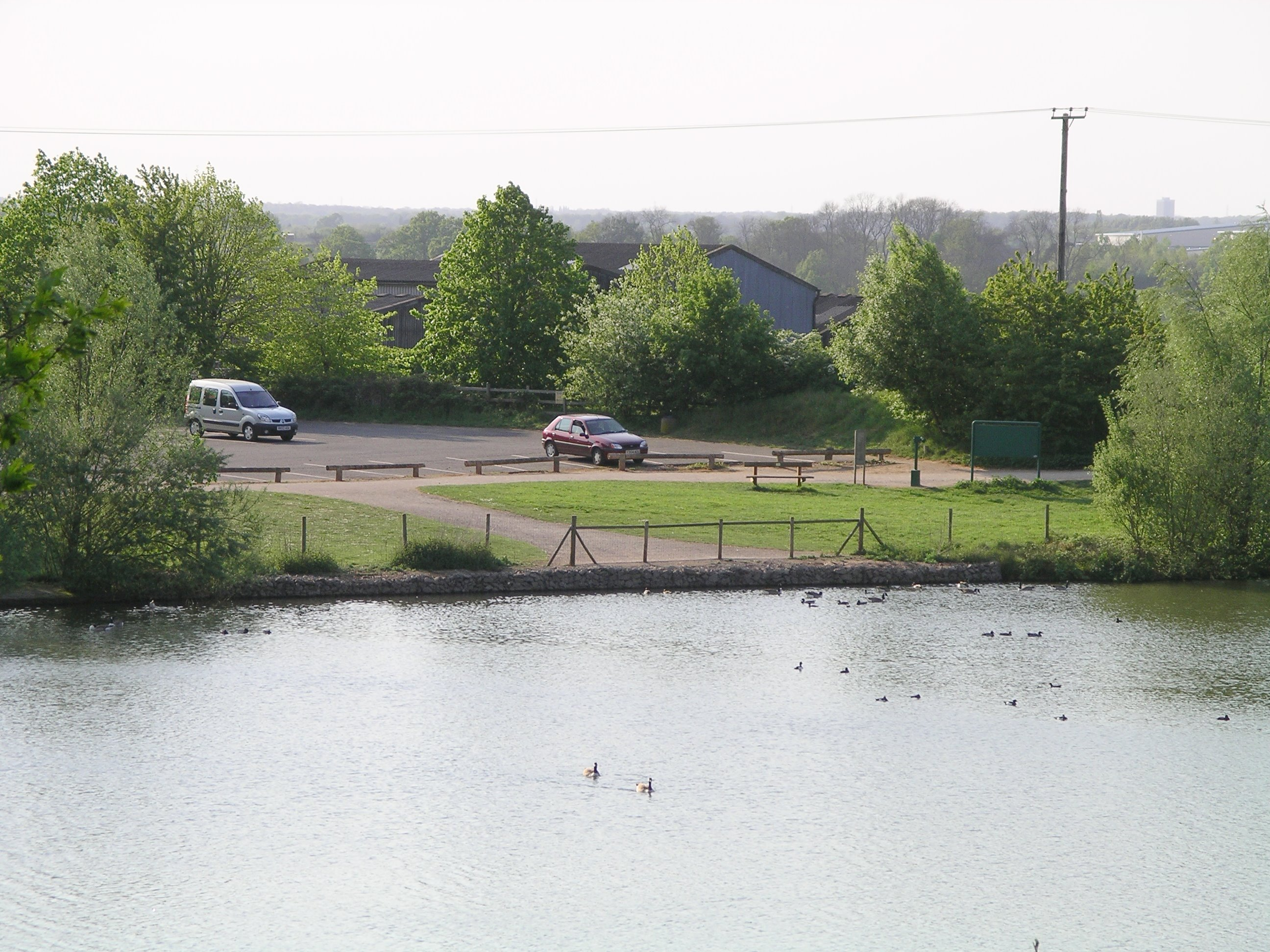
One of the pools and one of the car parks at Ryton Pools

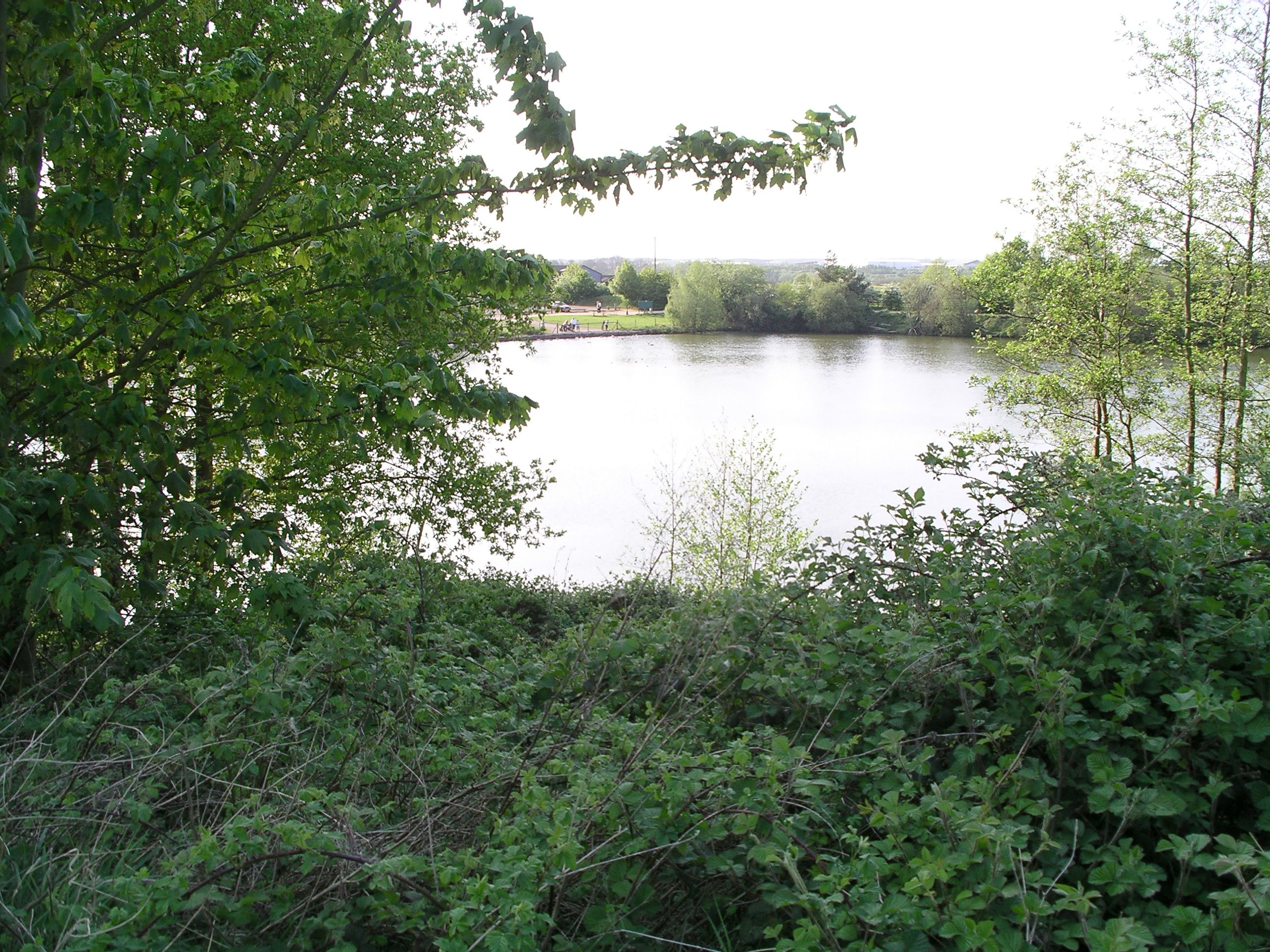
Photo of one of the pools from the top of a high bank on one side of the pool

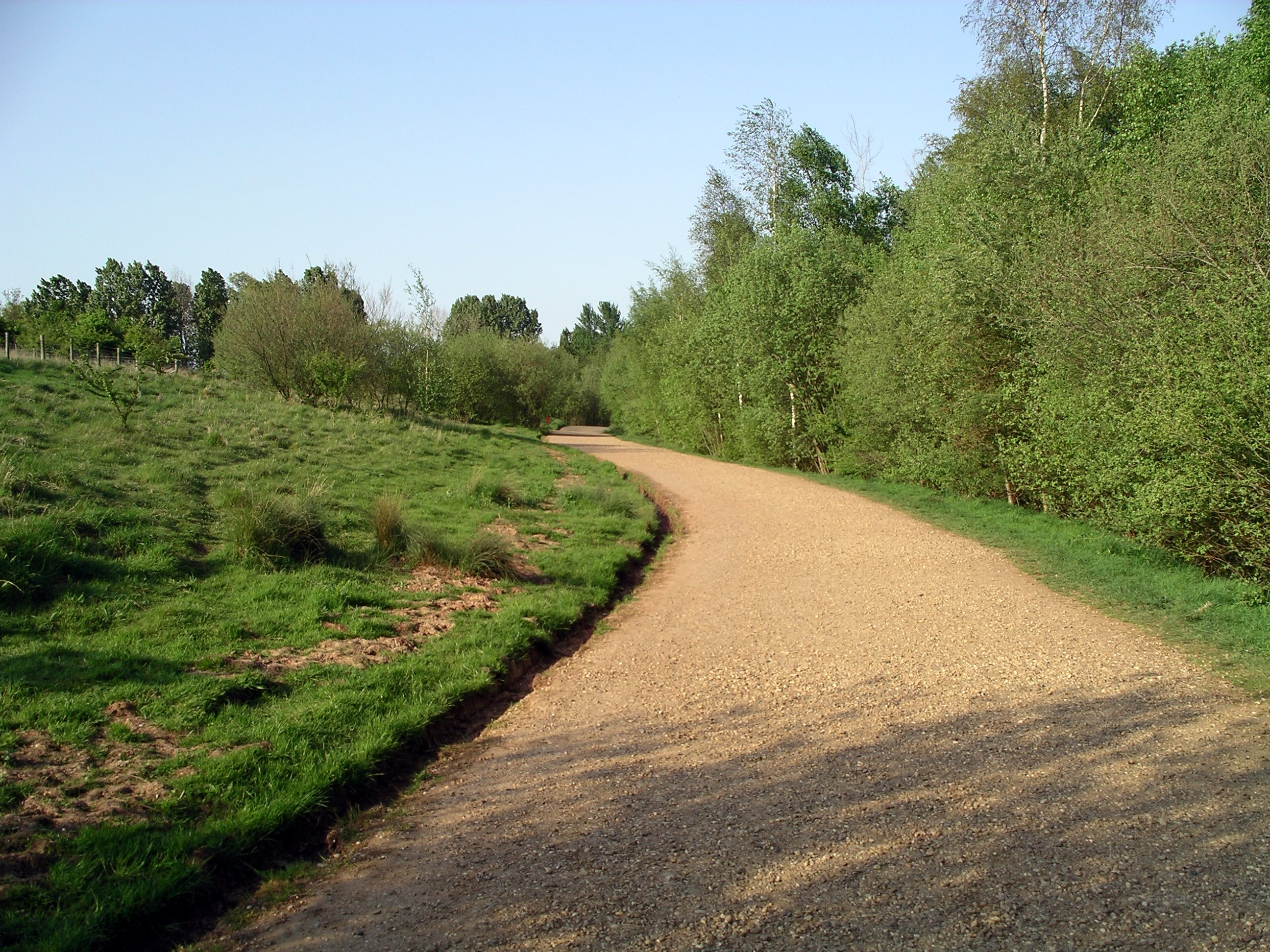
A shale path in the park

Ryton Pools Country Park is a country park one mile (1.6 km) south west of the village of Ryton on Dunsmore in Warwickshire, England. The park occupies an area of about 100 acres (0.40 km^{2}) and contains four pools, the largest of which covers approximately 10 acres (40,000 m^{2}). Professional park rangers are employed to look after the varied flora and fauna of the park as well as the general maintenance of pathways and buildings.

The park is run by Warwickshire County Council with half in Rugby Borough and half in Warwick District boundary. The area of the park containing the pools is reasonably flat and suitable for wheelchair access.

== History ==
Lower Palaeolithic hand axes have been found in the sand and gravel pits close to the park. These indicate that Heidelberg Man (Homo heidelbergensis), lived here about half a million years. At the same time the area would have been dominated by the huge Bytham River, which was, at the time, the second largest river in what is now England. The Bytham was destroyed by advancing ice sheets around 450,000 years ago.

Much more recently the park was a set of fields until 1965 when the land was purchased and used as a landfill site for the nearby towns of Leamington Spa, Rugby and Coventry. Waste was dumped there for 27 years until 1992 when work started on developing part of the site into a country park, which included the flooding of the pits. The park officially opened in 1996 with over 2,500 trees and shrubs being planted. In the late 1990s the remainder of the landfill site was filled in and new pools were created, as well as the provision of several portable metal cabins to act as information centres. These were superseded by better and more permanent wooden ones in 2002, although the metal ones are still in use.

== Facilities ==
The grounds have official opening times which vary according to the seasons; however, visitors can enter the park on-foot outside these hours if they wish. There are two car parks in the park, and there is currently a flat rate charge of £3.50 for any vehicle to enter the park. Public transport to the park is extremely limited.

Facilities at the park include a visitor centre/cafe and gift shop, two children's play areas for different ages of children, a bird hide, a cycle hire centre, miles of pathed and unpathed walks, and fishing facilities and a miniature railway run by the Coventry Model Engineering Society. The railway is around 610 metres (2000ft or so) long and operates for the public every Sunday afternoon (1pm-4pm) from Easter until the end of September. Train rides are £1.50 per person per ride with the journey lasting around 6 minutes or so. Trains are hauled by either a steam or diesel locomotive. (All trains run weather permitting).

The park also organises events for children such as parties, birds of prey spotting, "creepy crawly club", nest box building, and "prams in the park" (walking for parents with babies). There is a bird hide located by one of the pools where visitors can observe the wildlife in relative quiet.

== Energy from methane ==
A methane-powered electricity generator is situated in the park. It uses the methane which results from the decomposition of the organic rubbish that was dumped nearby when the area was used as a landfill site. In one year it provides the National Grid with enough electricity to run the equivalent of 18 secondary schools or roughly 2,000 houses. Information about the project, which is intended primarily for school children, is available within the generator building where there is also an opportunity to see the generators themselves.

== Ryton Wood ==
Ryton Wood, situated next to the country park, is 94 hectares (230 acres) of oak woodland which is designated a Site of Special Scientific Interest, and owned by Warwickshire Wildlife Trust. It is also open to the public.
