= Alvecote Pools =

Protected area in Staffordshire and Warwickshire, England

Coordinates: 52.64217°N 1.63345°W

- Site of Special Scientific Interest
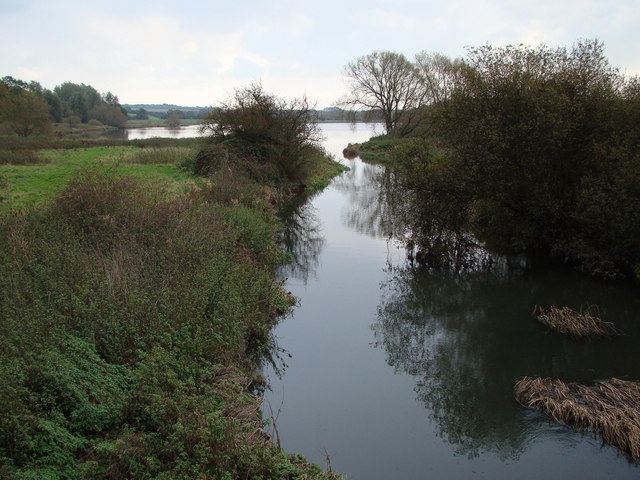
- River Anker and Alvecote Pools
- Location of Alvecote Pools.
- Area of search: Warwickshire
- Grid reference: SK243050
- Interest: Biological
- Area: 128 ha (320 acres)
- Notification date: 1955

Alvecote Pools is a Site of Special Scientific Interest (SSSI) and nature reserve situated alongside the River Anker, adjacent to the hamlet of Alvecote on the border of Warwickshire and Staffordshire in England. The majority of the reserve lies in the former county. Consisting of two discrete areas, Pooley Fields and Alvecote Meadows, the site covers 128 ha (320 acres) in total and is the largest SSSI in Warwickshire. First notified in 1955, the site has been owned by the Warwickshire Wildlife Trust since 1997.

The site is effectively a series of shallow pools alongside the river that have arisen as an effect of colliery subsidence from Alvecote Colliery, which was later merged to form North Warwickshire Colliery and which ceased operation in 1965. In addition to the wetland habitat, there are areas of fen, reedbed and woodland. As a result, the area is regionally important for bird life, and over 100 species are reported annually, with between 60 and 70 breeding. The site is also important for beetles, with 322 species recorded, and spiders (121 species).
