= Warwickshire Wildlife Trust =

Conservation charity in England

Warwickshire Wildlife Trust is a Wildlife Trust and Registered Charity covering the county of Warwickshire and Solihull and Coventry in the county of West Midlands, England. The Trust aims to protect and enhance wildlife, natural habitats and geology throughout Warwickshire, Coventry and Solihull. (Solihull and Coventry, were formerly in Warwickshire and are now in the West Midlands county.)

== Trust ==
The Trust headquarters are at Brandon Marsh Nature Reserve near Brandon in Warwickshire. Brandon Marsh is one of 65 reserves that the Trust oversees, including Bubbenhall Wood and Meadow near Coventry, Wappenbury Wood by Princethorpe, Ufton Fields near Southam and the River Arrow Nature Reserve in Alcester.

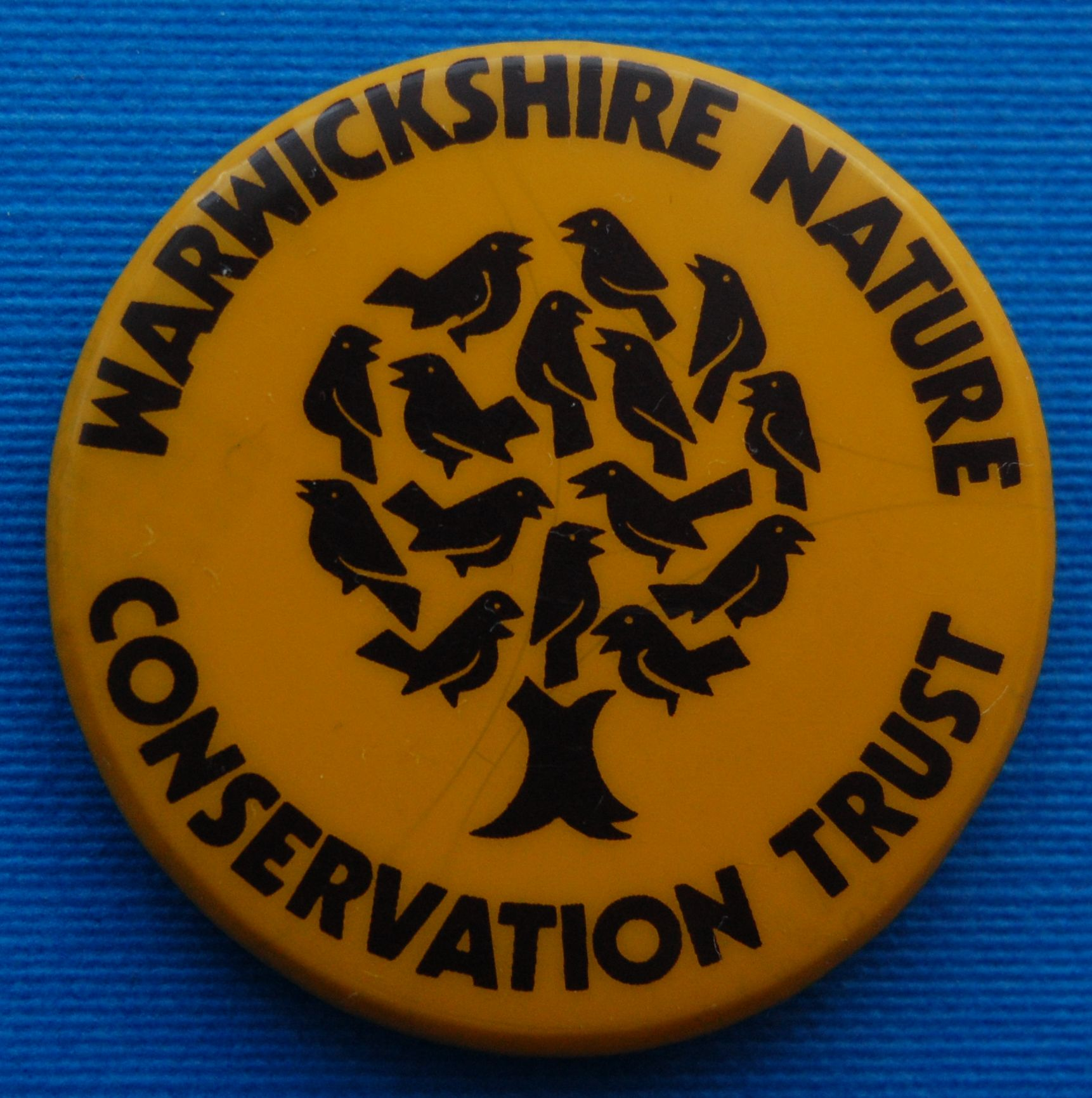
Warwickshire Nature Conservation Trust badge from the late 1980s

The trust was founded on 6 June 1957 and was originally called The West Midlands Trust for Nature Conservation Limited which split into the Staffordshire Nature Conservation Trust, Worcestershire Nature Conservation Trust and Warwickshire Nature Conservation Trust between 1968 and 1971. It was popularly known as WARNACT from warn-act over this period, until changing its name to Warwickshire Wildlife Trust in the 1990s. From 1980, together with the other two county Trusts, it withdrew from Birmingham and the Black Country when the Urban Wildlife Group was established.
