= Kingsbury Wood =

Protected area in Warwickshire, England

- Site of Special Scientific Interest
- Location within Warwickshire
- Location of Kingsbury Wood.
- Area of search: Warwickshire
- Grid reference: SP233976
- Coordinates: 52.575723°N 1.6576136°W
- Area: 154.2 acres (0.6240 km^{2}; 0.2409 sq mi)
- Notification date: 1986

Kingsbury Wood is a Site of Special Scientific Interest (SSSI) located between Kingsbury and Freasley in Warwickshire, England.

== Description ==
Kingsbury Wood is an ancient woodland, noted for the diversity of its bird species. Oak and Silver birch dominate most of the woodland in this protected area, over an understorey of hazel. Limestone workings at the site have allowed plant species adapted to alkaline soil to grow here, including fairy flax and twayblade.

Bird species diversity at Kingsbury Woodland includes three species of woodpecker, six species of tits and six species of warbler. Treecreeper, tawny owl and woodcock have also been recorded here.

All of the land within the site designated as Kingsbury Wood SSSI is owned by the Ministry of Defence. The whole protected area is located inside Kingsbury Rifle Range (access is closed when red flags are flying).
