= Bretford =

Hamlet in Warwickshire, England

Coordinates: 52.391°N 1.370°W

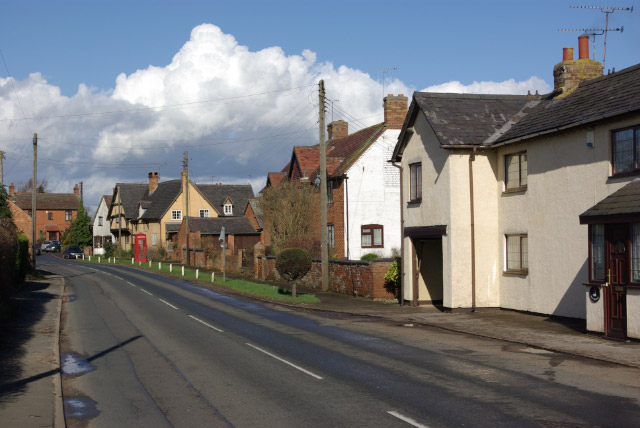
Bretford

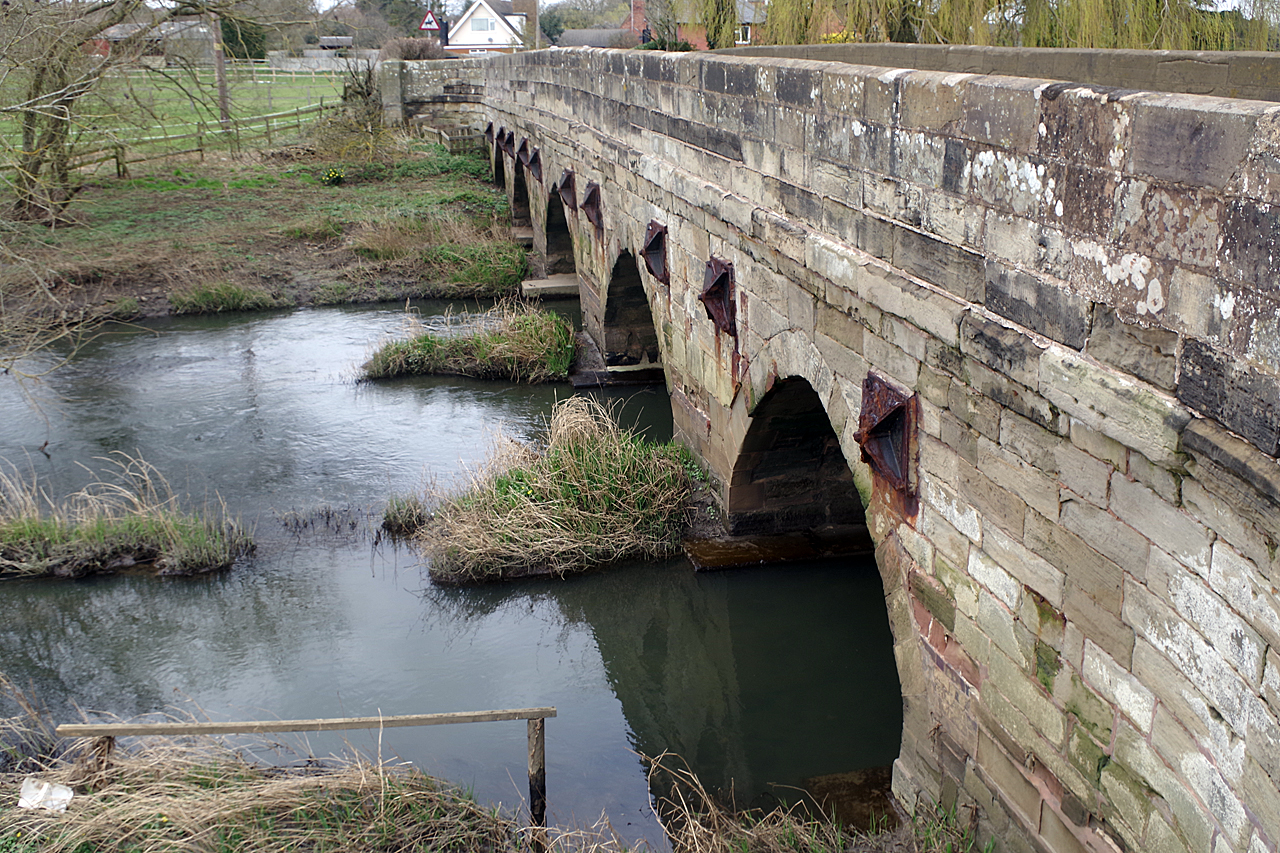
Bretford Bridge across the Avon.

Bretford is a hamlet in the Borough of Rugby, Warwickshire, England. It is part of the civil parish of Brandon and Bretford.

== Location ==
It is situated about 5 miles (8 km) west of Rugby and 7.5 miles (12.1 km) east-southeast of Coventry, at a junction of the A428 road (Coventry–Rugby) and the old Fosse Way. The two roads converge temporarily at Bretford, where they cross the River Avon on a five-arched, stone bridge just south of the village. The bridge is a Grade II listed building. It is too narrow for two-way traffic and is controlled by traffic lights.

== History ==
The name of the village, first recorded about 1100, is derived from the Old English bred ford, meaning "the plank ford". The reference is probably to a plank footbridge or post marking the ford across the River Avon, which preceded the bridge. The original Roman line of the Fosse Way was diverted to the west in the Middle Ages to its present crossing point. The first record of the bridge is from 1279. It was said to have suffered damage during the English Civil War after which it was extensively repaired in 1653. The bridge was largely rebuilt in the 18th century to the original medieval design.

In the Middle Ages Bretford was considerably more important than it is now; it was founded as a planned market town in 1227 by the Lord of the manor, John de Verdon. It was also the site of a leper hospital. Following the Black Death in the 14th century, Bretford fell into decline and never recovered. The hamlet now consists of around twenty houses, a pub called the Queen's Head, a farm, a small village hall, and the bridge across the Avon.

During the Second World War a lighting decoy site was established around 1 km north-west of Bretford, designed to trick German bombers into dropping their bombs harmlessly onto fields at the wrong location, instead of on their intended target of nearby Coventry.
