= Peter Lecount =

British Royal Navy officer (1794–1852)

- Peter Lecount
- Born: 25 May 1794
- Died: 1852
- Occupation: Naval officer
- Awards: Fellow of the Royal Astronomical Society

Lieutenant Peter Lecount RN FRAS CE (25 May 1794 - 1852) was a naval officer and a civil engineer with a strong interest in railways.

He joined the navy in 1809 and saw active service until going on half-pay in 1827.

He was made a Fellow of the Royal Astronomical Society while a midshipman. Between 1820 and 1823 he wrote papers and related letters to the Board of Longitude on clocks and chronometers, celestial navigation, particularly using Jupiter's satellites, and a marine chair for observing them.

He was the author of "The History of the Railway connecting London and Birmingham"; "A Practical Treatise on Railways, explaining their construction and management", originally published as Railways in the seventh Edition of the Encyclopædia Britannica; "An Examination of Professor Barlow's reports on iron rails, etc." 1836.
