= Brandon and Wolston railway station =

Former railway station in Warwickshire, England

Coordinates: 52.38146°N 1.40343°W

Brandon and Wolston
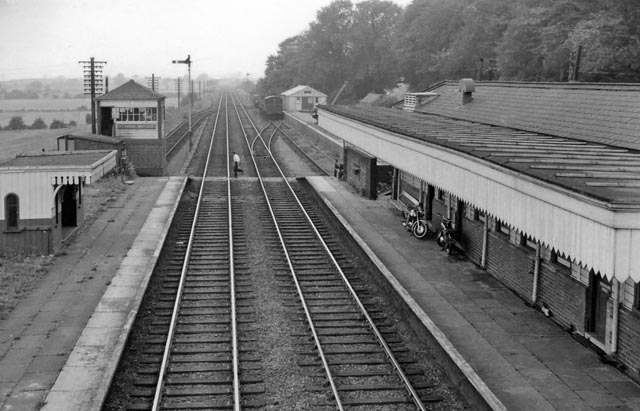
- The station in 1962

General information
- Location: Brandon and Wolston, Warwickshire; England
- Platforms: 2

Other information
- Status: Disused

History
- Original company: London and Birmingham Railway
- Pre-grouping: London and North Western Railway
- Post-grouping: London, Midland and Scottish Railway

Key dates
- 9 April 1838: Station opens as Brandon
- 2 October 1879: rebuilt as Brandon and Wolston
- 12 September 1960: Station closes
Location

Brandon and Wolston railway station was a railway station serving the villages of Brandon and Wolston in the English county of Warwickshire.

The original Brandon station was built by the London and Birmingham Railway and was the only one between Coventry and Rugby. It was replaced by a new station nearby, Brandon and Wolston, in 1879.

There were small sidings on each side of the double track, with a goods shed on the up. For each, until 1903, there were wagon turntables, with track between them passing at right angles across the running lines. Although this was a common arrangement for small wayside stations, the LNWR had removed them elsewhere before 1880.

At grouping in 1923 it became part of the London Midland and Scottish Railway.

There was a fairly substantial timber-built booking office on the up platform, and a footbridge, as was required by the Inspector of Railways for stations built at that late date. The LNWR provided only five trains a day in each direction, less than a third for stations at that time and in that area. By 1938 the LMS was providing about a dozen trains a day but this trade virtually disappeared after the war.

The station never generated a great deal of business and was closed on 12 September 1960. The signal cabin which had survived, possibly since 1879, was closed when Rugby power box was opened in September 1964.

Preceding station	Historical railways	Following station
Coventry; Line and station open	London and North Western Railway; Rugby–Birmingham–Stafford Line	Rugby; Line and station open
