= Brandon Marsh nature reserve =

Nature reserve in Warwickshire, England

Coordinates: 52.376°N 1.434°W

Brandon Marsh
- Site of Special Scientific Interest
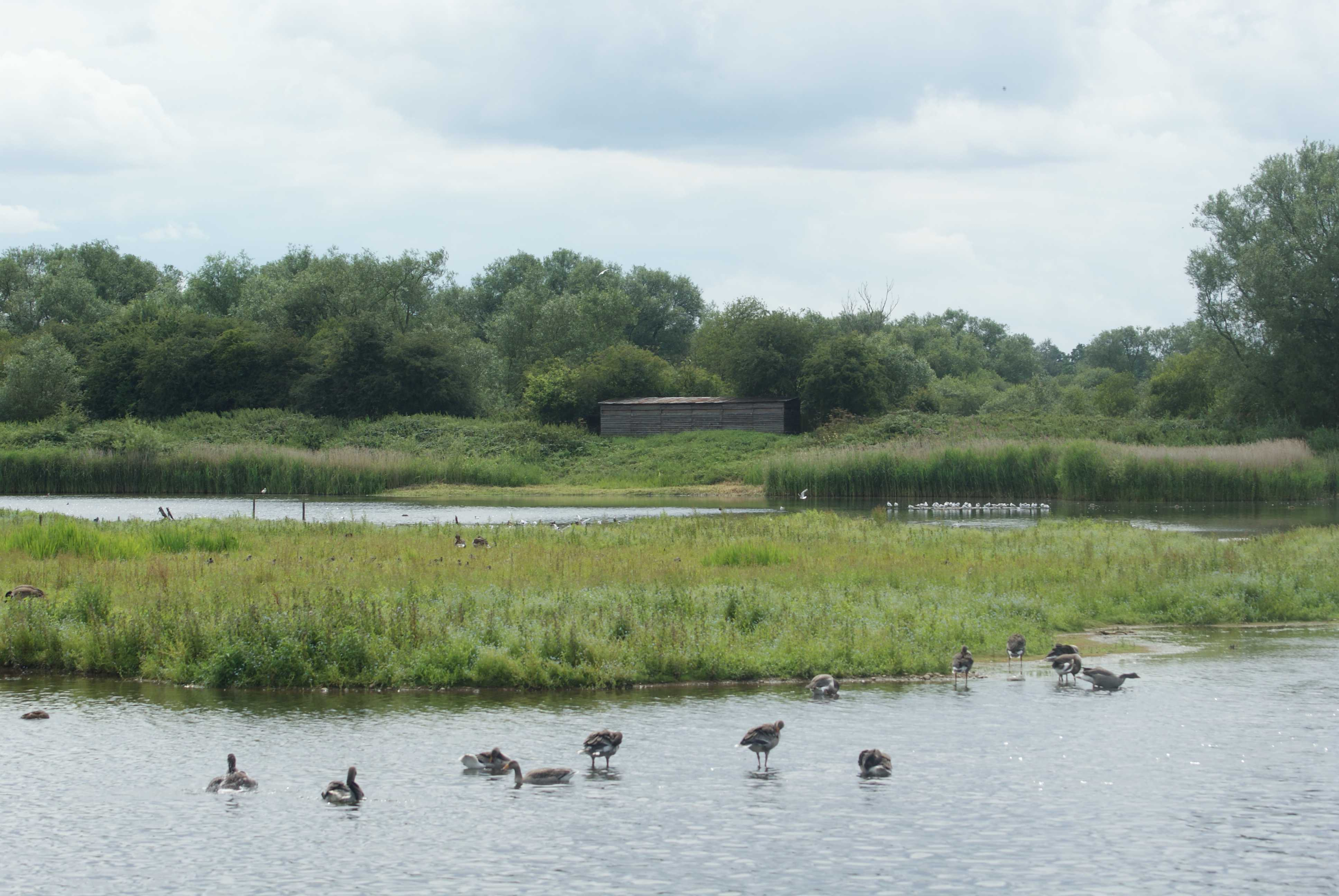
- East Marsh Pool with Willow Island in the foreground, July 2009
- Location of Brandon Marsh.
- Area of search: Warwickshire
- Grid reference: SP386762
- Interest: Biological
- Area: 92 ha (230 acres)
- Notification date: 1973

Brandon Marsh is a Site of Special Scientific Interest (SSSI) and nature reserve in Warwickshire, England. It is situated adjacent to the River Avon, near the village of Brandon, a few miles east of Coventry.

The reserve is also the headquarters of the Warwickshire Wildlife Trust. Formerly used for sand and gravel quarrying, the 92 hectares (230 acres) site is owned by French industrial company LaFarge Industries and is leased to the Trust.

Today, Brandon Marsh is a mixture of flooded gravel pits, fen, scrubland, reedbeds and woodland, much of which is uncommon habitat for the local area. The site is particularly important for birdlife, with a wide range of breeding and wintering birds—237 different species had been recorded up to the end of 2018. The reserve also supports a variety of mammals and insects, over 500 species of plant, and more than 570 species of fungi. The nature reserve and Visitor Centre are open to the public seven days a week.

== History ==
Although the landscape features of the site are mainly derived from gravel pits and settling pools alongside the River Avon, the area was originally farmland, and the first pools were created by mining subsidence in the 1940s and 1950s caused by workings at Binley Colliery. The site was of interest to local naturalists for its range of bird life, especially as by 1959 the area of open water was far larger than it is now, although much was lost when Severn Trent Water dredged it in 1963. Shortly afterwards the first official attempts at using the site for conservation purposes came when the West Midlands Trust for Nature Conservation, supported by the West Midland Bird Club began moves to secure the site as a Site of Special Scientific Interest (SSSI). The Brandon Marsh Conservation Group was formed in 1968, and by 1973 the site had been confirmed as an SSSI. In 1981, the Warwickshire Wildlife Trust (the successor to the West Midlands Trust) came to an agreement with Lafarge whereby the site is leased for a period of 99 years at a peppercorn amount of £1 a year, leading to the creation of the nature reserve.

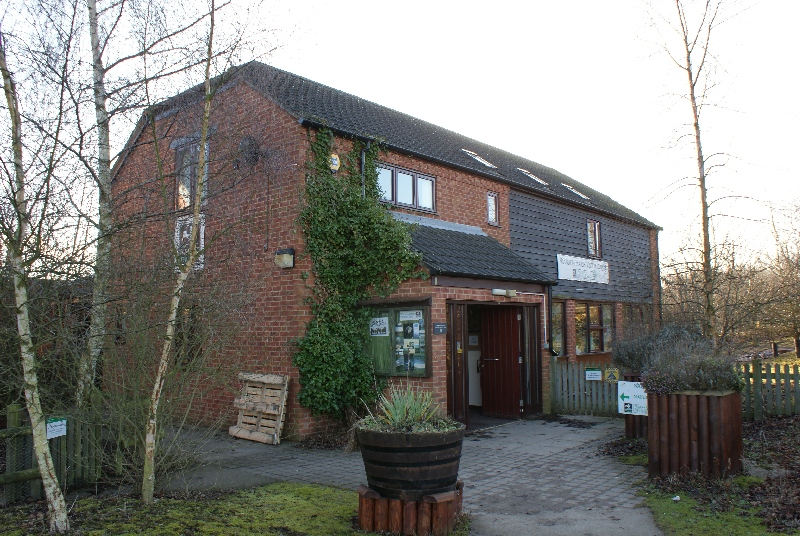
Visitor Centre

The first bird hides were constructed in 1984, overlooking the East Marsh and Teal Pools. Quarrying ceased in 1989, and by 1991 the Trust had moved their headquarters to the site and erected a small visitor centre.

As improvements to the reserve continued and visitor numbers grew, a requirement for a much improved infrastructure was identified, and in 1998 the new Visitor Centre at Brandon Marsh was opened by Sir David Attenborough. It cost over £600,000 to build and was mainly funded by the Heritage Lottery Fund, with support from Lafarge through the Landfill Tax Credit Scheme and an appeal to Trust members. The centre is open to the public every day of the year except Christmas Day, and also houses an Education Centre catering for school visits, a conference centre, and a tearoom and gift shop.

== Nature reserve ==
The nature reserve itself is a large expanse of wetland and pools. There are a number of paths and trails for visitors to follow, and seven bird hides from which to observe the wildlife. The flora and fauna is extremely varied due to the numerous types of habitat, and includes many species that are otherwise rare in the area.

Large numbers of bird species are resident or passage migrants here, including many ducks, geese and waders. The wide range of species is mainly due to Brandon Marsh being one of the few extensive areas of water in the area (accounting for such local rarities as osprey and whooper swan) together with the existence of habitats such as reedbed and woodland in close proximity. 148 different species were recorded during 2009 alone—including one new record, a vagrant woodchat shrike which was the first recorded in Warwickshire—and 66 species bred at the site. These figures have been assisted by a nest box scheme; in 2008 there were 49 occupied nest boxes which produced 270 fledged young, and by 2009 these numbers had increased to 65 and 352 respectively, including two owl species, barn owl and tawny owl.

As well as birds, the reserve also harbours a varied selection of mammals. These are mostly of common species, although otters have been recorded and evidence suggests they were present for the whole of 2009. An attempt is being made to establish the endangered water vole to the site, although success has been irregular and there were no sightings at all during 2008 or 2009. The reserve is a haven for dragonfly and damselfly with areas being tailored to their needs—16 species were recorded in 2008, along with 24 species of butterfly and 220 species of moth.

Plant life varies throughout the reserve depending on the habitat, and notable species are mentioned in the relevant sections. As the reserve develops, new species are being regularly recorded, including four in 2008 and three in 2009. The large number of fungus species recorded is also due to the diversity of habitat, but even so, species unknown elsewhere in the region have been recorded, such as Taphrina pruni and Otidea bufonia.

=== Pools ===
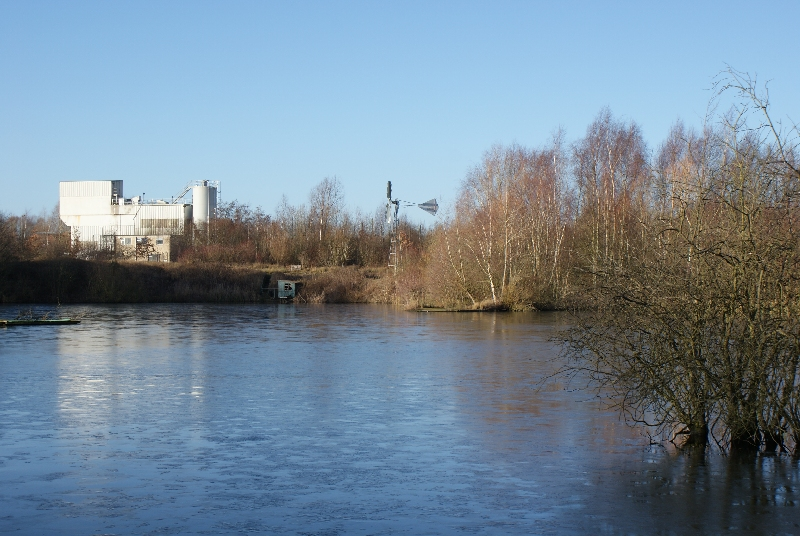
View of Grebe Pool, with the LaFarge aggregate processing centre in the background. The wind pump for irrigation of the reedbeds can also be seen.

There are eight main pools in the reserve, some of which are maintained to support specific flora or fauna. At the centre of the reserve is East Marsh Pool, the largest of the pools, which contains two islands. Tern Island is composed of gravel and pebbles which attracts certain species to breed here, notably common tern and little ringed plover. There are also a number of artificial rafts on the pool, again to induce common tern to breed; eight pairs did so in 2008. Willow Island is much larger and more grassy, providing suitable areas for lapwing, common redshank and green sandpiper. The existence of the islands helps to prevent the nests of species such as these being predated by foxes. There are three hides overlooking the pool. An artificial structure alongside the pool is designed to attract sand martins to breed, as they did when the gravel quarry was operational; this was successful for the first time in 2009, with eight nestholes occupied and over 40 young fledged.

To the south lie Teal Pool and River Pool, created in 1983 when an earth dam was constructed between the two in order that Teal Pool retained water to provide habitat for dabbling duck species, which generally include common teal and mallard. River Pool is a larger expanse of water popular with wading birds, especially redshank and greenshank.

Central Marsh and Pool is a diverse area where the main flora is common reed, reed sweetgrass, sedges, bulrushes and teasel. Willow trees are particularly important in this habitat as they have over 250 species of insect associated with them. Alder trees support birds such as redpoll, siskin and various tit species. Beyond Central Marsh lies West Marsh Pool, a small area of water surrounded by reedbed, where a number of dragonfly pools have been dug. Plants which thrive in damp areas, such as marsh marigold and meadowsweet, flourish here.

Adjacent to the visitor centre are three further pools. Grebe Pool is named for the great crested grebes which regularly breed there, whereas Goose Pool was used by the aggregate company for water storage, and as such the water level is very variable due to its unstable base. Swallow Pool was so named because it was formerly a favourite roosting area for swallows, although this is no longer the case.

=== Reedbeds ===
The main reedbed on the site is known as Newlands, an extensive area forming the eastern end of the reserve. Together with other areas in the West Marsh, the total area of reedbed is now around 25 hectares (62 acres). A wind-powered water pump is currently installed to lift water from the flood plain to irrigate a further 9 hectares (22 acres) area near the Visitor Centre. This project is part of the UK Biodiversity Action Plan which has targeted the creation of 1,200 hectares (3,000 acres) of reedbed nationwide. The reedbeds support a number of acrocephalid warblers such as the reed warbler, sedge warbler and marsh warbler as well as others such as grasshopper warbler, and it was the first recorded breeding site in the region for Cetti's warbler. There is a long-term plan to have an endangered species, the Eurasian bittern, breeding here by 2014 and regular sightings of the species have already occurred, with up to three individual birds being sighted during late 2009. A new hide overlooking Newlands, named after Brandon volunteer Ted Jury who died in 2009, was opened in 2014.

=== Other habitats ===
New Hare Covert is woodland, mainly composed of oak, ash, larch and Scots pine. The area is managed for biodiversity purposes and provides habitat for numerous mammals, including muntjac, as well as woodland bird species. Between New Hare Covert and Swallow Pool there is also an area of grassland, which attracts numerous species of butterfly. The area also has a large population of small mammals such as common shrew, field vole and bank vole, which in turn attract birds of prey such as the common kestrel and short-eared owl.

Horsetail Glade, as the name suggests, is home to a large area of giant horsetails. There are numerous willow species, and common spotted orchid grows here in the summer.

=== Threats ===
Brandon Marsh has a very low risk of pollution and as such the main threat from man has been from vandalism; in 2007, a fire started by youths destroyed a third of the Newlands reedbed. This was the second time the reed bed had been targeted, the previous attack seven years earlier having occurred shortly after threats were made by animal rights activists protesting against a cull of ruddy duck.

Most of the current threats to the biodiversity of the site are natural in origin. A perennial problem is the invasive Japanese knotweed, which shades out local plant species with its dense growth. Removing it is time-consuming as the herbicide used to control it has to be injected straight into the root system, to prevent it reaching other flora. Alder trees are also at risk at the reserve, this time from a fungal disease caused by Phytophthora alni. Being water-borne, this infection could spread to all the alders on the site. Another natural threat is that of the introduced Harlequin ladybird which was first identified at the site in June 2008 and is a severe threat to the native seven-spot ladybird population as it is such an effective aphid predator. Mink are occasional visitors to the reserve, although humane traps are used in an attempt to control them. Mink are a serious threat to ground-nesting birds, and since they are strong swimmers, the nests on the East Marsh islands are vulnerable to them.
