= Warwick District =

Local government district in Warwickshire, England

Coordinates: 52.2894°N 1.5435°W

- Non-metropolitan district
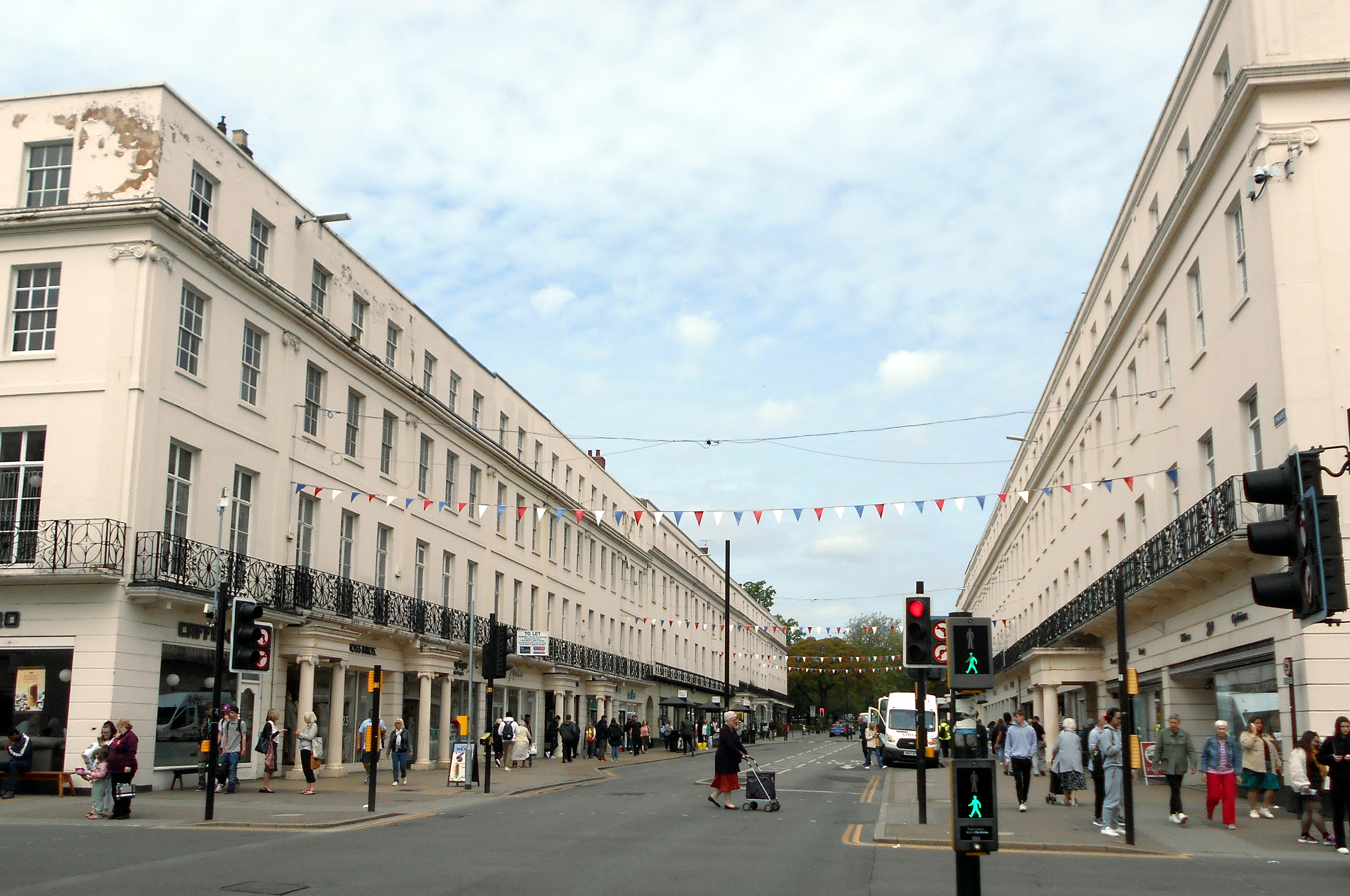
- Leamington Spa, the largest settlement in the district.

- Shown within Warwickshire
- Sovereign state: United Kingdom
- Constituent country: England
- Region: West Midlands
- Administrative county: Warwickshire
- Admin. HQ: Leamington Spa

Government
  - MPs: Matt Western (L); Jeremy Wright (C)

Area
  - Total: 109 sq mi (283 km^{2})
  - Rank: 124th

Population (2021 census)
  - Total: 148,500
  - Rank: 143rd
  - Density: 1,360/sq mi (524/km^{2})

Ethnicity (2021)
  - Ethnic groups: List: 84.6% White; 9.7% Asian; 3% Mixed; 1.6% other; 1.1% Black

Religion (2021)
  - Religion: List: 44.6% Christianity; 40% no religion; 1.5% Islam; 2.5% Hinduism; 0.2% Judaism; 4.2% Sikhism; 0.4% Buddhism; 0.5% other; 6% not stated
- Time zone: UTC+0 (Greenwich Mean Time)
  - Summer (DST): UTC+1 (British Summer Time)
- ONS code: 44UF (ONS); E07000222 (GSS)

Warwick is a local government district in Warwickshire, England. It is named after the historic county town of Warwick, which is the district's second largest town; the largest town is Royal Leamington Spa, where the council is based. The district also includes the towns of Kenilworth and Whitnash and surrounding villages and rural areas. Leamington Spa, Warwick and Whitnash form a conurbation which has about two thirds of the district's population.

The neighbouring districts are Rugby, Stratford-on-Avon, Solihull and Coventry.

== History ==
The district was formed on 1 April 1974 under the Local Government Act 1972. The new district was formed through the merger of four former districts, which were all abolished at the same time:

- Kenilworth Urban District
- Royal Leamington Spa Municipal Borough
- Warwick Municipal Borough
- Warwick Rural District

The new district was named Warwick after the county town.

Proposals to merge the district with neighbouring Stratford-on-Avon District were put forward in 2021 and provisionally agreed, before eventually being abandoned in April 2022.

== Abolition ==
Under current local government reorganisation plans, all district councils in Warwickshire, as well as the county council, will be abolished in 2028, with the district forming part of a new South Warwickshire unitary authority, also including the area of the Stratford-on-Avon District.

== Governance ==
Warwick District Council

Type
- Type: Non-metropolitan district

Leadership
- Chair: Pam Redford, Conservative since 13 May 2026
- Leader: Ian Davison, Green since 17 May 2023
- Chief Executive: Chris Elliott since 2006

Structure
- Seats: 44 councillors
- Graph of the party split among 44 seats.
- Political groups: Administration (14) Green (14) Other parties (30) Liberal Democrats (9) Labour (7) Conservative (5) Whitnash Residents (3) Independent (6)
- Length of term: 4 years

Elections
- Voting system: First past the post
- Last election: 4 May 2023

Meeting place
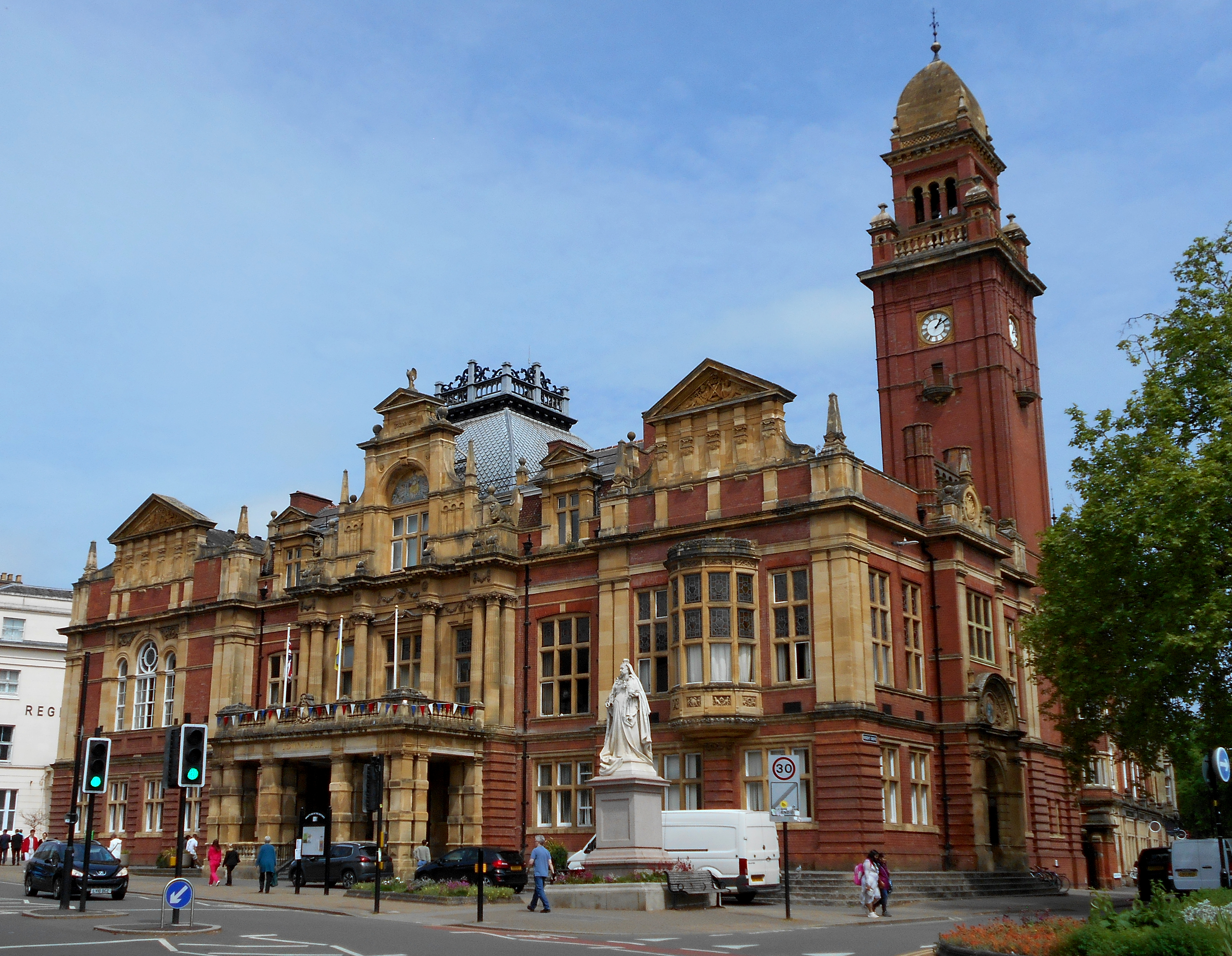
- Town Hall, The Parade, Leamington Spa, CV32 4AT

Website
- www.warwickdc.gov.uk

Warwick District Council provides district-level services. County-level services are provided by Warwickshire County Council. The whole district is also covered by civil parishes, which form a third tier of local government.

=== Political control ===
The council has been under no overall control since 2019. Following the 2023 election a coalition of the Greens and Labour formed to run the council, led by Green councillor Ian Davison. However, this partnership collapsed in November 2026 after a national Labour directive ordering councillors to withdraw from coalitions with the Greens over their national "Zionism is Racism" policy. The Greens subsequently continued to lead the council as a minority administration.

The first election to the council was held in 1973, initially operating as a shadow authority alongside the outgoing councils before coming into its powers on 1 April 1974. Since 1974 political control of the council has been as follows:

| Party in control | Years |
|---|---|
| No overall control | 1974–1976 |
| Conservative | 1976–1995 |
| No overall control | 1995–2007 |
| Conservative | 2007–2019 |
| No overall control | 2019–present |

=== Leadership ===
The leaders of the council since 1974 have been:

| Councillor | Party | From | To |
|---|---|---|---|
| Ken Rawnsley | Conservative | 1974 | May 1991 |
| Tony Dalton | Conservative | May 1991 | May 1995 |
| Ian Dove | Labour | 1995 | Apr 2000 |
| Margaret Begg | Liberal Democrats | 19 Apr 2000 | May 2001 |
| Ian Dove | Labour | May 2001 | Apr 2002 |
| Bob Crowther | Labour | 24 Apr 2002 | 2007 |
| Michael Coker | Conservative | 16 May 2007 | 2008 |
| Michael Doody | Conservative | 14 May 2008 | 4 Dec 2013 |
| Andrew Mobbs | Conservative | 4 Dec 2013 | May 2019 |
| Andrew Day | Conservative | 15 May 2019 | May 2023 |
| Ian Davison | Green | 17 May 2023 | |

=== Composition ===
Following the 2023 election, and subsequent changes of allegiance and by-elections up to November 2026, the composition of the council is:

| Party | Seats |
|---|---|
| Green | 14 |
| Labour | 7 |
| Liberal Democrats | 9 |
| Conservative | 5 |
| Whitnash Residents | 3 |
| Independent | 6 |
| Total | 44 |

=== Elections ===
Since the last boundary changes in 2019 the council has comprised 44 councillors representing 17 wards with each ward electing one, two or three councillors. Elections are held every four years.

=== Premises ===
Council meetings are usually held at Leamington Spa Town Hall on The Parade, which had been built in 1884 for the old Leamington Borough Council, and which is also the council's official registered address. The council also has offices at 1 Saltisford Office Park in Warwick, and the customer services reception is at the Royal Pump Rooms in Leamington Spa.

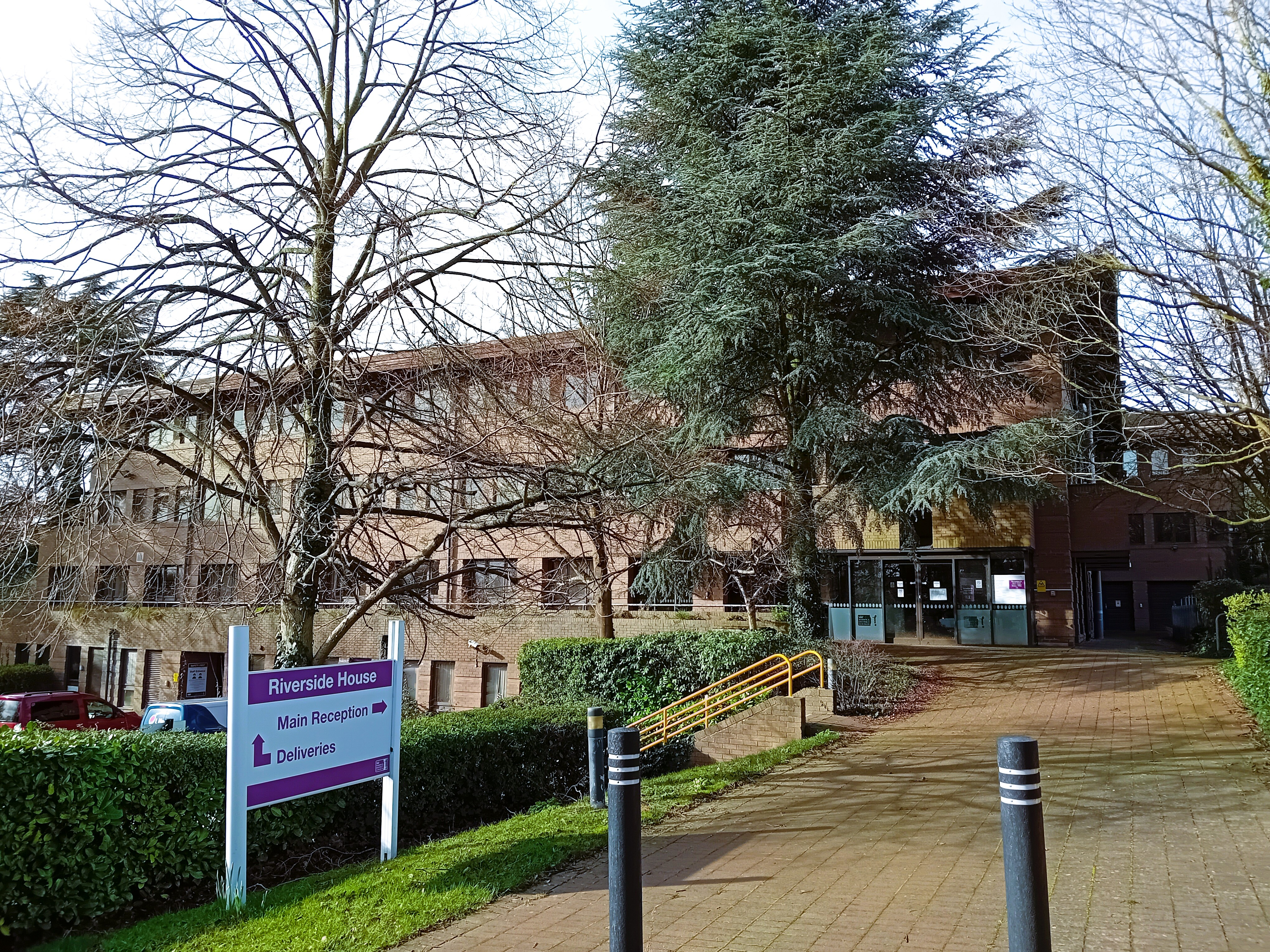
Riverside House, Milverton Hill, Leamington Spa: Council's main offices from 2000 to 2024, since demolished

From 2000 until 2024, the council had its main offices at Riverside House on Milverton Hill in Leamington, close to the River Leam, which had been built in 1984 as the headquarters of the Leamington Spa Building Society, and was subsequently bought by the council in 2000. Riverside House closed in 2024 and was subsequently sold and demolished.

=== The environment ===
On 27 June 2019 the elected members at the Full Council meeting declared a "climate emergency" in response to ongoing global climate change. The council aims to become carbon neutral by 2025, whilst trying to make the whole district carbon neutral by 2030. On 20 January 2020 it was announced that electric cars would be given free parking in council car parks. On 4 February of that year it was proposed by the council group leaders to increase council tax by around £1 a week on Band D properties to create £3 million per year. This would be ring-fenced for environmental purposes. If this proposal was accepted by the other councillors then a district wide referendum would have been held on 7 May to decide if the public accept it. On 26 February the full council unanimously agreed the proposal, triggering the 7 May referendum, – which was put back to 6 May 2021, due to the 2020 COVID-19 pandemic. As of April 2022 the referendum has not yet occurred and no date has been set.

== Demography ==
| Ethnic Group | 2001 | | 2011 | |
| Ethnic Group | Number | % | Number | % |
|---|---|---|---|---|
| White: British | 111,043 | 88.19% | 114,739 | 83.36% |
| White: Irish | 2,525 | 2.01% | 2,146 | 1.56% |
| White: Gypsy or Irish Traveller | | | 41 | 0.03% |
| White: Other | 3,448 | 2.74% | 5,789 | 4.21% |
| White: Total | 117,016 | 92.94% | 122,715 | 89.15% |
| Asian or Asian British: Indian | 5,218 | 4.14% | 6,745 | 4.90% |
| Asian or Asian British: Pakistani | 222 | 0.18% | 480 | 0.35% |
| Asian or Asian British: Bangladeshi | 22 | 0.02% | 69 | 0.05% |
| Asian or Asian British: Chinese | 521 | 0.41% | 1,155 | 0.84% |
| Asian or Asian British: Other Asian | 435 | 0.35% | 1,496 | 1.09% |
| Asian or Asian British: Total | 6,418 | 5.10% | 9,945 | 7.22% |
| Black or Black British: Caribbean | 360 | 0.29% | 389 | 0.28% |
| Black or Black British: African | 168 | 0.13% | 474 | 0.34% |
| Black or Black British: Other Black | 59 | 0.05% | 110 | 0.08% |
| Black or Black British: Total | 587 | 0.47% | 973 | 0.71% |
| Mixed: White and Black Caribbean | 506 | 0.40% | 861 | 0.63% |
| Mixed: White and Black African | 93 | 0.07% | 233 | 0.17% |
| Mixed: White and Asian | 503 | 0.40% | 1,070 | 0.78% |
| Mixed: Other Mixed | 281 | 0.22% | 639 | 0.46% |
| Mixed: Total | 1,383 | 1.10% | 2,803 | 2.04% |
| Other: Arab | | | 231 | 0.17% |
| Other: Any other ethnic group | | | 981 | 0.71% |
| Other: Total | 504 | 0.40% | 1,212 | 0.88% |
| BAME: Total | 8,892 | 7.06% | 14,933 | 10.85% |
| Total | 125,908 | 100.00% | 137,648 | 100.00% |

| Religion | 2001 | | 2011 | |
| Religion | Number | % | Number | % |
|---|---|---|---|---|
| Christian | 89,763 | 71.28% | 80,185 | 58.25% |
| Buddhist | 347 | 0.28% | 521 | 0.38% |
| Hindu | 848 | 0.67% | 1,633 | 1.19% |
| Jewish | 207 | 0.16% | 268 | 0.19% |
| Muslim | 630 | 0.50% | 1,299 | 0.94% |
| Sikh | 4,239 | 3.37% | 5,373 | 3.90% |
| Other religion | 355 | 0.28% | 531 | 0.39% |
| No religion | 20,494 | 16.27% | 37,859 | 27.50% |
| Religion not stated | 9,051 | 7.19% | 9,979 | 7.25% |
| Total | 125,934 | 100.00% | 137,648 | 100.00% |

== Travel, education and healthcare ==
The district has six railway stations – Warwick, Warwick Parkway, Leamington Spa, Kenilworth, Hatton and Lapworth. Regular bus services run between Warwick, Leamington and Kenilworth and onwards to Coventry, Stratford upon Avon and the University of Warwick. The Grand Union Canal flows through the district and the M40 motorway also passes through. Right on the edge of the district is Coventry Airport.

National Health Service general healthcare is provided by South Warwickshire NHS Foundation Trust and mental health care by Coventry and Warwickshire Partnership NHS Trust. Local hospitals include Warwick Hospital, the Leamington Spa Hospital, St Michael's Hospital and the Warwickshire Nuffield Hospital (non-NHS, part of the Nuffield Health group) Historic hospitals included St Michael's Leper Hospital, Warneford Hospital and Central Hospital. In 2021 a COVID-19 "mega lab" was opened in the town, named after English chemist Rosalind Franklin. The largest laboratory of its kind in the UK, it failed to reach projected performance goals and closed without ceremony in January 2023. Social services and fostering are dealt with on a countywide basis by Warwickshire County Council.

== Freedom of district ==
- MoD Kineton: 4 April 2013.
- On 26 November 2013 the freedom of the district was bestowed on the Royal Regiment of Fusiliers following a parade through Royal Leamington Spa.

== Towns and parishes ==
The district is divided into 32 civil parishes, which cover the whole area. The parish councils for Kenilworth, Royal Leamington Spa, Warwick and Whitnash have declared their parishes to be towns, allowing them to take the style "town council". The small parish of Bushwood has a parish meeting rather than a parish council. The parishes are:

- Ashow
- Baddesley Clinton, Baginton, Barford, Beausale, Haseley, Honiley and Wroxall, Bishops Tachbrook, Blackdown, Bubbenhall, Budbrooke, Burton Green, Bushwood
- Cubbington
- Eathorpe
- Hatton, Hunningham
- Kenilworth
- Lapworth, Leek Wootton and Guy's Cliffe
- Norton Lindsey
- Offchurch, Old Milverton
- Radford Semele, Rowington, Royal Leamington Spa
- Sherbourne, Shrewley, Stoneleigh
- Wappenbury, Warwick, Wasperton, Weston Under Wetherley, Whitnash

== Gallery ==
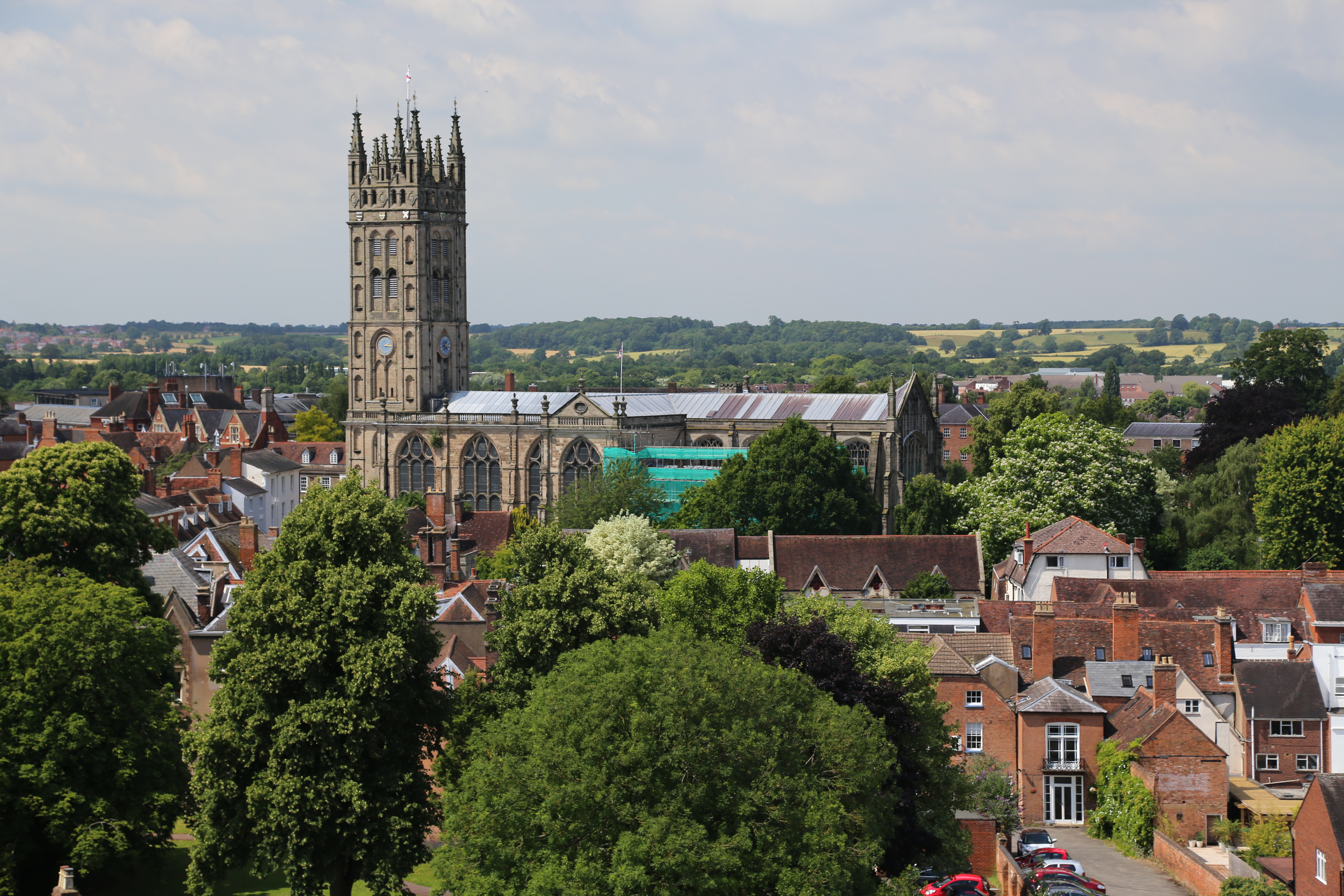
Warwick, the county town of Warwickshire and the second-largest settlement in the district

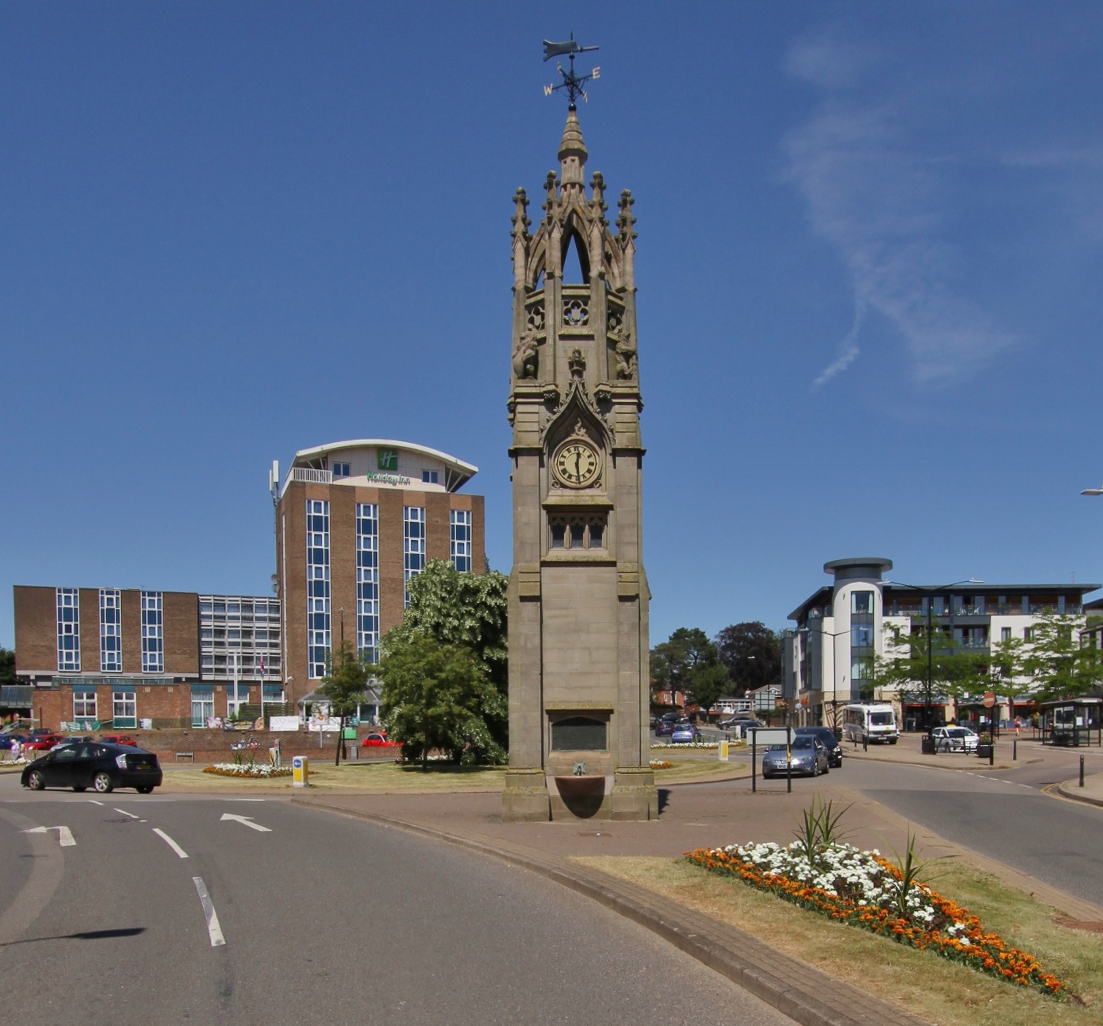
Kenilworth, the third-largest settlement in the district and close to the border with Coventry

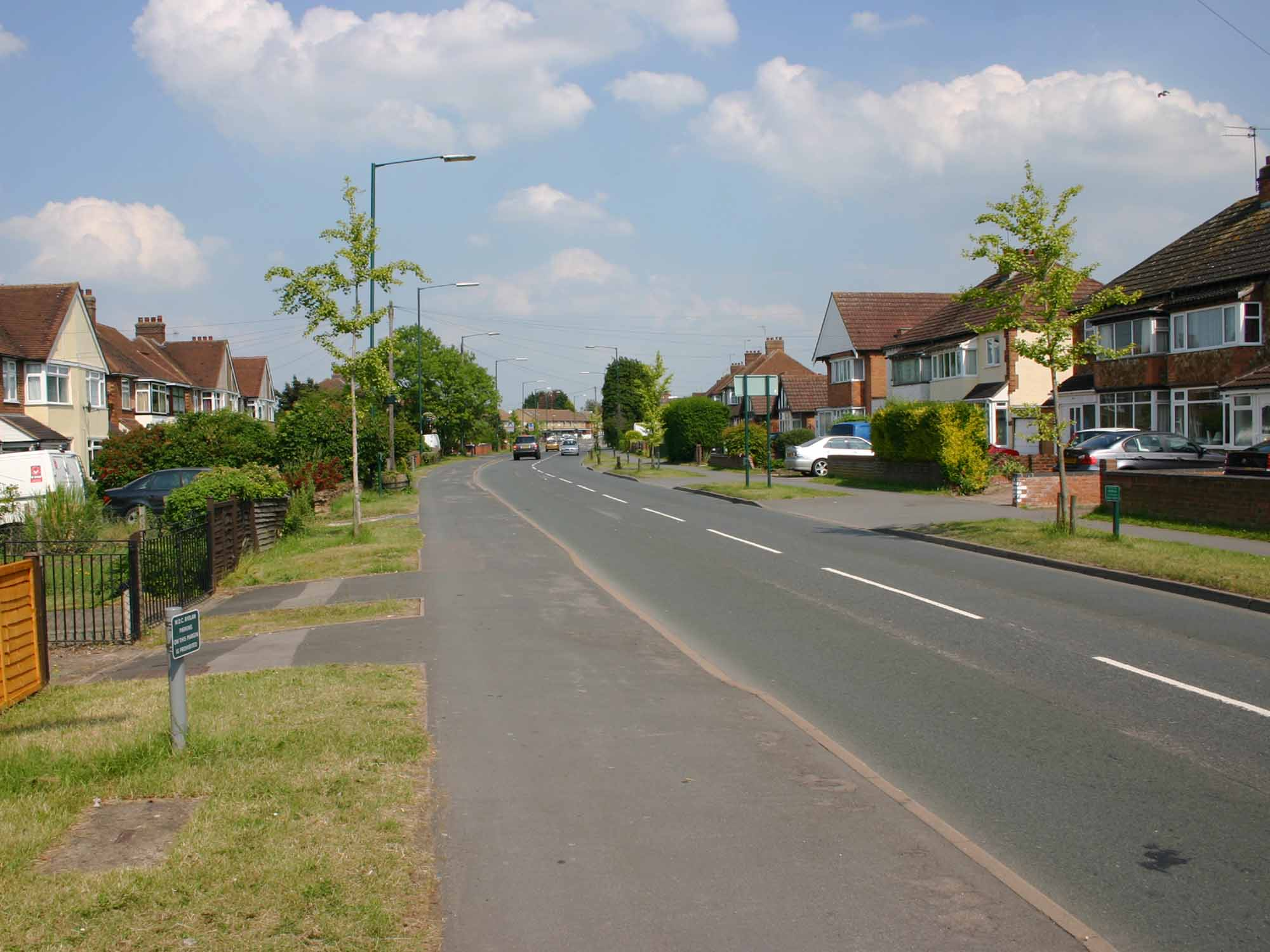
Whitnash, the fourth-largest settlement in the district

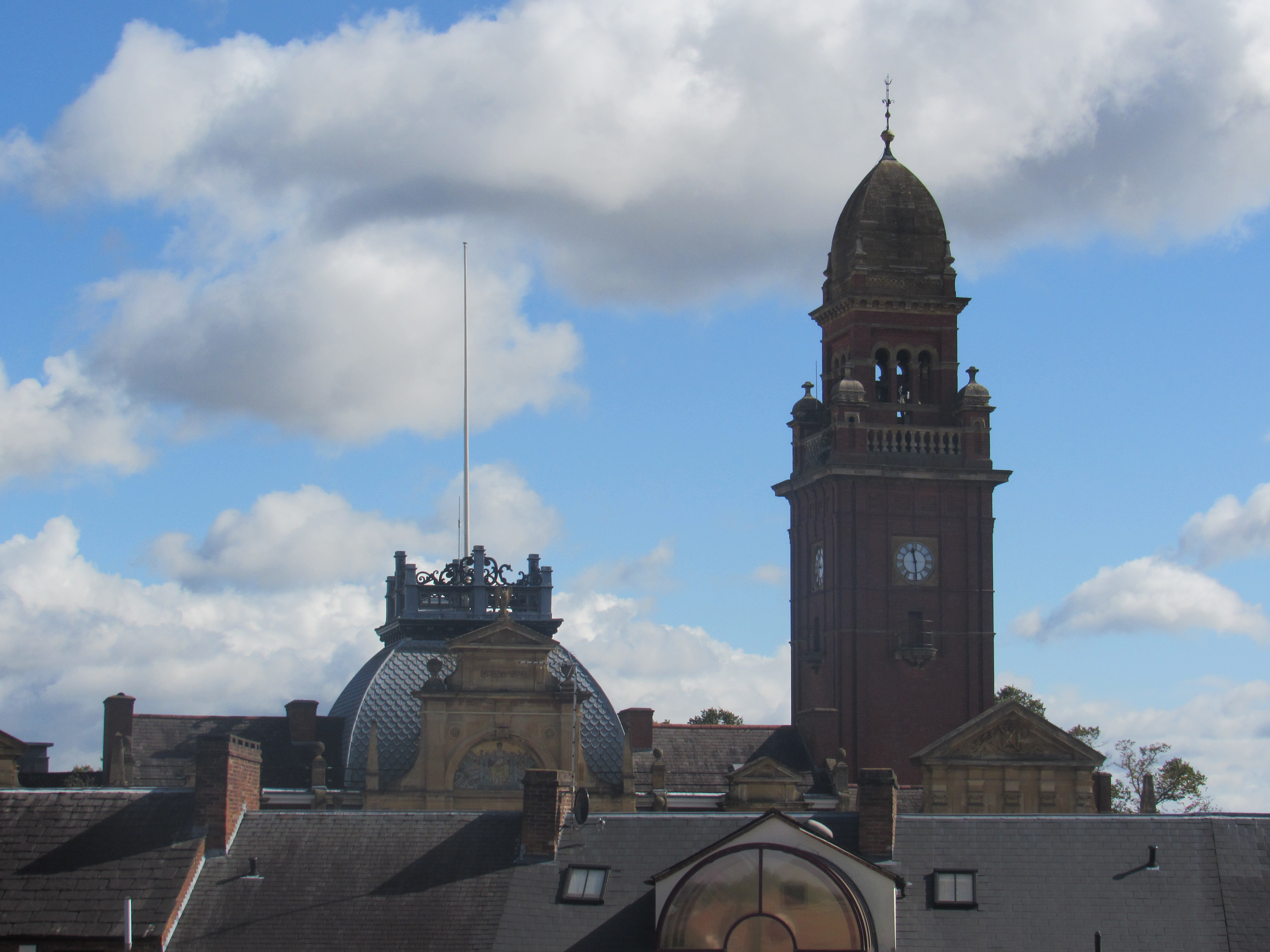
Leamington Spa Town Hall, the meeting place of both Leamington Spa Town Council and Warwick District Council

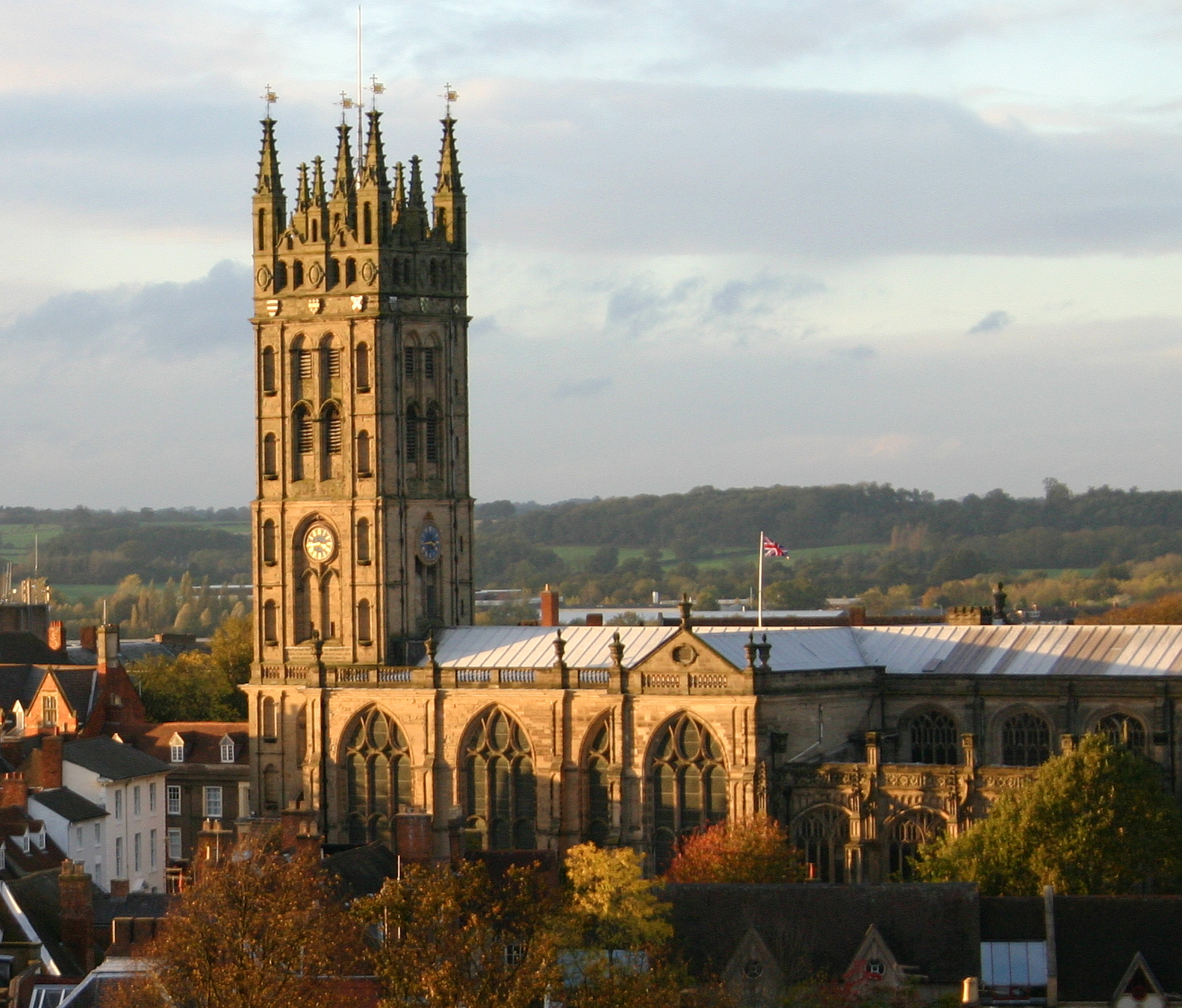
Collegiate Church of St Mary, the parish church of Warwick and one of the largest churches in Warwickshire

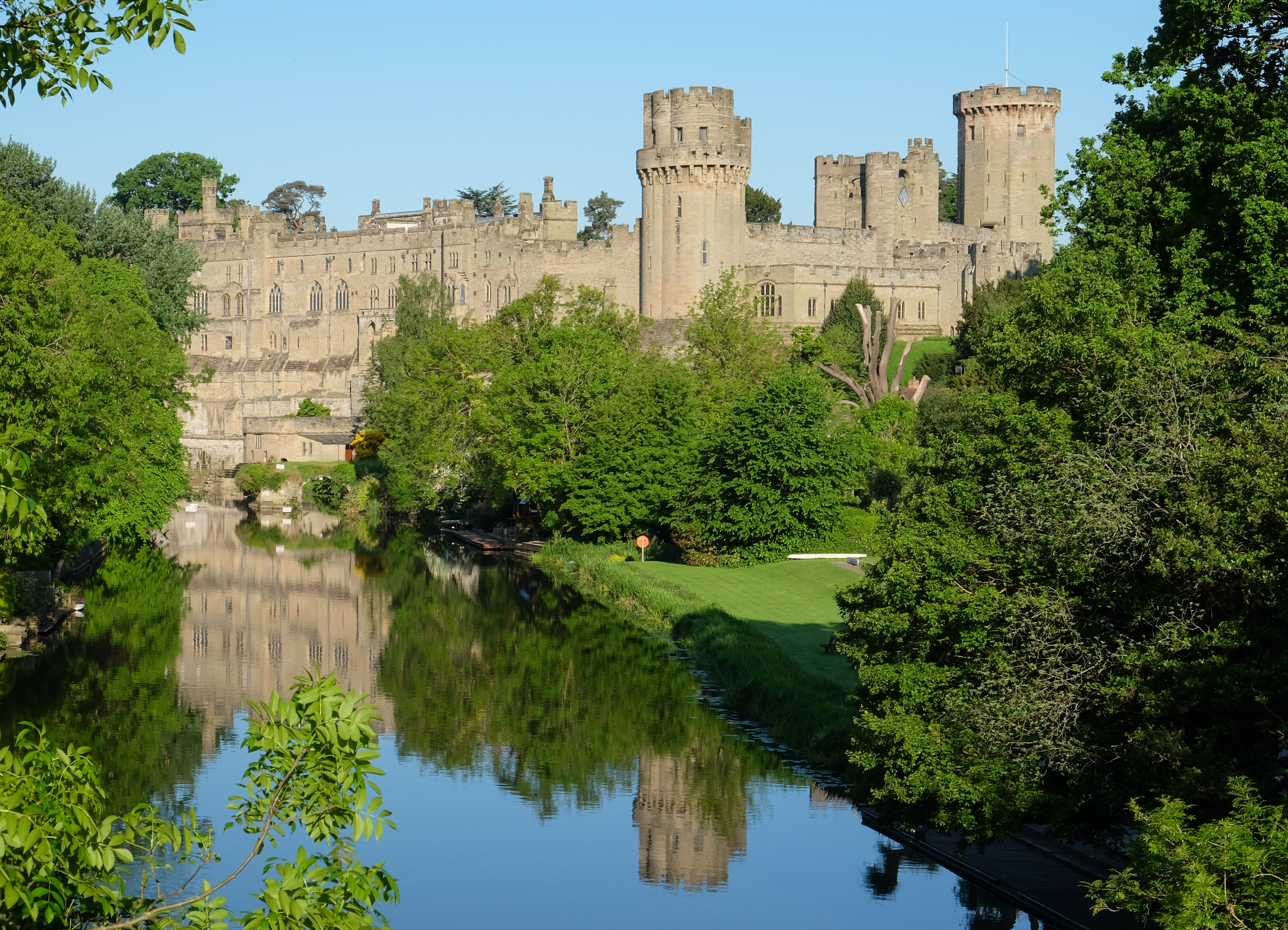
Warwick Castle, Warwick is the historic castle of the town and one of its oldest landmarks.

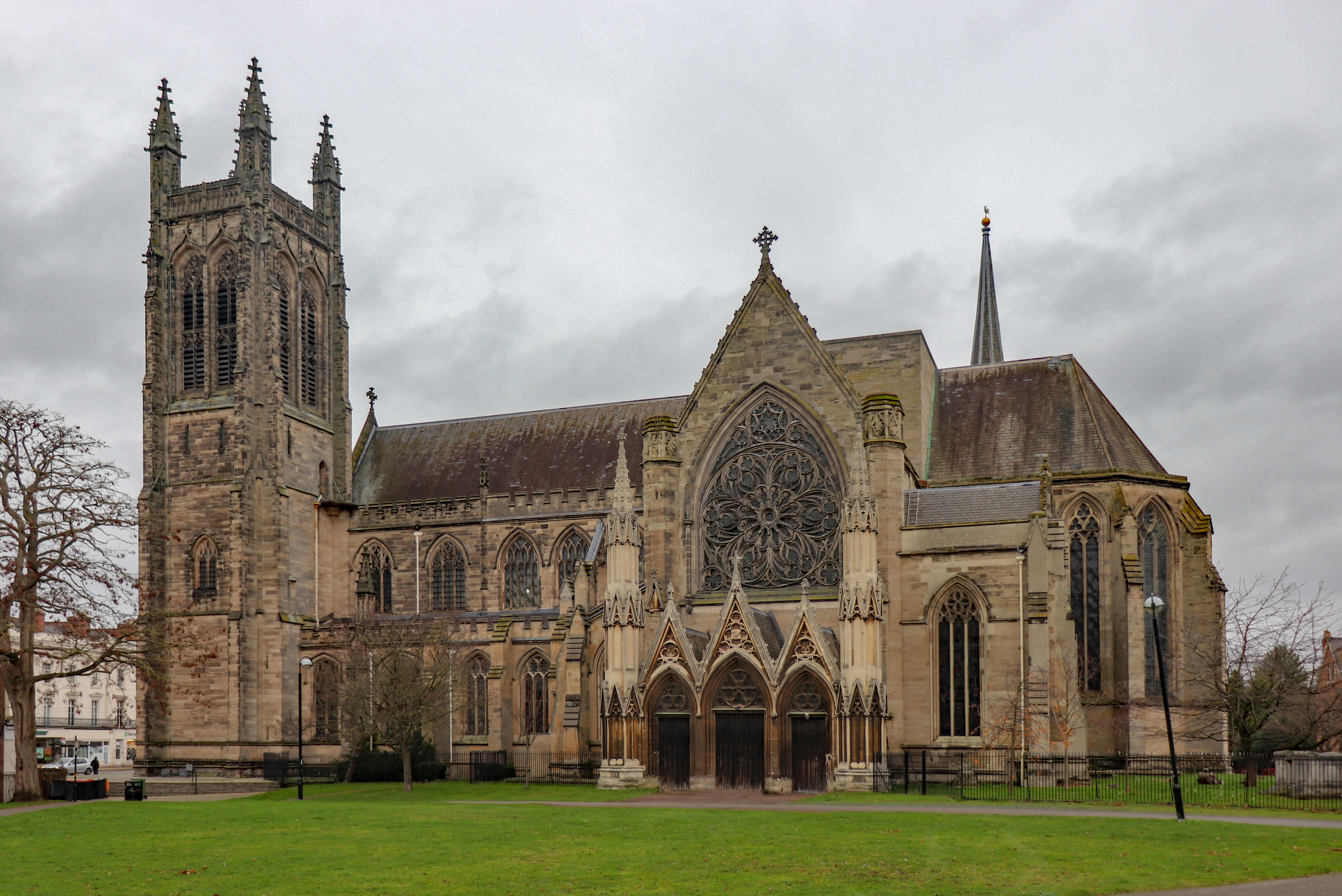
All Saints Church, Leamington Spa, the parish church of Leamington Spa and a grade-II* listed building

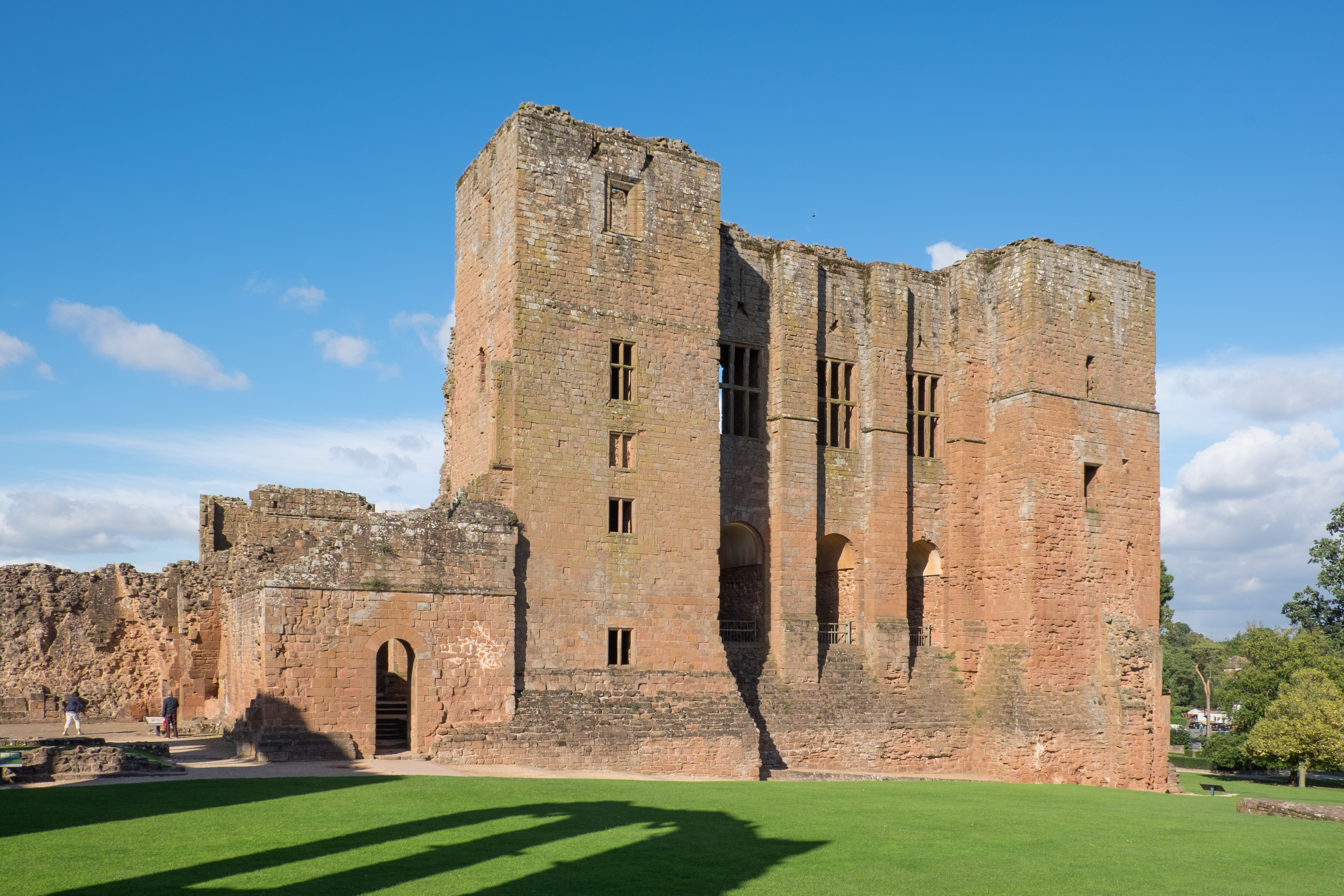
Kenilworth Castle, the historic castle in the market town of Kenilworth

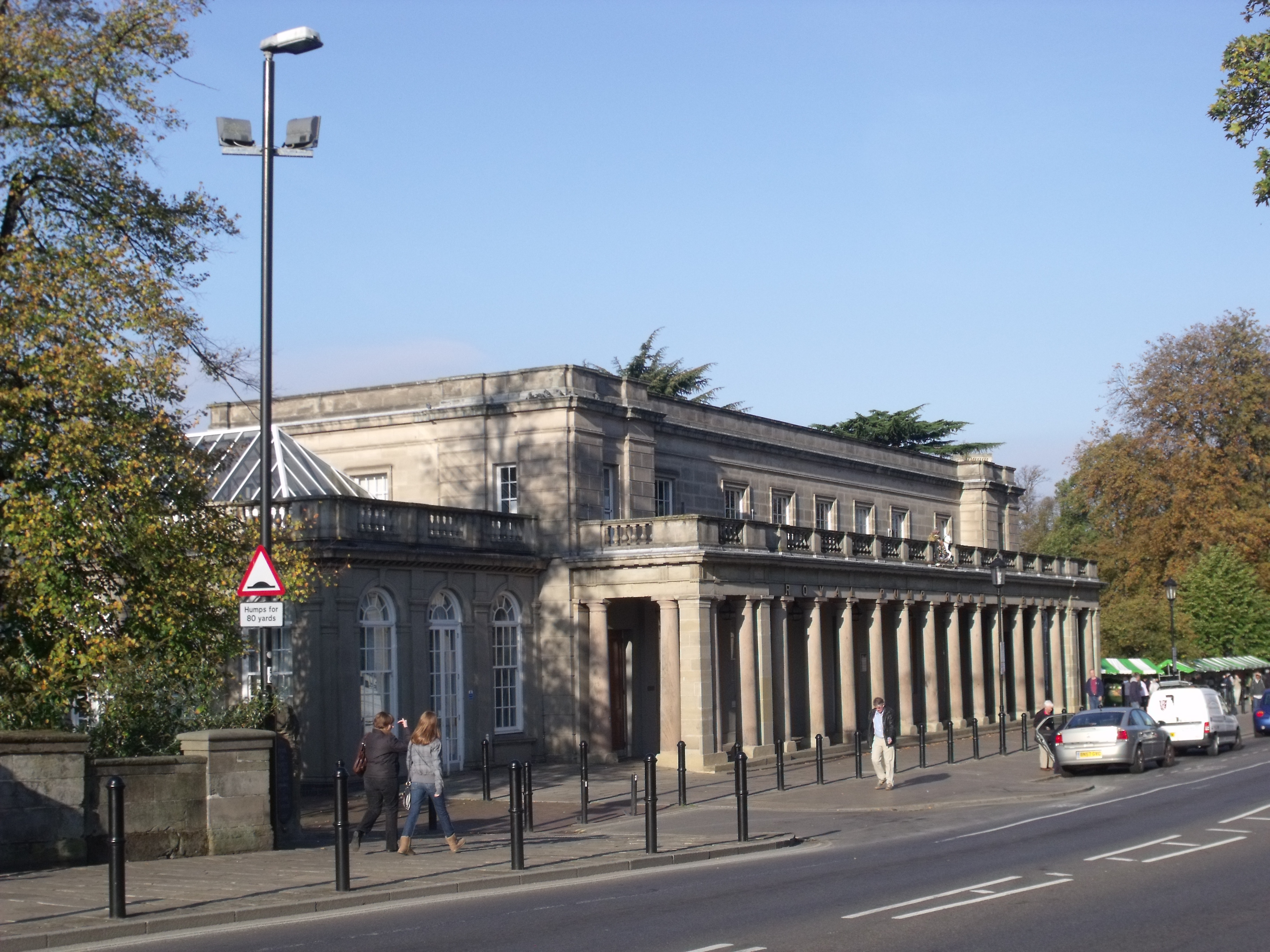
The Royal Pump Rooms and Baths, Leamington Spa which house the spa baths and give Leamington Spa its status as a spa town.

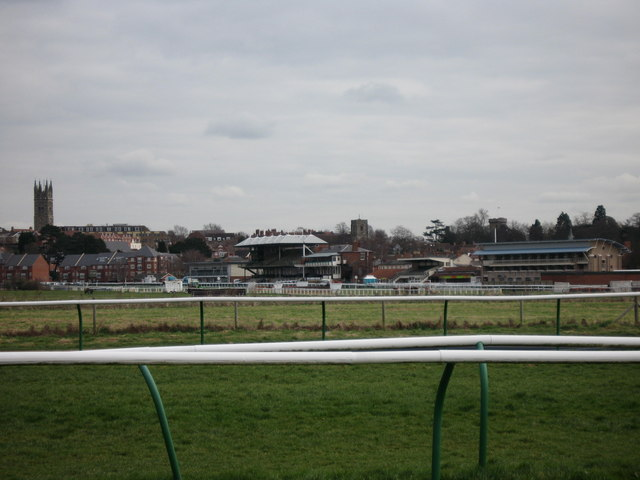
Warwick Racecourse in Warwick, which is a horse-racing track

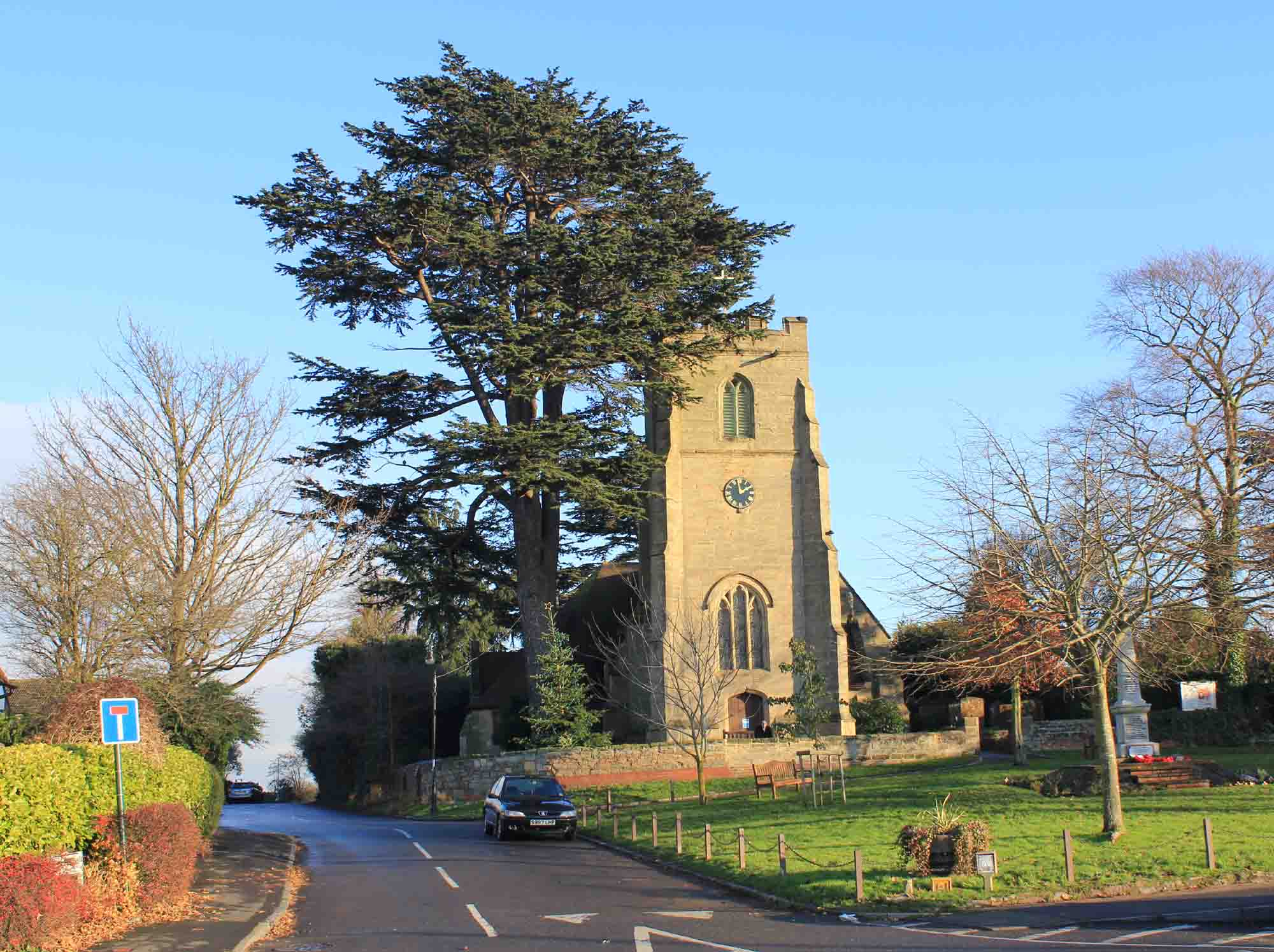
Whitnash parish church and Warwick Gates.

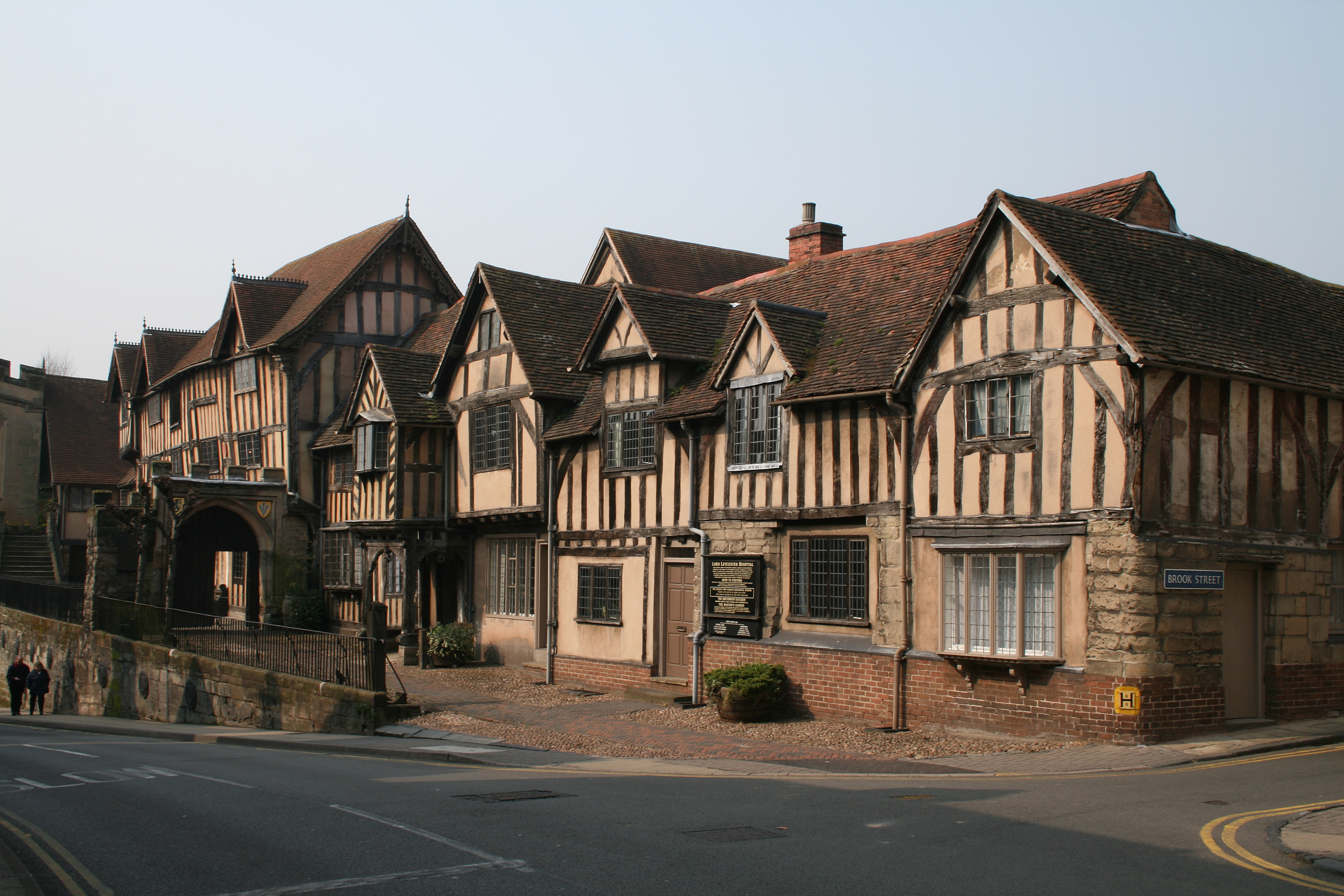
Lord Leycester Hospital, an old hospital in Warwick

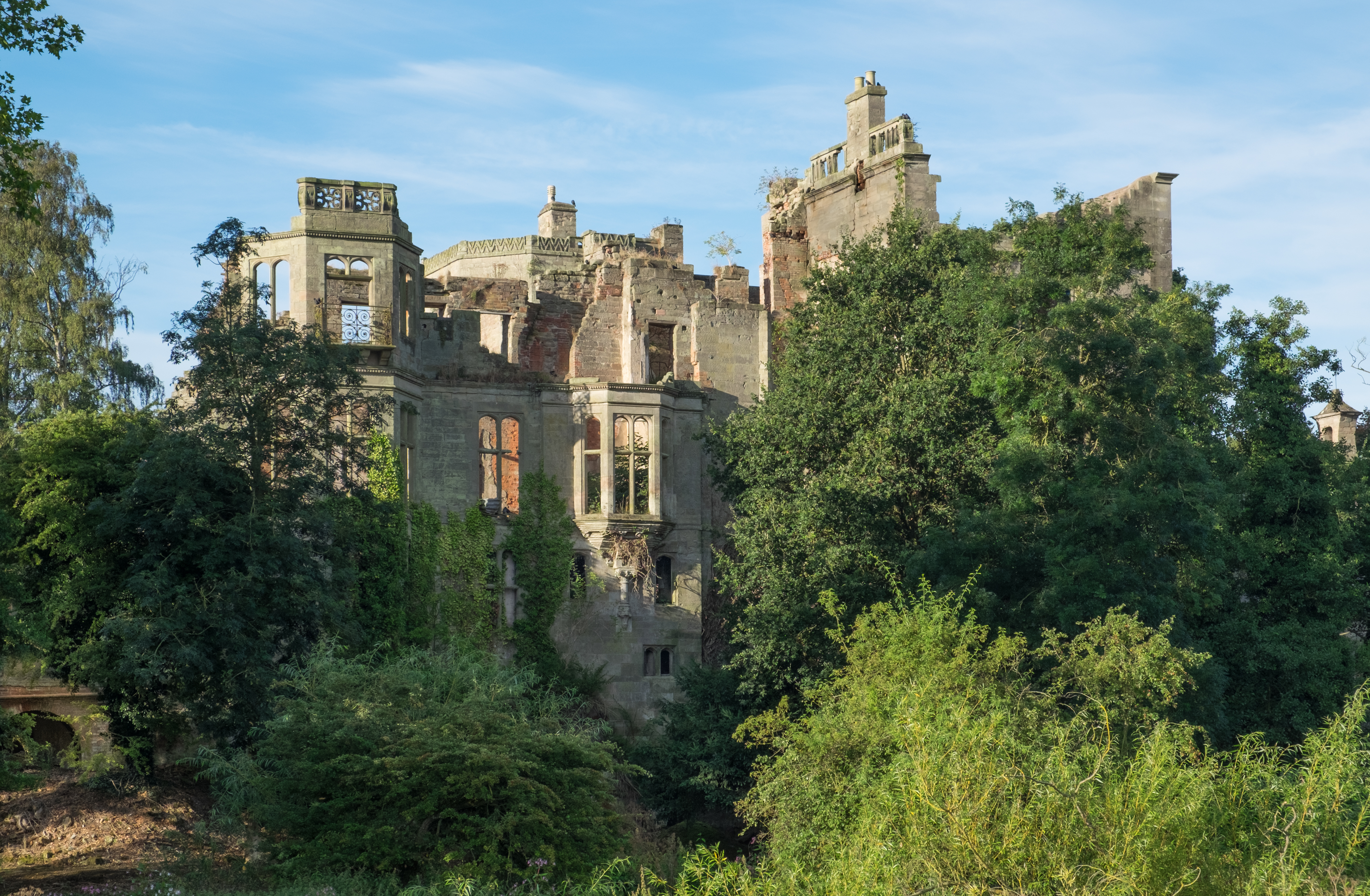
Guy's Cliffe House in the north of Warwick is a ruined Gothic house.
