= Budbrooke Barracks =

- Budbrooke
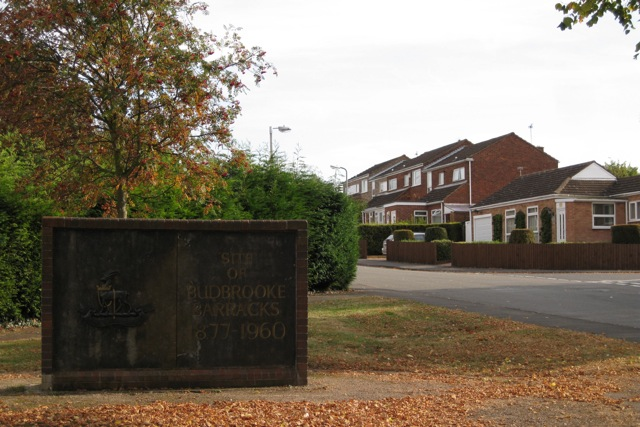
- Commemorative wall at Hampton Magna

Site information
- Type: Barracks
- Owner: Ministry of Defence
- Operator: British Army

Location
- Location within Warwickshire
- Coordinates: 52.28433°N 1.61882°W

Site history
- Built: 1877
- Built for: War Office
- In use: 1877-1960

Garrison information
- Occupants: Royal Warwickshire Regiment

Budbrooke Barracks was a military installation near Budbrooke in Warwickshire, England.

== History ==
The barracks were built on agricultural land in 1877. Their creation took place as part of the Cardwell Reforms which encouraged the localisation of British military forces. The barracks became the depot for the two battalions of the 6th (1st Warwickshire) Regiment of Foot. Following the Childers Reforms, the regiment evolved to become the Royal Warwickshire Regiment with its depot in the barracks in 1881.

St Michael's Church became the battalion church at that time. Many recruits enlisted at the barracks at the start of the First World War. The barracks were demoted to the status of out-station to the Forester Brigade depot at Glen Parva Barracks in 1958, the last recruits were accepted in March 1960 and the barracks closed later that year. The site has since been developed as the village of Hampton Magna.
