= St Michael's Hospital, Warwick =

St Michael's Hospital
- Coventry and Warwickshire Partnership NHS Trust
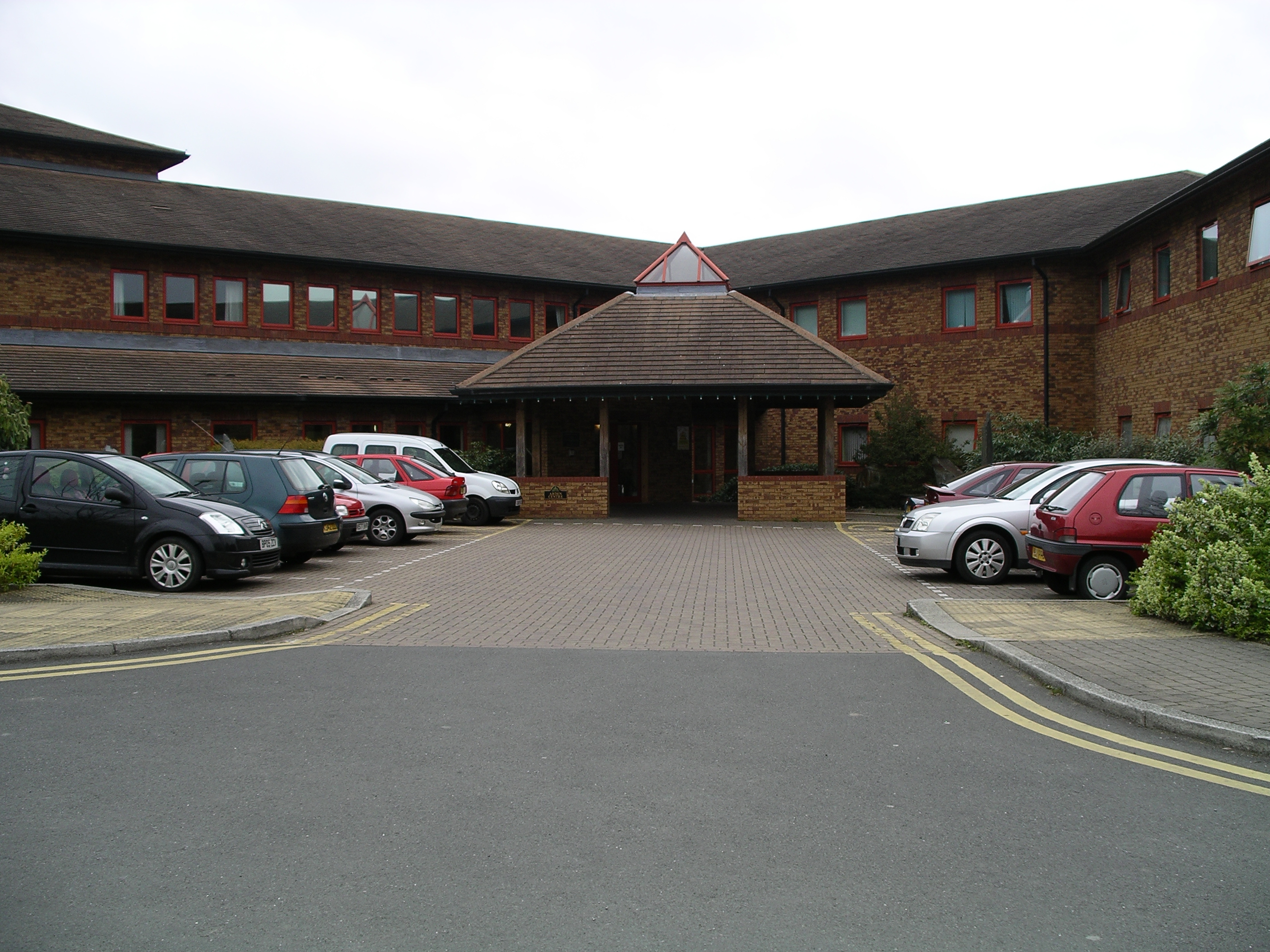
- The main entrance

- Shown in Warwickshire

Geography
- Location: St. Michael's Road, Warwick, Warwickshire, England
- Coordinates: 52.2887°N 1.5945°W

Organisation
- Care system: NHS
- Type: Specialist

Services
- Emergency department: No
- Speciality: Psychiatric hospital

History
- Founded: 1995

Links
- Website: www.covwarkpt.nhs.uk/st-michaels
- Lists: Hospitals in England

St Michael's Hospital is a National Health Service psychiatric hospital situated in Warwick, Warwickshire, England run by Coventry and Warwickshire Partnership NHS Trust.

== History ==
The hospital was established in 1995, largely to replace the outdated Central Hospital in the nearby village of Hatton. The hospital was officially opened by Queen Elizabeth II on 8 November 1996. A new psychotherapy unit known as The Pines (the wards are generally named after trees) opened at the hospital in April 2004.

== Services ==
There is an Education Centre Library and tennis court on site.

== Gallery ==
Views from the surrounding roads

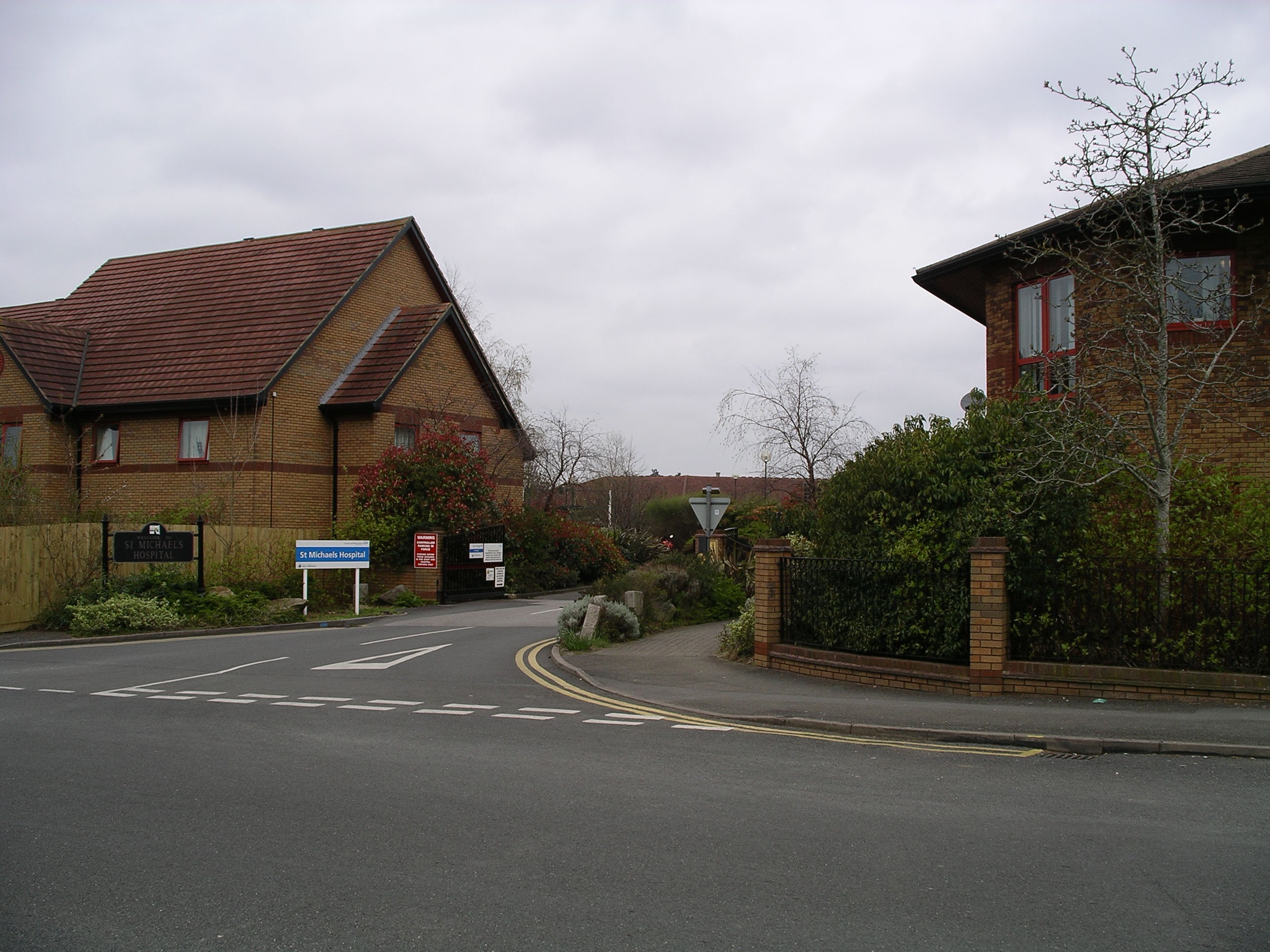
The entrance to the hospital's car park on St Michaels Road

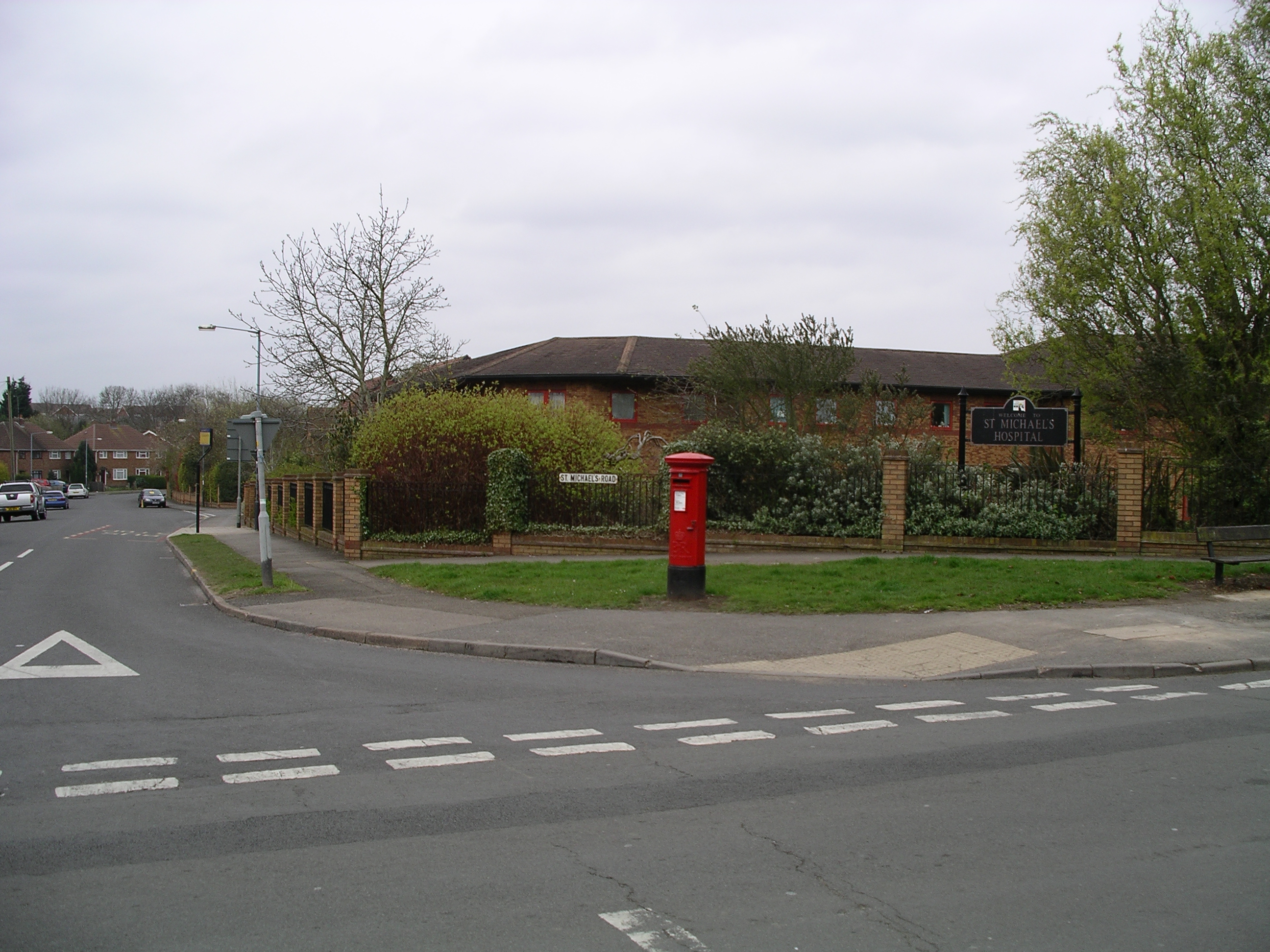
From the T-junction of St Michael's Road and Cape Road

== See also ==
- List of hospitals in England
