= Hatton, Warwickshire =

Village in Warwickshire, England

Coordinates: 52.3°N 1.645°W

Hatton
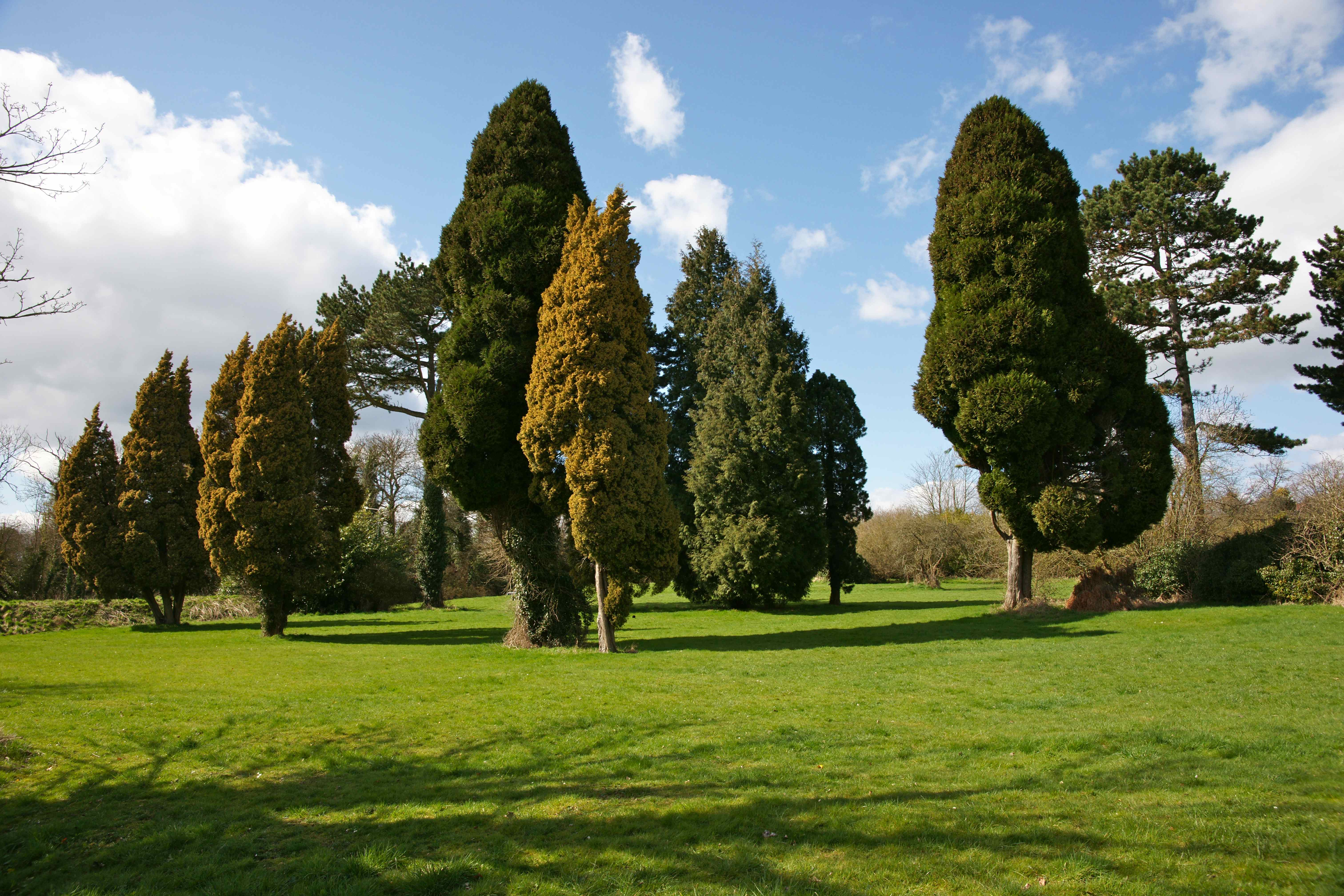
- The former inmate cemetery of Central Hospital

- Location within Warwickshire
- Population: 2,319 (2011 census)
- OS grid reference: SP2467
- Civil parish: Hatton
- District: Warwick
- Shire county: Warwickshire
- Region: West Midlands
- Country: England
- Sovereign state: United Kingdom
- Post town: WARWICK
- Postcode district: CV35
- Dialling code: 01926
- Police: Warwickshire
- Fire: Warwickshire
- Ambulance: West Midlands
- UK Parliament: Warwick and Leamington

Hatton is a village and civil parish about 3.5 miles (6 km) west-northwest of Warwick, in the Warwick District of Warwickshire in England. The parish had a population of 1,078 at the 2001 Census, increasing to 2,319 at the 2011 Census. Notable landmarks include Hatton Locks, a series of 21 locks on the Grand Union Canal. The flight spans less than 2 miles (3.2 km) of canal, and has a total rise of 45 metres (148 ft).

== Hatton Estate ==
The vast country estate owned by the Arkwright family features a shopping village, children's nursery, technology site (Hatton Country World) and a public house, The Hatton Arms. The latter was historically noted for its regular large assemblies of motorcycles and today is a tourist dining destination due to its proximity to the flight of canal locks.

== Hatton Park development ==
A former psychiatric hospital (Central Hospital) that has been turned into a large housing estate while still preserving the original Victorian buildings. Today the site is served by a village community Hall and corner shop. The development is due to be expanded with 150 dwellings by Warwick District Council and developer Taylor Wimpey under the H28 project. Other facilities in the local area include The Falcon Inn and Shell Garage, further away from the village centre.

== Transport ==
Hatton is close to the M40 motorway and is also served by the small, unstaffed Hatton railway station. The station lies on the Chiltern Main Line between Birmingham Snow Hill and London Marylebone and a small branch line to Stratford-upon-Avon. Services from this station are run by Chiltern Railways and West Midlands Trains. There are direct services to Stratford-upon-Avon and intermediate stations, Warwick, Leamington Spa and stations to London Marylebone and Birmingham Snow Hill. The towpath of the Grand Union Canal is a long-distance walk as well as a route for narrowboaters and canoeists. Additionally Warwick Parkway railway station is the nearest alternative with park and ride facilities on the western outskirts of Warwick. It also serves the village of Budbrooke and the Hatton Park development.
