= 2023 Warwick District Council election =

Local election in Warwickshire, England

- 4 May 2023

All 44 seats to Warwick District Council 23 seats needed for a majority
- Turnout: 37.3%

	First party	Second party	Third party
Leader	Ian Davison	Mini Mangat	Alan Boad
Party	Green	Labour	Liberal Democrats
Last election	8 seats, 22.5%	5 seats, 19.5%	9 seats, 23.5%
Seats before	8	5	9
Seats won	14	11	10
Seat change	▲6	▲6	▲1
Popular vote	27,789	22,642	19,061
Percentage	26.3%	21.4%	18.1%
Swing	▲3.8%	▲2.4%	▼5.4%
	Fourth party	Fifth party	Sixth party
Leader	Andrew Day	Judy Falp
Party	Conservative	Whitnash Residents	Independent
Last election	19 seats, 29.4%	3 seats, 3.9%	N/A
Seats before	16	3	3
Seats won	6	3	0
Seat change	▼13	0	Steady
Popular vote	32,181	3,587
Percentage	30.5%	3.4%
Swing	▲1.1%	▼0.5%
- Winner of each seat at the 2023 Warwick District Council election

- Composition of the council after the election
Leader before election
Andrew Day
Conservative
No overall control
Leader after election
Ian Davison
Green
No overall control

The 2023 Warwick District Council election took place on 4 May 2023 to elect members of Warwick District Council in Warwickshire, England. This took place on the same day as other local elections in England. The council remained without control of any party.

== Summary ==
The council was under no overall control prior to the election. The Conservatives were the largest party and they formed a minority administration with local party the Whitnash Residents Association. Following the election the council remained under no overall control, with the Greens becoming the largest party, having won fourteen seats. The Conservatives were reduced to just six seats, making them the fourth largest party after Labour and the Liberal Democrats.

A coalition of the Greens and Labour subsequently formed, with Green group leader Ian Davison being appointed leader of the council at the subsequent annual council meeting on 17 May 2023, with Labour councillor Chris King serving as deputy leader (the previous Labour group leader Mini Mangat had lost her seat at the election).

== Overall results ==
2023 Warwick District Council election
Party	Candidates	Seats	Gains	Losses	Net gain/loss	Seats %	Votes %	Votes	+/−
Green	37	14	6	0	▲6	31.8	26.3	27,789	+3.8
Labour	30	11	7	1	▲6	25.0	21.4	22,642	+1.9
Liberal Democrats	41	10	1	0	▲1	22.7	18.1	19,061	–5.4
Conservative	44	6	0	13	▼13	13.6	30.5	32,181	+1.1
Whitnash Residents	3	3	0	0	Steady	6.8	3.4	3,587	–0.5
UKIP	1	0	0	0	Steady	0.0	0.1	122	–1.1
Heritage	1	0	0	0	Steady	0.0	0.1	116	N/A
Reform	1	0	0	0	Steady	0.0	0.1	73	N/A

== Ward results ==
=== Bishop's Tachbrook ===
Bishop's Tachbrook (2 seats)
Party	Candidate	Votes	%	±%
Labour	Matt Collins	676	43.3	+3.1
Conservative	Andrew Day*	668	42.8	–6.6
Labour	Deirdre Fox	663	42.5	N/A
Conservative	Matthew Greene	627	40.2	–0.8
Green	Janet Alty	161	10.3	–5.4
Green	Darren Skilton	105	6.7	–5.7
Liberal Democrats	Nicola Lomas	65	4.2	–9.3
Liberal Democrats	Kelvin Lambert	59	3.8	N/A
Turnout		1,561	33.3	–0.6
Registered electors		4,681		
Rejected ballots		9	0.6	
Labour gain from Conservative				
Conservative hold				

=== Budbrooke ===
Budbrooke (2 seats)
Party	Candidate	Votes	%	±%
Conservative	Jan Matecki*	905	41.4	–7.4
Conservative	Peter Phillips	864	39.5	–16.1
Labour	John Barrott	806	36.8	+20.8
Liberal Democrats	Gerry Jackson	749	34.2	N/A
Green	Sara Lever	349	16.0	–10.5
Green	John Dearing	300	13.7	–9.5
Turnout		2,188	42.1	+0.3
Registered electors		5,191		
Rejected ballots		42	1.9	
Conservative hold				
Conservative hold				

=== Cubbington & Leek Wootton ===
Cubbington & Leek Wootton (2 seats)
Party	Candidate	Votes	%	±%
Liberal Democrats	Josh Payne	697	41.0	N/A
Conservative	Pamela Redford*	633	37.2	–14.6
Conservative	Trevor Wright*	615	36.1	–15.3
Liberal Democrats	Justine Ragany	608	35.7	N/A
Labour	John Roberts	307	18.0	–6.7
Green	Elizabeth Beattie	201	11.8	–9.8
Green	Amanda Byart	187	11.0	–7.7
Turnout		1,702	38.1	+1.2
Registered electors		4,471		
Rejected ballots		5	0.3	
Liberal Democrats gain from Conservative				
Conservative hold				

=== Kenilworth Abbey & Arden ===
Kenilworth Abbey & Arden (3 seats)
Party	Candidate	Votes	%	±%
Green	David Armstrong	1,597	48.1	+25.7
Green	Kyn Aizlewood	1,535	46.2	+26.8
Conservative	Richard Hales*	1,292	38.9	–9.1
Green	John Watson	1,275	38.4	+21.3
Conservative	John Cooke*	1,262	38.0	–10.4
Conservative	Janet Gee	1,230	37.0	–10.5
Liberal Democrats	Annabell Gurney-Terry	349	10.5	–12.8
Liberal Democrats	Ederyn Williams	345	10.4	–11.3
Labour	Hannah Deacon	307	9.2	–1.6
Liberal Democrats	Timothy Macy	285	8.6	–11.4
Turnout		3,322	39.5	+1.5
Registered electors		8,411		
Rejected ballots		14	0.4	
Green gain from Conservative				
Green gain from Conservative				
Conservative hold				

=== Kenilworth Park Hill ===
Kenilworth Park Hill (3 seats)
Party	Candidate	Votes	%	±%
Green	Alistair Kennedy*	1,838	56.9	+11.2
Green	Lara Cron	1,585	49.0	–1.2
Green	Lowell Williams	1,333	41.2	–4.4
Conservative	Malcolm Graham	1,066	33.0	–3.3
Conservative	Felicity Bunker	971	30.0	–3.8
Conservative	Frances Lasok	846	26.2	–5.9
Labour	Jeremy Eastaugh	491	15.2	+6.4
Liberal Democrats	Adrian Marsh	436	13.5	+2.9
Liberal Democrats	Alan Chalmers	404	12.5	+2.1
Liberal Democrats	Silvia Fuchss	214	6.6	N/A
Turnout		3,232	41.6	–0.3
Registered electors		7,767		
Rejected ballots		9	0.3	
Green hold				
Green hold				
Green hold				

=== Kenilworth St. Johns ===
Kenilworth St. Johns (3 seats)
Party	Candidate	Votes	%	±%
Liberal Democrats	Kate Dickson*	1,948	54.3	–12.3
Liberal Democrats	Richard Dickson*	1,826	50.9	–15.9
Liberal Democrats	Andrew Milton*	1,473	41.1	–18.8
Conservative	Rik Spencer	1,166	32.5	–0.2
Green	Joe Rukin	972	27.1	N/A
Conservative	Andy Metcalf	956	26.7	–5.3
Conservative	Isabella Moore	886	24.7	–6.6
Labour	Peter Shiels	532	14.8	N/A
Turnout		3,586	46.4	+1.1
Registered electors		7,730		
Rejected ballots		20	0.6	
Liberal Democrats hold				
Liberal Democrats hold				
Liberal Democrats hold				

=== Leamington Brunswick ===
Leamington Brunswick (3 seats)
Party	Candidate	Votes	%	±%
Green	Jonathan Chilvers	1,130	66.4	+10.1
Green	Ian Davison*	1,042	61.3	+5.8
Green	Naveen Tangri*	968	56.9	+6.5
Labour	Jill Barker	469	27.6	–10.8
Labour	Jamie Sweeney	407	23.9	–11.2
Labour	Maddy Kerr	400	23.5	–4.9
Conservative	Tom Garth	160	9.4	+0.7
Conservative	Jonathan Bateman	129	7.6	+1.2
Liberal Democrats	Perjit Aujla	104	6.1	+1.5
Conservative	Harry Jee	101	5.9	+0.1
Liberal Democrats	Luke Dickinson	39	2.3	N/A
Liberal Democrats	Josh Lucas Mitte	56	3.3	N/A
Turnout		1,701	25.0	–5.0
Registered electors		6,817		
Rejected ballots		4	0.2	
Green hold				
Green hold				
Green hold				

=== Leamington Clarendon ===
Leamington Clarendon (3 seats)
Party	Candidate	Votes	%	±%
Labour	Katie Hunt	1,480	56.8	+20.2
Labour	Christopher King*	1,427	54.8	+19.8
Labour	Jessica Harrison	1,302	50.0	+17.9
Green	Sarah Richards	569	21.8	+8.9
Liberal Democrats	David Alexander	493	18.9	–12.4
Conservative	Andrew Thompson	482	18.5	–0.1
Liberal Democrats	Blake Hutchings	441	16.9	–12.4
Liberal Democrats	Peter Brown	427	16.4	–11.7
Conservative	Nathan Cox	425	16.3	–2.3
Conservative	Nathan Stone	409	15.7	–2.4
Turnout		2,605	34.4	–1.5
Registered electors		7,579		
Rejected ballots		27	1.0	
Labour hold				
Labour hold				
Labour hold				

=== Leamington Lillington ===
Leamington Lillington (3 seats)
Party	Candidate	Votes	%	±%
Liberal Democrats	Alan Boad*	1,763	55.4	+5.7
Liberal Democrats	Phil Kohler*	1,626	51.1	+8.2
Liberal Democrats	Daniel Russell*	1,382	43.4	–0.7
Labour	Anthony Murphy	727	22.8	+0.2
Labour	Stef Parkins	710	22.3	±0.0
Labour	Ruby Turok	552	17.3	–3.2
Conservative	Philip Rothwell	527	16.6	–1.2
Conservative	David Stevens	467	14.7	–0.9
Green	Marcia Walton	444	14.0	+0.9
Conservative	Lewis Wakeford	339	10.7	–3.5
Green	Angela Smith	311	9.8	–2.2
Green	Tom Walton	235	7.4	–3.2
Heritage	Guy Chapman	116	3.6	N/A
Turnout		3,182	36.0	–1.7
Registered electors		8,832		
Rejected ballots		15	0.5	
Liberal Democrats hold				
Liberal Democrats hold				
Liberal Democrats hold				

=== Leamington Milverton ===
Leamington Milverton (3 seats)
Party	Candidate	Votes	%	±%
Liberal Democrats	Bill Gifford*	1,926	62.4	–0.4
Liberal Democrats	Carolyn Gifford*	1,615	52.3	+1.6
Liberal Democrats	Sidney Syson*	1,424	46.1	–0.6
Labour	Andy Marshall	641	20.8	+2.8
Labour	Helen Adkins	572	18.5	N/A
Labour	Susan Deeley	518	16.8	N/A
Conservative	Lauren Byrne	494	16.0	–9.1
Conservative	Hayley Key	474	15.4	–4.3
Conservative	Cory North	438	14.2	–4.3
Green	Chris Philpott	367	11.9	–2.8
Green	Joel Holmes	285	9.2	–4.6
Turnout		3,087	42.8	–2.7
Registered electors		7,211		
Rejected ballots		14	0.5	
Liberal Democrats hold				
Liberal Democrats hold				
Liberal Democrats hold				

=== Leamington Willes ===
Leamington Willes (3 seats)
Party	Candidate	Votes	%	±%
Green	Martin Luckhurst*	1,611	62.6	+9.4
Green	Will Roberts*	1,609	62.5	+21.0
Green	Ella Billiald	1,444	56.1	+17.2
Labour	Krish Bhardwaj	974	37.8	–1.4
Liberal Democrats	Hugh Foden	253	9.8	+2.6
Conservative	Stacey Calder	230	8.9	–0.2
Liberal Democrats	Ajay Pandey	214	8.3	N/A
Conservative	Tom Chaloner	169	6.6	–0.8
Liberal Democrats	Dan Naylor	161	6.3	N/A
Conservative	Caleb Heather	135	5.2	–2.0
Turnout		2,574	34.6	–1.9
Registered electors		7,444		
Rejected ballots		26	1.0	
Green hold				
Green hold				
Green gain from Labour				

=== Radford Semele ===
Radford Semele (1 seat)
Party	Candidate	Votes	%	±%
Conservative	Becky Noonan	435	40.1	–8.4
Liberal Democrats	Laurence Byrne	398	36.7	+16.2
Labour	Linda Hugl	147	13.6	–0.7
Green	Peggy Wiseman	105	9.7	–7.1
Majority		37	3.7	–24.3
Turnout		1,090	38.4	–1.9
Registered electors		2,842		
Rejected ballots		5	0.5	
Conservative hold		Swing	▼12.3	

=== Warwick All Saints & Woodloes ===
Warwick All Saints & Woodloes (3 seats)
Party	Candidate	Votes	%	±%
Labour	John Sullivan	1,272	46.0	+12.9
Labour	Raj Kang	1,234	44.6	+14.9
Labour	Paul Wightman	1,222	44.1	+15.6
Conservative	Jody Tracey*	989	35.7	–3.2
Conservative	Oliver Jacques*	979	35.4	+1.3
Conservative	Moira-Ann Grainger*	977	35.3	–3.6
Green	Tamsin Lewis	369	13.3	–3.8
Green	Juliet Nickels	349	12.6	–3.5
Liberal Democrats	Monica Boynton	256	9.2	–3.5
Liberal Democrats	Andrew Cooper	183	6.6	N/A
Turnout		2,768	37.9	+0.8
Registered electors		7,302		
Rejected ballots		26	0.9	
Labour gain from Conservative				
Labour gain from Conservative				
Labour gain from Conservative				

=== Warwick Aylesford ===
Warwick Aylesford (2 seats)
Party	Candidate	Votes	%	±%
Labour	Daniel Browne	802	46.1	+15.3
Labour	Gabriel Rosu	710	40.8	+10.1
Conservative	Liam Bartlett*	617	35.5	–4.4
Conservative	Llywelyn Colnet	557	32.0	–7.5
Green	Paul Atkins	200	11.5	–4.2
Liberal Democrats	Fred Dahlmann	171	9.8	–5.5
Liberal Democrats	Jennifer Boileau	144	8.3	–1.3
Green	Tony O'Brien	143	8.2	–5.8
Turnout		1,740	34.6	+1.3
Registered electors		5,034		
Rejected ballots		11	0.6	
Labour gain from Conservative				
Labour gain from Conservative				

=== Warwick Myton & Heathcote ===
Warwick Myton & Heathcote (3 seats)
Party	Candidate	Votes	%	±%
Green	Kathleen Gorman	1,460	50.3	+26.9
Green	Dominic Harrison	1,414	48.7	+25.4
Green	Hema Yellapragada	1,174	40.5	+17.8
Conservative	Gareth Dore	867	29.9	–11.5
Conservative	Cameron Low	841	29.0	–9.8
Conservative	Neale Murphy*	147	5.1	–14.7
Labour	Mini Mangat*	743	25.6	–2.6
Liberal Democrats	John Kelly	177	6.1	–19.0
Liberal Democrats	Michelle McHugh	775	26.7	–17.3
Liberal Democrats	Deborah Pittarello	177	6.1	N/A
Reform	Malcolm Sedgley	73	2.5	N/A
Turnout		2,902	43.8	+0.3
Registered electors		6,630		
Rejected ballots		35	1.2	
Green gain from Conservative				
Green gain from Conservative				
Green gain from Conservative				

=== Warwick Saltisford ===
Warwick Saltisford (2 seats)
Party	Candidate	Votes	%	±%
Labour	Katya Dray	968	50.7	+17.2
Labour	Jim Sinnott	872	45.7	+14.9
Conservative	John Morley	515	27.0	–7.2
Conservative	Hugh Herring	513	26.9	–2.8
Green	Eloise Chilvers	328	17.2	+1.5
Liberal Democrats	Christine Fell	237	12.4	–0.5
Liberal Democrats	Alan Beddow	218	11.4	+1.0
Turnout		1,909	35.4	–1.0
Registered electors		5,391		
Rejected ballots		9	0.5	
Labour gain from Conservative				
Labour hold				

=== Whitnash ===
Whitnash (3 seats)
Party	Candidate	Votes	%	±%
Whitnash Residents	Adrian Barton	1,295	58.9	+2.7
Whitnash Residents	Judith Falp	1,284	58.4	–2.3
Whitnash Residents	Robert Margrave	1,008	45.8	–5.6
Labour	Felix Ling	645	29.3	+2.3
Green	Vicky Clark	316	14.4	+1.5
Green	Wendy Edwards	264	12.0	+3.8
Liberal Democrats	Chris Walsh	215	9.8	+3.7
Green	Bronwen Reid	214	9.7	+1.5
Conservative	Jack Ahern	187	8.5	+0.4
Conservative	Ethan Parmar	161	7.3	+0.9
Conservative	Derek Moore	159	7.2	+1.4
Liberal Democrats	James Jessamine	142	6.5	N/A
UKIP	Laurie Steele	122	5.5	–2.4
Turnout		2,199	29.7	–2.8
Registered electors		7,409		
Rejected ballots		18	0.8	
Whitnash Residents hold				
Whitnash Residents hold				
Whitnash Residents hold				

== Changes 2023–2027 ==
=== By-elections ===
==== Warwick All Saints & Woodloes (January 2024) ====
The by-election was triggered by the resignation of Labour councillor Raj Kang for personal reasons.

Warwick All Saints & Woodloes: 18 January 2024
Party	Candidate	Votes	%	±%
Labour	Claire Wightman	961	52.5	+8.4
Conservative	Jody Tracey	687	37.5	+3.2
Liberal Democrats	Laurence Byrne	183	10.0	+1.1
Majority		274	15.0	N/A
Turnout		1,842	25.5	–12.4
Registered electors		7,232		
Rejected ballots		10	0.5	
Labour hold		Swing	▲2.6	

==== Leamington Clarendon (May 2024) ====
The by-election was triggered by the resignation of Labour councillor Katie Hunt.

Leamington Clarendon: 2 May 2024
Party	Candidate	Votes	%	±%
Labour	Helen Adkins	1,267	51.7	+2.8
Conservative	Moira-Ann Grainger	407	16.6	+0.7
Liberal Democrats	John Kelly	365	14.9	–1.4
Green	Amanda Dyakov-Richmond	362	14.8	–4.0
UKIP	Gerald Smith	50	2.0	N/A
Majority		860	35.2	N/A
Turnout		2,460	32.3	−2.1
Registered electors		7,605		
Rejected ballots		9	0.4	
Labour hold		Swing	▲1.1	

==== Warwick All Saints & Woodloes (February 2025) ====
The by-election was triggered by the departure of councillor John Sullivan.

Warwick All Saints & Woodloes by-election: 13 February 2025
Party	Candidate	Votes	%	±%
Green	Sam Jones	719	34.9	+22.1
Reform	Nigel Clarke	450	21.8	N/A
Labour	Cora-Laine Moynihan	399	19.4	–24.7
Conservative	Jody Tracey	383	18.6	–15.7
Liberal Democrats	Laurence Byrne	110	5.3	–3.6
Majority		269	13.1	N/A
Turnout		2,068	27.8	–10.1
Registered electors		7,445		
Rejected ballots		7	0.3	
Green gain from Labour				

==== Kenilworth Park Hill (September 2025) ====
The by-election was triggered by the resignation of Green councillor Lara Cron.

Kenilworth Park Hill by-election: 18 September 2025
Party	Candidate	Votes	%	±%
Green	Alison Firth	1,007	40.3	–7.2
Conservative	Malcolm Graham	588	23.6	–4.0
Reform	Timothy Wade	447	18.1	N/A
Liberal Democrats	John Dubber	344	13.9	+2.5
Labour	Nicola Jones	81	3.3	–9.5
Majority		419	16.7	N/A
Turnout		2,475	31.5	–10.1
Registered electors		7,863		
Green hold		Swing	▼1.6	

==== Leamington Clarendon (September 2025) ====
The by-election was triggered by the resignation of Labour councillor Helen Adkins, who had also been the council's Housing Portfolio Holder.

Leamington Clarendon by-election: 18 September 2025
Party	Candidate	Votes	%	±%
Labour	Chris Knight	574	30.3	–18.6
Liberal Democrats	Raina Deo	561	29.6	+13.3
Reform	Nigel Clarke	309	16.3	N/A
Green	Abi Underwood	240	12.7	–6.1
Conservative	Dominic Smith	140	7.4	–8.5
Independent	Megan Clarke	72	3.8	N/A
Majority		13	0.7	N/A
Turnout		1,902	25.2	–9.2
Registered electors		7,559		
Labour hold		Swing	▼16.0	
