= Budbrooke =

Village in Warwickshire, England

Coordinates: 52.284°N 1.621°W

- Location within Warwickshire
- Population: 1,863 (2011)
- OS grid reference: SP2665
- District: Warwick
- Shire county: Warwickshire
- Region: West Midlands
- Country: England
- Sovereign state: United Kingdom
- Post town: Warwick
- Postcode district: CV35
- Dialling code: +44(0)1926
- Police: Warwickshire
- Fire: Warwickshire
- Ambulance: West Midlands
- UK Parliament: Kenilworth and Southam

Budbrooke is a village and civil parish in the Warwick district of Warwickshire, England. It is 3 miles west of Warwick and according to the 2001 census the parish had a population of 2,319, reducing to 1,863 at the 2011 Census. Most of the population of Budbrooke live in Hampton Magna, a housing estate built in the late 1960s, with other smaller settlements in Budbrooke Village and Hampton on the Hill.

== History ==
=== Middle Ages ===
The original parish dates from 1086 (Domesday Book) when Ralph de Limesi held Budebroc for William the Conqueror. It consisted of five hides of land, a mill, farms and woods. It was one mile long and three furlongs wide. The parish church of St. Michael dates from the twelfth century. In 1350, the village suffered from the Black Death and became a ghost town. Most of the village, including the vicarage and the Manor house, crumbled. The track which now passes under the railway arch known as Kyte's Bridge was the most likely route for the corpses being taken from the village to Dead Field on Hatton Hill. Of the original village, only the church remains, and even that became a ruin in the mid-17th century, not to be restored until the Victorian era.

=== Early Modern period ===
When the old village declined, the centre of the parish moved to Grove Park, the home of the Dormer family who were granted the manor in 1608. During the English Civil War, a force of five thousand Royalist horse and foot soldiers paused at Grove Park to rest. The Parliamentarian supporter, Lord Brook in Warwick, was aware of their arrival and, with seven thousand men, met the Royalists. After some "negotiations" the Royalist forces marched away, joining Charles I and his army at Coventry.

The village of Hampton-on-the-Hill, on the edge of Grove Park, became the main development area of the parish. A significant community developed there, with a shop that later became a police house, a forge, a post office, a club room and a public house. The Roman Catholic church of St Charles Borromeo was built by Lord Dormer and given to the parish in 1819. In the 1790s, the Birmingham and Warwick Canal was constructed, which is now part of the Birmingham "main line" of the Grand Union Canal. This passes through Budbrooke parish, and the Hatton flight of 21 canal locks that lift the canal up out of the Avon valley are just outside the village.

=== Budbrooke barracks ===
Budbrooke Barracks was established on a site about half a mile to the east of Budbrooke church. A restored St. Michael's church became the battalion church. The military connections of the area are retained in some of the road names in the village of Hampton Magna, created in the late 1960s, with the Royal Warwickshire Regiment itself being commemorated in a road called simply, "The Warwicks". Caen Close and Normandy Close recall the part played by the regiment in the liberation of France during the Second World War. Arras Boulevard commemorates the Battle of Arras during the First World War. Montgomery Avenue is named after Bernard Montgomery. The barracks site was remembered in the celebrations of the 60th anniversary of VE and VJ Day, which were held in the parish on 10 September 2005. The Royal Warwickshire Regiment was the senior Regiment in what was, in the 1950s, the "Midland Brigade: viz with the Leicestershire Regiment, the Sherwood Foresters,(the Nottinghamshire and Derbyshire regiment, the Lincolnshire Regiment. It had a huge Drill Square and was the unit where Brigade OR1's, (National Servicemen of potential officer status), were trained before taking the exams of the Unit Selection Board prior to the War Office Selection Board.

=== Creation of Hampton Magna ===
In the late 1960s and early 1970s the barracks site was re-developed into the "20th Century Village" of Hampton Magna. As a result of the community spirit in the new village, a Community Centre was built in Field Barn Road on land leased to the Parish Council by the local District Council. Budbrooke Primary School was built in 1968, replacing the old school in Hampton-on-the Hill. In 2019, Warwick District Council released land adjacent to Hampton Magna from the green belt to allow extra housing to be built onto the existing village.

== Budbrooke today ==
The parish is dominated by the Hampton Magna housing estate, with Hampton-on-the-Hill being the second largest settlement. The village of Budbrooke is extremely small and consists of only a few buildings. In addition, there are a small handful of farms within the parish. In Hampton-on-the-Hill, most of the former public buildings have been converted to private dwellings. However, there is a modern village hall (on the site of a previous hall provided by the Dormer family) and is regularly used. The parish has one school (Budbrooke Primary School), which is located in the centre of Hampton Magna. There are two churches in the parish; these are St. Michael's, a 12th Century Anglican parish church located in Budbrooke village and St. Charles Borromeo Catholic Church in Hampton-on-the-Hill. The Budbrooke Community Centre which was extended in 1985 hosts a number of local community activities including 1st Hampton Magna Scouts Group. Other facilities in Hampton Magna include a surgery, the Cawston House suite of retirement properties, and two parks (on Styles Close and Montgomery Avenue) and a farm shop located in Groves park on the border of Hampton-on-the-Hill and Hampton Magna housing estate Groves Park called the Veg Box.

The original six shops in Hampton Magna included a newsagent, a hardware store, a VG shop, a greengrocer, a hairdresser and a butcher's shop. Today, three units remain: a combined Post Office, newsagent and mini mart; a beauty salon; and The Open Door, a Christian cafe, meeting centre and fair trade products shop sponsored by St. Michael's Church. Housing has been built on the site of the other three units.

Hampton Magna Athletic F.C was established in the 1969/70 season, they are now known as just Hampton Magna F.C. Their current home ground is Aylesford School. Their club crest is the same as Budbrooke Primary School's, the famous Antelope which is the Royal Warwickshire Regiment insignia. They are still going and in the 2019/20 season they celebrated their 50th anniversary. Their kit colours are black and gold (home) and red (away). They currently play in Tracey Thomas Leamington Spa and District Sunday Football League 2. In 2019 they won The Division 2 Cup at Racing Club Warwick. In 2017 they won Division 3 winning in the last game of the season to gain promotion. Central Ajax F.C. of the Midland Football League play within the parish boundaries.

=== Earthquake ===
At 5.30am on 23 September 2000 Budbrooke was the epicentre of one of the largest earthquakes ever recorded in the 21st century in the United Kingdom. The earthquake measured 4.2 on the Richter Scale and caused little damage.

== Transport ==
Budbrooke is close to the A46 which runs to the east of the parish. This leads to Coventry in the northbound direction, and to junction 15 of the M40 in the southbound direction. Access to nearby Warwick is provided by both the A425 and A4189. Warwick Parkway railway station is located within Budbrooke parish, which is operated by Chiltern Railways. Located about half a mile north-east of Hampton Magna, it provides direct rail services to both London Marylebone and Birmingham Moor Street, via the Chiltern Main Line. The station primarily serves as a park and ride facility for the wider area, but is also used by local residents. The nearest passenger airport is Birmingham Airport which is 17 miles away. The smaller cargo only Coventry Airport is also 10 miles away. The IndieGo demand responsive transport bus system operated by Stagecoach on behalf of Warwickshire County Council provides on-demand bus services across the Warwick district including Budbrooke, replacing the former 68 bus route.
