= Central Hospital, Hatton =

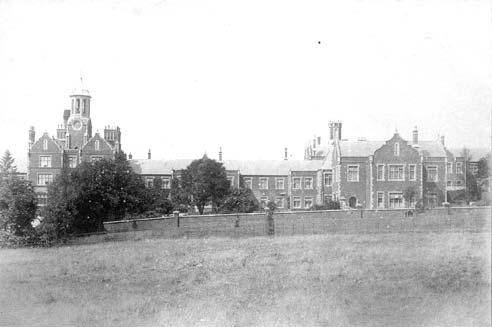
- Central Hospital in the 1890s

- Shown in Warwickshire

Geography
- Location: Hatton, England, United Kingdom
- Coordinates: 52.3014°N 1.6344°W

Organisation
- Care system: Public NHS
- Type: Public

Services
- Emergency department: No Accident & Emergency

History
- Founded: 1852
- Closed: 1995

Links
- Lists: Hospitals in England

Central Hospital was a psychiatric hospital located in Hatton, Warwickshire, England.

== History ==
Building began in 1846 on a 42-acre (17 ha) site purchased from the Earl of Warwick and was completed in 1852, the first patients moving in on 30 June. It was originally named the Warwick County Lunatic Asylum and from 1930-1948 the Warwickshire County Mental Hospital. A classic Victorian asylum built on a grand scale in the gothic style, it at one point housed 1,600 patients.

Eventually gaining over 377 acres (153 ha) of land, the hospital patients provided most of their own food from three farms in the grounds and a spring supplied it with water. Many of the staff lived there too, it was more like a village than a hospital. It even had its own sports pitches, coffin maker and a chapel which was completed in 1862. The vicar of Hatton was responsible for the religious life of the hospital. Nevertheless, it was, in the early days, a reasonably hard place to be treated by modern standards. Mentally ill patients were subjected to, amongst other things, electric shock therapy. However compared to contemporary poor house asylums and established public asylums like Bedlam, Central treated their patients quite kindly with parties and drama productions regularly held for, and by, patients.

In the 1920s construction began on the King Edward VII Memorial Sanatorium on land adjoining the site. This later became the Hertford Hill Hospital and was used for the treatment of Tuberculosis.

In 1933 the first voluntary admissions were allowed and outpatient clinics were opened in the neighbouring urban areas of Warwick, Leamington and Coventry. In 1948 the hospital joined the National Health Service freeing up the patients to the outside world as never before. In the 1950s and 1960s the hospital evolved further. With the increasing population and understanding of mental illnesses the hospital was overcrowded for over 20 years between 1945 and the late 1960s. A step in the right direction during that time however was the building of Nuffield House in partnership with the Nuffield Foundation. These were rehabilitation units which were in essence a halfway house between the wards of the main hospital and a typical suburban home and were supervised but not totally controlled by staff. Between 1978 and 1994 Central Ajax F.C., currently of the Midland Football League, played home matches on the site.

After services were transferred to St Michael's Hospital, the hospital itself was officially closed on 31 July 1995. Many of the buildings were razed to the ground and a housing estate, Hatton Park, was built there. However some of the old buildings are listed and remained, albeit as houses.

== Gallery ==
Hatton Park - 2008

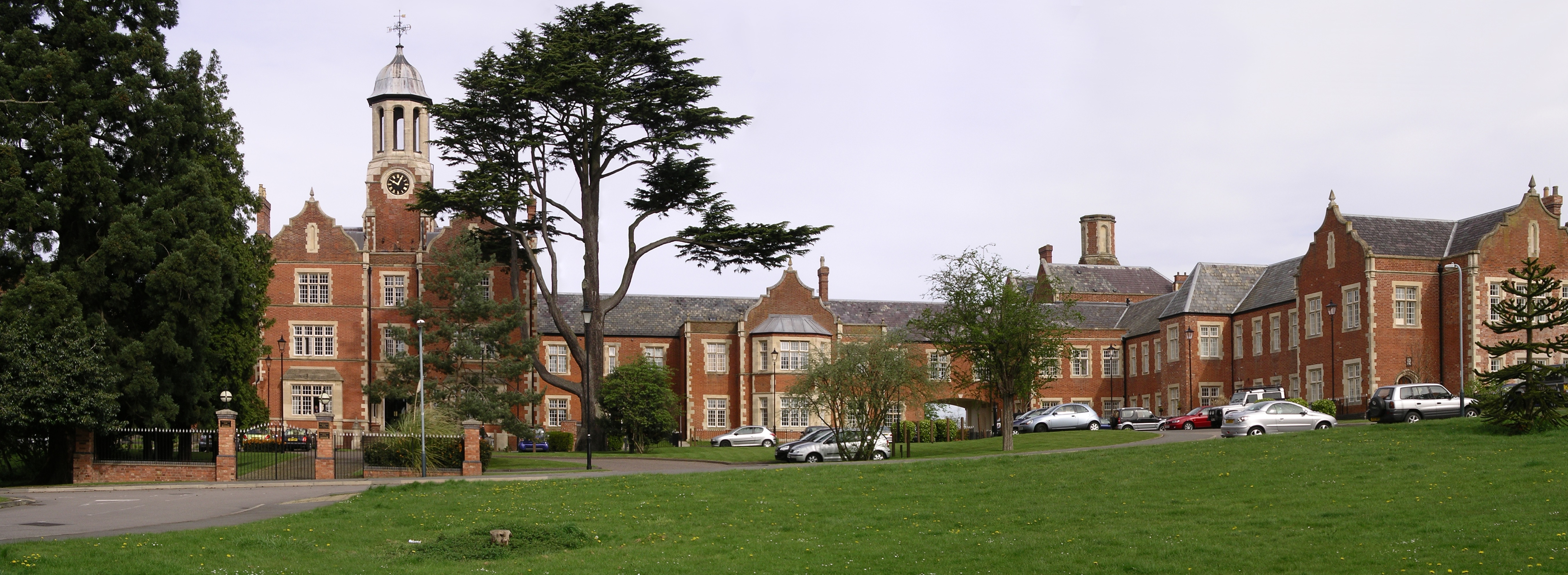
Tredington Park frontage

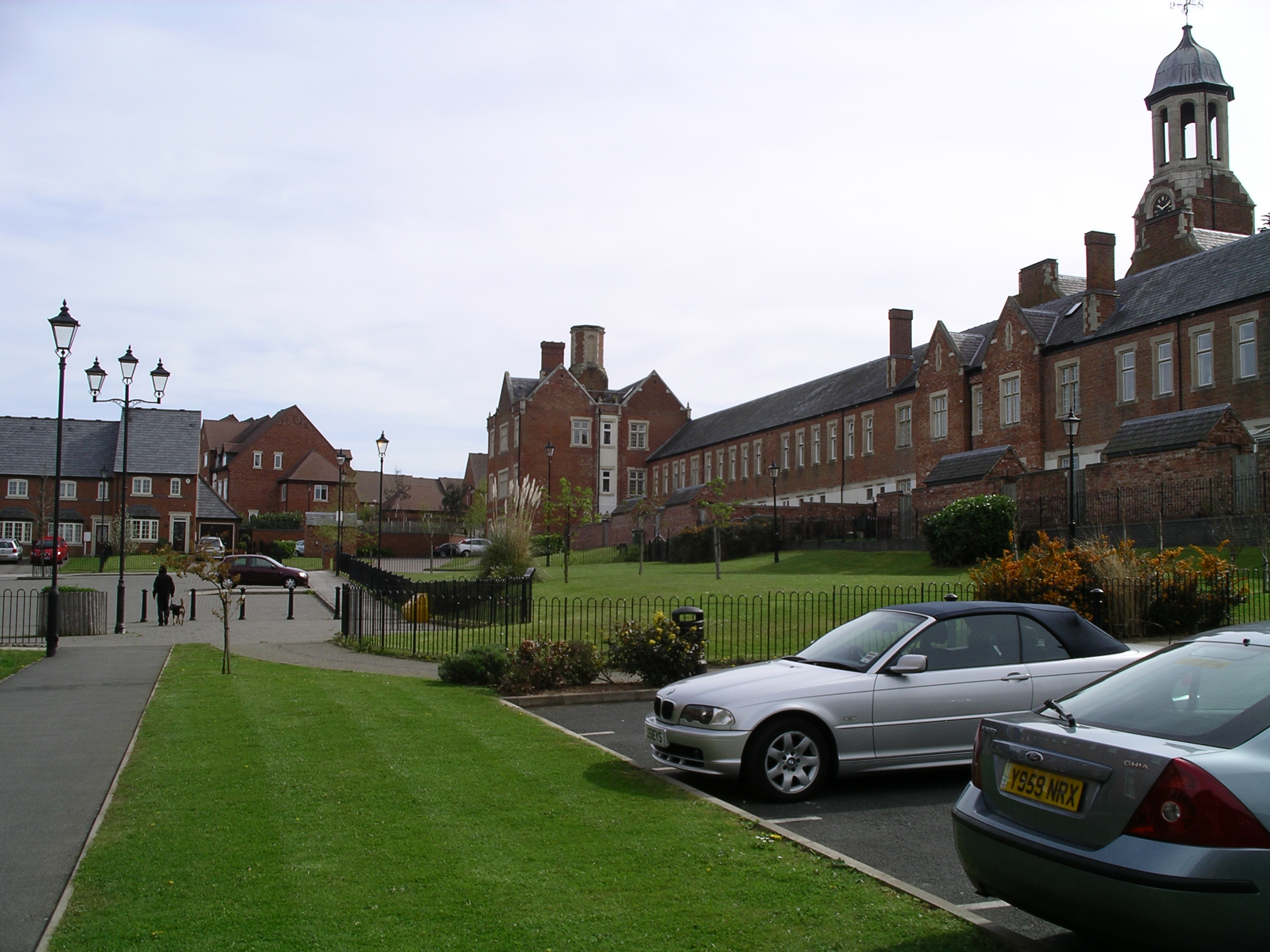
The rear of Tredington Park (formally Central Hospital) showing part of the new housing estate

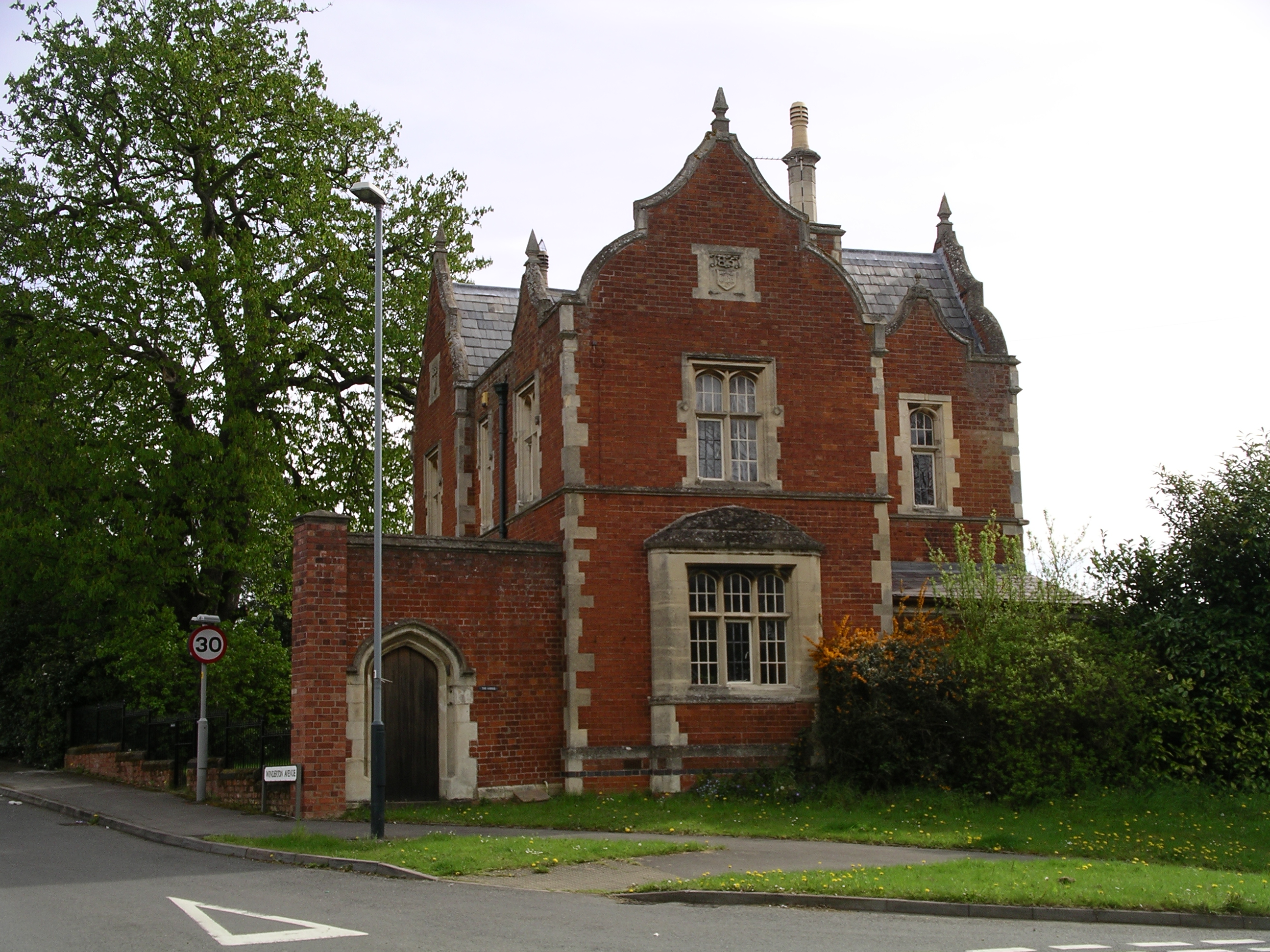
The former lodge of Central Hospital

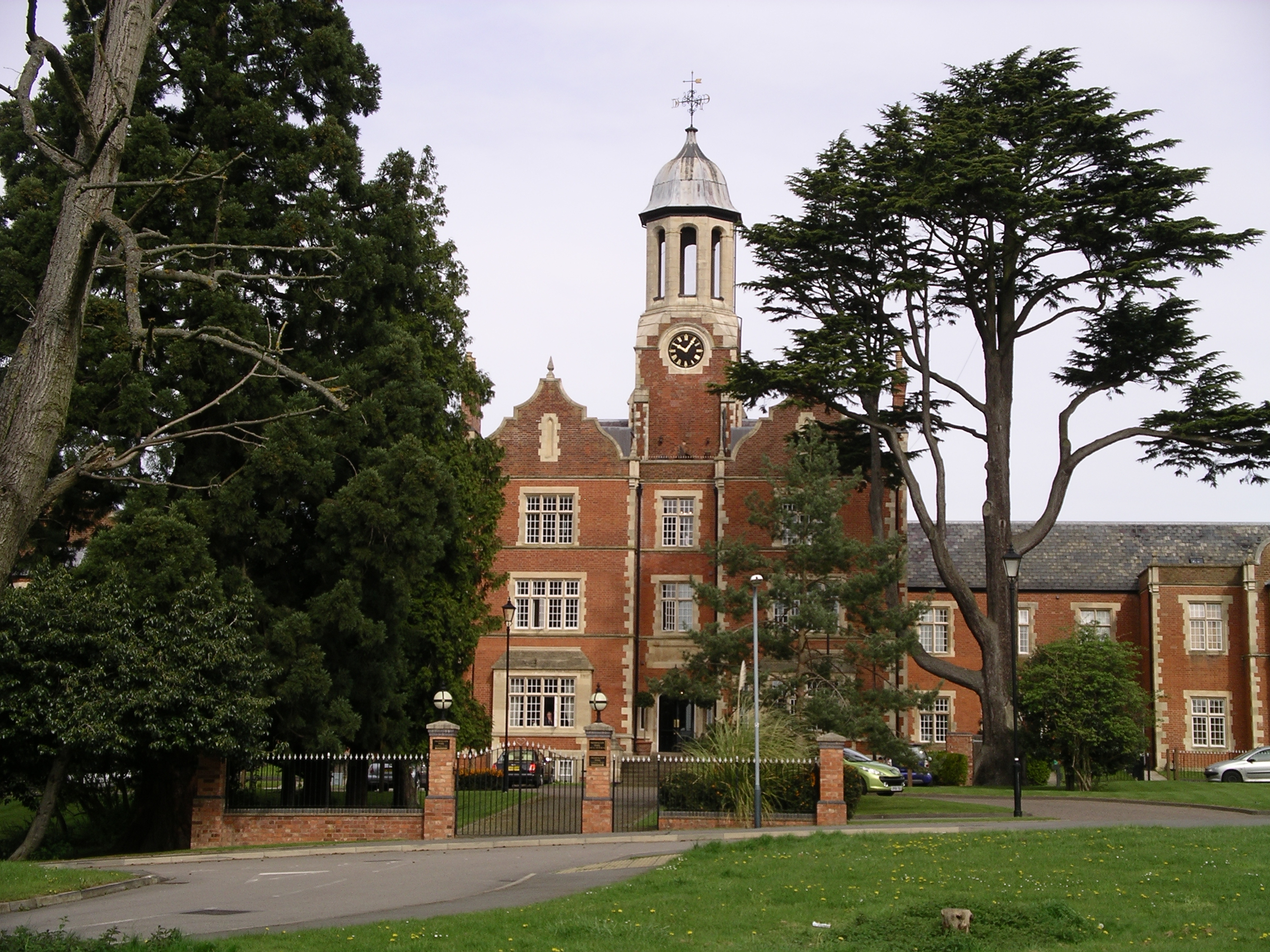
The Bell Tower

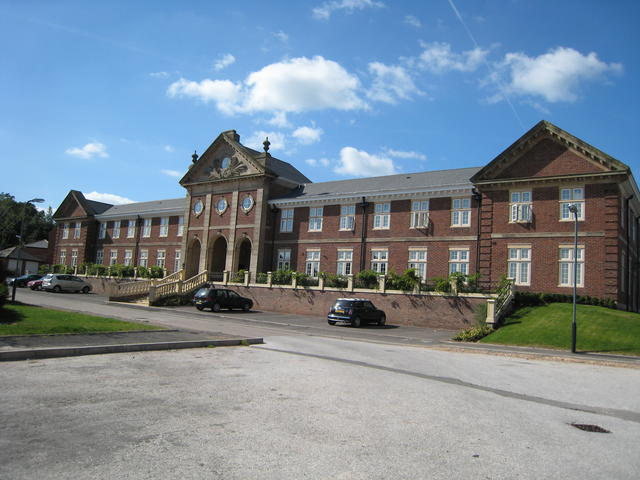
Former Hertford Hill Hospital
