= List of United Kingdom locations: Str-Stt =

The United Kingdom

This is part of the list of United Kingdom locations: a gazetteer of place names in the United Kingdom showing each place's locality and geographical coordinates.

== Str ==
Location	Locality	Coordinates (links to map & photo sources)	OS grid reference
Straad	Argyll and Bute	55.81°N 05.12°W	NS0462
Strachan	Aberdeenshire	57.01°N 02.54°W	NO6792
Strachur	Argyll and Bute	56.16°N 05.07°W	NN0901
Stradbroke	Suffolk	52.31°N 01.27°E	TM2374
Stradishall	Suffolk	52.13°N 00.54°E	TL7452
Stradsett	Norfolk	52.61°N 00.45°E	TF6605
Stragglethorpe	Lincolnshire	53.05°N 00.64°W	SK9152
Straight Soley	Wiltshire	51.44°N 01.54°W	SU3272
Straiton	Midlothian	55.88°N 03.16°W	NT2766
Straiton	South Ayrshire	55.30°N 04.55°W	NS3804
Straloch	Perth and Kinross	56.74°N 03.57°W	NO0463
Stramshall	Staffordshire	52.91°N 01.89°W	SK0735
Strand	Gloucestershire	51.81°N 02.42°W	SO7113
Strand	City of Westminster	51.50°N 00.12°W	TQ3080
Strandburgh Ness	Shetland Islands	60.61°N 00.77°W	HU669928
Strands	Cumbria	54.24°N 03.26°W	SD1884
Strang	Isle of Man	54.17°N 04.51°W	SC3678
Strangeways	Manchester	53.48°N 02.24°W	SJ8499
Strangford	Herefordshire	51.94°N 02.61°W	SO5828
Strangways	Wiltshire	51.18°N 01.80°W	SU1443
Stranog	Aberdeenshire	57.05°N 02.23°W	NO8696
Stranraer	Dumfries and Galloway	54.89°N 05.04°W	NX0560
Strata Florida	Ceredigion	52.26°N 03.84°W	SN7465
Stratfield Mortimer	Berkshire	51.37°N 01.05°W	SU6664
Stratfield Saye	Hampshire	51.34°N 01.02°W	SU6861
Stratfield Turgis	Hampshire	51.32°N 01.01°W	SU6959
Stratford	Bedfordshire	52.10°N 00.27°W	TL1847
Stratford	Gloucestershire	52.04°N 02.17°W	SO8838
Stratford	Newham	51.53°N 00.01°W	TQ3884
Stratford Marsh	Tower Hamlets	51.52°N 00.02°W	TQ3783
Stratford New Town	Newham	51.53°N 00.01°W	TQ3884
Stratford St Andrew	Suffolk	52.19°N 1.45°E	TM3560
Stratford St Mary	Suffolk	51.96°N 00.96°E	TM0434
Stratford-sub-Castle	Wiltshire	51.08°N 01.81°W	SU1332
Stratford Tony	Wiltshire	51.03°N 01.87°W	SU0926
Stratford-upon-Avon	Warwickshire	52.19°N 01.72°W	SP1955
Strath	Highland	57.72°N 05.71°W	NG7977
Strathan or East Strathan (Melness)	Highland	58.54°N 04.45°W	NC5764
Strathan (Loch Inver)	Highland	58.13°N 05.26°W	NC0821
Strathan (Attadale)	Highland	57.38°N 05.44°W	NG9338
Strathan Skerray	Highland	58.53°N 04.33°W	NC6463
Strathaven	South Lanarkshire	55.67°N 04.06°W	NS7044
Strathblane	Stirling	55.98°N 04.30°W	NS5679
Strathbungo	City of Glasgow	55.83°N 04.28°W	NS5762
Strathcarron	Highland	57.42°N 05.43°W	NG9442
Strathcoil	Argyll and Bute	56.40°N 05.76°W	NM6830
Strathcoul	Highland	58.47°N 03.52°W	ND1155
Strathdon	Aberdeenshire	57.19°N 03.07°W	NJ3512
Strathkinness	Fife	56.33°N 02.87°W	NO4616
Strathmiglo	Fife	56.27°N 03.27°W	NO2110
Strathpeffer	Highland	57.58°N 04.54°W	NH4858
Strathtay	Perth and Kinross	56.65°N 03.79°W	NN9053
Strathwhillan	North Ayrshire	55.56°N 05.14°W	NS0235
Strathy	Highland	58.55°N 04.01°W	NC8365
Strathy Point	Highland	58.60°N 04.02°W	NC825698
Strathyre	Stirling	56.32°N 04.33°W	NN5617
Stratton	Cornwall	50.82°N 04.52°W	SS2206
Stratton	Dorset	50.73°N 02.49°W	SY6593
Stratton	Gloucestershire	51.72°N 01.98°W	SP0103
Stratton Audley	Oxfordshire	51.92°N 01.12°W	SP6026
Stratton Chase	Buckinghamshire	51.63°N 00.58°W	SU9894
Stratton-on-the-Fosse	Somerset	51.24°N 02.50°W	ST6550
Stratton St Margaret	Swindon	51.58°N 01.75°W	SU1787
Stratton St Michael	Norfolk	52.49°N 01.23°E	TM2093
Stratton Strawless	Norfolk	52.73°N 01.28°E	TG2220
Stravithie	Fife	56.28°N 02.76°W	NO5311
Strawberry Bank	Cumbria	54.29°N 02.90°W	SD4189
Strawberry Hill	East Sussex	51.11°N 00.22°E	TQ5637
Strawberry Hill	Richmond Upon Thames	51.43°N 00.34°W	TQ1572
Strawberry Hill	Wakefield	53.68°N 01.36°W	SE4221
Streat	East Sussex	50.91°N 00.08°W	TQ3515
Streatham	Lambeth	51.42°N 00.13°W	TQ3071
Streatham Hill	Lambeth	51.44°N 00.13°W	TQ3073
Streatham Park	Wandsworth	51.42°N 00.14°W	TQ2971
Streatham Vale	Merton	51.41°N 00.14°W	TQ2970
Streatley	Bedfordshire	51.94°N 00.44°W	TL0728
Streatley	Berkshire	51.51°N 01.15°W	SU5980
Street	Cumbria	54.46°N 02.58°W	NY6208
Street	Devon	50.69°N 03.16°W	SY1889
Street	Lancashire	53.96°N 02.73°W	SD5252
Street	North Yorkshire	54.42°N 00.87°W	NZ7304
Street (Mendip)	Somerset	51.12°N 02.74°W	ST4836
Street (Winsham, South Somerset)	Somerset	50.85°N 02.92°W	ST3507
Street Ash	Somerset	50.91°N 03.02°W	ST2813
Street Ashton	Warwickshire	52.43°N 01.33°W	SP4582
Street Dinas	Shropshire	52.93°N 02.99°W	SJ3338
Street End	Hampshire	50.96°N 01.21°W	SU5519
Street End	Kent	51.23°N 01.06°E	TR1453
Street End	West Sussex	50.78°N 00.79°W	SZ8599
Street Gate	Gateshead	54.92°N 01.67°W	NZ2159
Streethay	Staffordshire	52.68°N 01.79°W	SK1410
Streethouse	Wakefield	53.67°N 01.41°W	SE3920
Street Houses	North Yorkshire	53.89°N 01.21°W	SE5245
Streetlam	North Yorkshire	54.37°N 01.52°W	SE3198
Street Lane	Derbyshire	53.02°N 01.43°W	SK3848
Streetly	Birmingham	52.58°N 01.86°W	SP0998
Street Lydan	Wrexham	52.94°N 02.84°W	SJ4339
Streetly End	Cambridgeshire	52.10°N 00.34°E	TL6148
Street on the Fosse	Somerset	51.14°N 02.55°W	ST6139
Strefford	Shropshire	52.46°N 02.82°W	SO4485
Strelley	Nottinghamshire	52.96°N 01.25°W	SK5041
Strensall	York	54.03°N 01.03°W	SE6360
Strensham	Worcestershire	52.05°N 02.13°W	SO9140
Stretch Down	Devon	50.90°N 03.69°W	SS8113
Stretcholt	Somerset	51.18°N 03.01°W	ST2943
Strete	Devon	50.31°N 03.64°W	SX8347
Strete Ralegh	Devon	50.74°N 03.36°W	SY0495
Stretford (Leominster)	Herefordshire	52.20°N 02.70°W	SO5257
Stretford (Monkland and Stretford)	Herefordshire	52.19°N 02.82°W	SO4455
Stretford	Trafford	53.44°N 02.31°W	SJ7994
Strethall	Essex	52.02°N 00.15°E	TL4839
Stretham	Cambridgeshire	52.34°N 00.21°E	TL5174
Strettington	West Sussex	50.85°N 00.73°W	SU8907
Stretton (Cheshire West and Chester)	Cheshire	53.06°N 02.83°W	SJ4452
Stretton (Warrington)	Cheshire	53.33°N 02.58°W	SJ6182
Stretton	Derbyshire	53.14°N 01.41°W	SK3961
Stretton	Rutland	52.72°N 00.60°W	SK9415
Stretton (South Staffordshire)	Staffordshire	52.69°N 02.17°W	SJ8811
Stretton (East Staffordshire)	Staffordshire	52.83°N 01.63°W	SK2526
Stretton en le Field	Leicestershire	52.69°N 01.55°W	SK3011
Stretton Grandison	Herefordshire	52.09°N 02.54°W	SO6344
Stretton-on-Dunsmore	Warwickshire	52.34°N 01.41°W	SP4072
Stretton-on-Fosse	Warwickshire	52.04°N 01.68°W	SP2238
Stretton Sugwas	Herefordshire	52.07°N 02.78°W	SO4642
Stretton under Fosse	Warwickshire	52.42°N 01.33°W	SP4581
Stretton Westwood	Shropshire	52.57°N 02.60°W	SO5998
Strichen	Aberdeenshire	57.58°N 02.10°W	NJ9455
Strines	Stockport	53.37°N 02.04°W	SJ9786
Stringston	Somerset	51.17°N 03.18°W	ST1742
Strixton	Northamptonshire	52.24°N 00.68°W	SP9061
Stroat	Gloucestershire	51.67°N 02.62°W	ST5797
Strode	Bath and North East Somerset	51.34°N 02.67°W	ST5361
Stromay	Western Isles	57.65°N 07.13°W	NF937744
Stromeferry	Highland	57.34°N 05.55°W	NG8634
Stromemore	Highland	57.35°N 05.55°W	NG8635
Strom Ness	Orkney Islands	59.35°N 02.42°W	HY760519
Stromness	Orkney Islands	58.96°N 03.30°W	HY2509
Stronaba	Highland	56.91°N 04.95°W	NN2084
Stronachlachar	Stirling	56.25°N 04.58°W	NN4010
Stronchreggan	Highland	56.80°N 05.16°W	NN0772
Strond	Western Isles	57.74°N 06.99°W	NG0384
Strone (Cowal)	Argyll and Bute	55.97°N 04.90°W	NS1980
Strone (Newtonmore)	Highland	57.07°N 04.12°W	NH7100
Strone (Inverness)	Highland	57.31°N 04.45°W	NH5228
Strone (Inverclyde)	Inverclyde	55.92°N 04.73°W	NS2974
Strongarbh	Argyll and Bute	56.62°N 06.07°W	NM5055
Stronmilchan	Argyll and Bute	56.40°N 05.00°W	NN1528
Stronord	Dumfries and Galloway	54.94°N 04.42°W	NX4564
Stronsay	Orkney Islands	59.10°N 02.58°W	HY664243
Strontian	Highland	56.68°N 05.57°W	NM8161
Strood (Rolvenden, Ashford)	Kent	51.05°N 00.63°E	TQ8532
Strood (Medway)	Kent	51.39°N 00.47°E	TQ7269
Strood Green	Surrey	51.21°N 00.28°W	TQ2048
Strood Green (Kirdford)	West Sussex	51.00°N 00.54°W	TQ0224
Strood Green (Slinfold)	West Sussex	51.07°N 00.38°W	TQ1332
Strothers Dale	Northumberland	54.90°N 02.04°W	NY9757
Stroud	Gloucestershire	51.74°N 02.23°W	SO8405
Stroud	Hampshire	51.00°N 00.97°W	SU7223
Stroud	Surrey	51.10°N 00.68°W	SU9235
Stroude	Surrey	51.40°N 00.56°W	TQ0068
Strouden	Bournemouth	50.74°N 01.84°W	SZ1194
Stroud Green	Essex	51.57°N 00.66°E	TQ8590
Stroud Green	Gloucestershire	51.76°N 02.29°W	SO8007
Stroud Green	Haringey	51.57°N 00.11°W	TQ3188
Stroul	Argyll and Bute	56.00°N 04.82°W	NS2483
Stroxton	Lincolnshire	52.86°N 00.66°W	SK9031
Stroxworthy	Devon	50.94°N 04.36°W	SS3419
St Ruan	Cornwall	49.99°N 05.19°W	SW7115
Struan	Highland	57.35°N 06.42°W	NG3438
Struan	Perth and Kinross	56.76°N 03.96°W	NN8065
Struanmore	Highland	57.34°N 06.42°W	NG3437
Strubby	Lincolnshire	53.31°N 00.17°E	TF4582
Structon's Heath	Worcestershire	52.28°N 02.33°W	SO7765
Strugg's Hill	Lincolnshire	52.91°N 00.08°W	TF2937
Strumble Head	Pembrokeshire	52.02°N 05.07°W	SM894404
Strumore	Western Isles	57.60°N 07.19°W	NF9069
Strumpshaw	Norfolk	52.61°N 01.46°E	TG3507
Strutherhill	South Lanarkshire	55.71°N 03.97°W	NS7649
Struy	Highland	57.42°N 04.68°W	NH3940
Stryd	Isle of Anglesey	53.30°N 04.64°W	SH2482
Stryd y Facsen	Isle of Anglesey	53.31°N 04.50°W	SH3383
Stryt-issa	Wrexham	52.99°N 03.07°W	SJ2845

== St S ==
Location	Locality	Coordinates (links to map & photo sources)	OS grid reference
St Serf's Island	Perth and Kinross	56.18°N 03.36°W	NO157003
St Stephen	Hertfordshire	51.72°N 00.35°W	TL1403
St Stephen-in-Brannel	Cornwall	50.34°N 04.89°W	SW9453
St Stephens (Launceston)	Cornwall	50.64°N 04.37°W	SX3285
St Stephens (Saltash)	Cornwall	50.40°N 04.23°W	SX4158
St Stephens	Hertfordshire	51.74°N 00.36°W	TL1306

== St T ==
Location	Locality	Coordinates (links to map & photo sources)	OS grid reference
St Teath	Cornwall	50.58°N 04.74°W	SX0680
St Thomas	Devon	50.70°N 03.55°W	SX9091
St Thomas	Swansea	51.62°N 03.93°W	SS6693
St Tudy	Cornwall	50.55°N 04.74°W	SX0676
St Twynnells	Pembrokeshire	51.63°N 04.97°W	SR9497
