= List of shipwrecks in May 1877 =

The list of shipwrecks in May 1877 includes ships sunk, foundered, grounded, or otherwise lost during May 1877.

== 1 May ==
List of shipwrecks: 1 May 1877
| Ship | State | Description |
|---|---|---|
| Maranham | United Kingdom | The ship was sighted in distress whilst on a voyage from Mauritius to a Channel port. Presumed subsequently foundered with the loss of all hands. |
| Milano | United Kingdom | The schooner ran aground at Dragør, Denmark. She was on a voyage from Königsberg, Germany to Bergen, Norway. |

== 2 May ==
List of shipwrecks: 2 May 1877
| Ship | State | Description |
|---|---|---|
| Janet and Maria | United Kingdom | The ship foundered in the North Sea off the Newarp Lightship ( Trinity House). Her crew were rescued. She was on a voyage from Hartlepool, County Durham to Sandwich, Kent. |
| Ogmore | United Kingdom | The steamship ran aground off Breaksea Point, Glamorgan. She was later refloated. |
| R. P. Buck | United States | The barque was wrecked 5 nautical miles (9.3 km) east of the mouth of the Ratel River, Cape Colony. Her crew were rescued. She was on a voyage from Java, Netherlands East Indies to Falmouth, Cornwall, United Kingdom. |
| Silvery Wave | United Kingdom | The brig ran aground near Breaksea Point. |
| St. Aubyn | United Kingdom | The steamship ran aground in the Dardanelles. She was refloated with the assistance of tugs and put in to Constantinople, Ottoman Empire. |

== 3 May ==
List of shipwrecks: 3 May 1877
| Ship | State | Description |
|---|---|---|
| Berkeley Castle | United Kingdom | The ship was driven ashore at South Shields, County Durham. She was on a voyage from the River Tyne to Quebec City, Canada. |
| Hendrika | Netherlands | The ship ran aground on the St. Estep |
| Nouvelle Maria | France | The ship was driven ashore and sank at Queenstown, County Cork, United Kingdom. |
| Ogmore | United Kingdom | The steamship was driven ashore at Breaksea Point, Glamorgan. |

== 4 May ==
List of shipwrecks: 4 May 1877
| Ship | State | Description |
|---|---|---|
| Elizabeth Mary | United Kingdom | The ship was run into by the steamship Pelican (United Kingdom) and was deiven ashore at Penarth, Glamorgan. |
| Koh-i-Noor | United Kingdom | The schooner was driven ashore at Balbriggan, County Dublin. She was on a voyage from Troon, Ayrshire to Balbriggan. |
| Rivera | Spain | The steamship ran aground on the Dorneiru Rock. She was on a voyage from Liverpool, Lancashire, United Kingdom to Vigo. |
| Scotia | United Kingdom | The barque was driven ashore at the Sletterhage Lighthouse, Denmark. |
| St. Pierre | France | The ship sprang a leak and sank in the River Spey. |

== 6 May ==
List of shipwrecks: 6 May 1877
| Ship | State | Description |
|---|---|---|
| Dan Glaister | United Kingdom | The ship was wrecked in Holm Bay. Her crew were rescued. |
| Two unnamed vessels | Russia | Russo-Turkish War: The lighters were shelled and sunk in the Danube at Rahowa, Ottoman Empire. |

== 7 May ==
List of shipwrecks: 7 May 1877
| Ship | State | Description |
|---|---|---|
| Dragon | United Kingdom | The barque ran aground in the Hooghly River downstream of Diamond Harbour, India. She was on a voyage from Galle, Ceylon to Calcutta, India. She was refloated and completed her voyage. |
| Two unnamed vessels | Greece | Russo-Turkish War: The ships were shelled and burnt in the Danube at Vidin, Ottoman Empire. They were each on a voyage from Rahova, United Principalities to Sulina, Ottoman Empire. A third vessel was captured. |

== 8 May ==
List of shipwrecks: 8 May 1877
| Ship | State | Description |
|---|---|---|
| John Williams | United Kingdom | The ship was holed by a pile and sank at Portsmouth, Hampshire. |
| Teutonia | United Kingdom | The ship ran aground at New Orleans, Louisiana, United States. She was on a voyage from New Orleans to Liverpool, Lancashire. |
| Xantho | United Kingdom | The ship was driven ashore and severely damaged at Bebek, Ottoman Empire. She was refloated and taken in to Bebek. |

== 9 May ==
List of shipwrecks: 9 May 1877
| Ship | State | Description |
|---|---|---|
| Albion | United Kingdom | The steamship ran aground in the River Tweed. She was on a voyage from Berwick upon Tweed, Northumberland to London. She was refloated and resumed her voyage. |
| Alida | United States | 1877 Iquique earthquake: The full-rigged ship was wrecked in an earthquake at Pabellón de Pica, Chile. |
| Arctic | United Kingdom | 1877 Iquique earthquake: The ship was damaged in an earthquake at Pabellón de Pica or Huanillos. She was repaired. |
| Atlantic | Norway | 1877 Iquique earthquake: The barque was damaged in an earthquake at Huanillos, Peru. |
| Austriana | United Kingdom | 1877 Iquique earthquake: The full-rigged ship was driven ashore and severely damaged in an earthquake at Callao. She was later refloated. |
| Avonmore | United Kingdom | 1877 Iquique earthquake: The ship was run into by Geneva (United States), was driven ashore, refloated and sank in an earthquake at Huanillos with the loss of eight lives. |
| Callao | United Kingdom | 1877 Iquique earthquake: The ship was damaged in an earthquake. |
| Caprera | United Kingdom | 1877 Iquique earthquake: The barque was wrecked in an earthquake at Iquique, Peru. |
| Caroline | France | 1877 Iquique earthquake: The ship was damaged in an earthquake at Iquique. |
| Carollton | United States | 1877 Iquique earthquake: The full-rigged ship was driven ashore and severely damaged in an earthquake at Pabellón de Pica. She was later refloated. |
| C. F. Sergeant | United States | 1877 Iquique earthquake: The full-rigged ship was driven ashore and damaged in an earthquake at Huanillos. She was later refloated. |
| Chanaral | France | 1877 Iquique earthquake: The ship was damabed in an earthquake at Iquique. |
| Charles Luling | Germany | 1877 Iquique earthquake: The ship was damaged in an earthquake at Punta de Lobos, Chile. |
| Cleveland | Norway | 1877 Iquique earthquake: The full-rigged ship was damaged in an earthquake at Huanillos. |
| Condor | United Kingdom | The yacht was driven ashore at Douglas, Isle of Man. Her crew were rescued. |
| Conference | United Kingdom | 1877 Iquique earthquake: The full-rigged ship was driven ashore and crushed by a rockfall in an earthquake at Huanillos. Her crew were rescued. |
| Conqueror | United Kingdom | 1877 Iquique earthquake: The barque was severely damaged in an earthquake at Huanillos, or at Callao. |
| Conway Castle | United Kingdom | 1877 Iquique earthquake: The full-rigged ship was driven ashore, refloated and sank in an earthquake at Huanillos. Her crew were rescued. |
| Coquimbo | France | 1877 Iquique earthquake: The ship was damaged in an earthquake at Pabellón de Pica. |
| Cosmopolis | Canada Canada | 1877 Iquique earthquake: The ship was damaged in an earthquake at Callao. |
| Courrier de Lima | France | 1877 Iquique earthquake: The ship was severely damaged in an earthquake at Callao, or at Pabellón de Pica. She was consequently condemned. |
| Dakota | United Kingdom | The steamship was wrecked on the East Mouse, near Amlwch, Anglesey. All 530 people on board were rescued by the by rocket apparatus, the Amlwch Lifeboat and other vessels. She was on a voyage from Liverpool, Lancashire to New York, United States. She broke in two the next day and became a total wreck. |
| Drot No. 1 | Norway | 1877 Iquique earthquake: The barque sank in an earthquake at Callao. |
| Drot No. 2 | Norway | 1877 Iquique earthquake: The barque was driven ashore in an earthquake at Callao. |
| Duke of Rothesay | United Kingdom | 1877 Iquique earthquake: The full-rigged ship was damaged in an earthquake at Huanillos. |
| Edinburgh Gift | United Kingdom | 1877 Iquique earthquake: The ship was severely damaged in an earthquake. |
| E. F. Gubion | Germany | 1877 Iquique earthquake: The full-rigged ship was wrecked in an earthquake at Pabellón de Pica. |
| Eliza Campbell | United Kingdom | 1877 Iquique earthquake: The barque was severely damaged in an earthquake at Huanillos. |
| Eliza and Mathilde | Norway | 1877 Iquique earthquake: The barque was severely damaged in an earthquake at Huanillos. |
| Estre Madura | United Kingdom | The schooner was driven ashore at Kirkcaldy, Fife. She was on a voyage from Runcorn, Cheshire to Kirkcaldy. |
| Felicia | United Kingdom | 1877 Iquique earthquake: The full-rigged ship was severely damaged in an earthquake at Pabellón de Pica. She was consequently condemned. |
| Gabriel Castro | Peru | 1877 Iquique earthquake: The hulk sank in an earthquake at Huanillos with the loss of all on board. |
| Gallino Sousequor | Italy | 1877 Iquique earthquake: The full-rigged ship was severely damaged in an earthquake at Huanillos. |
| Gauthoid | Norway | 1877 Iquique earthquake: The barque was damaged in an earthquake at Huanillos. |
| Geneva | United States | 1877 Iquique earthquake: The ship was driven into Avonmore (United Kingdom), driven ashore, refloated and sank in an earthquake at Huanillos with the loss of nine lives. |
| Giuseppe | Italy | 1877 Iquique earthquake: The full-rigged ship was damaged in an earthquake at Huanillos. |
| Gladiator | United Kingdom | 1877 Iquique earthquake: The ship was damaged in an earthquake. She was consequently condemned. |
| Gontoid | Norway | 1877 Iquique earthquake: The barque was damaged in an earthquake at Huanillos. |
| Governor Tilley | United Kingdom | 1877 Iquique earthquake: The full-rigged ship was severely damaged in an earthquake at Huanillos. She was repaired. |
| Havre | France | 1877 Iquique earthquake: The ship was wrecked at Punta de Lobos. |
| Herschel | Germany | 1877 Iquique earthquake: The full-rigged ship was severely damaged in an earthquake at Huanillos. |
| Hiram | Norway | 1877 Iquique earthquake: The barque was severely damaged in an earthquake at Callao. |
| Jeremiah Thompson | United States | 1877 Iquique earthquake: The full-rigged ship was severely damaged in an earthquake at Huanillos. |
| Jessie Morris and Moira | United Kingdom | 1877 Iquique earthquake: The ship was damaged in an earthquake at Punta de Lobos. |
| John Bryce | United States | 1877 Iquique earthquake: The full-rigged ship was driven ashore and damaged in an earthquake at Pabellón de Pica. She was later refloated. |
| John Lawrence | Flag unknown | 1877 Iquique earthquake: The ship was damaged in an earthquake. |
| Kenilworth | United Kingdom | 1877 Iquique earthquake: The ship was damaged in an earthquake at Callao when she collided with Gladan (United Kingdom) and J. Bryce (United States). |
| King Cedric | United Kingdom | 1877 Iquique earthquake: The ship was damaged in an earthquake at Huanillos. She was repaired. |
| Lady Bellau | United Kingdom | 1877 Iquique earthquake: The barque was wrecked in an earthquake at Pabellón de Pica. |
| Lancashire Witch | United Kingdom | 1877 Iquique earthquake: The ship was damaged in an earthquake at Callao. |
| Launarshaugh | Germany | 1877 Iquique earthquake: The barque was damaged in an earthquake at Huanillos. |
| Mallzerda | United Kingdom | 1877 Iquique earthquake: The full-rigged ship was damaged in an earthquake at Pabellón de Pica. |
| Matilde | Norway | 1877 Iquique earthquake: The barque was damaged in an earthquake at Huanillos. |
| Melville | United Kingdom | 1877 Iquique earthquake: The ship was damaged in an earthquake at Huanillos. |
| Mexico | France | The ship was wrecked at Soulac-sur-Mer, Gironde. She was on a voyage from Havre de Grâce, Seine-Inférieure to Bordeaux, Gironde. |
| Nichels | United Kingdom | 1877 Iquique earthquake: The ship was damaged in an earthquake at Huanillos. |
| Niranand | Norway | 1877 Iquique earthquake: The full-rigged ship was damaged in an earthquake at Pabellón de Pica. |
| Norham Castle | United Kingdom | 1877 Iquique earthquake: The barque was severely damaged in an earthquake at Callao. |
| Pietro | Italy | 1877 Iquique earthquake: The barque was wrecked in an earthquake at Pabellón de Pica. |
| Pietro B. | Italy | 1877 Iquique earthquake: The ship was wrecked in an earthquake at Callao. |
| Prince Eugene | Canada | 1877 Iquique earthquake: The ship was damaged in an earthquake at Callao. |
| Prince Leopold | United Kingdom | 1877 Iquique earthquake: The barque was severely damaged in an earthquake at Callao. |
| Prince Umberto | United Kingdom | 1877 Iquique earthquake: The full-rigged ship was severely damaged in an earthquake at Pabellón de Pica, or at Callao. |
| Resolute | United States | 1877 Iquique earthquake: The full-rigged ship was damaged in an earthquake at Huanillos. |
| Sabrina | United Kingdom | 1877 Iquique earthquake: The ship was run into by another vessel in an earthquake at Iquique and was damaged. |
| Samuel | United Kingdom | 1877 Iquique earthquake: The barque was severely damaged in an earthquake at Huanillos. |
| Shamrock | United Kingdom | 1877 Iquique earthquake: The ship was wrecked in an earthquake at Punta de Lobos. |
| Silvia B. | Italy | 1877 Iquique earthquake: The barque was wrecked in an earthquake at Pabellón de Pica. |
| Sir John Lawrence | United Kingdom | 1877 Iquique earthquake: The full-rigged ship was damaged in an earthquake at Huanillos. |
| St. Joseph | United States | 1877 Iquique earthquake: The full-rigged ship was damaged in an earthquake at Pabellón de Pica. |
| Theobald | United States | 1877 Iquique earthquake: The full-rigged ship was damaged in an earthquake at Huanillos. |
| Uggland | Norway | 1877 Iquique earthquake: The barque was damaged in an earthquake at Huanillos. |
| Westfield | Canada | 1877 Iquique earthquake: The ship was damaged in an earthquake at Callao. |
| William Leavitt | Canada | 1877 Iquique earthquake: The full-rigged ship was severely damaged in an earthquake at Huanillos, or at Callao. |
| Zoermis Voss | Germany | 1877 Iquique earthquake: The barque sank in an earthquake at Iquique. |

== 10 May ==
List of shipwrecks: 10 May 1877
| Ship | State | Description |
|---|---|---|
| Charger | United Kingdom | The ship was driven ashore near Quebec City, Canada. She was on a voyage from Belfast, County Antrim to Quebec City. |
| Pacific | United States | 1877 Iquique earthquake: The whaler ran aground at Maui, Hawaii due to the approach of a tsunami. |
| Rothesay | Norway | The ship was driven ashore at New York, United States. She was on a voyage from Rochester to Helsingør, Denmark. She was refloated and put back to New York. |
| Tamor | Austria-Hungary | The brig was driven ashore at Almería, Spain. She was on a voyage from Alexandria, Egypt to Rochester, Kent, United Kingdom. |

== 11 May ==
List of shipwrecks: 11 May 1877
| Ship | State | Description |
|---|---|---|
| Frithiof | Norway | The brig was holed by ice and sank off "Westergard", Öland, Sweden. Her crew were rescued. |
| Lütf-ü Celil | Ottoman Navy | Illustration of Lütf-ü Celil exploding in the distance. Russo-Turkish War: The ironclad warship exploded and sank in the Danube off Izmail after being hit by Russian artillery, suffering about 160 men killed. The river monitor Feth-ül İslam (Ottoman Navy) rescued twenty survivors. |
| Morris | United Kingdom | The schooner was driven ashore at Sandery Point, County Antrim. She was on a voyage from Red Bay, County Antrim to Barrow-in-Furness, Lancashire. |
| Unnamed | United Kingdom | The pilot boat capsized off Tynemouth, Northumberland with the loss of one of the two people on board. |

== 12 May ==
List of shipwrecks: 12 May 1877
| Ship | State | Description |
|---|---|---|
| R. Bartlett | United States | The barque foundered in the Grand Banks of Newfoundland with the loss of all but four of her crew. Survivors took to a boat; they were rescued on 18 May by the barque Catherine (United States). |

== 13 May ==
List of shipwrecks: 13 May 1877
| Ship | State | Description |
|---|---|---|
| Comorin | United Kingdom | The steamship was driven ashore at Chardonnière, Île d'Oléron, Vendée, France. She was on a voyage from Cardiff, Glamorgan to Bordeaux, Gironde, France. |
| Helen | United Kingdom | The schooner was driven ashore and wrecked at Street, Devon. Her crew were rescued. |
| Venus | Netherlands | The steamship ran aground at Málaga, Spain. She was on a voyage from Palermo, Sicily, Italy to Rotterdam, South Holland. She was refloated with assistance from the steamship Cádiz (Spain). |
| William Gifford | Flag unknown | The 232-ton barque, which had sprung a leak on 11 May, was run ashore in Toetoes Bay and was wrecked. Her crew survived. She was on a voyage from Oamaru to Port Chalmers. |

== 14 May ==
List of shipwrecks: 14 May 1877
| Ship | State | Description |
|---|---|---|
| Ardmore | United Kingdom | The steamship was driven ashore at Riva, Ottoman Empire. She was on a voyage from Nicholaieff, Russia to a British port. She was refloated on 16 May and towed in to Constantinople, Ottoman Empire. |
| Concordia | Germany | The barque was run into by the steamship Martin (United Kingdom) and sank in the River Thames at Plaistow, Essex. |
| East Goodwin Lightship, and Wohldorf | Trinity House; Germany | The barque Wohldorf collided with the East Goodwin Lightship. Both vessels were severely damaged. Wohldorf was on a voyage from Kiel to Southampton, Hampshire, United Kingdom. She was towed in to Ramsgate, Kent, United Kingdom by the tug Rescue (United Kingdom). |
| Giovanni | Italy | The barque caught fire and sank off Beşiktaş, Ottoman Empire. She was on a voyage from Antwerp, Belgium to Constantinople, Ottoman Empire. |
| Hulda | Sweden | The ship collided with 'Emilie (Sweden) and sank. Her crew were rescued. Hulda was on a voyage from Newcastle upon Tyne, Northumberland, United Kingdom to Nyköping. |
| Meindina | Germany | The schooner was driven ashore and wrecked on Terschelling, Friesland, Netherlands. Her crew were rescued. |
| Mountaineer | United Kingdom | The brig was driven ashore and damaged at Sandhammaren, Sweden. Her crew were rescued. She was on a voyage from Leith, Lothian to Stockholm, Sweden. She was later refloated and towed in to Ystad, Sweden in a leaky condition. |
| Peter Anna | Germany | The ship was driven ashore and wrecked at Sandhammaren. Her crew were rescued. She was on a voyage from Königsberg to Korsør, Denmark. |
| Tynedale | United Kingdom | The steamship was driven ashore at Bayonne, Basses-Pyrénées, France. She was on a voyage from Troon, Ayrshire to Bayonne. |

== 15 May ==
List of shipwrecks: 15 May 1877
| Ship | State | Description |
|---|---|---|
| Atlantico | Portugal | The steamship was driven into Vasco da Gama (Portuguese Navy) and sank at Lisbon. Her crew were rescued. |
| Danae | United Kingdom | The steamship ran aground at Ockachiv, Russia. She was refloated with assistance from a Russian steamship and resumed her voyage. |
| Nautilus | United Kingdom | The brig was wrecked on Navassa Island in a hurricane. Her crew survived. |
| Sally and Hannah | United Kingdom | The fishing lugger ran aground and sank off Grainthorpe, Lincolnshire. Her crew survived. She was refloated with assistance from the smacks Morning Star and Ruth (both United Kingdom) and taken in to Grimsby, Lincolnshire. |
| Unnamed | Flag unknown | The ship ran aground on the Cannon Rock, off the coast of County Down, United Kingdom. |

== 16 May ==
List of shipwrecks: 16 May 1877
| Ship | State | Description |
|---|---|---|
| Baron Hambro | United Kingdom | The ship was driven ashore at Gasgardia, Öland, Sweden. She was on a voyage from Riga, Russia to Rouen, Seine-Inférieure, France. She was refloated with assistance and taken in to Copenhagen, Denmark. |
| Feronia | Flag unknown | The 329-ton barque stranded and became a wreck near the entrance to Kaipara Harbour, New Zealand. |
| Marietta Tilton | United States | The schooner collided with the steamship Harrisburg (United States) and sank off the Cross Rip Lightship (United States) with much loss of life. Four survivors were rescued by Harrisburg. |
| Unnamed | France | The fishing smack was run down and sunk off Penmarc'h, Finistère by the steamship Rothesay (United Kingdom) with the loss of six of her nine crew. Survivors were rescued by another smack. Also reported as run down by the steamship Faulconnier (France). |

== 17 May ==
List of shipwrecks: 17 May 1877
| Ship | State | Description |
|---|---|---|
| Good Hope | United Kingdom | The steamship ran aground on the Moniscar Reef, in the Mediterranean Sea off Malta. She was refloated on 21 May and taken in to Valetta, Malta. |
| Julia Anne | United Kingdom | The ship was driven ashore at Colombo, Ceylon. Her crew were rescued. She subsequently broke up. |
| Morehampton | United Kingdom | The ship was driven ashore at "Cettinge". She was on a voyage from Königsberg, Germany to Rotterdam, South Holland, Netherlands. |
| Ottawa | United Kingdom | The steamship ran aground in the Hellegat. She was on a voyage from the Black Sea to Rotterdam, South Holland, Netherlands. |
| Yokohama | United Kingdom | The ship was driven ashore at Colombo. Her crew were rescued. She subsequently broke up. |

== 18 May ==
List of shipwrecks: 18 May 1877
| Ship | State | Description |
|---|---|---|
| Adonis | United Kingdom | The ship was wrecked on the coast of Saint Domingo. Her crew were rescued. She was on a voyage from Saint Domingo to Liverpool, Lancashire. |
| Baramoncita | Norway | The brig was driven ashore on Hiiumaa, Russia. She was on a voyage from Stavanger to Narva, Russia. She was refloated and taken in to Baltic Port, Russia in a leaky condition. |
| Iris | Sweden | The steamship was driven ashore at Hammeren, Denmark. She was on a voyage from Stockholm to Hamburg, Germany. She was refloated with assistance and resumed her voyage. |
| Mary Cory | United Kingdom | The brigantine ran aground at Plymouth, Devon. She was refloated on 22 May and taken in to the Cattewater. |
| Sjælland | Denmark | The steamship was driven ashore at "Stapelbodden". She was on a voyage from Havre de Grâce, Seine-Inférieure, France to Riga and Reval, Russia. |
| Tam o'Shanter | United Kingdom | The ship was driven ashore at Grainthorpe, Lincolnshire. She was on a voyage from South Shields, County Durham to Calais, France. |
| Thomas Young | United Kingdom | The ship was driven ashore and wrecked on Stronsay, Orkney Islands. Her crew were rescued. She was on a voyage from Liverpool to Lerwick, Shetland Islands. |

== 19 May ==
List of shipwrecks: 19 May 1877
| Ship | State | Description |
|---|---|---|
| Aros Bay | United Kingdom | The ship was driven ashore at Dungeness, Kent. She was on a voyage from Glasgow, Renfrewshire to Rangoon, Burma. She was refloated with the assistance of the tugs Macgregor, Renown and Victor (all United Kingdom) and taken in to The Downs. |
| Emilia | Italy | The barque ran aground at Civita Vecchia. She was on a voyage from Civita Vecchia to a British port. |
| Emma | Germany | The brig ran aground. She was on a voyage from Stettin to Rouen, Seine-Inférieure, France. She was refloated and taken in to Copenhagen, Denmark in a leaky condition. |
| Mandal | Norway | The barque was driven ashore at "Margen". She was on a voyage from Liverpool, Lancashire, United Kingdom to Narva, Russia. She was refloated and taken in to Reval, Russia in a leaky condition |
| Severn | United Kingdom | The steamship was driven ashore at Cartagena, Spain. |

== 20 May ==
List of shipwrecks: 20 May 1877
| Ship | State | Description |
|---|---|---|
| Fauchon | United Kingdom | The ship ran aground on the Grasar Shoal. She was on a voyage from Hull, Yorkshire to Oskarshamn, Sweden. She was refloated on 31 May with the assistance of a steamship. |

== 21 May ==
List of shipwrecks: 21 May 1877
| Ship | State | Description |
|---|---|---|
| Morecambe Queen | United Kingdom | The steamship ran aground off Morecambe, Lancashire. Her passengers were taken off. |

== 22 May ==
List of shipwrecks: 22 May 1877
| Ship | State | Description |
|---|---|---|
| Ascupart | United Kingdom | The steamship ran aground at Saltholmen, Denmark. She was on a voyage from Newcastle upon Tyne, Northumberland to Kronstadt, Russia. She was refloated with assistance from a steamship and put in to Copenhagen, Denmark. |
| Glenroy | United Kingdom | The barque ran aground on a reef off the coast of Brazil. She was on a voyage from Hartlepool, County Durham to Maranhão, Brazil. She was refloated and taken in to Maranhão in a severely leaky condition and was beached there. |
| Haabet | Norway | The ship was taken in to Portsoy, Aberdeenshire, United Kingdom in a derelict and waterlogged condition. |
| Hastings | United Kingdom | The ship was damaged by ice and sank in the Baltic Sea. Her crew were rescued by Star of Hope (United Kingdom). |
| Upton | United Kingdom | The steamship ran aground at Hela, Germany. |
| Venus | United Kingdom | The ship caught fire at Ardglass, County Down and was scuttled. |

== 23 May ==
List of shipwrecks: 23 May 1877
| Ship | State | Description |
|---|---|---|
| Concezzione | Italy | The barque ran aground on the Kish Bank, in the Irish Sea. She was on a voyage from Glasgow, historic, United Kingdom to Genoa. |

== 24 May ==
List of shipwrecks: 24 May 1877
| Ship | State | Description |
|---|---|---|
| Duke of Newcastle | United Kingdom | The ship was driven ashore and wrecked at "Torre Nuevo". She was on a voyage from Valencia, Spain to Livorno, Italy. |

== 25 May ==
List of shipwrecks: 25 May 1877
| Ship | State | Description |
|---|---|---|
| Dauntless | United Kingdom | The smack ran aground on the Haaks Bank, in the North Sea off the coast of the Netherlands and was wrecked. Her crew were rescued. She was later refloated and returned to Great Yarmouth, Norfolk, where she arrived on 5 June. |
| Lindesnæs | Norway | The steamship was destroyed by fire off Porkkalanniemi, Grand Duchy of Finland. Her crew were rescued. She was on a voyage from Christiania to Helsinki, Grand Duchy of Finland. |
| Lorn | Norway | The barque was driven ashore in the Øresund. She was on a voyage from Wilmington, Delaware, United States to Stettin, Germany. |
| Pelago | United Kingdom | The steamship was driven ashore near Livorno, Italy. She was on a voyage from Genoa to Naples and Sicily, Italy. |
| Silbury | United Kingdom | The steamship ran aground at West Cowes, Isle of Wight. She was on a voyage from Huelva, Spain to Newcastle upon Tyne, Northumberland. She was refloated and resumed her voyage. |

== 26 May ==
List of shipwrecks: 26 May 1877
| Ship | State | Description |
|---|---|---|
| James Mason | United Kingdom | The ship ran aground at Villareal, Spain. She was on a voyage from Porto, Portugal to Villareal. She was refloated. |
| Seyfi | Ottoman Navy | Russo-Turkish War: The Hizbir-class monitor was sunk with a spar torpedo by the torpedo boat Rândunica (Royal Romanian Navy), in the Danube near Măcin. The first instance in history when a torpedo craft sank its target without also sinking. |

== 27 May ==
List of shipwrecks: 27 May 1877
| Ship | State | Description |
|---|---|---|
| Caroline and Elizabeth | United Kingdom | The Humber Keel collided with another Humber Keel and sank in the Humber near Hull, Yorkshire. Her crew survived. |
| Charlotte | United Kingdom | The schooner was driven ashore at Bideford, Devon. Her crew were rescued by a pilot boat. |
| Essen | Germany | The steamship sank off the Swedish coast. |
| Golconda | United Kingdom | The ship was sighted in the Indian Ocean whilst on a voyage from Bassein, India to Shanghai, China. No further trace, reported missing. |
| Joannis Scaltzounis | Greece | The brig was wrecked on the Hook Sands, in the Bristol Channel off Clevedon, Somerset, United Kingdom. All on board were rescued by a tug. She was on a voyage from Constanţa, Ottoman Empire to Gloucester, United Kingdom. |
| Miriam | United Kingdom | The barque was driven ashore and wrecked between Saltburn-by-the-Sea and Skinningburn, Yorkshire with the loss of a crew member. She was on a voyage from Riga, Russia to Hartlepool, County Durham. |
| Rambler | United Kingdom | The fishing lugger ran aground at Lowestoft, Suffolk with the loss of a crew member. |
| Seraphina | United Kingdom | The smack was driven ashore and wrecked at Bideford. Her crew were rescued by a pilot boat. |
| Silvery Wave | United Kingdom | The brig ran aground on the Pennington Spit, off the coast of Hampshire. She was on a voyage from Southampton, Hampshire to Cardiff, Glamorgan. |

== 28 May ==
List of shipwrecks: 28 May 1877
| Ship | State | Description |
|---|---|---|
| Calypso | Greece | The steamship ran aground on the Urgento Shoal. She was on a voyage from Corfu to Gallipoli, Ottoman Empire. |
| Cambria | United Kingdom | The steamship ran aground in the River Thames at Tilburyness, Essex. She was on a voyage from Dundee, Forfarshire to London. She was refloated and resumed her voyage. |
| Ceres | Sweden | The brig foundered in the North Sea. Her crew were rescued. She was on a voyage from Middlesbrough, Yorkshire, United Kingdom to Söderhamn. |
| Gloria | Spain | The steamship ran around and was wrecked off Pulau Laut, Spanish East Indies (04°35′15″N 107°58′45″E). All on board were rescued, but her passengers were refused passage to Singapore, Straits Settlements on board the barque Marquis of Argyle (United Kingdom) as they were political prisoners. |
| John Harley | United Kingdom | The brig was driven ashore and wrecked at Nash Point, Glamorgan. She was on a voyage from Cork to Newport, Monmouthshire. |
| Junak | Austria-Hungary | The barque was driven ashore and wrecked at Castletown, Isle of Man. Her fifteen crew were rescued by the Castletown Lifeboat Commercial Traveller ( Royal National Lifeboat Institution) and by rocket apparatus. Junak was on a voyage from Alexandria, Egypt to Glasgow, Renfrewshire, United Kingdom. She was refloated with assistance from the tender Trader (United Kingdom) on 31 May. |
| Lavinia | United Kingdom | The ship was driven ashore and wrecked at Castletown with the loss of all hands. |
| Lorena | United Kingdom | The brigantine was driven ashore and wrecked at Scarlett Point, Isle of Man with the loss of all hands. |
| Pembrokeshire Lass | United Kingdom | The brigantine ran aground on Ted's Bank, in the Irish Sea off the coast of Lancashire. Her crew were rescued by the Southport Lifeboat Eliza Fearnley ( Royal National Lifeboat Institution), but her captain refused to leave the vessel. Pembrokeshire Lass was on a voyage from Cork to Liverpool, Lancashire. |
| Sultana | United Kingdom | The ship ran aground on The Manacles, Cornwall. She was refloated and taken in to Falmouth, Cornwall in a leaky condition. |
| Tri Fratelli | Italy | The barque ran aground on the Black Middens, in the North Sea off the coast of County Durham, United Kingdom. She was on a voyage from Antwerp, Belgium to South Shields, County Durham. She was refloated with assistance from the tug Stephensons (United Kingdom) and taken in to South Shields. |

== 29 May ==
List of shipwrecks: 29 May 1877
| Ship | State | Description |
|---|---|---|
| Gloria | Spain | The steamship was wrecked at "Pulo Sant". She was on a voyage from Manila, Spanish East Indies to Barcelona. |
| Island Queen | United Kingdom | The brigantine ran aground on the Splough Rock, off Greenore Point, County Louth and sank. Her crew survived. She was on a voyage from Cardiff, Glamorgan to Cork. |
| Martha Lavana | Norway | The ship was wrecked on the Shipwash Sand, in the North Sea off the coast of Suffolk, United Kingdom. Her crew got aboard the Shipwash Lightship ( Trinity House), from where they were rescued by the smack Albatross (United Kingdom). Martha Lavana was on a voyage from Bergen to San Sebastián and Gijón, Spain. |
| Tartar | United Kingdom | The ship was driven ashore at Shanghai, China. She was refloated with the assistance of a tug. |

== 30 May ==
List of shipwrecks: 30 May 1877
| Ship | State | Description |
|---|---|---|
| Gloria | Flag unknown | The steamship ran aground of Pulo Lant, in the Natuna Sea and was wrecked. All on board survived. |

== 31 May ==
List of shipwrecks: 31 May 1877
| Ship | State | Description |
|---|---|---|
| Eliza McLaughin | Canada | The ship ran aground near Antwerp, Belgium. She was on a voyage from King's Lynn, Norfolk, United Kingdom to Baltimore, Maryland, United States. She was refloated on 9 June and towed in to Antwerp. |
| Maria et Bertha | France | The lugger collided with the steamship Acklington (United Kingdom) and sank at Redon, Ille-et-Vilaine. Her crew were rescued. Maria et Bertha was on a voyage from Miquelon to Redon. |
| Punjaub | United Kingdom | The ship departed from Kobe, Japan for Falmouth, Cornwall. No further trace, presumed foundered with the loss of all 22 crew. |

== Unknown date ==
List of shipwrecks: Unknown date in May 1877
| Ship | State | Description |
|---|---|---|
| Adriatic | United Kingdom | The ship was damaged by ice and was beached on Anticosti Island, Nova Scotia, Canada. She was on a voyage from Leith, Lothian to Quebec City, Canada. |
| Amicitia | Netherlands | The brig capsized at sea. She was towed in to Copenhagen, Denmark on 28 May. |
| Annie Jones | United Kingdom | The ship was abandoned in the Atlantic Ocean. |
| Azow | Norway | The barque was run into by the steamship Nurnberg (Germany) and sank off the coast of Maryland, United States with the loss of four of her crew. Survivors were rescued by Nurnberg. Azow was on a voyage from Baltimore, Maryland to Queenstown, County Cork, United Kingdom. The wreck was dispersed by explosives on 6 July. |
| Carolina | United Kingdom | The ship was driven ashore near Sandby, Öland, Sweden. She was on a voyage from Newcastle upon Tyne, Northumberland to Gunnebo, Sweden. |
| City of Quebec | Canada | The ship ran aground in the Saint Lawrence River and was damaged. She was refloated and taken in to Quebec City. |
| City of San Francisco | United States | The steamship struck a rock and foundered. All on board were rescued. She was on a voyage from Panama City, United States of Colombia to San Francisco, California. |
| Clara Chapman | United States | The vessel was lost at Sandy Point. Her crew were rescued. |
| Clarissa | United Kingdom | The ship was driven ashore near Ventava, Courland Governorate. She was refloated with assistance. |
| Contest | Canada | The tug was driven ashore at Bic, Quebec. |
| Crosby | United Kingdom | The steamship was driven ashore at Ochakiv, Russia. She was on a voyage from Nicholaieff, Russia to an English port. She was refloated on 3 May with assistance from the steamship Asire (Russia) and resumed her voyage. |
| Cruzeiro | France | The barque was driven ashore at Pará, Brazil. She was on a voyage from Nantes, Loire-Inférieure to Pará. |
| Dumsires | United Kingdom | The ship was driven ashore at "St. Valier", Canada. She was on a voyage from Quebec City, Canada to Liverpool, Lancashire. She was refloated and put back to Quebec City in a leaky condition. |
| Ella Vose | United Kingdom | The barque collided with the barque Pohono ( Canada) and foundered in the Atlantic Ocean off the coast of the Newfoundland Colony with the loss of ten of her sixteen crew. Survivors were rescued by Pohono. Ella Vose was on a voyage from Baltimore to Queenstown. |
| Emily Smith | Western Australia | The ship was wrecked on Kangaroo Island, South Australia with the loss of 30 lives. |
| Enigheden | Flag unknown | The ship foundered at sea. Her crew were rescued. She was on a voyage from Ivittuut, Iceland to Philadelphia, Pennsylvania, United States. |
| Euclid | United Kingdom | The steamship ran aground on the Fahludd Reef, in the Baltic Sea. . |
| Fanny David | Belgium | The steamship collided with an Ottoman Navy man-of-war at Çeşme, Ottoman Empire. She was on a voyage from Odesa, Russia to Antwerp. She was severely damaged and was beached. |
| Gambia | United Kingdom | The steamship was wrecked at Madeira. |
| Geertruida | Netherlands | The schooner was holed by ice and sank near Riga, Russia. Her crew were rescued. She was on a voyage from the Firth of Forth to Riga. |
| Hadda | South Australia | The barque was wrecked in Champion Bay. Her crew were rescued. |
| Hendrika | Netherlands | The steamship ran aground on the St. Estephe Bank, in the Gironde. She was refloated on 3 May and resumed her voyage. |
| Jenny | United Kingdom | The Mersey Flat collided with another vessel and sank in the River Mersey off Egremont, Lancashire. Her crew survived. |
| Lothair | Canada | The barque was driven ashore near Esquimault, British Columbia. She was on a voyage from Miramichi, New Brunswick to Esquimault. |
| Monkwearmouth | United Kingdom | The brig was driven ashore at "Puhha Karri", near Reval, Russia. She was on a voyage from Newcastle upon Tyne, Northumberland to Port Kunda, Russia. |
| Sealcote | United Kingdom | The full-rigged ship foundered in Plettenburg Bay on or before 22 May. Her 27 crew were rescued. She was on a voyage from Rangoon, Burma to Falmouth, Cornwall. |
| Stefano Dimitri | Germany | The ship was wrecked near "Mlaska", Austria-Hungary. Her crew were rescued. She was on a voyage from Makarska, Austria-Hungary to Corfu, Greece. |
| HMS Tyrian | Royal Navy | The Britomart-class gunboat was driven ashore. She was refloated and taken in to Leith, Lothian. |
| William | Norway | The ship was driven ashore on Skagen, Denmark. She was refloated and resumed her voyage. |
| Unnamed | Flag unknown | The steamship was driven ashore at "Filsand", Saaremaa, Russia. |
