= Monks Kirby =

Village and civil parish in Warwickshire, England

Coordinates: 52.444°N 1.316°W

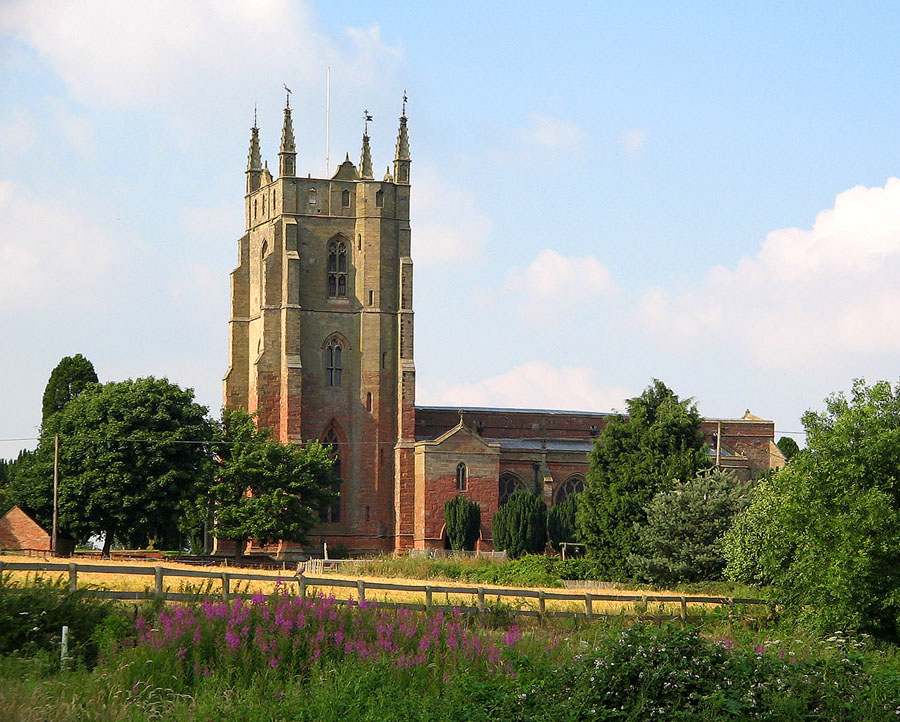
- St Edith's Church

- Location within Warwickshire
- Population: 445 (2011)
- OS grid reference: SP4683
- Civil parish: Monks Kirby
- District: Rugby
- Shire county: Warwickshire
- Region: West Midlands
- Country: England
- Sovereign state: United Kingdom
- Post town: RUGBY
- Postcode district: CV23
- Dialling code: 01788
- Police: Warwickshire
- Fire: Warwickshire
- Ambulance: West Midlands
- UK Parliament: Rugby

Monks Kirby is a village and civil parish in north-eastern Warwickshire, England. The population of the parish is 445. Monks Kirby is located around one mile east of the Fosse Way, around 8 miles north-west of Rugby, seven miles north-east of Coventry and six miles west of Lutterworth. Administratively it forms part of the borough of Rugby. One of the largest and most important villages in this part of Warwickshire in the Anglo-Saxon and later medieval period, the village continued to be a local administrative centre into the early 20th century.

The parish boundaries include two important landed estates: Newnham Paddox, seat of the family of the Earls of Denbigh since the 15th century and Newbold Revel, home of the medieval writer Sir Thomas Malory. Monks Kirby is today a small, attractive, wealthy commuter village with many residents working in Coventry, Birmingham, Leicester and London. Monks Kirby is dominated by the church of St Edith, a site of Christian worship since at least the 10th century and which functioned as a Priory in the Middle Ages. Reflecting its medieval aristocratic and ecclesiastical importance, Monks Kirby is the largest historic parish in Warwickshire and St Edith's one of the largest parish churches in the county. (Note: The claim that the church is the largest parish church in the county is often made. The "Cathedral Scale" Leamington Spa parish church which dates from the 19th century is bigger. However, Monks Kirby may well be the largest medieval parish church is in the county.)

== History ==
Monks Kirby Village Green

Monks Kirby has been inhabited since at least Roman times, with evidence (Roman urns and bricks) found around the Church suggesting either a Roman cemetery or villa on the current Church site.

=== Anglo-Saxon period and Norman Conquest ===
The size of the parish, good soils and strategic location (the village boundaries reached to High Cross - the meeting point of the Fosse Way and Watling Street) all point to the importance of the village before the Norman Conquest. Shortly after the Conquest, in 1086 Domesday Book records Monks Kirby as the largest settlement in this part of the country (North Warwickshire and South Leicestershire) - significantly larger than the settlements that would become today's towns and cities - Lutterworth, Rugby, Coventry and Birmingham.

The pre-Conquest church of Monks Kirby was the mother church (minster) for the surrounding area, connected to the important aristocratic estate of Newnham probably at least as far back as the eighth or ninth century. (Note: The 17th century historian of Warwickshire, Dugdale, cites the Anglo Saxon Chronicle and suggests that "this place" may have been built by Æthelflæd, daughter of Alfred the Great and queen of Mercia - a claim repeated on the current Church sign. Modern academics usually understand the Chronicle's reference to Æthelflæd building a fortification in Cyricbyrig in 917 as referring to the similarly named Shropshire village of Chirbury however, this is far from definitive: no evidence of the fortifications at Chirbury have ever been found. The church's dedication to St Edith of Polesworth may point to a link: St Edith was a saint connected to the Mercian Royal Family and Æthelflæd may have promoted churches dedicated to her.) In the 900s the village was on the frontier between the Viking controlled Danelaw and Anglo-Saxon Mercia. Monks Kirby is just on the west (Anglo-Saxon) side of Watling Street, which was the border. The village's name reflects the long-term influence of Danish settlement at the frontier: it is first recorded, in Latin, as Kirkberia in 1077 (see below); this is a mix of Danish English Kirk (church) and Anglo-Saxon bury meaning a fortified settlement. In time, the name became Kirkeby, (Note: Domesday Book in 1086 used the fully Anglo-Saxon form of the name Chircheberie. The definitive shift to "kir(k)" and from anglo-saxon "bury" to the Danish form "by" (which also happened in the name Rugby, originally Rocheberie) reflects the fact that people in the local area were speaking Danish-inflected English in the post-Conquest middle ages.) By the late 14th century the name was recorded by the Leicester chronicler Henry Knighton in close to its modern form as Monkys-kirkebi.

At the time of the Norman Conquest, the neighbouring estate of Newnham Paddox was owned by Leofwin, nephew of Leofric, Earl of Mercia (husband of Lady Godiva). After the Conquest, the land around Monks Kirby came into the ownership of Geoffrey de la Guerche, a Breton knight who married Aelgifu, Leofwin's daughter. Geoffrey rebuilt the Anglo Saxon church which had "burst asunder", possibly in fighting between Saxons and Normans in the immediate post-Conquest period. Geoffrey endowed the rebuilt church with lands (notably the village of Copston Magna), and gave it as a priory to the Benedictine Abbey of St Nicolas in Anjou in France.

The Priory was named in honour of the Virgin Mary and St Denis. Unusually, the text of the founding Charter for the Priory survives: (Note: The text of the charter survives but not the manuscript. The great historian of Warwickshire, Dugdale, ensured its survival by reproducing it from a manuscript in the Cotton Library which has since been lost or destroyed.) The dedication took place on 1 July 1077 and the Charter tells us the names of the first monks – Geoffrey, Ranulf, Stephen, Maurice, Roger and Herman. After Geoffrey's death, his estates, including the lands around Monks Kirby reverted to the King, who subsequently granted them to Nigel d'Aubigny, the father of Roger de Mowbray whose descendants were to become Earls of Nottingham and Dukes of Norfolk. The Newnham family (who took their name from the estate) are recorded as holding the Newnham Paddox Estate under the Mowbrays from the 1100s.

=== 1100–1500 ===
The twelfth and thirteenth centuries were Monks Kirby's highpoint. The monks produced at least one beautiful illuminated book and many miracles were apparently wrought at the Priory (see Monks Kirby Priory). In 1266 Henry III granted the monks a fair at Midsummer and a weekly market, a result of Monks Kirby's growing importance. The name of one of the village streets, Bond End, reflects the boundary between the feudal tenant farmers ("bondsmen") and the properties of the traders and craftsmen who operated around the Priory Church.

Through the fourteenth and early fifteenth century the Hundred Years War with France caused major problems for French-led priories like Monks Kirby. Money was short - the priory's estates were intermittently confiscated by the King - and discipline was poor: in 1330 Monks Kirby's Benedictines had needed to be reminded of basic rules such as the non-admission of women to the monastery, and their duty to the poor.

Having nearly fallen into ruin, the church was substantially rebuilt in around 1380. The basic structure and shape of the church today dates from this reconstruction, as well as one of the church's current eight bells. In 1415 Henry V agreed that the Duke of Norfolk could transfer the priory and its lands out of nominally French hands, to become a house of the Carthusian Abbey established on the Duke's estates at the Isle of Axholme, Lincolnshire. The Carthusians practised a strict monastic lifestyle and the revenues of Monks Kirby Priory provided most of their income but only two priests, and no monks, were maintained at Monks Kirby. The church was again altered in the late fifteenth century, and an octagonal spire was added which must have been an imposing local landmark.

=== 1500–1700 ===
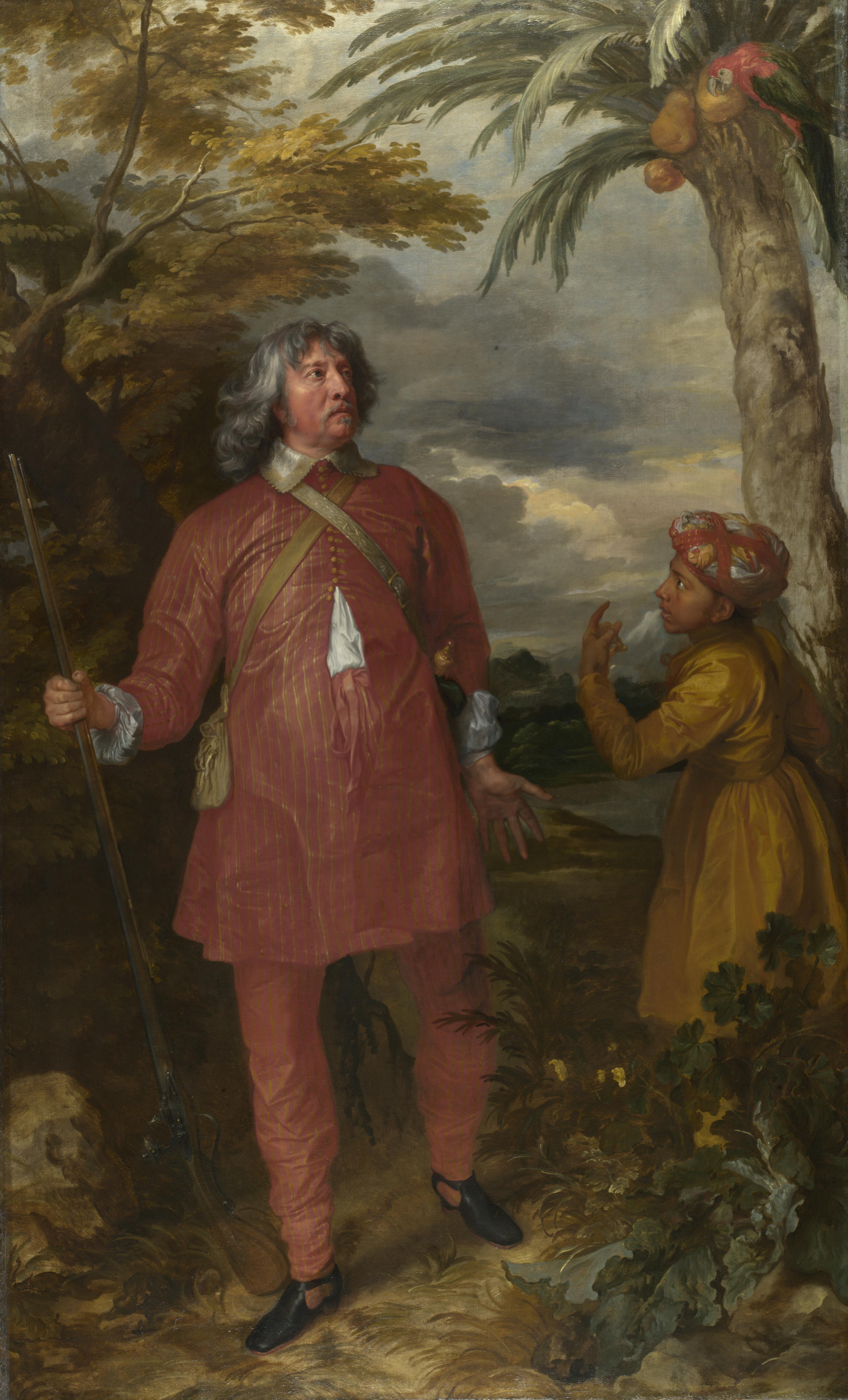
William Feilding, 1st Earl of Denbigh by Van Dyck. The Feilding Family have been owners of Newnham Paddox since 1433 and are descended from the Newnham family who held the estate from the 1100s.

The Newnham Paddox Estate was held by a number of different families in the fourteenth and early fifteenth century until, on 11 November 1433, John Fildyng, or Feilding bought the estate; he was a descendent of the earlier owners, the Newnham family. The Feildings expanded their estate by buying parts of the Monks Kirby manor (i.e. the lands that belonged to Monks Kirby priory) from the monks at Axholme in the late 1400s and early 1500s. In the Reformation, King Henry VIII confiscated the assets of Axholme Priory. He granted the rectory and the patronage of Monks Kirby vicarage and the income from the collection of local tithes to his foundation of Trinity College, Cambridge. The large and valuable manor of Monks Kirby (Note: At the time of its confiscation in 1539 the manor included lands in "Kyrkbye Monachorum, Waltou [Little Walton], Kyrkbye, Strcteston [Street Ashton], Shatunford [Sharnford], Wythebroke, Marston Jobott, Harborowe Parva, Cosford, Brynkelowe, Newbold-upon-Aven, Brokehurst, Newneham, Stretton, Gasnell [?], Paylton alias Palyngton, Copston, Kreyke [Crick], Rokebye [Rugby], Longlawforde, Harborowe Magna, Hale, Spede, Wolvaye, Wylley, Sester Woner [Cestersover] and Harpisforde, Warw.") was rapidly claimed by the powerful Charles Brandon, 1st Duke of Suffolk. (Note: Following the confiscation of Axholme, Monks Kirby manor was initially granted by the King in 1539 to Thomas Manning, Bishop of Ipswich, but Charles Brandon, brother-in-law of the King, moved quickly to take it from Manning)

In the 1600s the Feildings' status rose when William Feilding's handsome brother-in-law, George Villiers, became King James I's favourite: Villiers ended up as the immensely powerful Duke of Buckingham. Villiers' friends and family rose with him and William Feilding was made the first Earl of Denbigh. Even William's eight year old second son George (named after his important uncle) was given the right to his own earldom. (Note: The Earldom of Desmond. After the 2nd Earl of Denbigh died childless, subsequent earls of Desmond have also held the title Earl of Denbigh (see Earl of Denbigh).) Meanwhile, the Manor of Monks Kirby had passed to descendants of Charles Brandon until it was bought by George Villiers' mother Mary, Countess of Buckingham who bequeathed it to her grandson Basil Feilding, the second Earl of Denbigh on her death in 1632. The Feilding family thus came to own much of Monks Kirby, both the historic Newnham Paddox estate and the lands that in the medieval period had belonged to the Priory Church of Monks Kirby.

=== 1700 to 21st century ===
The Church's spire blew down in a storm on Christmas Night 1701. The enclosure of farming land in the eighteenth and nineteenth century saw the wealthy land owners of Monks Kirby deprive local people of their traditional access to common land. The Skipwith family, lords of Newbold Revel in the 1700s, extensively used their position as Members of Parliament to promote enclosure acts on behalf of their own family and friends, including the land at Stretton-under-Fosse.

The most notorious incident in the Monks Kirby enclosure process happened in 1837 when the 7th Earl of Denbigh wanted to rent a large parcel of land, Pailton Pastures, from the other major landowner, Trinity College, Cambridge. (Note: As part of the Enclosure process, Trinity College had rescinded its rights to collect local tithes, granted by Henry VIII; instead the Denbighs and other local landowners agreed that the College could take ownership of common land in Pailton. The College developed the land as farms - Tithe Farm and Pailton Pastures Farm on Montilo Lane - for ongoing rental income.) This involved clearing the land of its sitting tenants. There were riots by Pailton residents. One particular very elderly tenant, Thomas Gubbins, stood in the way of the Earl and the College's plan. The Earl pursued the case until Gubbins - said to have been over 100 years old - was sent to prison where he soon died. This was scandalous even at the time: the county newspaper wrote, "We may well wonder what could have been the feelings of a plaintiff [ie the Earl of Denbigh] in a case such as this. Is he now satisfied?" Gubbins became known as the Pailton Martyr.

The Rector of Monks Kirby - appointed by Trinity College, Cambridge - played an eager part in the prosecution of Gubbins. (Note: The Reverend Richard Podmore, Rector of Monks Kirby from 1786 to 1838 is notable not just for his very long tenure, but also for his far greater interest in maximising Trinity College's revenues than in the wellbeing of his flock.) The 7th Earl Denbigh and his wife Lady Mary are both buried in St Edith's Church.

With the Church of England so clearly on the side of the powerful, it is unsurprising that many ordinary Monks Kirby residents turned to nonconformist churches from the 17th to the early 20th century. Nonconformity in the Parish dated back to the time of Oliver Cromwell and a Baptist congregation was established in 1817, its members initially suffering much persecution. The Baptist chapel]] was built at the end of Bell Lane, on the edge of the village, just outside the Earl of Denbigh's lands. It had 150 seats and was demolished around 1960.

The 18th- and 19th-century enclosure process led to the establishment of larger, tenanted farms on the Denbigh, Newbold Revel and Trinity College, Cambridge lands: the distinctive Victorian farm buildings are a major feature of the rural landscape around Monks Kirby. The tenant farmers formed the dominant rural middle class in Monks Kirby society from the Victorian era to the mid twentieth century. The Monks Kirby Farmers Club Show was the major event of their year, with hundreds of cows and horses exhibited and, at its peak in 1914, 7,000 people attending. (Note: 1914 was the highpoint: the show went into decline with the First World War, though it lasted until 1932. One rather surprising visitor to the 1898 Monks Kirby Farmers Club Show was the Aga Khan who was on a visit to England and, after meeting Queen Victoria, was staying with the Earl of Denbigh at Newnham Paddox) Trinity College retains the benefice today (and therefore is still involved in appointing the vicar) but divested itself of substantial landholdings around Monks Kirby following the Second World War. Similarly, The Feilding family have – since the mid-twentieth century – steadily sold off much of their estate (for example selling 2,500 acres of the historic Newnham Paddox estate in 2014–15).

== Parish boundaries ==
The historic parish boundaries of Monks Kirby, existing from the medieval era through to the nineteenth century included several neighbouring villages and hamlets: Copston Magna, Pailton, Stretton-under-Fosse, Newbold Revel, Brockhurst, Little Walton, Street Ashton and Easenhall. (Note: The Anglo-Saxon boundaries of the parish were probably even bigger, stretching far into Leicestershire. Withybrook was part of Monks Kirby Parish in the early post-Conquest period but became a separate parish in the 1200s.) The Parish had an exclave in Leicestershire, the land known as Goresland in Ullesthorpe, separated from Monks Kirby by the neighbouring parish of Wibtoft and just over the county border. Monks Kirby was the largest parish in Warwickshire; (Note: Parish size can be compared on the Church of England's online map of ecclesiastical parishes; the CoE's map shows two Warwickshire parishes bigger than Monks Kirby but these are 21st century mergers and the historic parish of Monks Kirby included Copston Magna and Easenhall, which the CoE now classify as a separate parishes. The claim in Monks Kirby Parish Council's 2015 Neighbourhood Plan that the village was once one of the largest parishes in England seems unlikely.) the historic size of Monks Kirby was around 10,000 acres, 15 square miles. Around 1866, Pailton, Easenhall, Stretton-under-Fosse and Copston became separate parishes. Even within its much reduced modern boundaries, Monks Kirby civil parish still has an area of 4550 acres, around 7 square miles, placing it in top 11% of English parishes by area. The ecclesiastical parish no longer includes Copston or Easenhall but still includes Pailton and Stretton-under-Fosse. The (civil and ecclesiastical) boundaries of Monks Kirby still include the lands of the village of Cestersover, abandoned in the Middle Ages.

== Local government ==
Early in the 17th century the hundred of Knightlow (one of the county's four administrative divisions) was reorganised on a basis of four High Constables' divisions – Kenilworth, Monks Kirby, Rugby, and Southam. Monks Kirby retained its high constable until 1828. From 1834 the civil parish of Monks Kirby was part of Lutterworth Poor Law Union meaning people living in poverty in Monks Kirby were sent to the workhouse in Lutterworth. The Lutterworth Rural Sanitary District was introduced in 1875 covering the same area as the Poor Law Union. Rural Sanitary Districts (RSDs) were replaced with rural districts and aligned with county borders in 1894: Monks Kirby Rural District existed from 1894 to 1932 covering the Warwickshire parishes that had been in the Lutterworth RSD. In 1932 Monks Kirby Rural District was merged into Rugby Rural District, which in turn merged with Rugby Municipal Borough in 1974, to form today's Rugby Borough Council.

== Monks Kirby today ==
Monks Kirby's population today is only slightly higher than that recorded in the Domesday Book, far lower than the village's population in the nineteenth century and probably the twelfth and thirteenth century too. Since the 1950s the primarily agricultural population of the village has been replaced by a wealthy, well-educated older demographic through a process of extended suburbanisation from the many nearby towns and cities. Residents are attracted by the quiet, well-kept village, with good road connections. The village is in the Coventry Green Belt. Apart from one village pub, The Denbigh Arms, (Note: The pub was named The Cock until the early twentieth century) the village now has no shops or other commercial enterprises. There are two churches: St Edith's Anglican Church and St Joseph's Roman Catholic Church. There is also a well-used village hall and the Revel school. The village has moved significantly since the medieval era and particularly in the last seventy years. While the historic village was centred around the parish church, the centre of the village today is further to the north-east: the village has merged with Brockhurst which was a separate hamlet on the other side of the Smite brook.

== Roman Catholic community ==
Monks Kirby has been a local centre for the Roman Catholic faith since the conversion of Rudolph, the 8th Earl of Denbigh to Catholicism in 1850. St Joseph's convent and girls school/orphanage were established in the village in the 1870s. The first nuns were Sisters of Charity from a convent on the Earl's other estate at Pantasaph in Flintshire, North Wales. The Sisters of Charity were succeeded by the Sisters of Mercy in 1923. During the Second World War, The 10th Earl of Denbigh handed over Newnham Paddox House to another community of nuns: Cannonesses of the Holy Sepulchre. These nuns had evacuated their convent, New Hall in Chelmsford in 1940, due to the threat of bombing. During the war, the Canonesses ran a school for local children. They returned to New Hall in 1945.

The Sisters of Mercy remained at the Monks Kirby convent until 1977. In 1982 the convent was occupied by the first congregation of Mary, Mother of the Church (now called "Mater Ecclesiae") established by Sister Catherine Mulligan as a new convent for mature women looking to enter religious life. In 1998 the Mater Ecclesiae congregation moved to Street Ashton House in the neighbouring hamlet of Street Ashton, where it was based until 2020. The remaining, elderly sisters have now dispersed and Street Ashton House sold, bringing to an end a 150-year tradition of (renewed) monastic life in Monks Kirby.

The nineteenth century convent buildings in the village of Monks Kirby have now been converted to housing but a new church, St Joseph's Church, was built in the 1990s to a design by the architect John Holmes. This church was consecrated by the Archbishop of Birmingham, Bernard Longley, on 11 July 2012, the feast of St Benedict. St Joseph's continues to be a worshipping community today, with a large congregation gathering on Sundays from the parish which spreads beyond the small village of Monks Kirby. There is Mass several times each week. Highlights during the year include the Annual May Procession when the parish process in honour of Our Lady ending with the crowning of the statue and Benediction of the Blessed Sacrament. There is also a Corpus Christi procession in June from the Village Green to St Joseph's. In July 2018 St Joseph's fitted a new bell system which allows the Angelus to be rung at 12 noon and 6pm as well as calling the faithful to Mass. At special times of the year and at the end of the school day Hymns are played on the automated carillon.

The present parish priest is Fr Paul. On the outskirts of Monks Kirby is a Roman Catholic burial site, originally a private graveyard for the Feilding family but which today is used for burials from St Joseph's. The Chapel of the Sacred Heart at the burial ground was designed by the architect Thomas Henry Wyatt as part of the remodelling of Newnham Paddox House, undertaken for the eighth earl in 1888.

== The Revel School ==
Children from Monks Kirby and surrounding villages attend the Revel School, which is possibly unique in that it is a Church of England school with Roman Catholic provision and Catechesis. Children from the school regularly visit the Catholic Church for worship and are prepared through the school for their First Holy Communion. Both the Church of England Rector and Catholic Parish Priest lead worship in the school. School Masses (within St Joseph's) take place regularly.

== Newnham Paddox ==
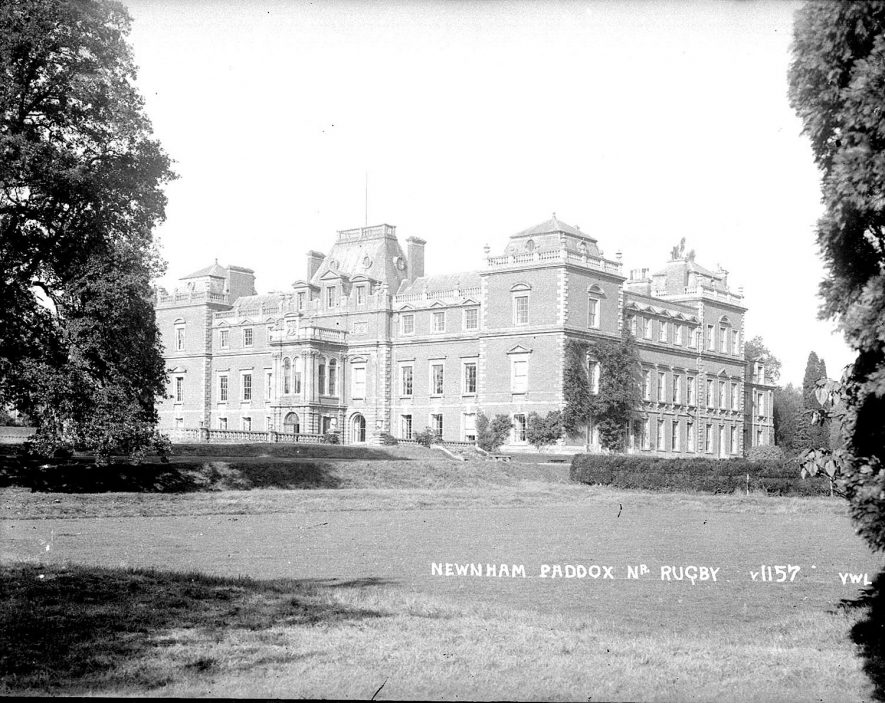
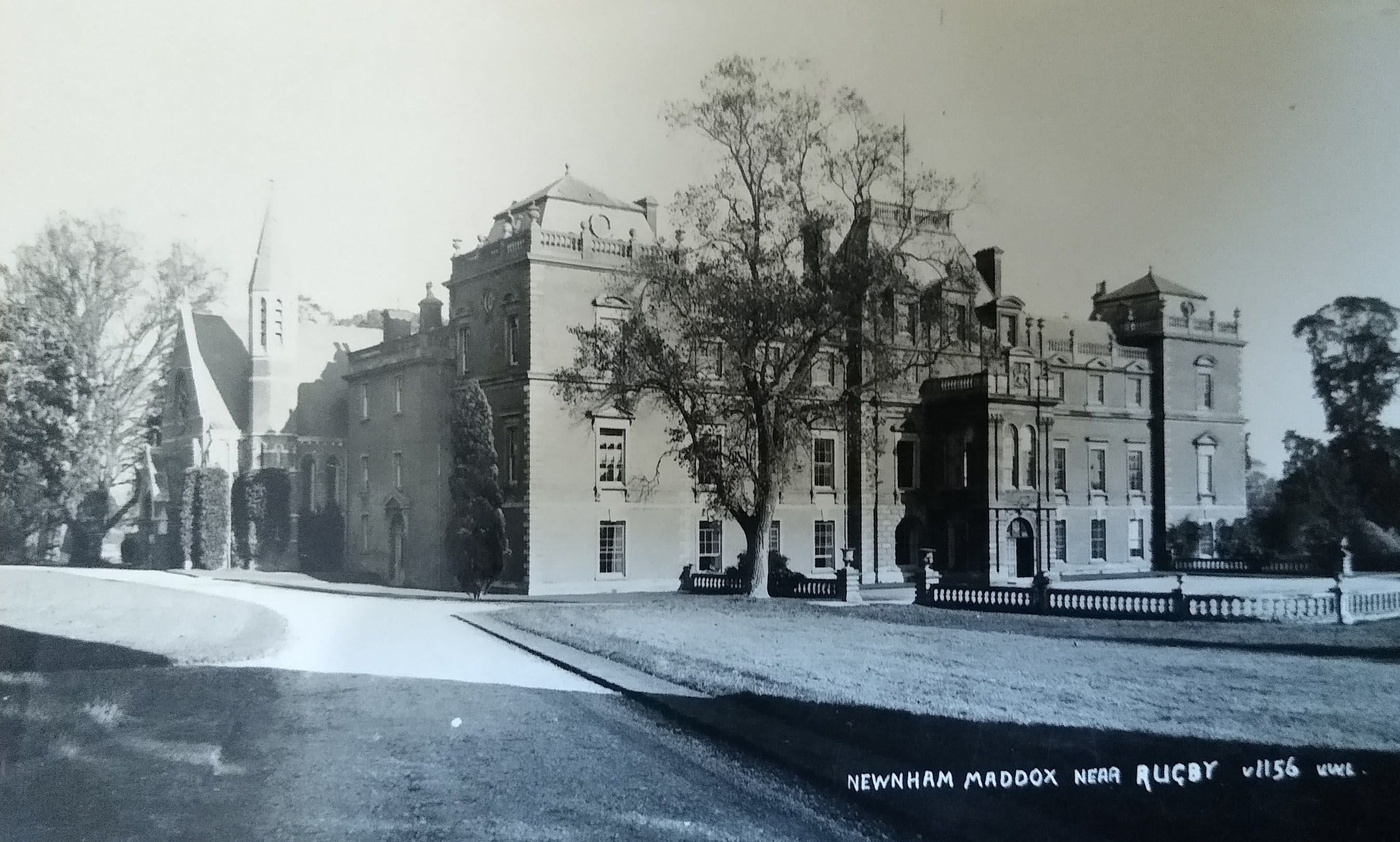
Two views of Newnham Paddox House built 1876-1879 to a design by architect Thomas Henry Wyatt. The house was demolished in 1952.

The Newnham Paddox estate neighbours Monks Kirby and is the seat of the Earl of Denbigh. Much of the estate has been sold in recent decades. The estate was very ancient, probably dating from the post-Roman, Anglo-Saxon invasion period when new settlements were established (hence New-ham). A very large manor house existed on the estate until 1952, which had at least three stages of development:

- There was a large, probably timber-framed house (with 34 hearths) built in the late 16th or early 17th century. In the late 1600s, grand formal gardens were laid out with an immense series of pools (known as the "Great Canal") running behind and alongside the house. These can be seen in an engraving produced in 1707.
- In 1754-68 Lancelot "Capability" Brown built a large mansion house for the fifth and sixth Earls (perhaps incorporating elements of the earlier house). At the same time, Brown removed the formal gardens replacing them with landscaped garden in his distinctive style.
- In the late 19th century, the house was substantially redeveloped in the French style including an ornate Roman Catholic chapel, by the architect Thomas Henry Wyatt. This nineteenth-century house was demolished in 1952 after receiving water damage resulting from the thawing of frozen pipes at a time when the family was hit by heavy death duties.

There is very little information on the Capability Brown house. However, in 2020, archaeologists discovered that, "The former manor designed by Capability Brown at Newnham Paddox was still extant just below the turf level." A full excavation of the site was scheduled to begin in the same year. The grand gates, stables and Brown's landscaped gardens remain. A wooden-framed house was erected for the then Earl in 1982; by the early twenty-first century this had fallen into disrepair and in 2023 it was replaced by a 7-bay house designed to echo the classical style of the Capability Brown house which had stood on the site. The grounds of the house are opened at least annually for a popular springtime "Daffodil Sunday" event when thousands of daffodils come in to flower across the grounds. .

== Sources ==
- Warwickshire Towns & Villages, by Geoff Allen (2000) (ISBN 1-85058-642-X)
