= Strangford (disambiguation) =

Strangford is a village in County Down, Northern Ireland.

Strangford may also refer to:

- Strangford (Assembly constituency), a constituency in the Northern Ireland Assembly
- Strangford (UK Parliament constituency), a constituency in the U.K. House of Commons
- Strangford, Herefordshire, a location in England
- Strangford Lough, a large sea lough or inlet
- Viscount Strangford, a title in the Peerage of Ireland
- Percy Smythe, 6th Viscount Strangford (1780–1855), an Anglo-Irish diplomat sometimes referred to as "Lord Strangford"
