= Monks Kirby Rural District =

Former local government district in Warwickshire, United Kingdom

Coordinates: 52.45°N 1.30°W

Monks Kirby RD
- History
  - Created: 1894
  - Abolished: 1932
  - Succeeded by: Rugby Rural District
- Status: Rural district
  - HQ: Monks Kirby

The Monks Kirby Rural District was a rural district of Warwickshire between 1894 and 1932, based on the part of the Lutterworth Rural Sanitary District which was in Warwickshire. Its council was based in the village of Monks Kirby.

The district consisted of six civil parishes of

- Copston Magna
- Monks Kirby
- Pailton
- Stretton-under-Fosse
- Wibtoft
- Willey

Due to its small size (its population was recorded as 1,456 in 1931) the district was abolished in 1932 and merged into the Rugby Rural District, under the review caused by the Local Government Act 1929. The area is now part of the present borough of Rugby.
