= High Cross, Leicestershire =

Historic site and locality in England

High Cross
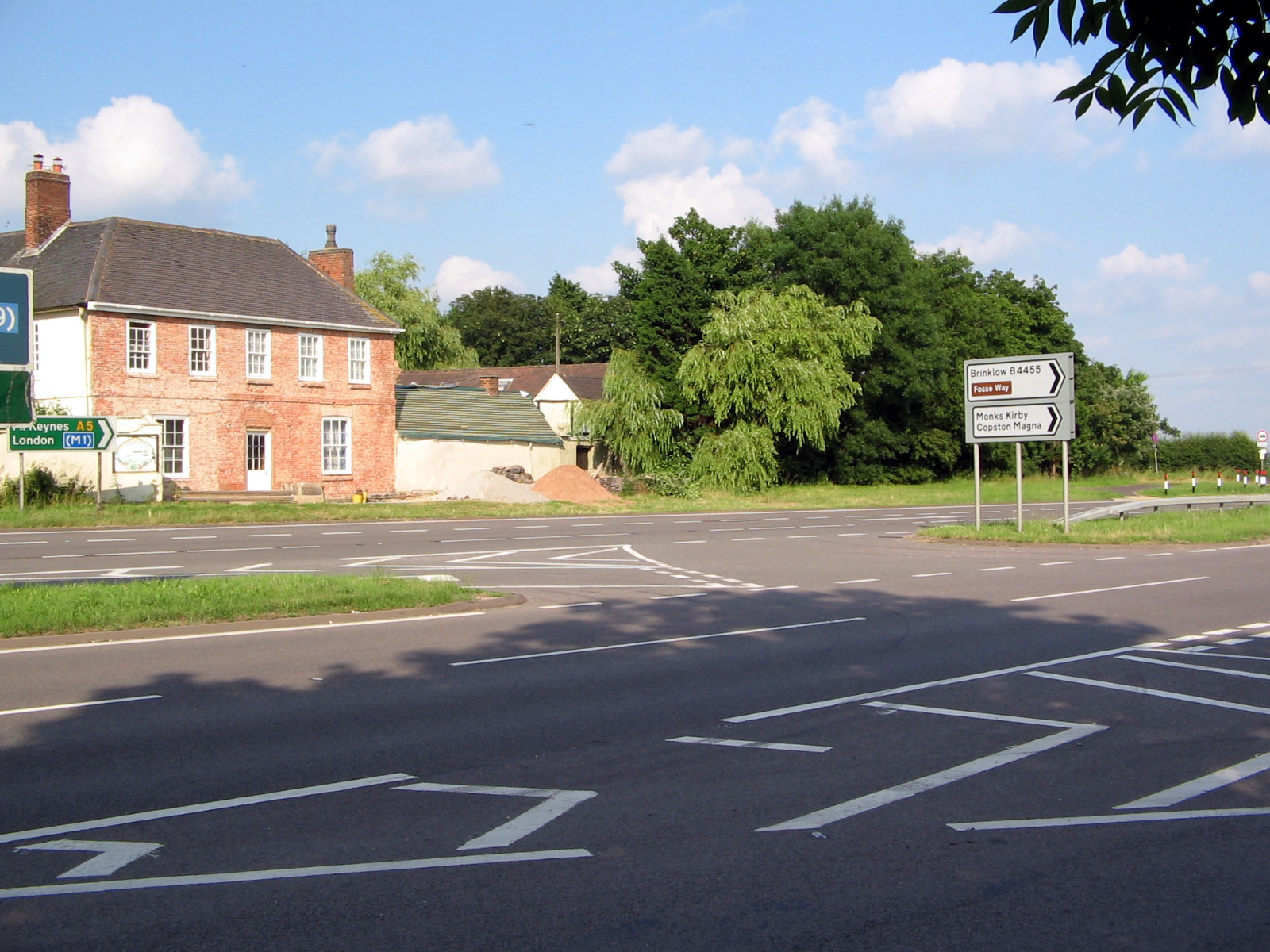
- High Cross today
- Interactive map of High Cross
- Town/City: Border of Warwickshire and Leicestershire, England
- Coordinates: 52°29′37″N 1°18′19″W

High Cross is the name given to the crossroads of the Roman roads of Watling Street (now the A5) and Fosse Way on the border between Leicestershire and Warwickshire, England. A naturally strategic high point, High Cross was "the central cross roads" of Anglo-Saxon and Roman Britain. It was the site of a Romano-British settlement known as Venonae or Venonis, with an accompanying fort.

High Cross has marked several frontiers through history. In the Iron Age the area is believed to have been the frontier between the Corieltauvi and Dobunni tribes. (Note: Abigail Tomkins lists several academic publications dating from 1973 to 2007 which "whilst not in total agreement regarding the exact location, have all argued that the frontier between the Corieltauvi and the Dobunni lay in the northeastern part of the Avon Valley, broadly in the region of Watling Street.") In the Roman era, the Fosse Way delimited Roman settlement in the early period of occupation. In the later Anglo-Saxon period, Watling Street was the border between the Viking controlled Danelaw and Saxon territory. Reflecting this, the boundaries of four parishes (boundaries which began to be established from the Anglo-Saxon period or even earlier) still meet today at High Cross, while the border between Leicester and Warwickshire, established in the early 11th century, reflects the Danelaw boundary.

== Geography ==
Almost exactly equidistant between the cities of Leicester and Coventry, High Cross is located eight miles from the point (at Lindley Hall Farm in Fenny Drayton) today identified by the Ordnance Survey as the geographical centre of England. High Cross is the midpoint on the main watershed of England: it is situated above three river valleys. The Avon flows southwest to the Severn Estuary and the Irish sea at Bristol; the Anker flows West; and the Soar flows North. Both the Soar and the Anker, via the Trent and then the Humber, flow ultimately to the North Sea at Kingston on Hull.

As denoted by its name, High Cross is at the top of a hill. An account of the site in a popular magazine of 1827 claimed that, "The ground here is so high, and the surrounding country so low and flat, that it is said, fifty-seven churches may be seen from this spot by the help of a glass [telescope]." This extensive area of relatively flat land is, on the Warwickshire side, between Rugby and Bedworth/ Nuneaton, referred to by geographers as the High Cross Plateau.

== Roman period ==
Watling Street north of St Albans. The map shows the Roman towns established along Watling Street by the end of the first century AD.

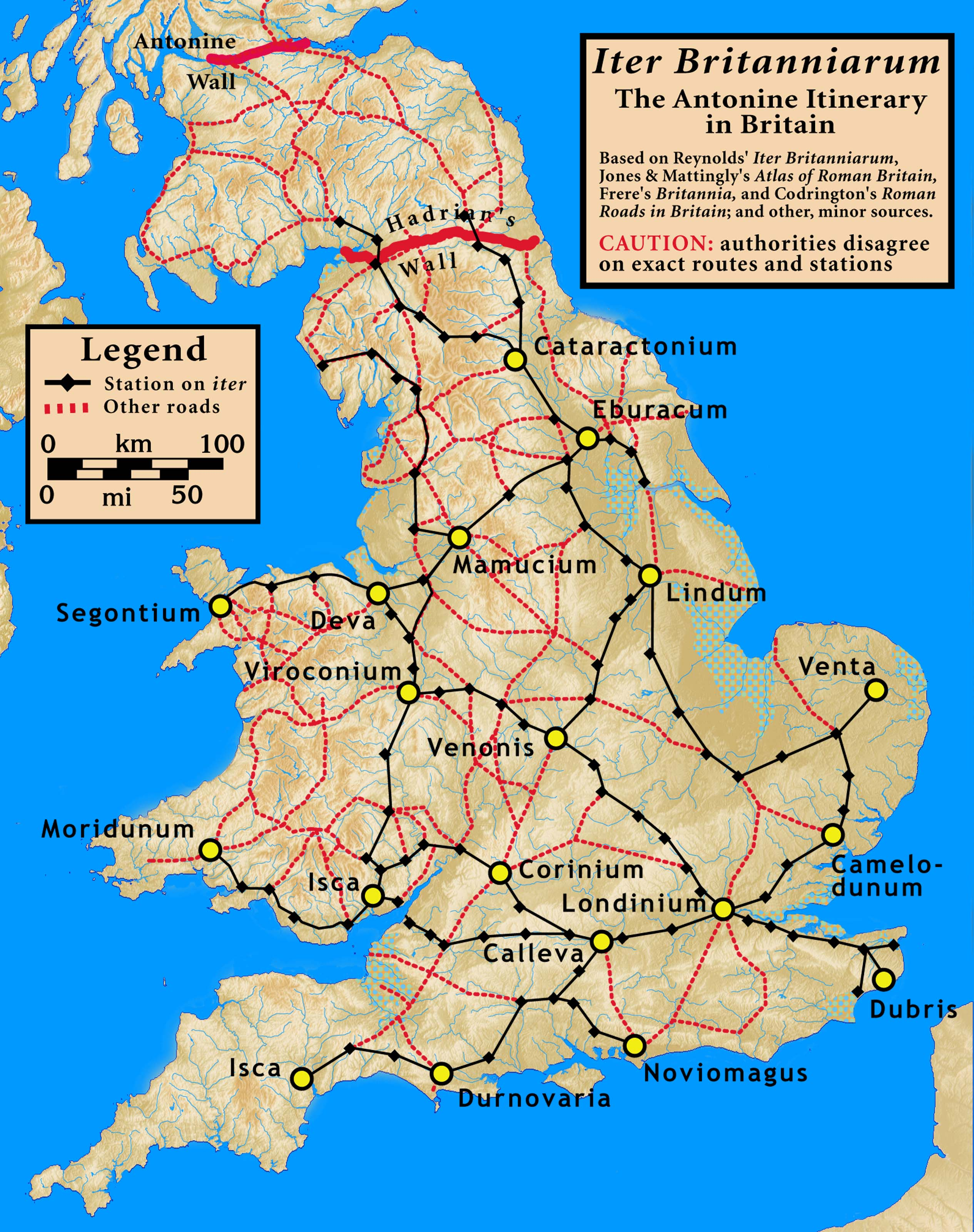
A map of the known Roman road network, highlighting the routes included in the Antonine Itinerary

While the exact point of the Roman Fosse Way and Watling Street junction is unknown, historians agree to its location around the current meeting point of the two roads, High Cross. The Roman name Venonae (also sometimes Venonis or Venoni) (Note: The different forms of the name reflect different analyses of the grammar in the original Latin text of the Antonine Itinerary: the original text uses "Venonis" but -is is a dative case ending, meaning the name of the settlement was Venonae, Venoni or Venona.) is known from the Antonine Itinerary, a contemporary register of the stations and distances along various Roman roads likely produced at the end of the third century. (Note: The first historian to identify High Cross with Venonae was William Camden (1551–1623). The Victoria County History for Leicestershire observes that "The Antonine Itinerary places Venonae at the spot where these roads [Watling Street and Fosse Way] cross, and also assigns to Venonae distances from other places known to us – Manduessedum [today Mancetter] and Bannaventa [in Northamptonshire] – which agree satisfactorily with the actual mileage, it is natural that there should have been general agreement among archaeologists, since Camden, to identify Venonae and High Cross.") The etymology of the name Venonae is uncertain. (Note: It may relate to a Celtic word denoting love or family (related to the Latin word "Venus"). Academic A. L. F. Rivet tentatively suggests that an etymology of Venonae could be "a goddess name *Uenond, something like 'The Loveable One', used as a river-name and, with formative suffix, this applied to a town; perhaps *Uenonion." But Rivet goes on to note that "This is very hazardous.")

Venonae may have been the meeting point for Roman regiments in their final battle against Boudica, sometimes called 'The Battle of Watling Street' which would have been fought nearby.

=== Fort ===
The first Roman structure at High Cross was a fort, located about 1 km to the North West from the current High Cross, dating to the first few years of the Roman occupation (AD 44–47). This was in the period when the Fosse Way represented the limits (if not a formal frontier) of Roman colonisation. The fort predated the Roman construction of Watling Street in the 60sAD, which built over some of the structures of the fort. The fort had two entrances on the North West and south-east sides with a timber gateway on the South East. There was a turf rampart, 3 meters wide and V-shaped ditch. "Internal features located were the cobbled intervallum-street [a perimeter street that ran around the ramparts], part of a barrack-building, and a water-tank near the east angle". The fort was discovered in the late 1960s from the air by the pioneer of aerial archaeology, Kenneth St Joseph.

=== Settlement ===
A settlement around the current High Cross site evolved somewhat later than the fort with evidence showing "continuous Romano-British occupation from the late-first to the fourth centuries A.D." Historians of the seventeen and eighteenth century reported very extensive, visible Roman ruins around High Cross, leading to belief that Venonae was a major Roman settlement. However, modern archaeology, undertaken since the start of the 20th century, has found more limited evidence. Historians today usually describes Venonae as a "small town." A 2004 map of the Roman settlement based on the archaeological fieldwork shows - as well as the fort - two enclosures and fortifications in the immediate area around the crossroads and remains of a villa 450 metres due east of the crossroad.

== Monument ==
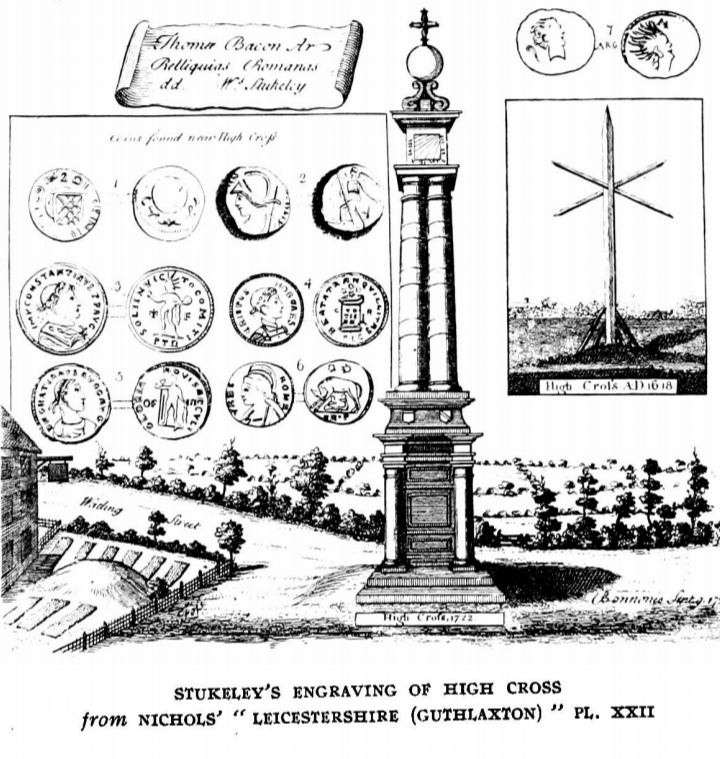

A stone monument at High Cross was built in 1712. Funded by the local landowner, the Earl of Denbigh, it celebrated the victories against France by the Duke of Marlborough as well as marking the centre of Roman Britain. It consisted of four Doric columns with an orb and cross above. It was struck by lightning in 1791 and only the plinth remains today. The stone monument was preceded by a wooden cross and was the site of a medieval gibbet.

The two Latin inscriptions on either side the monument have been translated as:

The noblemen and gentry, ornaments of the neighbouring counties of Warwick and Leicester, at the instances of the Right Honourable Basil Earl of Denbeigh, have caused this pillar to be erected in grateful as well as perpetual remembrance of Peace at last restored by her Majesty Queen Anne, in the year of our Lord, 1712.

If, traveller, you search for the footsteps of the ancient Romans, here you may behold them. For here their most celebrated ways, crossing one another, extend to the utmost boundaries of Britain; here the Vennones kept their quarters; and at the distance of one mile from hence, Claudius, a certain commander of a cohort, seems to have had a camp, towards the street, and towards the foss a tomb.

== Modern highways ==
This section of Watling Street is now a dual carriageway section of the A5, the southern part of the Fosse Way is a B road, and the northern route of the Fosse is now a track which is a part of a long-distance path called the Leicestershire Round.

== Governance ==
Four civil parish boundaries meet at High Cross: the Warwickshire parishes of Wibtoft and Copston Magna (historically part of Monks Kirby parish) and the Leicestershire parishes of Sharnford and Claybrooke Parva (historically part of the single Claybrooke parish with the closely adjacent village of Claybrooke Magna).

High Cross is depicted on the coat of arms of Blaby District Council, which is the local authority for the area. Two black diagonal lines on the shield represent Fosse Way and Watling Street.
