= Cestersover =

Coordinates: 52.435°N 1.260°W

- Location within Warwickshire
- Civil parish: Pailton
- District: Rugby
- Shire county: Warwickshire
- Region: West Midlands
- Country: England
- Sovereign state: United Kingdom
- Police: Warwickshire
- Fire: Warwickshire
- Ambulance: West Midlands

Cestersover is a deserted village in Warwickshire, England, now in the civil parish of Pailton.

== History ==
It was a hamlet of Monks Kirby and was site of a watermill, a sizeable village and a chapel. The manor of Cestersover was held by the Waver (or Wara) family from at least the Norman Conquest; and the name of the village derives from Thester Wara (meaning "the Eastern" Wara).

The village was abandoned around 1467 when Henry Waver, who had made his fortune as a London draper (and was appointed a Sheriff of London) was granted permission to rebuild the ancient manor with turrets and crenelations and to enclose 500 acres of land.

The Waver family of Cestersover may be the related that which gave their name to Wavers Marston near Solihull. In 1325 Thomas le Tailor of Wavers Marston was pardoned by the King after killing Ralph Golding of Cestersover.

== Current state ==
Today, remains of a moat and parts of the old manor are visible.
