= Monks Kirby Priory =

Benedictine priory established in 1077 in Warwickshire, England

Coordinates: 52.4444°N 1.3199°W

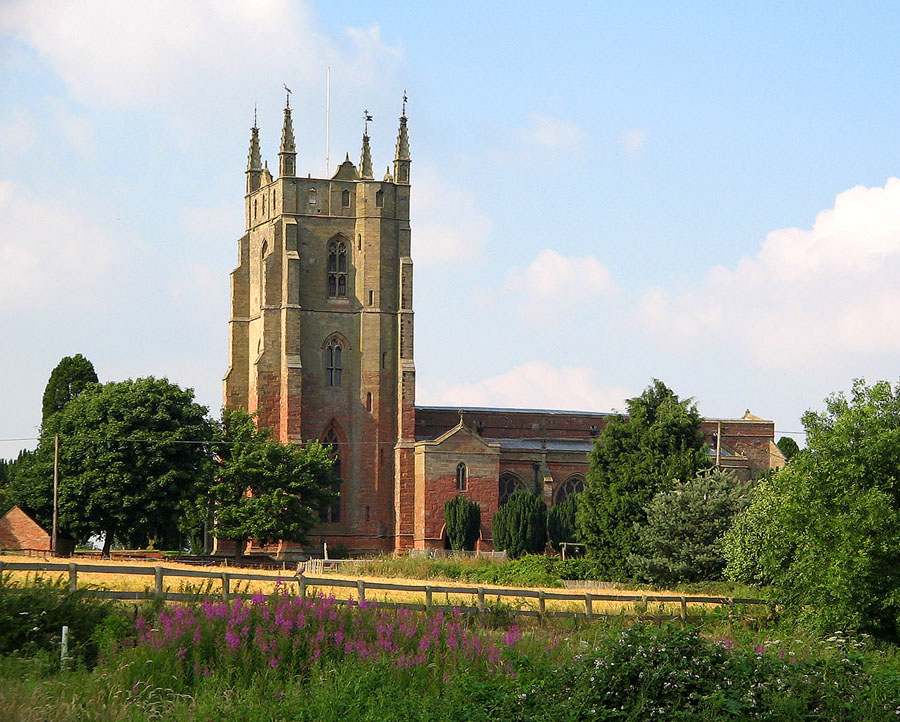
St Edith's Church, Monks Kirby

Monks Kirby Priory was a Benedictine priory established in 1077 in Monks Kirby, Warwickshire, England. The priory was suppressed in 1415 when its estates and revenues were given to the Carthusian priory of Axholme in Lincolnshire, in whose possession they continued until the Reformation. Remains of the priory form part of Monks Kirby village church today.

== Foundation, 1077 ==
Based on the very large size of the parish of Monks Kirby, the name of the village (kirk-by) and other indications (see Monks Kirby) the Church of Monks Kirby is understood to have been a minster in the Anglo-Saxon era. After the Conquest, the land around Monks Kirby came into the ownership of Geoffrey de la Guerche, a Breton knight. Geoffrey rebuilt the Anglo Saxon church which had been "burst asunder", possibly in fighting between Saxons and Normans in the immediate post-Conquest period.

Geoffrey established the rebuilt church as an alien priory subject to the Benedictine Abbey of St. Nicholas at Angers. The text of the foundation charter for the priory survives, dated 1 July 1077. A "remarkable" survival, it provides evidence of what is often assumed to have happened after the Conquest but is rarely clearly attested – a marriage between the new Norman lord of a territory, Geoffrey, and the daughter of the previous Anglo-Saxon lord. Geoffrey's bride was Ælgifu, daughter of Leofwin of Newnham, a relative of Leofric, Earl of Mercia and his wife Lady Godiva. The marriage between Geoffrey and Ælgifu would not imply that no violence had been done to Leofwin, or even to Ælgifu.

In the charter, Geoffrey on behalf of Ælgifu and himself, granted to the new priory the church of Kirby and two priests. He granted some of his local land (notably the village of Copston Magna) and the rights to other tithes and revenues from his estates across the country. The Monks Kirby Priory was named in honour of the Virgin Mary and St Denis. The Charter tells us the names of the first monks, brought from France – Geoffrey, Ranulf, Stephen, Maurice, Roger, and Herman. Based on their names, Herman may have been of Lotharingian origin, while the other five monks were French. The two priests, Frano and Osgot, are assumed to have been the priests of the pre-Conquest church. Like the village itself, they have Scandinavian names.

== The Benedictine priory ==
=== The twelfth and thirteenth century: a powerful priory ===
After Geoffrey's death, his estates, including the lands around Monks Kirby reverted to the King, who subsequently granted them to Nigel d'Aubigny, the father of Roger de Mowbray whose descendants were to become Earls of Nottingham and Dukes of Norfolk.

Through the 12th century, the priory grew in importance. New grants of land and revenues were given by the Mowbray family and others. No doubt the fact that the Plantagenet family – who came from Angers – had taken over the English throne increased Monks Kirby priory's profile. In the 1170s Richard of Waterville was a monk at Angers who was sent to become Prior of Monks Kirby. He went on to become Prior of Whitby where he played a key part in that town's establishment and is said to staged an archery competition for Robin Hood and Little John.

Little is known of the layout of the monastery though it must have had a library and possibly a scriptorium as one manuscript from the priory is still in existence, a beautiful illuminated work from the late 12th century. The manuscript is now in the collection of Balliol College, Oxford (Balliol MS240). The Balliol manuscript includes a "Long account of how an image of the virgin and child in the church of Kirkebi frustrated two thieves one of whom was afterwards converted and paid regular annual visits to the Priory."

Just one vestige of the twelfth century building have been found: a small partial excavation in 1977 along the north wall of the church found a blocked doorway with cylindrical columns with chevron ornaments (typical of late norman architecture), dated to this period.

The earliest surviving parts of the priory church (now the parish church) date from a thirteenth-century rebuilding. In another sign of the priory's growing importance in the thirteen century, in 1266 Henry III granted the monks a fair at Midsummer and a weekly market at Kirby.

=== The Fourteenth Century: collapse of the monastic community ===
The late 14th century saw a further rebuilding of the priory church substantially as we see it today. One of the church's bells, still in use today, dates from this reconstruction.

However, the rebuilding happened after almost of century profound disuption:the Hundred Years War with France saw the collapse of the monastic community, with the Abbot at Angers losing control through much of the period as - across the country - the revenues of French-led (so called "alien") priories were claimed by the King, and foreign monks were expelled.

The disruption to alien priories began in 1295 with the outbreak of war with French and when the King began to claim revenues on the estate of the alien priories. By 1330 substantial problems were reported in Monks Kirby Priory. The Benedictine monkss had needed to be reminded by the Bishop of basic rules such as the non-admission of women to the monastery, and their duty to the poor.

In 1360, the monks wrote to the pope noting that "Christ has wrought many miracles in honour of His Mother in the church of the said priory" but that the church was "old and in danger of ruin": the monks wanted to raise money by granting generous penance to visiting pilgrims who gave donations to support the fabric of the church.

In 1376, with the alien priories under ever-increasing pressure, a French knight who was fighting for the English, Thierry de Robessart, Baron of Canoun, Seigneur d’Escaillon (known in English records as Sir Canon Robsart) negotiated with the Abbot of Angers for a 25-year lease of the Kirby Priory lands. English royal records confirm the King's agreement to the lease: they note that Robsart had paid the Abbot "a great price" for the lease and obliged Robsart to pay £40 annually to the King in taxes on the estate. Thierry de Robessart died in 1387 and in 1390 the King confirmed Thierry's son Jean (or John) in possession of the lease for the remainder of the 25-year term.

The Robsarts maintained only two monks at the priory. The Abbot of Angers - long dispossed of revenue from the priory - wrote to Thomas Mowbray, Earl of Nottingham offering to release the land and the priory to the Earl "on easy terms." In 1396, Mowbray took up to the offer. He wrote a letter to the Pope that has been summarised as saying: "The number of the monks at Kirby Priory, founded by his progenitor for seven monks, and subjected to the monastery of St Nicholas, Angiers, had long not been maintained, and only two monks resided (besides the prior); that the rule was not observed; that the goods were not expended for pious uses; that on account of the dissolute life of the prior and French monks living there, and of their servants, who were at discord with the English, and on account of the wars between the two realms, the buildings were partially falling." Mowbray wished for the priory and its revenues to be transferred to the Carthusian Abbey he was establishing on the Isle of Axholme in Lincolnshire.

It took a further 20 years for Mowbray's request to be granted: in 1399 relations between England and France had improved, and the rights of the Abbey at Angers to their houses in England, including Monks Kirby, were restored. The good relations between the countries did not last. In 1415 the Axholme Carthusians were put in possession of Monks Kirby priory and its revenues and, after 338 years, the Benedictines left Monks Kirby.

== Transfer to the Carthusians ==
In 1415 Henry V agreed that the Duke of Norfolk could transfer the priory and its lands out of nominally French hands, to become a house of the Carthusian Abbey established on the Duke's estates on the Isle of Axholme, Lincolnshire. By 1415 the connection between Monks Kirby and Axholme was already over 350 years old as both belonged to the Anglo-Saxon Leofwin, were given to Geoffrey de la Guerche at the time of the Conquest, and subsequently granted to the Mowbray family. The transfer represented a reversal: since 1077 revenues of Axholme had been paid to the priory of Monks Kirby, but now Monks Kirby revenues would support the new Axholme Abbey.

The church was again altered in the late fifteenth century, and an octagonal spire was added which must have been an imposing local landmark.

The Carthusians in Axholme practised a strict monastic lifestyle and the revenues of the Monks Kirby priory provided most of their income. There were no monks now at Monks Kirby: in 1535 Axholme paid for a vicar at Monks Kirby and for a chantry priest; it is not known for whose soul or souls the chantry priest prayed.

The Newnham Paddox Estate neighbouring Monks Kirby was owned by the Newnham family, under the Mowbrays, from the 12th century. The estate was held by a number of different families in the fourteenth and early fifteenth century until, on 11 November 1433, John Fildyng, or Feilding bought it. Fildyng was a descendent of the earlier owners, the Newnham family. The Feildings expanded their estate by buying part of the Monks Kirby manor (i.e. the lands that belonged to Monks Kirby priory) from the monks at Axholme in 1515.

== The Reformation ==
At the Reformation, King Henry VIII confiscated the assets of the Axholme priory. The King granted the remaining lands of the Monks Kirby Manor to Thomas Manning, Bishop of Ipswich. Meanwhile, the King granted the rectory and the advowson of the vicarage and the income from the collection of local tithes to his foundation of Trinity College, Cambridge.

== Post-Reformation ==
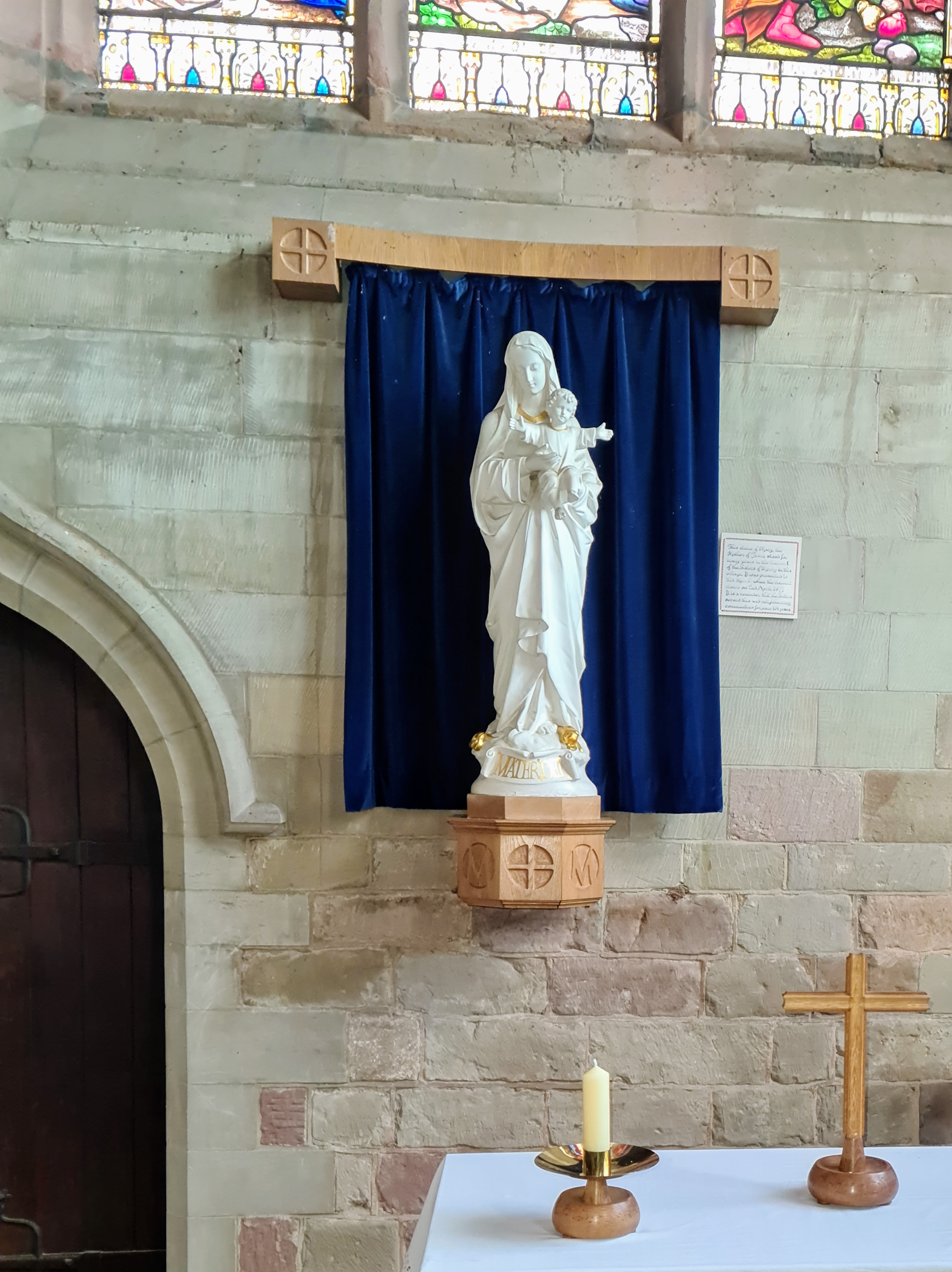
Monks of the priory wrote to the pope in 1360, "Christ has wrought many miracles in honour of His Mother in the church of the said priory." At the time of the 900th anniversary celebrations in 1977, the local community of Roman Catholic nuns presented a statue of the Virgin Mary to the church.

The priory church became the parish church of Monks Kirby. Clear elements of the priory were incorporated into the north wall of the church and one of the two side chapels.

The manor of Monks Kirby did not stay with the nishop of Ipswich. There were several owners over the following 80 years, including the family of Lady Jane Grey whose father, Henry, the first Duke of Suffolk probably paid for the impressive wooden ceiling still in place in the Church. In the 1600s the manor was bought by the powerful Countess of Buckingham who passed it to her grandson Basil Feilding, 2nd Earl of Denbigh (see Monks Kirby). The Feilding family thus came to own both the historic Newnham Paddox estate and the lands that in the medieval period had belonged to the priory church of Monks Kirby. The Earl of Denbigh owned most of the village and the land around it until the mid-twentieth century (see Monks Kirby).

The church spire blew down in 1701. The distinctive parapets were added in the late eighteenth century and the church owes much of its current interior appearance to its most recent major restoration, in 1869. The church's dedication to Saint Edith of Polesworth was almost certainly revived in the eighteenth century (see the article on church dedications), but the presumed medieval or Anglo-Saxon origins of the dedication to St Edith - while generally accepted - are unclear.

Trinity College divested itself of substantial landholdings around Monks Kirby following the Second World War, but retains the benefice and continues to be involved in the church's affairs.

=== Legacy ===
In 1977, the 900th anniversary of the foundation of the priory was celebrated in Monks Kirby. The celebrations included a service at the church to the Church by Benedictine monks. On the 1 July 1977 25 monks and 3 abbbots from four English Benedictine abbeys performed the Office of First Vespers for the Feast of Visitation, "just as the first seven monks and their prior would have done when the church was dedicated on 1 July 1077." In the 19th century, a Roman Catholic religious community had been re-established in Monks Kirby (see Monks Kirby Roman Catholic Community), and the celebrations involved both the Catholic and Anglican community.

As part of the 900 year celebrations, a small archaeological excavation was carried out which found evidence of the twelfth-century church.
