= Strone, Inverness-shire =

Hamlet in the Scottish highlands

Coordinates: 57.325°N 4.4489°W

Strone: Scottish Gaelic: An t-Sròn
- Location within the Inverness area
- OS grid reference: NH526287
- Council area: Highland
- Lieutenancy area: Inverness
- Country: Scotland
- Sovereign state: United Kingdom
- Postcode district: IV63 6XL
- Police: Scotland
- Fire: Scottish
- Ambulance: Scottish
- Scottish Parliament: Inverness, Nairn, Badenoch and Strathspey

Strone (Scottish Gaelic: An t-Sròn, "The Nose") is a small hamlet in the administrative county of the Scottish Highlands and in the historic county of Inverness-shire. It is adjacent to the well-known Urquhart Castle, which is itself located on Strone Point, a headland extending into Loch Ness.

Strone lies on the A82 road, at the foot of Creag na h-Iolaire (Scottish Gaelic: "Eagle Rock") and on the shore of Loch Ness where it meets Glen Urquhart. The nearest village is Drumnadrochit, some 3 kilometres (1.9 mi) to the north along the A82, whilst the city of Inverness is 26 kilometres (16 mi) away.
