= Axholme Charterhouse =

Monastery in Lincolnshire, England

Coordinates: 53.5075°N 0.7861°W

Axholme Charterhouse or Axholme Priory, also Melwood Priory or Low Melwood Priory, North Lincolnshire, is one of the ten medieval Carthusian houses (charterhouses) in England. It was established in 1397/1398 by Thomas Mowbray, Earl of Nottingham and later Duke of Norfolk. The house was centred on a pre-existing chapel on the present Low Melwood Farm, between Owston Ferry and Epworth in the Isle of Axholme, which according to a papal bull of 1398 "was called anciently the Priory of the Wood".

The full name of the monastery was The House of the Visitation of the Blessed Virgin Mary.

The prior, Saint Augustine Webster, was imprisoned in the Tower of London in 1535 for refusing the Oath of Supremacy and later martyred and canonised.

The monastery was suppressed during the Dissolution of the Monasteries in June 1538.

Afterwards the buildings were converted by John Candysshe into a house: parts still survive as do some earthworks. There has been limited excavation.

== Priors of Axholme ==
- John Moreby, elected 1398
- Henry, occurs 1449
- Richard, occurs 1469 and 1472
- Augustine Webster, 1535
- Michael Mekeness, 1535 to 1538

== See also ==
- List of monastic houses in Lincolnshire
- List of monastic houses in England
- Monks Kirby Priory
