= Copston Magna =

Village and civil parish in Warwickshire, England

Coordinates: 52.491788°N 1.334384°W

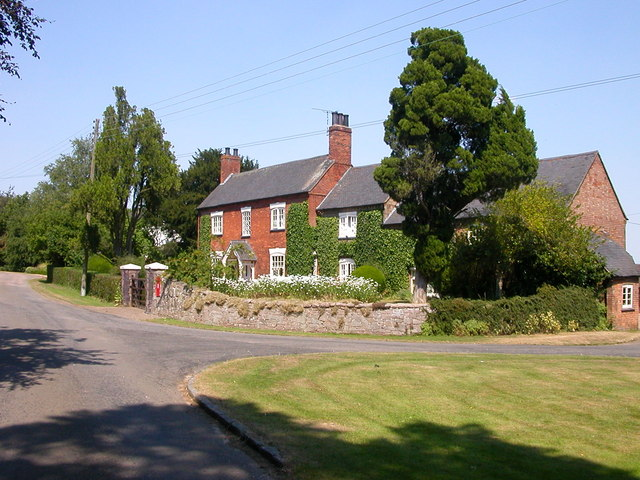
- Copston Magna

- Location within Warwickshire
- Population: 41 (2021)
- OS grid reference: SP4588
- Civil parish: Copston Magna
- District: Rugby
- Shire county: Warwickshire
- Region: West Midlands
- Country: England
- Sovereign state: United Kingdom
- Post town: HINCKLEY
- Postcode district: LE10
- Dialling code: 01455
- Police: Warwickshire
- Fire: Warwickshire
- Ambulance: West Midlands
- UK Parliament: Rugby

Copston Magna is a very small village and civil parish in the Rugby borough of Warwickshire, England. It is located around 9 miles (14 km) northwest of the town of Rugby, 6 miles (9.7 km) southeast of Nuneaton. Though it is only 1.5 miles (2.4 km) east of the larger village of Wolvey, Copston Magna was historically part of the parish of Monks Kirby, 3.5 miles (5.6 km) to the south. Copston is located close to the ancient site of High Cross, on the border between Warwickshire and Leicestershire, where the Roman roads of Watling Street and Fosse Way cross each other. In the 2021 Census, the parish had a population of 41.

Though the village is often referred to just as "Copston" the name Copston Magna distinguishes the settlement from Copston Parva, an abandoned medieval settlement in Wolvey.

Copston first enters the historical record following the Norman Conquest when, in 1077, a priory was established in Monks Kirby. The vill of Copston was part of the endowment given to the new Priory. It is likely that the present Copston church site housed an oratory in the medieval period. Following the Reformation the Earls of Denbigh came to own the land that had belonged to the Priory (see Monks Kirby).

The most notable building in Copston Magna today is the Anglican St John's Church built in 1849. Though it is assumed this replaced a medieval chapel, no trace of the older building survives. The church was built by the sisters of Rudolph Feilding, 8th Earl of Denbigh, who opposed the Earl's conversion to Catholicism. It is a grade II* listed building.
