= Street Ashton =

Hamlet in Warwickshire, England

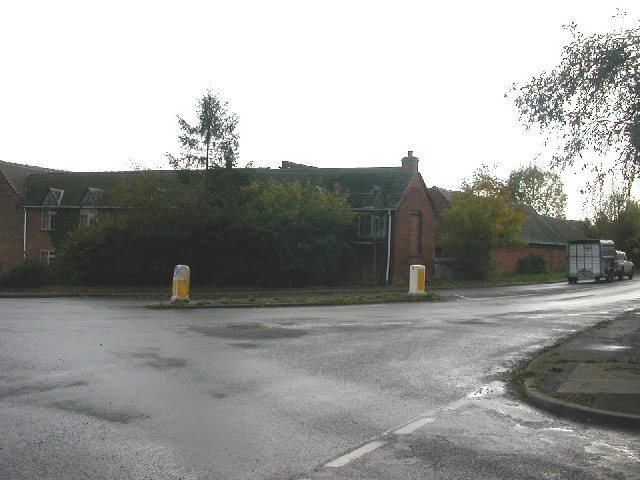
- Street Ashton. Farm buildings at B4112 crossroads with road that runs from Monks Kirby to Stretton Under Fosse.
- Civil parish: Monks Kirby
- Metropolitan borough: Rugby
- Shire county: Warwickshire
- Region: West Midlands
- Country: England
- Sovereign state: United Kingdom
- Post town: Rugby
- Postcode district: CV23
- Dialling code: 01788
- Police: Warwickshire
- Fire: Warwickshire
- Ambulance: West Midlands
- UK Parliament: Rugby

Street Ashton is a hamlet in the Borough of Rugby, Warwickshire, England, part of the parish of Monks Kirby. It is located near the towns of Rugby and Lutterworth. The hamlet is served by buses which connect it to Coventry, Hinckley, Rugby and Hillmorton. The nearest active railway station is Rugby.

== History ==
The hamlet's name is Anglo-Saxon deriving from the personal name "Strudheard" or "Strodo" + "ton" (settlement). "Strudheard's ton" was later rephrased to Street Ashton, almost certainly because of the proximity of the Fosse Way and nearby Stretton-under-Fosse. The principal buildings in the Hamlet are Street Ashton Farm which was historically part of the estate of the Earls of Denbigh, and two large residences, Street Ashton House and Ashton Lodge, now a hotel.

== Street Ashton House ==
Street Ashton House, an imposing, white house sits on a hill above the hamlet and can be seen for several miles around. Formerly a dower house for the Earls of Denbigh, it was the residence (during the Edwardian era) of Major Walter Basil Louis Bonn who was decorated in the First World War and whose father owned the nearby Newbold Revel estate. In the 1950s and 60s Street Ashton House was owned by Spencer Wilks, Chairman of Rover and one of the inventors of the Land Rover. In 2007, Street Ashton House was donated to the Mater Ecclesiae Convent which had been based in Monks Kirby (see Monks Kirby Roman Catholic Community). The convent closed in 2020 and in early 2021 the house was sold by the Roman Catholic Church.
