= Strathwhillan =

Coordinates: 55.574°N 5.135°W

Strathwhillan: Scottish Gaelic: Srath Chuilinn
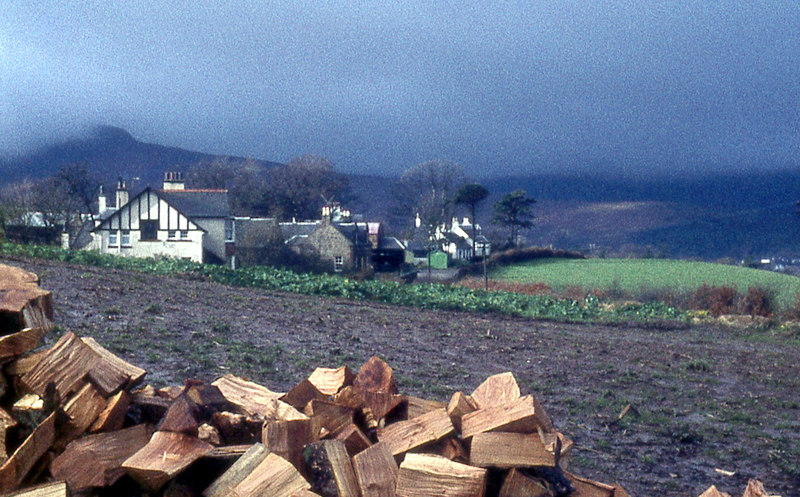
- A row of houses at Strathwhillan, in 1970

- Location within North Ayrshire
- OS grid reference: NS023356
- Civil parish: Kilbride
- Council area: North Ayrshire
- Lieutenancy area: Ayrshire and Arran
- Country: Scotland
- Sovereign state: United Kingdom
- Post town: ISLE OF ARRAN
- Postcode district: KA27
- Dialling code: 01770
- Police: Scotland
- Fire: Scottish
- Ambulance: Scottish
- UK Parliament: North Ayrshire and Arran
- Scottish Parliament: Cunninghame North

Strathwhillan (Scottish Gaelic: Srath Chuilinn) is a tiny community on the Isle of Arran in the Firth of Clyde, Scotland. It is really a suburb of the much larger village of Brodick. There are no amenities to speak of in the area, save for a local guest house.
