= Street, Devon =

Village in Devon, England

Coordinates: 50.695207°N 3.154621°W

Street
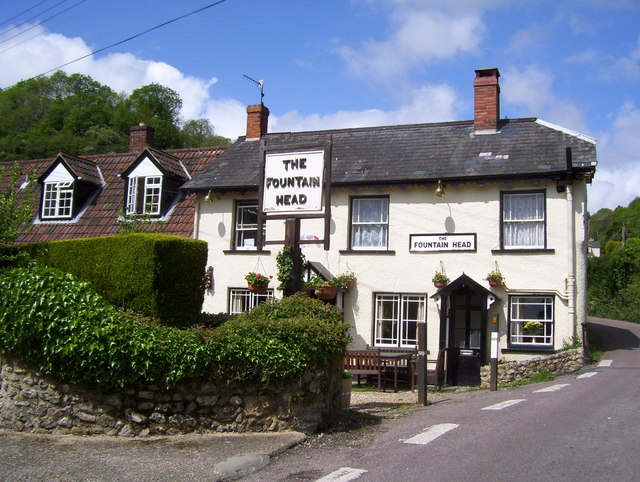

- Location within Devon
- OS grid reference: SY1854689032
- Civil parish: Branscombe
- District: East Devon
- Shire county: Devon
- Region: South West
- Country: England
- Sovereign state: United Kingdom
- Post town: SIDMOUTH
- Postcode district: EX12 3
- Dialling code: 01395
- Police: Devon and Cornwall
- Fire: Devon and Somerset
- Ambulance: South Western
- UK Parliament: Honiton and Sidmouth

Street is a small village in the East Devon district of Devon, England. Its nearest town is Sidmouth, which lies approximately 4 miles (6.4 km) south-west from the village. The village is situated north from the Jurassic Coast World Heritage Site. The village has one pub, named The Fountainhead.
