= Rugby Borough Council elections =

Local government elections in Warwickshire, England

Rugby Borough Council elections are held three years out of every four, with a third of the council elected each time. Rugby Borough Council is the local authority for the non-metropolitan district of Rugby in Warwickshire, England. Since the last boundary changes in 2012, 42 councillors have been elected from 16 wards.

== Results ==
Year	Labour	Conservatives	Liberal Democrats	Others
2026	12	15	12	3
2024	15	17	10	0
2023	12	21	9	0
2022	10	23	9	0
2018	9	24	9	0
2016	9	21	9	3
2011	11	29	8	0
2010	11	28	9	0
2007	11	27	10	0
2006	13	24	10	1
2004	14	21	10	3
2003	16	18	10	4
2002	16	18	10	4
2000	18	14	9	7
1999	22	11	7	8
1998	22	12	5	9

== Council elections ==
- 1973 Rugby Borough Council election
- 1976 Rugby Borough Council election
- 1979 Rugby Borough Council election (New ward boundaries)
- 1980 Rugby Borough Council election
- 1982 Rugby Borough Council election
- 1983 Rugby Borough Council election
- 1984 Rugby Borough Council election
- 1986 Rugby Borough Council election
- 1987 Rugby Borough Council election
- 1988 Rugby Borough Council election (Borough boundary changes took place but the number of seats remained the same)
- 1990 Rugby Borough Council election
- 1991 Rugby Borough Council election
- 1992 Rugby Borough Council election
- 1994 Rugby Borough Council election (Borough boundary changes took place but the number of seats remained the same)
- 1995 Rugby Borough Council election
- 1996 Rugby Borough Council election
- 1998 Rugby Borough Council election
- 1999 Rugby Borough Council election
- 2000 Rugby Borough Council election
- 2002 Rugby Borough Council election (New ward boundaries)
- 2003 Rugby Borough Council election
- 2004 Rugby Borough Council election
- 2006 Rugby Borough Council election
- 2007 Rugby Borough Council election (Some new ward boundaries)
- 2008 Rugby Borough Council election
- 2010 Rugby Borough Council election
- 2011 Rugby Borough Council election
- 2012 Rugby Borough Council election (New ward boundaries)
- 2014 Rugby Borough Council election
- 2015 Rugby Borough Council election (Minor ward boundary changes)
- 2016 Rugby Borough Council election
- 2018 Rugby Borough Council election
- 2019 Rugby Borough Council election
- 2021 Rugby Borough Council election
- 2022 Rugby Borough Council election
- 2023 Rugby Borough Council election
- 2024 Rugby Borough Council election
- 2026 Rugby Borough Council election

== Results maps ==
2002 results map

2003 results map

2004 results map

2006 results map

2007 results map

2008 results map

2010 results map

2011 results map

2012 results map

2014 results map

2015 results map

2016 results map

2018 results map

2019 results map

2021 results map

2022 results map

2023 results map

2024 results map

2026 results map

== By-election results ==
=== 1998–2002 ===
Overslade By-Election 28 September 1999
Party	Candidate	Votes	%	±%
Conservative		419	41.1	+2.8
Labour		387	38.0	−8.5
Liberal Democrats		213	20.9	+5.7
Majority		32	3.1	
Turnout		1,019	22.2	
Conservative gain from Labour		Swing		

Benn By-Election 7 June 2001
Party	Candidate	Votes	%	±%
Labour		1,277	64.0	+0.0
Conservative		387	19.4	−4.1
Liberal Democrats		330	16.5	+3.9
Majority		890	44.6	
Turnout		1,994	57.2	
Labour hold		Swing		

Hillmorton By-Election 7 June 2001
Party	Candidate	Votes	%	±%
Labour		1,050	37.4	+10.1
Liberal Democrats		790	28.1	+7.8
Conservative		620	22.1	+1.4
Independent		350	12.5	−19.1
Majority		260	9.3	
Turnout		2,810	67.2	
Labour gain from Independent		Swing		

Paddox By-Election 7 June 2001
Party	Candidate	Votes	%	±%
Liberal Democrats		1,256	44.7	−11.1
Labour		792	28.2	+13.1
Conservative		760	27.1	−2.0
Majority		464	16.5	
Turnout		2,808	71.7	
Liberal Democrats gain from Labour		Swing		

Lawford By-Election 23 October 2001
Party	Candidate	Votes	%	±%
Labour		260	60.9	−10.3
Independent		167	39.1	+39.1
Majority		93	21.8	
Turnout		427	19.4	
Labour hold		Swing		

=== 2002–2006 ===
Paddox By-Election 12 October 2005
Party	Candidate	Votes	%	±%
Liberal Democrats	Noreen New	471	48.4	−20.5
Conservative	Dave Cranham	344	35.3	+14.3
Labour	Benjamin Ferrett	159	16.3	+6.2
Majority		127	13.1	−34.8
Turnout		974	34	−7.6
Liberal Democrats hold		Swing		

=== 2006–2010 ===
Avon and Swift By-Election 4 December 2008
Party	Candidate	Votes	%	±%
Conservative		361	56.9	−11.9
Liberal Democrats		153	24.1	+9.0
Labour		84	13.2	−2.8
Green		37	5.8	+5.8
Majority		208	32.8	
Turnout		635		
Conservative hold		Swing		

=== 2010–2014 ===
Dunchurch and Knightlow By-Election 2 December 2010
Party	Candidate	Votes	%	±%
Conservative	Ian Lowe	832	49.4	+1.7
Liberal Democrats	Robert Aird	682	40.5	−0.8
Labour	Robert McNally	149	8.9	−0.4
Green	George Hougez	20	1.2	−0.5
Majority		150	8.9	
Turnout		1,683		
Conservative hold		Swing		

New Bilton By-Election 15 November 2012
Party	Candidate	Votes	%	±%
Labour	Steve Birkett	496	49.3	+1.9
Conservative	Katie Ferrier	192	19.1	−8.0
Green	Roy Sandison	100	9.9	−6.2
UKIP	Roy Harvey	82	8.2	+8.2
Independent	Patricia Wyatt	56	5.6	+5.6
Liberal Democrats	David Merritt	41	4.1	+4.1
TUSC	Pete McLaren	39	3.9	−5.5
Majority		304	30.2	
Turnout		1,006		
Labour hold		Swing		

Bilton By-Election 2 May 2013
Party	Candidate	Votes	%	±%
Conservative	Martin Walton	851	41.8	−4.1
UKIP	Roy Harvey	440	21.6	+21.6
Labour	Owen Richards	345	16.9	−9.1
Liberal Democrats	Bill Lewis	308	15.1	−1.0
Green	Peter Reynolds	57	2.8	+2.8
TUSC	Steve Roberts	37	1.8	−10.3
Majority		411	20.2	
Turnout		2,038		
Conservative hold		Swing		

Hillmorton By-Election 21 November 2013
Party	Candidate	Votes	%	±%
Conservative	Jim Buckley	400	33.0	−11.9
Labour	Barbara Brown	339	28.0	−1.8
UKIP	Roy Harvey	231	19.1	+19.1
Liberal Democrats	Tim Douglas	221	18.2	−0.4
Green	Peter Burrows	21	1.7	+1.7
Majority		61	5.0	
Turnout		1,212		
Conservative hold		Swing		

=== 2014–2018 ===
Bilton By-Election 6 November 2014
Party	Candidate	Votes	%	±%
Conservative	Julie A'Barrow	668	42.0	−12.2
UKIP	Gordon Davies	325	20.4	+20.4
Liberal Democrats	Lesley George	280	17.6	+8.1
Labour	John Wells	212	13.3	−8.1
Independent	John Herman	60	3.8	+3.8
Green	Kate Crowley	37	2.3	−7.8
TUSC	Pete McLaren	10	0.6	−4.3
Majority		343	21.5	
Turnout		1,592		
Conservative hold		Swing		

Coton and Boughton By-Election 4 May 2017
Party	Candidate	Votes	%	±%
Conservative	Sebastian Lowe	809	52.2	+5.9
Labour	Alan Webb	533	34.4	+4.4
Liberal Democrats	Jerome Perrier	120	7.7	−0.2
Green	Peter Reynolds	89	5.7	+5.7
Majority		276	17.8	
Turnout		1,551		
Conservative hold		Swing		

New Bilton By-Election 4 May 2017
Party	Candidate	Votes	%	±%
Labour	Mike Brader	784	53.3	+2.1
Conservative	Zoe Feeney	505	34.3	+4.9
Green	Roy Sandison	107	7.3	−1.9
Liberal Democrats	Hossain Tafazzal	76	5.2	+0.1
Majority		279	19.0	
Turnout		1,472		
Labour hold		Swing		

=== 2018–2022 ===
Rokeby and Overslade By-Election 22 August 2019
Party	Candidate	Votes	%	±%
Liberal Democrats	Glenda Allanach	963	56.1	−7.1
Conservative	Deborah Keeling	346	20.2	+1.8
Labour	Beck Hemsley	165	9.6	−8.9
Brexit Party	Richard Hartland	163	9.5	+9.5
Green	Becca Stevenson	79	4.6	+4.6
Majority		617	36.0	
Turnout		1,716		
Liberal Democrats hold		Swing		

Wolvey and Shilton By-Election 24 June 2021
Party	Candidate	Votes	%	±%
Conservative	Becky Maoudis	370	76.6	+1.6
Labour	Richard Harrington	60	12.4	−12.6
Liberal Democrats	Sam Edwards	29	6.0	+6.0
Green	Mark Summers	24	5.0	+5.0
Majority		310	64.2	
Turnout		483		
Conservative hold		Swing		

=== 2022–2026 ===
Dunsmore By-Election 14 December 2023 (2 seats)
Party	Candidate	Votes	%	±%
Liberal Democrats	Jonathan Bennett	613		
Conservative	Jill Simpson-Vince	588		
Conservative	Salome Eric	557		
Liberal Democrats	Trisha Trimble	548		
Labour	Stephen Dyke	299		
Labour	Jenny Offordile	256		
Green	Helen Ford	145		
Green	Mark Summers	89		
Liberal Democrats gain from Conservative		Swing		
Conservative hold		Swing		

New Bilton By-Election 1 May 2025
Party	Candidate	Votes	%	±%
Labour	Angela Thompson	466	34.3	−27.5
Reform	Dan Glover	410	30.2	+30.2
Conservative	J. P. Downes	241	17.7	−5.5
Green	Becca Stevenson	134	9.9	+1.3
Liberal Democrats	Rebecca Moran	107	7.9	+1.5
Majority		56	4.1	
Turnout		1,358		
Labour hold		Swing		
