= 2010 Rugby Borough Council election =

2010 English local government election

Map of the 2010 Rugby Borough Council election

The 2010 Rugby Borough Council election took place on 6 May 2010 to elect a third of the members of Rugby Borough Council, the council of the Borough of Rugby in England. This was on the same day as the other local elections across England as well as the 2010 United Kingdom general election. The previous council election took place in 2008 and the following election was held in 2011. In the election, the council stayed under Conservative control.

== Results ==
Party	Previous	Seats +/-	2008
Conservative	27	▲1	28
Labour	11	Steady	11
Liberal Democrat	10	▼1	9

== See also ==
- Rugby Borough Council elections
