= 2008 Rugby Borough Council election =

2008 English local government election

- 1 May 2008

18 out of 54 seats to Rugby Borough Council 26 seats needed for a majority
	First party	Second party	Third party
Party	Conservative	Labour	Liberal Democrats
Last election	27	11 seats	10 seats
Seats after	28	11	9
Seat change	▲1	Steady	▼1
- Results map
Leader after election
TBD

The 2008 Rugby Borough Council election took place on 1 May 2008 to elect a third of the members of Rugby Borough Council, the council of the Borough of Rugby in England. This was on the same day as the other 2008 United Kingdom local elections. The previous council election took place in 2007 and the following election was held in 2010. In the election, the council stayed under Conservative control. Seven months later the Conservatives held a seat in a by-election in the Avon and Swift ward.

== Results ==
Party	Previous	Seats +/-	2008
Conservative	27	▲1	28
Labour	11	Steady	11
Liberal Democrat	10	▼1	9

== See also ==
- Rugby Borough Council elections
