= 2024 Rugby Borough Council election =

2024 English local election

← 2023	2 May 2024	2026 →

14 out of 42 seats to Rugby Borough Council 22 seats needed for a majority

	First party	Second party	Third party
Leader	Derek Poole	Michael Moran	Jerry Roodhouse
Party	Conservative	Labour	Liberal Democrats
Last election	21 seats, 36.1%	12 seats, 34.8%	9 seats, 21.6%
Seats before	17	15	10
Seats won	6	5	3
Seats after	17	15	10
Seat change	▼4	▲3	▲1
- Map of the results
Leader before election
Derek Poole
Conservative
No overall control
Leader after election
Michael Moran
Labour
No overall control

The 2024 Rugby Borough Council election took place on 2 May 2024 to elect members of Rugby Borough Council in Warwickshire, England. This was on the same day as other local elections.

== Results Summary ==
Prior to the election, the council was under no overall control, being led by a Conservative minority administration. Following the election, the council remained under no overall control, and the Conservatives remained the largest party. There were some weeks of negotiations after the election on who should form the next administration, with the Conservatives trying to form a coalition with Liberal Democrats. In the end, an agreement was reached between Labour and the Liberal Democrats to allow a minority Labour administration to take control of the council with informal support from the Liberal Democrats. The Conservative leader of the council, Derek Poole, was removed from office at a council meeting on 5 June 2024, being replaced by the Labour group leader, Michael Moran.

=== Election result ===
2024 Rugby Borough Council election
Party	This election			Full council			This election		
Party	Seats	Net	Seats %	Other	Total	Total %	Votes	Votes %	+/−
Conservative	6			11	17		8,399	32.0	
Labour	5			10	15		9,499	36.2	
Liberal Democrats	3			7	10		5,437	20.7	
Green	0			0	0		1,799	6.9	
Reform UK	0			0	0		1,073	4.1	

== Ward results ==
The Statement of Persons Nominated, which details the candidates standing in each ward, was released by Rugby Borough Council following the close of nominations on 5 April 2024. Sitting councillors standing for re-election are marked with an asterisk (*).

=== Admirals & Cawston ===
Admirals & Cawston
Party	Candidate	Votes	%	±%
Labour	Amanda Henderson	1,067	47.6	+2.3
Conservative	Carolyn Watson-Merret*	592	26.4	−15.1
Reform UK	Alan James	250	11.1	N/A
Liberal Democrats	Lee Chase	205	9.1	+1.2
Green	Jennifer Farley	129	5.8	+0.5
Majority		475	21.2	
Turnout		2,243	32.81	
Labour gain from Conservative		Swing		

=== Benn ===
Benn
Party	Candidate	Votes	%	±%
Labour	Maggie O'Rourke*	1,039	64.7	+1.9
Conservative	Heidi Thomas	261	16.3	−2.9
Green	Becca Stevenson	186	11.6	+1.2
Liberal Democrats	Rebecca Moran	120	7.5	−0.1
Majority		778	48.4	
Turnout		1,606	26.08	
Labour hold		Swing		

=== Bilton ===
Bilton
Party	Candidate	Votes	%	±%
Conservative	Michael Howling	823	38.2	+1.9
Liberal Democrats	Stephen Pimm	689	31.9	−0.9
Labour	Colin Mander	528	24.5	−1.1
Green	Lesley Summers	117	5.4	+0.1
Majority		134		
Turnout		2,157	43.01	
Conservative hold		Swing		

=== Clifton, Newton & Churchover ===
Clifton, Newton & Churchover
Party	Candidate	Votes	%	±%
Conservative	Eve Hassell*	362	44.6	−13.7
Labour	Stephen Dyke	336	41.4	+16.3
Green	Alexander Linden	113	13.9	+5.3
Majority		26	3.2	
Turnout		811	33.73	
Conservative hold		Swing		

=== Coton & Boughton ===
Coton & Boughton
Party	Candidate	Votes	%	±%
Labour	Claire Edwards	951	48.3	+3.2
Conservative	Dapo Awotunde	619	31.5	−8.8
Reform UK	Jamie Pullin	169	8.6	+5.4
Liberal Democrats	Edward Blackburn	123	6.3	±0.0
Green	Christopher Mawby	106	5.4	+0.3
Majority		332	16.8	
Turnout		1,968	33.68	
Labour gain from Conservative		Swing		

=== Dunsmore ===
Dunsmore
Party	Candidate	Votes	%	±%
Conservative	Jill Simpson-Vince*	944	38.5	−6.3
Liberal Democrats	Claire Sandison	924	37.7	+17.4
Labour	Ann Coomber	416	17.0	−9.2
Green	Helen Ford	169	6.9	−1.8
Majority		20	0.8	
Turnout		2,453	35.05	
Conservative hold		Swing		

=== Eastlands ===
Eastlands
Party	Candidate	Votes	%	±%
Liberal Democrats	Tricia Trimble	695	36.3	−13.0
Labour	Ade Adewumi	584	30.5	+5.1
Conservative	Joel Baldwin	369	19.2	+0.1
Reform UK	Lesley Pond	145	7.6	N/A
Green	Mawgan Stinchcombe	124	6.5	+0.3
Majority		111	5.8	
Turnout		1,917	33.47	
Liberal Democrats hold		Swing		

=== Hillmorton ===
Hillmorton
Party	Candidate	Votes	%	±%
Conservative	Adam Daly*	945	43.8	−0.6
Labour	Jenny Offordile	903	41.8	−0.5
Liberal Democrats	Julie Douglas	206	9.5	+1.3
Green	Dariusz Kowalczuk	104	4.8	−0.3
Majority		42	2.0	
Turnout		2,158	32.14	
Conservative hold		Swing		

=== New Bilton ===
New Bilton
Party	Candidate	Votes	%	±%
Labour	Ish Mistry*	766	61.8	+2.4
Conservative	Karolina Lipowska	288	23.2	−1.5
Green	Roy Sandison	106	8.6	+1.6
Liberal Democrats	Hossain Tafazzal	79	6.4	−2.6
Majority		478	38.6	
Turnout		1,239	23.60	
Labour hold		Swing		

=== Newbold & Brownsover ===
Newbold & Brownsover
Party	Candidate	Votes	%	±%
Labour	Tony Freeman	778	47.9	−3.4
Conservative	Wayne Rabin*	491	30.2	−2.7
Reform UK	Devenne Kedward	159	9.8	N/A
Green	Mark Summers	120	7.4	−1.3
Liberal Democrats	Hugh Trimble	77	4.7	−2.4
Majority		287	17.7	
Turnout		1,625	25.96	
Labour gain from Conservative		Swing		

=== Paddox ===
Paddox
Party	Candidate	Votes	%	±%
Liberal Democrats	Mark Thomas	962	46.5	−12.6
Labour	Simon Burne	539	26.0	+8.1
Conservative	Louise Adkins	325	15.7	−2.1
Reform UK	Francis Holden	150	7.2	N/A
Green	Bob Beggs	94	4.5	−0.8
Majority		423	20.5	
Turnout		2,070	37.67	
Liberal Democrats hold		Swing		

=== Revel & Binley Woods ===
Revel & Binley Woods
Party	Candidate	Votes	%	±%
Conservative	Tony Gillias*	1,141	61.4	±0.0
Labour	Robert Bevin	538	28.9	+1.5
Green	Maz Pickup	109	5.9	−0.6
Liberal Democrats	James Moran	71	3.8	−0.9
Majority		603	32.5	
Turnout		1,859	36.73	
Conservative hold		Swing		

=== Rokeby & Overslade ===
Rokeby & Overslade
Party	Candidate	Votes	%	±%
Liberal Democrats	Carie-Anne Dumbleton*	1,212	59.8	+2.2
Conservative	Aniket Kulkarni	371	18.3	−1.1
Labour	Christopher Lee	334	16.5	−0.9
Green	Kate Crowley	111	5.5	−0.1
Majority		841	41.5	
Turnout		2,028	35.59	
Liberal Democrats hold		Swing		

=== Wolston & The Lawfords ===
Wolston & The Lawfords
Party	Candidate	Votes	%	±%
Conservative	Tim Willis*	808	40.5	−7.1
Labour	Adam Holst	720	36.1	+3.6
Reform UK	John Birch	200	10.0	+5.1
Green	Phil Hemsley	191	9.6	−1.0
Liberal Democrats	Victoria Saxby-Edwards	74	3.7	−0.8
Majority		88	4.4	
Turnout		1,993	33.51	
Conservative hold		Swing		

== By-elections ==
=== New Bilton ===
New Bilton by-election: 1 May 2025
Party	Candidate	Votes	%	±%
Labour	Angela Thompson	466	34.3	–27.5
Reform UK	Dan Glover	410	30.2	N/A
Conservative	JP Downes	241	17.7	–5.5
Green	Becca Stevenson	134	9.9	+1.3
Liberal Democrats	Rebecca Moran	107	7.9	+1.5
Majority		56	4.1	–34.5
Turnout		1,358	25.6	+2.0
Labour hold				
