= 2023 Rugby Borough Council election =

2023 English local election

← 2022	4 May 2023	2024 →

14 out of 42 seats to Rugby Borough Council 22 seats needed for a majority

	First party	Second party	Third party
Leader	Seb Lowe	Maggie O'Rourke	Jerry Roodhouse
Party	Conservative	Labour	Liberal Democrats
Last election	23 seats, 37.9%	10 seats, 34.0%	9 seats, 22.2%
Seats won	6	5	3
Seats after	21	12	9
Seat change	▼2	▲2	Steady
Popular vote	9,260	8,916	5,552
Percentage	36.1%	34.8%	21.6%
Swing	▼1.8%	▲0.8%	▼0.6%
- Winner of each seat at the 2023 Rugby Borough Council election
Leader before election
Seb Lowe
Conservative
Leader after election
Derek Poole
Conservative
No overall control

The 2023 Rugby Borough Council election took place on 4 May 2023 to elect 14 members (one-third) of Rugby Borough Council in Warwickshire, England. This was on the same day as other local elections across England.

== Results summary ==
The council was under Conservative majority control prior to the election. Following the results, the Conservatives remained the largest party, but lost their majority, leaving the council under no overall control. One of the Conservatives to lose his seat was the leader of the council, Seb Lowe. The Conservatives managed to form a minority administration after the election, and appointed Derek Poole as their new leader. He was confirmed as the new leader of the council at the subsequent annual council meeting on 18 May 2023. The Labour group also changed their leader after the election; former leader Maggie O'Rourke was appointed mayor, and Michael Moran became the new Labour leader.

2023 Rugby Borough Council election
Party	This election			Full council			This election		
Party	Seats	Net	Seats %	Other	Total	Total %	Votes	Votes %	+/−
Conservative	6	▼2	42.9	15	21	50.0	9,260	36.1	–1.8
Labour	5	▲2	35.7	7	12	28.6	8,916	34.8	+0.8
Liberal Democrats	3	Steady	21.4	6	9	21.4	5,552	21.6	–0.6
Green	0	Steady	0.0	0	0	0.0	1,768	6.9	+1.1
Reform UK	0	Steady	0.0	0	0	0.0	156	0.6	N/A

== Ward results ==
The results for each ward were as follows:

=== Admirals & Cawston ===
Admirals & Cawston
Party	Candidate	Votes	%	±%
Labour	Verity Robinson	1,067	45.3	–6.2
Conservative	Dean Richards	977	41.5	+7.2
Liberal Democrats	Lee Chase	186	7.9	–0.7
Green	Jenny Farley	124	5.3	–0.3
Majority		90	3.8	–13.4
Turnout		2,354	34.0	–0.9
Labour gain from Conservative		Swing	▼6.7	

=== Benn ===
Benn
Party	Candidate	Votes	%	±%
Labour	Rob Barnett	914	62.8	±0.0
Conservative	Dapo Awotunde	280	19.2	–1.2
Green	Angie Dunne	151	10.4	–6.3
Liberal Democrats	Trisha Trimble	111	7.6	N/A
Majority		634	43.6	+1.2
Turnout		1,456	24.8	–1.5
Labour hold		Swing	▲0.6	

=== Bilton ===
Bilton
Party	Candidate	Votes	%	±%
Conservative	Lisa Parker	787	36.3	–5.2
Liberal Democrats	Stephen Pimm	712	32.8	+1.1
Labour	Colin Mander	555	25.6	+5.2
Green	Benjamin Gladwin	115	5.3	–1.1
Majority		75	3.5	–6.3
Turnout		2,169	43.0	+0.4
Conservative hold		Swing	▼3.2	

=== Coton & Boughton ===
Coton & Boughton
Party	Candidate	Votes	%	±%
Labour	Senthil Periasamy	909	45.1	+3.1
Conservative	Seb Lowe	813	40.3	–0.2
Liberal Democrats	Edward Blackburn	127	6.3	–2.3
Green	Roy Sandison	103	5.1	–2.0
Reform UK	Jamie Pullin	64	3.2	N/A
Majority		96	4.8	+3.3
Turnout		2,016	35.3	+2.8
Labour gain from Conservative		Swing	▲1.7	

=== Dunsmore ===
Dunsmore
Party	Candidate	Votes	%	±%
Conservative	John Keeling	1,089	44.8	–4.8
Labour	Ann Coomber	638	26.2	+8.0
Liberal Democrats	Jonathan Bennett	494	20.3	–12.0
Green	Helen Ford	212	8.7	N/A
Majority		451	18.6	+1.2
Turnout		2,433	35.9	–2.0
Conservative hold		Swing	▼6.4	

=== Eastlands ===
Eastlands
Party	Candidate	Votes	%	±%
Liberal Democrats	Neil Sandison	894	49.3	–0.1
Labour	George Bates	461	25.4	+2.0
Conservative	Heidi Thomas	347	19.1	–1.4
Green	Mark Patrick	113	6.2	–0.5
Majority		433	23.9	–2.1
Turnout		1,815	31.9	–3.8
Liberal Democrats hold		Swing	▼1.0	

=== Hillmorton ===
Hillmorton
Party	Candidate	Votes	%	±%
Conservative	Luke Russell	909	44.4	–1.2
Labour	Jenny Offordile	866	42.3	+3.0
Liberal Democrats	Julie Douglas	168	8.2	–6.9
Green	Becca Stevenson	105	5.1	N/A
Majority		43	2.1	–4.2
Turnout		2,048	32.9	–1.3
Conservative hold		Swing	▼2.1	

=== Leam Valley ===
Leam Valley
Party	Candidate	Votes	%	±%
Conservative	Dale Keeling	477	57.5	–23.7
Labour	Mark Gore	171	20.6	+1.8
Liberal Democrats	Victoria Saxby-Edwards	94	11.3	N/A
Green	Chris Mawby	88	10.6	N/A
Majority		306	36.9	–25.5
Turnout		830	42.2	
Conservative hold		Swing	▼12.8	

=== New Bilton ===
New Bilton
Party	Candidate	Votes	%	±%
Labour	Barbara Brown	717	59.4	+0.5
Conservative	Christopher Johnson	298	24.7	–3.0
Liberal Democrats	Claire Sandison	109	9.0	N/A
Green	Maralyn Pickup	84	7.0	–6.4
Majority		419	34.7	+3.5
Turnout		1,208	22.8	–2.9
Labour hold		Swing	▲1.8	

=== Newbold & Brownsover ===
Newbold & Brownsover
Party	Candidate	Votes	%	±%
Labour	Nooria Sayani	777	51.3	–3.8
Conservative	Ginny Gould	498	32.9	+0.9
Green	Mark Summers	132	8.7	–3.7
Liberal Democrats	Hugh Trimble	108	7.1	N/A
Majority		279	18.4	–4.2
Turnout		1,515	24.7	–1.8
Labour hold		Swing	▼2.4	

=== Paddox ===
Paddox
Party	Candidate	Votes	%	±%
Liberal Democrats	Jerry Roodhouse	1,197	59.1	+3.0
Labour	Chris Mawby	363	17.9	+0.1
Conservative	Bella Leathley	360	17.8	–3.0
Green	Bob Beggs	107	5.3	+0.1
Majority		834	41.2	+5.9
Turnout		2,027	37.0	–1.5
Liberal Democrats hold		Swing	▲1.5	

=== Revel & Binley Woods ===
Revel & Binley Woods
Party	Candidate	Votes	%	±%
Conservative	Heather Timms	1,126	61.4	–2.7
Labour	Sarah Feeney	502	27.4	–8.5
Green	Stephen Ward	119	6.5	N/A
Liberal Democrats	James Moran	87	4.7	N/A
Majority		624	34.0	+5.6
Turnout		1,834	36.0	–1.8
Conservative hold		Swing	▲2.9	

=== Rokeby & Overslade ===
Rokeby & Overslade
Party	Candidate	Votes	%	±%
Liberal Democrats	Isabelle McKenzie	1,180	57.6	–8.1
Conservative	Louise Adkins	397	19.4	±0.0
Labour	Chris Lee	356	17.4	+2.5
Green	Kate Crowley	115	5.6	N/A
Majority		783	38.2	–8.1
Turnout		2,048	35.4	–1.9
Liberal Democrats hold		Swing	▼4.1	

=== Wolston & The Lawfords ===
Wolston & The Lawfords
Party	Candidate	Votes	%	±%
Conservative	Derek Poole	902	47.6	–6.3
Labour	Kieren Brown	616	32.5	+3.6
Green	Lesley Summers	200	10.6	–1.7
Reform UK	John Birch	92	4.9	N/A
Liberal Democrats	Hossain Tafazzal	85	4.5	–0.3
Majority		286	15.1	–9.9
Turnout		1,895	31.6	–1.7
Conservative hold		Swing	▼5.0	

== Changes 2023–2024 ==
Dunsmore by-election, 14 December 2023 (2 seats)
Party	Candidate	Votes	%	±%
Liberal Democrats	Jonathan Carl Bennett	613	37.5	+17.2
Conservative	Jill Beverley Simpson-Vince	588	36.0	−8.8
Conservative	Salome Hlupi Eric	557	34.1	−10.7
Liberal Democrats	Trisha Trimble	548	33.5	+13.2
Labour	Stephen Dyke	299	18.3	−7.9
Labour	Jenny Offordile	256	15.7	−10.5
Green	Helen Rebecca Ford	145	8.9	+0.2
Green	Mark Andrew Summers	89	5.4	−3.3
Turnout		1,634	23.7	
Liberal Democrats gain from Conservative				
Conservative hold				

The double by-election in Dunsmore ward was triggered by the resignations of Conservative councillors Howard Roberts and Deepah Roberts.
