= 2011 Rugby Borough Council election =

2011 UK local government election

Results of the 2011 Rugby Borough Council election

The 2011 Rugby Borough Council election for the Rugby Borough Council took place on Thursday 5 May 2011.

There were 16 seats up for election, one third of the council. The election produced a majority for the Conservative Party.

== Election result ==
Rugby Borough Council Election, 2011
Party	Seats	Gains	Losses	Net gain/loss	Seats %	Votes %	Votes	+/−
Conservative	9	1	0	+1	56.2	46.0	12,889	
Labour	4	0	0	±0	25.0	29.6	8,296	
Liberal Democrats	3	0	1	-1	18.8	16.1	4,522	
Green	0	0	0	±0	0.0	5.6	1,556	
TUSC	0	0	0	±0	0.0	2.7	758	

== Ward results ==
Admirals Ward
Party	Candidate	Votes	%	±%
Conservative	Mark Williams	1,068		
Labour	Steve Birkett	811		
Liberal Democrats	Tom Hardgrave	166		
Green	Steve Laffy	139		
Majority		257		
Turnout		2184	41.4%	
Conservative hold		Swing		

Benn Ward
Party	Candidate	Votes	%	±%
Labour	Brian Whistance	858		
Conservative	Chris Pacey-Day	503		
Green	Paul David Sandison	248		
Majority		355		
Turnout		1,599	35.5%	
Labour hold		Swing		

Bilton Ward
Party	Candidate	Votes	%	±%
Conservative	David Alan Wright	1,230		
Labour	Marie Angela McNally	521		
Liberal Democrats	Lesley Mary George	330		
TUSC	Stephen James Robertson	122		
Majority		709		
Turnout		2,203	53.7%	
Conservative hold		Swing		

Brownsover North Ward
Party	Candidate	Votes	%	±%
Conservative	Carolyn Ann Robbins	998		
Labour	John Francis Wells	471		
Liberal Democrats	Dianna Hardgrave	168		
Green	Peter Stephen Reynolds	144		
Majority		527		
Turnout		1,781	37.7%	
Conservative hold		Swing		

Brownsover South Ward
Party	Candidate	Votes	%	±%
Labour	Claire Edwards	490		
Conservative	Belinda Garcia	397		
TUSC	Clive Dunkley	122		
Majority		93		
Turnout		1,009	31.8%	
Labour hold		Swing		

Caldecott Ward
Party	Candidate	Votes	%	±%
Liberal Democrats	Sue Roodhouse	971		
Conservative	Deepah Brojomohun	576		
Labour	Maria Arungwa	341		
TUSC	Julie Dawn Weekes	85		
Majority		395		
Turnout		1,973	47.8%	
Liberal Democrats hold		Swing		

Dunchurch & Knightlow Ward
Party	Candidate	Votes	%	±%
Conservative	Graham Lawrence Francis	1,614		
Liberal Democrats	Chris Holman	560		
Labour	Steve Weston	404		
TUSC	Pete McLaren	88		
Majority		1,054		
Turnout		2,666	54.8%	
Conservative gain from Liberal Democrats		Swing		

Earl Craven & Wolston Ward
Party	Candidate	Votes	%	±%
Conservative	Derek Poole	1,448		
Labour	John Anthony Slinger	513		
Green	Ellie Roderick	171		
Majority		935		
Turnout		2,132	45.7%	
Conservative hold		Swing		

Eastlands Ward
Party	Candidate	Votes	%	±%
Liberal Democrats	Neil Sandison	1,057		
Labour	Owen Keir Richards	506		
Conservative	Paul Michael Samuel Newsome	495		
TUSC	Bert Harris	67		
Majority		551		
Turnout		2,125	46.9%	
Liberal Democrats hold		Swing		

Hillmorton Ward
Party	Candidate	Votes	%	±%
Conservative	Nigel David Allen	940		
Labour	Nigel Edward Stanley	614		
Liberal Democrats	Dave Elson	329		
TUSC	David John Goodwin	117		
Majority		326		
Turnout		2,000	47.4%	
Conservative hold		Swing		

Leam Valley Ward
Party	Candidate	Votes	%	±%
Conservative	Robin Hazelton	812		
TUSC	Geoffrey Dewhurst	157		
Majority		655		
Turnout		969	56.2%	
Conservative hold		Swing		

New Bilton Ward
Party	Candidate	Votes	%	±%
Labour	Don Williams	970		
Conservative	Edward Herbert Joce Palusinski	587		
Green	Roy Leonard Sandison	171		
Liberal Democrats	Jess Upstone	170		
Majority		383		
Turnout		1,898	35.4%	
Labour hold		Swing		

Newbold Ward
Party	Candidate	Votes	%	±%
Labour	Ram Srivastava	876		
Conservative	Teri Watts	546		
Green	Lorna Beryl Joyce Dunleavy	272		
Majority		330		
Turnout		1,694	36.3%	
Labour hold		Swing		

Overslade Ward
Party	Candidate	Votes	%	±%
Conservative	Kam Kaur	884		
Labour	Howard Mark Avis	677		
Green	Laurence Stephen Goodchild	178		
Liberal Democrats	Beatrice Josephine O'Dwyer	159		
Majority		207		
Turnout		1,898	43.9%	
Conservative hold		Swing		

Paddox Ward
Party	Candidate	Votes	%	±%
Liberal Democrats	Noreen New	612		
Conservative	Stephen Anthony Tompsett	348		
Labour	Rob McNally	244		
Green	Phil Godden	83		
Majority		264		
Turnout		1,287	46.0%	
Liberal Democrats hold		Swing		

Ryton-on-Dunsmore Ward
Party	Candidate	Votes	%	±%
Conservative	Ian Spiers	443		
Green	Sarah Catherine Bennett	150		
Majority		293		
Turnout		593	42.9%	
Conservative hold		Swing		
