= South Warwickshire (district) =

- Future unitary authority area
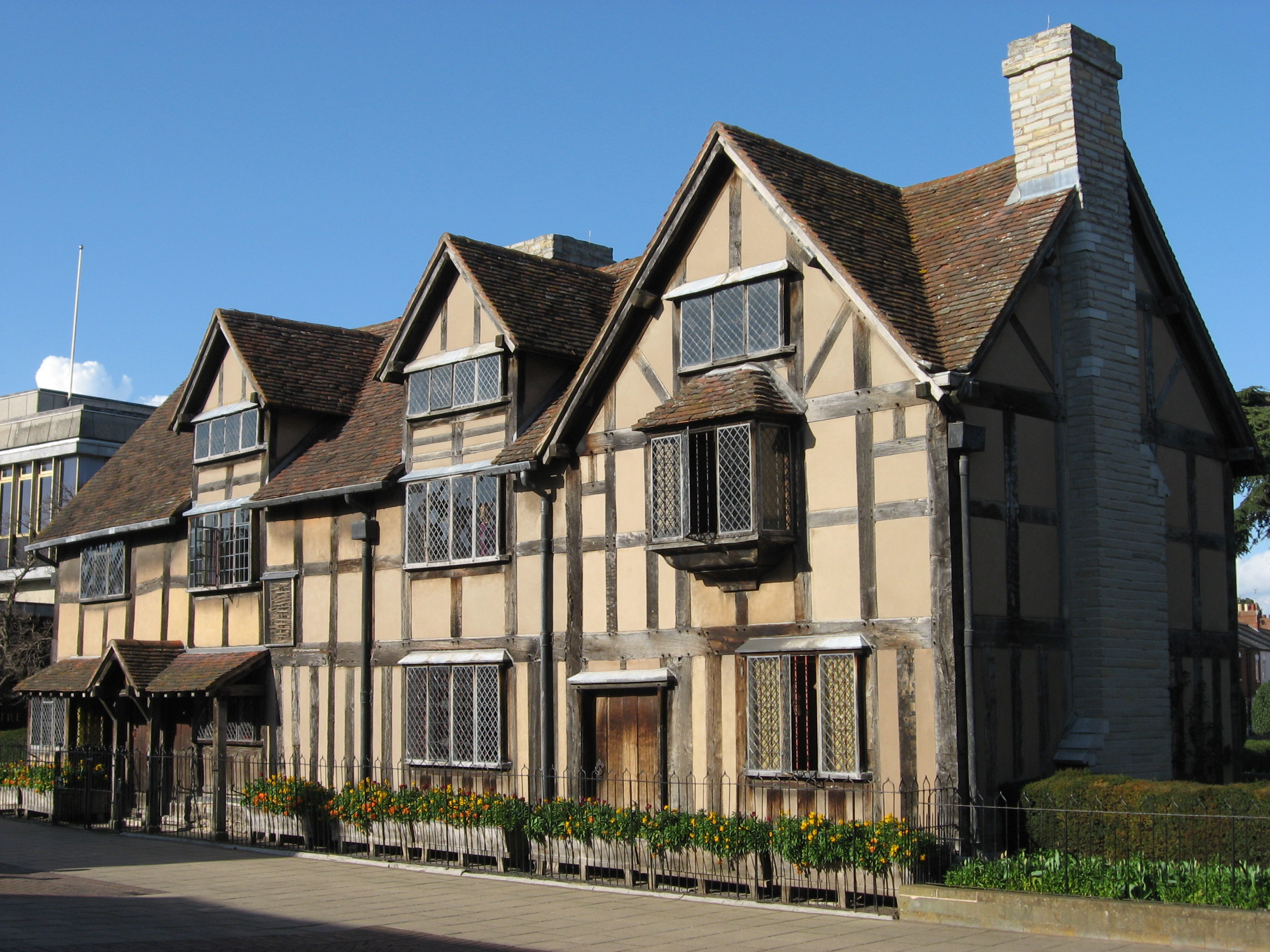
- Shakespeare's birthplace

- Coordinates: 52.2834°N 1.5892°W
- Sovereign state: United Kingdom
- Country: England
- Region: West Midlands
- Ceremonial county: Warwickshire

Government
  - Type: Unitary authority
  - Body: South Warwickshire Council
  - MPs: Manuela Perteghella (LD); Jeremy Wright (C); Matt Western (L)

Area
  - Total: 486.8 sq mi (1,260.8 km^{2})

Population (2024 estimate)
  - Total: 295,000
- Time zone: UTC+0 (GMT)
  - Summer (DST): UTC+1 (BST)

South Warwickshire is expected be a unitary authority area in the ceremonial county of Warwickshire, England. It was planned to be formed on 1 April 2028, with elections to the new authority planned to take place in May 2027. Plans to create it were halted in September 2026 and the 2027 election was cancelled. In October 2026, it was announced that the first election is expected to take place in 2028 and the unitary authority will be established in 2029.

== Formation ==
It will be formed as part of the ongoing local government reforms from the existing Warwickshire districts of Stratford-on-Avon and Warwick, with the three northern Warwickshire districts going to form a North Warwickshire unitary authority.

The proposal for two unitary councils was supported by all the district councils in Warwickshire apart from Rugby Borough Council. The alternative proposal for a single unitary, which was backed by Rugby Borough Council and Warwickshire County Council, was not accepted.

Decisions were announced in July 2026, with elections planned for May 2027 and the new authorities established in 2028. In September 2026, the Warwickshire proposals were halted by the new government and placed under review. In October 2026, the plans were revived with the first election expected to take place in 2028 and the unitary authority established in 2029, subject to a three week consultation period. Warwickshire is one of only three areas where the proposals were not met with threat of judicial review.

== Governance ==
The area will be run by South Warwickshire Council, which will comprise 56 councillors.

== Geography ==
Its largest settlement will be Royal Leamington Spa and it will also include the towns of Warwick, Stratford-upon-Avon, Kenilworth, Whitnash, Southam, Alcester, Shipston-on-Stour and Henley-in-Arden, as well as the large villages of Bidford-on-Avon, Studley and Wellesbourne. The area has a 2024 estimated population of 295,000.

== Parishes ==
The district will be divided into 145 civil parishes. The parishes are:

- Admington, Alcester, Alderminster, Arrow with Weethley, Ashow, Aston Cantlow, Atherstone-on-Stour, Avon Dassett
- Baddesley Clinton, Baginton, Barcheston, Barford, Barton-on-the-Heath, Bearley, Beaudesert, Beausale, Haseley, Honiley and Wroxall, Bidford-on-Avon, Billesley, Binton, Bishops Itchington, Bishops Tachbrook, Blackdown, Brailes, Bubbenhall, Budbrooke, Burmington, Burton Dassett, Burton Green, Bushwood, Butlers Marston
- Chadshunt, Chapel Ascote, Charlecote, Cherington, Chesterton and Kingston, Claverdon, Clifford Chambers and Milcote, Combrook, Compton Verney, Compton Wynyates, Coughton, Cubbington
- Dorsington
- Eathorpe, Ettington, Exhall
- Farnborough, Fenny Compton, Fulbrook
- Gaydon, Great Alne, Great Wolford
- Halford, Hampton Lucy, Harbury, Haselor, Hatton, Henley-in-Arden, Hodnell and Wills Pastures, Honington, Hunningham
- Idlicote, Ilmington
- Kenilworth, Kineton, Kinwarton
- Ladbroke, Langley, Lapworth, Leek Wootton and Guy's Cliffe, Lighthorne, Lighthorne Heath, Little Compton, Little Wolford, Long Compton, Long Itchington, Long Marston, Loxley, Luddington
- Milcote, Moreton Morrell, Morton Bagot
- Napton-on-the-Hill, Newbold Pacey, Northend, Norton Lindsey
- Offchurch, Old Milverton, Oldberrow, Oversley Green, Oxhill
- Pillerton Hersey, Pillerton Priors, Preston Bagot, Preston-on-Stour, Priors Hardwick, Priors Marston
- Quinton
- Radbourne, Radford Semele, Radway, Ratley and Upton, Rowington, Royal Leamington Spa
- Salford Priors, Sambourne, Sherbourne, Shipston-on-Stour, Shotteswell, Shrewley, Snitterfield, Southam, Spernall, Stockton, Stoneleigh, Stoneton, Stourton, Stratford-upon-Avon, Stretton-on-Fosse, Studley, Sutton-under-Brailes
- Tanworth-in-Arden, Temple Grafton, Tidmington, Tredington, Tysoe
- Ufton, Ullenhall, Upper and Lower Shuckburgh
- Wappenbury, Warmington, Watergall, Warwick, Wasperton, Welford-on-Avon, Wellesbourne, Weston-on-Avon, Weston Under Wetherley, Whatcote, Whichford, Whitchurch, Whitnash, Willington, Wilmcote, Wixford, Wolverton, Wootton Wawen, Wormleighton
