= Sutton-under-Brailes =

Village in Warwickshire, England

Coordinates: 52.034007°N 1.5643635°W

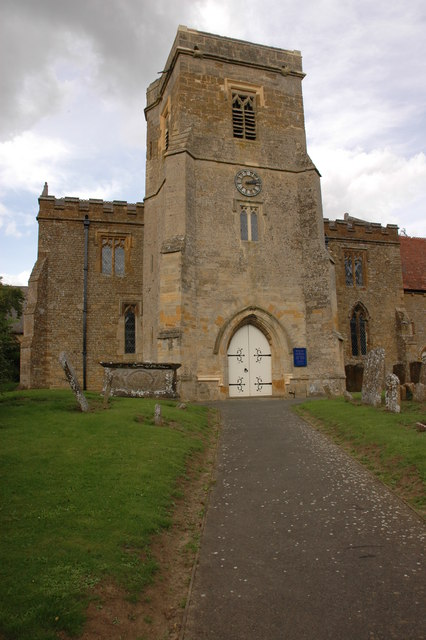
- Church of St Thomas a Becket

- Location within Warwickshire
- Area: 4.48 km^{2} (1.73 sq mi)
- Population: 89 (2001 census)
  - Density: 20/km^{2} (52/sq mi)
- Civil parish: Sutton-under-Brailes
- District: Stratford-on-Avon
- Shire county: Warwickshire
- Region: West Midlands
- Country: England
- Sovereign state: United Kingdom
- Police: Warwickshire
- Fire: Warwickshire
- Ambulance: West Midlands

Sutton-under-Brailes is a village and civil parish 17 miles (27 km) south of Warwick, in the Stratford-on-Avon district of Warwickshire, England. Adjacent parishes are Barcheston, Brailes, Cherington, Stourton and Whichford. In 2001 the parish had a population of 89.

== History ==
The name "Sutton" means 'South farm/settlement', the "Brailes" part referring to being 2 miles south of Brailes. Sutton-under-Brailes was recorded in the Domesday Book as Sudtune. Sutton under Brailes was formerly a detached parish of Gloucestershire, in the 1840s it was transferred to Warwickshire.

== Landmarks ==
There are 17 listed buildings in Sutton-under-Brailes. The parish church is dedicated to St Thomas a Becket.

== Source ==
- "Sutton-under-Brailes". City Population De.
