= Pillerton Hersey =

Village and civil parish in Warwickshire, England

Coordinates: 52.136°N 1.562°W

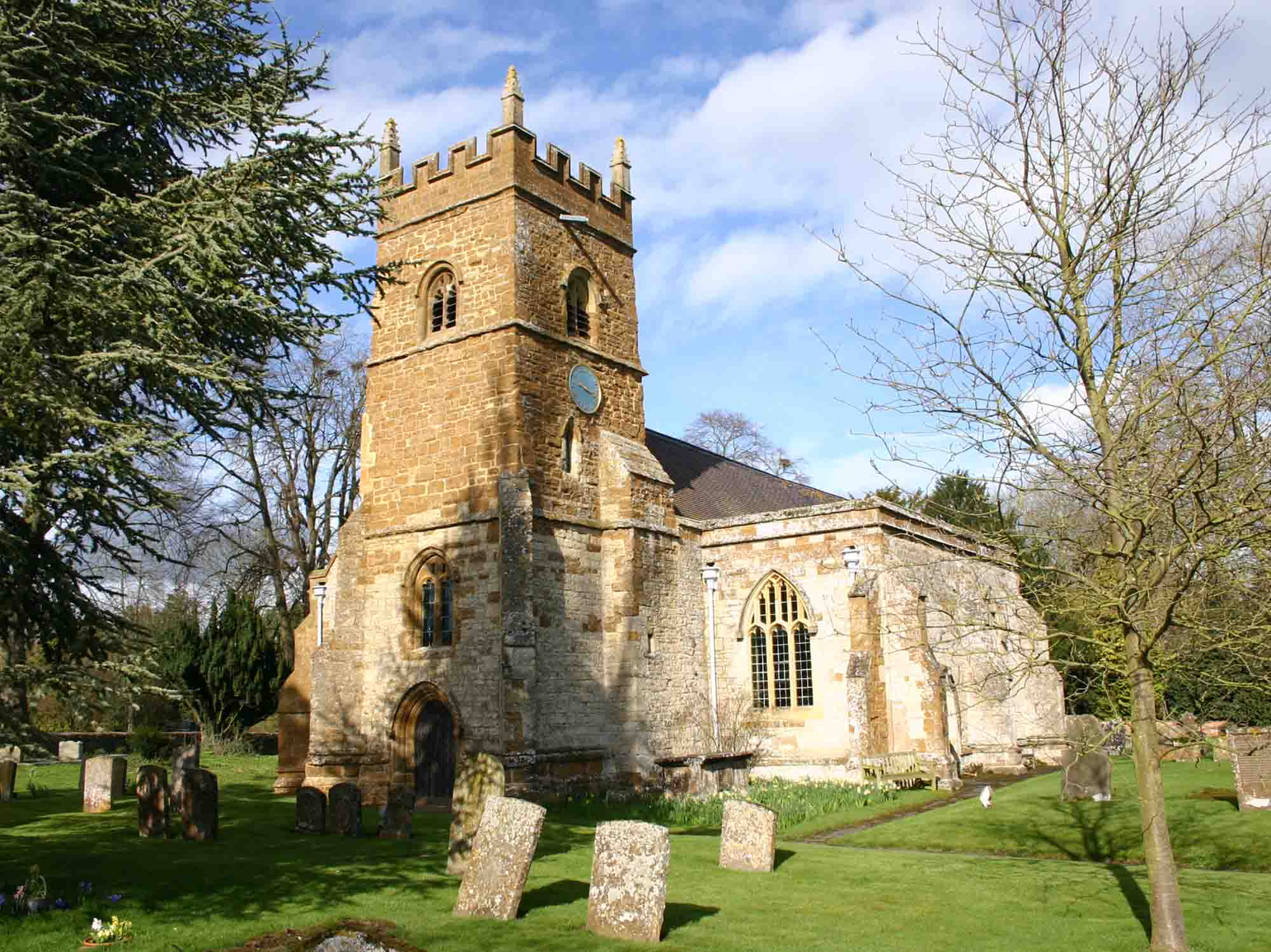
- St Mary the Virgin parish church

- Location within Warwickshire
- Population: 170 (2011 Census)
- OS grid reference: SP2948
- Civil parish: Pillerton Hersey
- District: Stratford-on-Avon
- Shire county: Warwickshire
- Region: West Midlands
- Country: England
- Sovereign state: United Kingdom
- Post town: Warwick
- Postcode district: CV35
- Dialling code: 01789
- Police: Warwickshire
- Fire: Warwickshire
- Ambulance: West Midlands
- UK Parliament: Stratford-on-Avon
- Website: Pillerton Hersey Parish Council

Pillerton Hersey is a village and civil parish about 5.5 miles (9 km) north of Shipston-on-Stour in Warwickshire, England. The village is on a stream that flows northwest to join the River Dene. The 2011 Census recorded the parish's population as 170.

== Parish church ==
The earliest parts of the Church of England parish church of St Mary the Virgin are mid-13th century. They include the Early English chancel, which Pevsner and Wedgwood praised as "uncommonly fine" and having a priest's doorway "of a design which may well be unique". The chancel also has a double piscina and a double aumbry. In about 1400 a south aisle with a two-bay arcade was added to the nave. The nave roof and west tower are Perpendicular Gothic, and the tower was altered and increased in height in the 15th century. The chancel has a 17th-century hammerbeam roof. In the 19th century the south aisle was rebuilt, and in 1845 a north aisle with a three-bay arcade was added. The church is a Grade II* listed building.

The tower has five bells. They were upgraded and rehung in 2016. A second hand bell was found and a new bell cast by John Taylor & Co of Loughborough. The tenor was cast in 1602 by a member of the Newcombe family, who were bellfounders in Leicester. Henry I Bagley of Chacombe. Taylors cast the treble in 2016. The second is the second hand bell and was cast in 1711. The third was cast in 1668 and the fourth bell in 1672. St Mary's serves both Pillerton Hersey and nearby Pillerton Priors, whose own church burnt down in 1672. St Mary's parish is part of the Stourdene Benefice, which includes also the parishes of Alderminster, Butlers Marston, Ettington, Halford and Newbold on Stour.

== Secular buildings ==
Secular listed buildings include the Manor House (now divided into Hersey Manor and The Old Manor), The Old Farmhouse, Brook House, Flaxlands Farm, Vicarage Farm, Mears Farm and Broadclose.

== Amenities ==
Apart from the parish church, a British Telecom telephone kiosk is the only other public amenity in the village.

== Sources ==
- Pevsner, Nikolaus; Wedgwood, Alexandra (1966). Warwickshire. The Buildings of England. Harmondsworth: Penguin Books. pp. 371–372.
- Salzman, L.F, ed. (1949). A History of the County of Warwick. Victoria County History. Vol. 5: Kington Hundred. London: Oxford University Press for the Institute of Historical Research. pp. 133–136.
