= Newbold on Stour =

Village in Warwickshire, England

Coordinates: 52.114°N 1.640°W

- Location within Warwickshire
- OS grid reference: SP2446
- Civil parish: Tredington
- District: Stratford-on-Avon
- Shire county: Warwickshire
- Region: West Midlands
- Country: England
- Sovereign state: United Kingdom
- Post town: Shipston-on-Stour
- Postcode district: CV37
- Dialling code: 01789
- Police: Warwickshire
- Fire: Warwickshire
- Ambulance: West Midlands
- UK Parliament: Stratford-on-Avon

Newbold on Stour is a village in Warwickshire about 6 miles (10 km) south of Stratford upon Avon. Population details are included within Tredington. The Church of England parish church of Saint David was built in 1833. It was restored in 1884-89 and the spire was removed in 1948. St. David's parish is now part of the Benefice of the Stourdene Group, which also includes the parishes of Alderminster, Butlers Marston, Ettington, Halford and Pillerton Hersey. Newbold has a village store and a public house: the White Hart.

== Sources ==
- Pevsner, Nikolaus; Wedgwood, Alexandra (1966). Warwickshire. The Buildings of England. Harmondsworth: Penguin Books. p. 361.
