= Stratford-on-Avon District =

Non-metropolitan district in Warwickshire, England

Coordinates: 52.1902°N 1.7087°W

- Non-metropolitan district
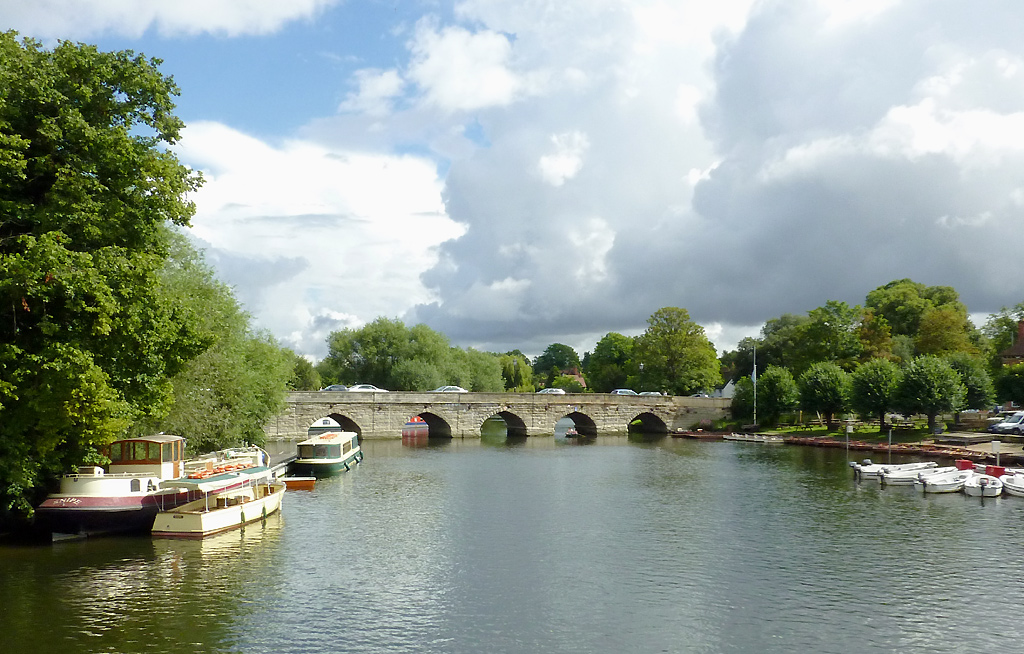
- River Avon at Stratford-upon-Avon

- Shown within Warwickshire
- Sovereign state: United Kingdom
- Constituent country: England
- Region: West Midlands
- Administrative county: Warwickshire
- Admin. HQ: Stratford-upon-Avon

Government
  - Type: Non-metropolitan district
  - MPs: Manuela Perteghella (LD); Jeremy Wright (C)

Area
  - Total: 378 sq mi (978 km^{2})
  - Rank: 27th

Population (2025)
  - Total: 148,772
  - Rank: Ranked 155th
  - Density: 394/sq mi (152/km^{2})

Ethnicity (2021)
  - Ethnic groups: List: 95.5% White; 1.9% Asian; 1.7% Mixed; 0.5% other; 0.4% Black

Religion (2021)
  - Religion: List: 56.4% Christianity; 35.9% no religion; 0.5% Islam; 0.5% Hinduism; 0.1% Judaism; 0.4% Sikhism; 0.3% Buddhism; 0.4% other; 5.5% not stated
- Time zone: UTC+0 (Greenwich Mean Time)
  - Summer (DST): UTC+1 (British Summer Time)
- ONS code: 44UE (ONS); E07000221 (GSS)

Stratford-on-Avon is a local government district in Warwickshire, England. The district is named after its largest town of Stratford-upon-Avon, but with a change of preposition; the town uses "upon" and the district uses "on". The council is based in Stratford-upon-Avon and the district, which is predominantly rural, also includes the towns of Alcester, Henley-in-Arden, Shipston-on-Stour and Southam, and the large villages of Bidford-on-Avon, Studley and Wellesbourne, plus numerous other smaller villages and hamlets and surrounding rural areas. The district covers the more sparsely populated southern part of Warwickshire, and contains nearly half the county's area. The district includes part of the Cotswolds, a designated Area of Outstanding Natural Beauty.

The neighbouring districts are Rugby and Warwick in Warwickshire, Solihull in the West Midlands, Bromsgrove, Redditch and Wychavon in Worcestershire, Cotswold in Gloucestershire, West Oxfordshire and Cherwell in Oxfordshire, and West Northamptonshire.

== History ==
The district was formed on 1 April 1974 under the Local Government Act 1972. The new district covered the area of five former districts, which were all abolished at the same time:

- Alcester Rural District
- Shipston-on-Stour Rural District
- Southam Rural District
- Stratford-on-Avon Rural District (except parish of Hockley Heath, which went to Solihull)
- Stratford-upon-Avon Municipal Borough

The new district was named Stratford-on-Avon after its main town, but using the "Stratford-on-Avon" variant of the name, which had also been used for the rural district which had covered the parishes surrounding the town.

Proposals to merge the district with neighbouring Warwick District were put forward and provisionally agreed, before eventually being abandoned in April 2022.

== Abolition ==
Under current local government reorganisation plans, all district councils in Warwickshire, as well as the county council, were planned to be abolished in 2028, with the district forming part of a new South Warwickshire unitary authority, also including the area of the Warwick District. However, in September 2026, the Secretary of State for Housing, Communities and Local Government paused all ministerial decisions made in July, including South Warwickshire, meaning the 2027 district council election will go ahead. The election in South Warwickshire will now take place on 5 May 2028 with incorporation on 1 April 2029.

== Governance ==
Stratford-on-Avon District Council

Type
- Type: Non-metropolitan district

Leadership
- Chair: Mike Rice, Liberal Democrat since 13 May 2026
- Leader: Susan Juned, Liberal Democrat since 24 May 2023
- Chief Executive: David Buckland since June 2019

Structure
- Seats: 41 councillors
- Political groups: Administration (24) Liberal Democrats (24) Other parties (16) Conservative (10) Green (3) Independent (2) Reform (2)
- Length of term: 4 years

Elections
- Voting system: First past the post
- Last election: 4 May 2023
- Next election: 6 May 2027

Meeting place
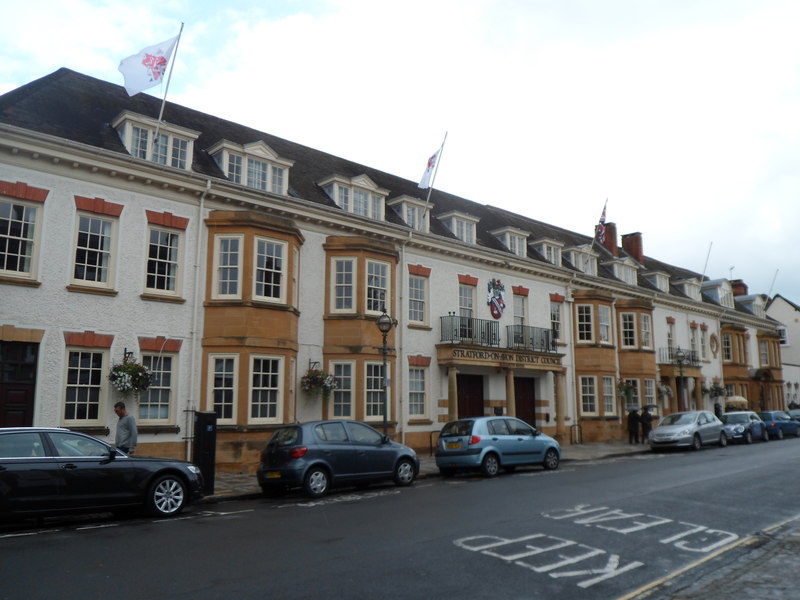
- Elizabeth House, Church Street, Stratford-upon-Avon, CV37 6HX

Website
- www.stratford.gov.uk

Stratford-on-Avon District Council provides district-level services. County-level services are provided by Warwickshire County Council. The whole district is also covered by civil parishes, which form a third tier of local government.

=== Political control ===
The council has been under Liberal Democrat majority control since the 2023 election.

The first election to the council was held in 1973, initially operating as a shadow authority alongside the outgoing councils before coming into its powers on 1 April 1974. Political control of the council since 1974 has been as follows:

Party in control	Years
Independent	1974–1976
No overall control	1976–1979
Conservative	1979–1991
No overall control	1991–1992
Conservative	1992–1994
No overall control	1994–2000
Conservative	2000–2002
No overall control	2002–2003
Conservative	2003–2023
Liberal Democrats	2023–present

=== Leadership ===
The leaders of the council since 2000 have been:

Councillor	Party	From	To
Bob Stevens	Conservative	2000	May 2003
Chris Saint	Conservative	21 May 2003	Jan 2005
Les Topham	Conservative	7 Feb 2005	May 2010
Stephen Gray	Conservative	19 May 2010	18 May 2011
Chris Saint	Conservative	18 May 2011	11 May 2018
Tony Jefferson	Conservative	16 May 2018	May 2023
Susan Juned	Liberal Democrats	24 May 2023	

=== Composition ===
Following the 2023 election, and subsequent changes of allegiance and by-elections up to July 2026, the composition of the council was:

Party	Councillors
Liberal Democrats	24
Conservative	10 (Note: The Conservative group lost a seat due to a defection to Reform, then gained a seat from the Lib Dems in the 2026 Kinwarton by-election)
Green	3
Independent	2
Reform	2
Total	41

The next election is scheduled for 2027.

=== Elections ===
Since the last boundary changes in 2023 the council has comprised 41 councillors representing 39 wards, with each ward electing one or two councillors. Elections are held every four years.

=== Premises ===
The council is based at Elizabeth House on Church Street in Stratford. The oldest part of the building was a house at 15 Church Street, built in 1911 as "Maugersbury House". The house was bought in 1920 by NFU Mutual and converted to be their offices. It was later extended in a similar style along Church Street in 1927 and 1957. The NFU left the building in 1982, after which it was bought by the council and converted to become their offices and meeting place, replacing the five sets of offices inherited from the council's predecessor authorities. The building was formally re-opened as the council's headquarters on 19 April 1985 by Queen Elizabeth The Queen Mother, when it was named "Elizabeth House" in recognition of her visit.

== Towns and parishes ==
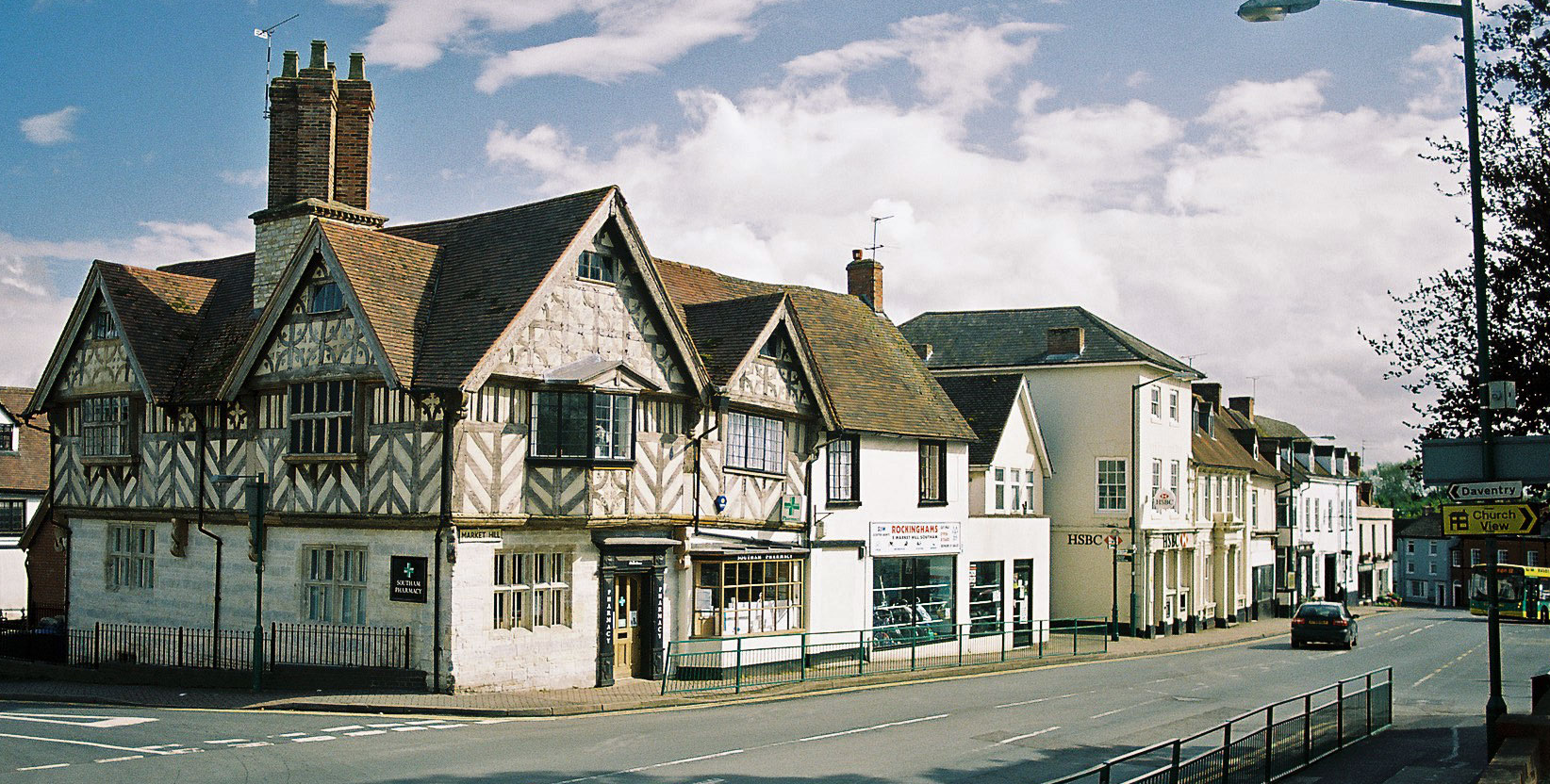
Southam, the district's second largest town.

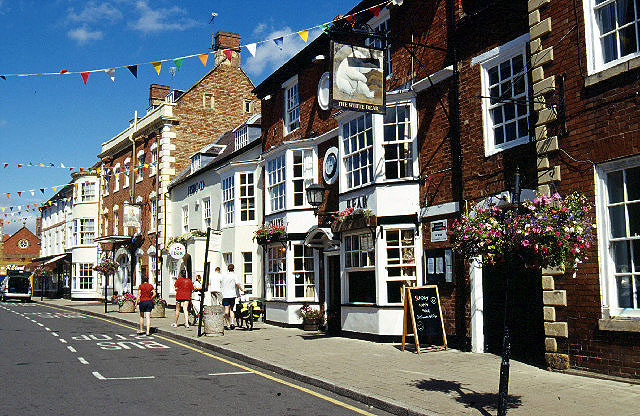
Shipston-on-Stour, another of the district's towns.

Stratford-on-Avon population pyramid

The whole district is covered by civil parishes, of which there are 113. The parish councils for Alcester, Shipston-on-Stour, Southam and Stratford-upon-Avon have declared their parishes to be towns, allowing them to take the style "town council". Some of the smaller parishes have a parish meeting rather than a parish council or share a grouped parish council with neighbouring parishes. Henley-in-Arden and Studley are both post towns, but have parish councils rather than town councils.

The parishes are:

- Admington, Alcester, Alderminster, Ardens Grafton, Arlescote, Arrow, Aston Cantlow, Atherstone-on-Stour, Avon Dassett,
- Barcheston, Barton-on-the-Heath, Bearley, Beaudesert, Bidford-on-Avon, Billesley, Binton, Bishops Itchington, Brailes, Broom, Burmington, Burton Dassett, Butlers Marston
- Chadshunt, Chapel Ascote, Charlecote, Cherington, Chesterton and Kingston, Claverdon, Clifford Chambers and Milcote, Combrook, Compton Verney, Compton Wynyates, Coughton
- Dorsington
- Ettington, Exhall
- Farnborough, Fenny Compton, Fulbrook
- Gaydon, Great Alne, Great Wolford
- Halford, Hampton Lucy, Harbury, Haselor, Henley-in-Arden, Hodnell and Wills Pastures, Honington
- Idlicote, Ilmington
- Kineton, Kinwarton
- Ladbroke, Langley, Lighthorne, Lighthorne Heath, Little Compton, Little Wolford, Long Compton, Long Itchington, Long Marston, Lower Shuckburgh, Loxley, Luddington
- Milcote, Moreton Morrell, Morton Bagot
- Napton-on-the-Hill, Newbold Pacey, Northend
- Oldberrow, Oversley Green, Oxhill
- Pillerton Hersey, Pillerton Priors, Preston Bagot, Preston-on-Stour, Priors Hardwick, Priors Marston
- Quinton
- Radbourne, Radway, Ratley and Upton
- Salford Priors, Sambourne, Shipston-on-Stour, Shotteswell, Snitterfield, Southam, Spernall, Stockton, Stoneton, Stourton, Stratford-upon-Avon, Stretton-on-Fosse, Studley, Sutton-under-Brailes
- Tanworth-in-Arden, Temple Grafton, Tidmington, Tredington, Tysoe
- Ufton, Ullenhall, Upper Shuckburgh, Warmington, Watergall, Weethley, Welford-on-Avon, Wellesbourne, Weston-on-Avon, Whatcote, Whichford, Whitchurch, Willington, Wilmcote, Wixford, Wolverton, Wootton Wawen, Wormleighton

== See also ==
- List of wards in Stratford district by population
