= List of wards in Stratford-on-Avon District by population =

This is a guide to the size of the wards in Stratford district based on the data from the 2001 UK Census. The entire population of the district was 111,484.

Rank	Ward	Population
1	Wellesbourne	6,773
2	Southam	6,509
3	Bidford and Salford	6,446
4	Stratford Avenue and New Town	6,362
5	Stratford Guild and Hathaway	6,303
6	Alcester	6,129
7	Studley	5,939
8	Stratford Alveston	5,202
9	Harbury	4,617
10	Shipston	4,456
11	Stratford Mount Pleasant	4,277
12	Kineton	4,228
13	Henley-in-Arden	4,176
14	Tanworth	3,725
15	Stockton and Napton	2,449
16	Long Itchington	2,400
17	Fenny Compton	2,385
18	Tredington	2,360
19	Snitterfield	2,251
20	Claverdon	2,246
21	Vale of the Red Horse	2,237
22	Quinton	2,233
23	Brailes	2,062
24	Kinwarton	2,061
25	Ettington	2,057
26	Burton Dassett	2,044
27	Welford-on-Avon	2,032
28	Long Compton	1,994
29	Aston Cantlow	1,930
30	Sambourne	1,805
31	Bardon	1,796

N.B. Ward populations will differ from the village population which they are named after and which they are linked to as ward boundaries very rarely match village boundaries exactly.
