= Chapel Ascote =

- Civil parish
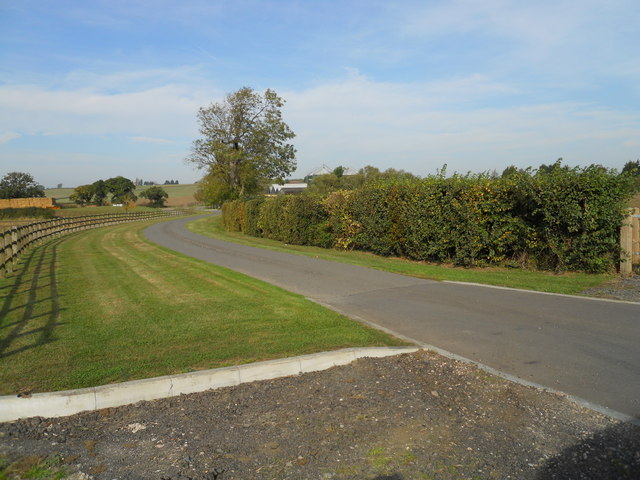

- Location within Warwickshire
- Area: 2.450 km^{2} (0.946 sq mi)
- Population: 18 (2021 census)
  - Density: 7/km^{2} (18/sq mi)
- District: Stratford-on-Avon
- Shire county: Warwickshire
- Region: West Midlands
- Country: England
- Sovereign state: United Kingdom
- Postcode district: CV47
- Police: Warwickshire
- Fire: Warwickshire
- Ambulance: West Midlands
- UK Parliament: Kenilworth and Southam

Chapel Ascote is a civil parish in the Stratford-on-Avon district, in Warwickshire, England, south of Ladbroke near the A423 road. The parish of Bishop's Itchington lies to the west. In 2021 the parish had a population of 18.

== Name ==
The parish was historically known under a variety of names; the earliest recorded is "Astanescote", from the 12th century. The name evolved and was recorded as just "Ascote" in 1372; in 1667 it was first recorded as "Chappell Ascott". The etymology of the name is unclear: one theory is that the name derives from "Ēadstan's cote". Another suggests it comes from "Aelfstan's cottages"; Aelfstan being a man granted land in Bishop's Itchington.

== Chapel of St Helen ==
There was a medieval chapel in the parish. There is a 20-metre-long, 10 metre-wide mound in a field. A chapel is known to have existed in 1208 at the earliest; it was probably abandoned by 1595, and subsequently torn down in 1632. Drainage works in the field revealed medieval-era skeletons.

== Geography ==
=== Climate ===
Chapel Ascote has a temperate oceanic climate (Köppen: Cfb), meaning it has a narrow temperature range, with moderate summers and relatively mild and cool winters.

The Met Office provides a forecast service for adjacent Bishop's Itchington.
