= River Itchen =

The River Itchen may refer to:

- River Itchen, Hampshire, England
- River Itchen, Warwickshire, England
