= Harbury =

Village in Warwickshire, England

Coordinates: 52.2410°N 1.4507°W

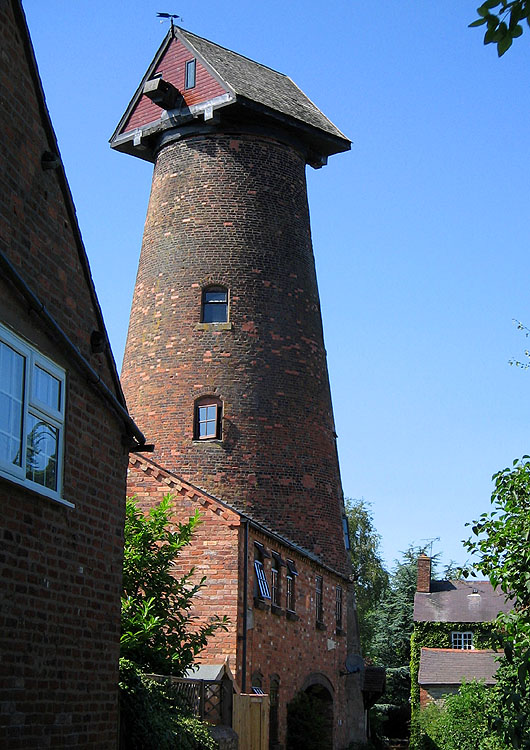
- Harbury Windmill

- Location within Warwickshire
- Population: 2,706 (2021 Census)
- OS grid reference: SP3760
- Civil parish: Harbury
- District: Stratford-on-Avon
- Shire county: Warwickshire
- Region: West Midlands
- Country: England
- Sovereign state: United Kingdom
- Post town: Leamington Spa
- Postcode district: CV33
- Dialling code: 01926
- Police: Warwickshire
- Fire: Warwickshire
- Ambulance: West Midlands
- UK Parliament: Kenilworth and Southam
- Website: Harbury parish council

Harbury is a village and civil parish in the Stratford-on-Avon district of Warwickshire, England. It is about 3 miles (5 km) west-southwest of Southam and about 5 miles (8 km) southeast of Royal Leamington Spa. The parish includes the hamlet of Deppers Bridge. The 2021 Census recorded the parish's population as 2,706. The village is on a ridge of lias up to 390 feet (119 m) high that runs roughly northeast – southwest. The parish covers 3,397 acres (1,375 ha). It is bounded by the River Itchen to the east, Fosse Way to the northwest, a minor road to the south and field boundaries on its other sides. Adjoining parishes are Bishop's Itchington, Bishop's Tachbrook, Chesterton, Ladbroke and Southam. The A425 road and the Chiltern Main Line pass through the parish just north of Harbury village. Junction 12 on the M40 motorway is about 3 miles (5 km) south of the village.

== History ==
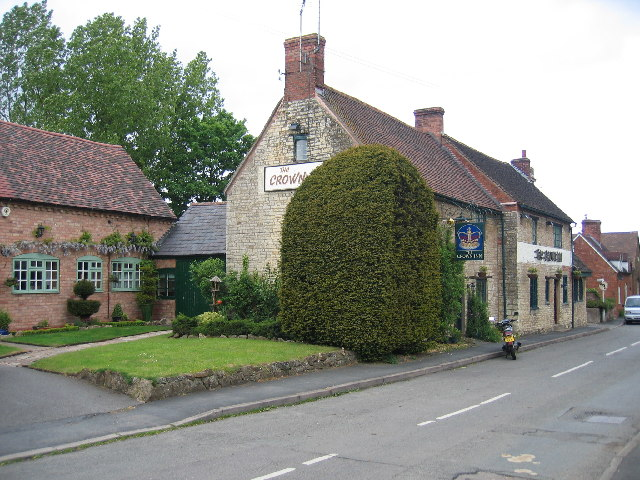
The Crown Inn, built in the 18th century

A middle Bronze Age burial (carbon dated 1530–1320 BCE) has been found near a Neolithic pit to the north-west of the village. Bronze Age pits and hearths, carbon dated to c. 1000 BCE, were found in 1972 near Sharmer Farm in the north of the parish. Although Harbury is close to the Fosse Way, a major Roman Road, only a few artefacts from this period are listed. The toponym "Harbury" is from Old English, said to be derived from Edgar, an early tribal leader. The Domesday Book of 1086 records the manor as Edburberie where it is listed amongst lands granted to Henry de Ferrers by William the Conqueror. The land employed five ploughs and was valued at £4.

At the time of the Hundred Rolls in 1279 two windmills were recorded in the parish. The present brick-built tower mill in Mill Lane is late 18th-century. It is disused and has no sails. The earliest known bridge over the river Itchen at Deppers Bridge was built by the Lords of the Manor of Ladbroke. It is known to have existed by 1397, when it was out of repair and their lordships were ordered to have it renewed. In 1611 the legacy of Thomas Wagstaff, late Lord of the Manor, established a school in the parish. An inscribed panel on the building records that his will was contested until settled by a Decree in Chancery in 1637. The former schoolhouse is an early 17th-century building of limestone, with mullioned and transomed windows, a schoolroom and Tudor fireplaces.

Harbury Inclosure Act 1779
- Act of Parliament
- Parliament of Great Britain
- Long title: An Act for dividing and enclosing the Open and Common Fields, and Common or Commonable Meadows, Pastures, Lands and Grounds and Waste Land, within the Parish of Herberbury otherwise Harbury, in the County of Warwick.
- Citation: 19 Geo. 3. c. 35 Pr.
- Territorial extent: Great Britain

Dates
- Royal assent: 1 April 1779
- Commencement: 26 November 1778 (Note: Start of session.)

Status: Current legislation

The cover of a silver chalice from the parish church is inscribed Harberbery 1576. Christopher Saxton's 1576 map of Warwickshire and Leicestershire marks the village as Harburbury. An open field system prevailed in the parish until the Harbury Inclosure Act 1779 (19 Geo. 3. c. 35 Pr.) was implemented, enclosing 120 yardlands (3,600 acres (1,457 ha)) of common land. The earliest known record of a post office in the village is from September 1847, when a type of postmark called an undated circle was issued. The Harbury Heritage Group maintains a heritage room at the village primary school.

== Parish church ==
The Church of England parish church of All Saints has a 13th-century chancel with lancet windows. The southwest tower is later 13th-century, also with lancet windows. The south and north aisles and arcades were added in about 1300. The font and the embattled top of the tower are Georgian additions. In 1873 the church was restored and the south aisle widened and new Gothic Revival windows inserted in the east and north walls of the chancel. The stained glass in several of the windows is from the 1890s. In 1811 Thomas II Mears of the Whitechapel Bell Foundry recast the tower's bells as a ring of five. This may be when the top of the tower was rebuilt in brick. In 1959 John Taylor & Co of Loughborough recast the bells as a ring of six, and in 1981 Taylor & Co cast a new treble and second bell, increasing the ring to eight. The parish of All Saints is now part of the benefice of Harbury and Ladbroke.

== Transport ==
=== Railway and cutting ===
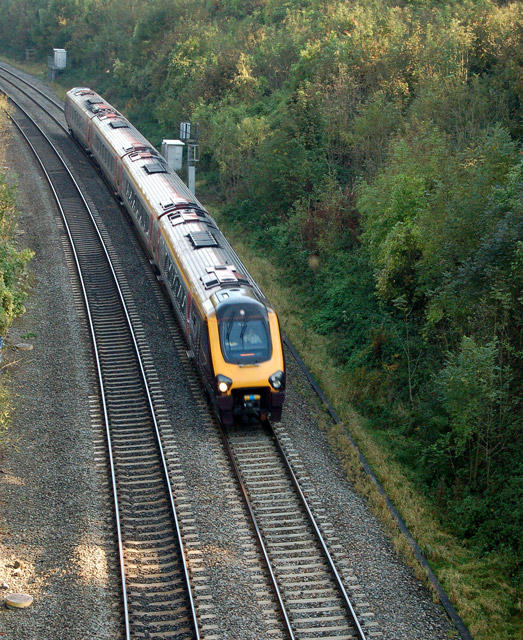
A CrossCountry Voyager train in Harbury cutting

Building of the Birmingham and Oxford Junction Railway between Birmingham Moor Street and Fenny Compton through the parish started in 1847 and was completed in 1852. Southam Road and Harbury railway station opened that year, at Deppers Hill about 1 mile (1.6 km) east of the village. By the time the line opened in 1852 it was part of the Great Western Railway. In 1948 it was nationalised as part of British Railways, which closed the station to goods traffic in 1963 and passenger traffic in 1964. The station has since been demolished. The railway remains open as part of the Chiltern Main Line, carrying both Chiltern Railways and CrossCountry passenger trains and much freight traffic. The railway passes through the ridge northeast of the village.

Originally a tunnel was planned, but its geology of Jurassic Blue Lias proved too unstable. Instead a cutting up to 110 feet (34 m) deep was dug between 1847 and 1852, which in 1850 was described as "one of the deepest in the Kingdom, being 104 feet deep and 600 wide". There is a tunnel, but for a distance of only 73 yards (67 m) through a high part of Deppers Hill where there is a road junction. The tunnel portals were built with high retaining walls to protect them from subsidence. Parts of the cutting have suffered subsidence a number of times. In 1884 the Great Western Railway widened the cutting to make its slopes shallower in the hope of preventing further slips.

On 14 February 2014 part of the cutting at the end of the tunnel near Bishop's Itchington subsided. All train services were suspended for several days while Network Rail worked to clear the damaged section of the slope and try to stabilise it. Network Rail was still working on the cutting by 31 January 2015 when part of it subsided again, and again the line had to be closed to all train services. The next day it was announced that about 350,000 tons of unstable rock and earth would have to be removed, and assessment of the site before clearance could start could take several days. On 3 February Network Rail chairman Mark Carne described the landslip as "a massive incident" and said the line may be closed for "several weeks". A fortnight later NR announced that it would reopen the railway "by Easter", i.e. 2 April. On 4 March it brought the reopening date forward by three weeks to 13 March.

=== Bus ===
Buses are run by Stagecoach Midlands. Services run to Leamington Spa, Warwick, Banbury, Kineton and Long Itchington.

== Harbury quarry ==
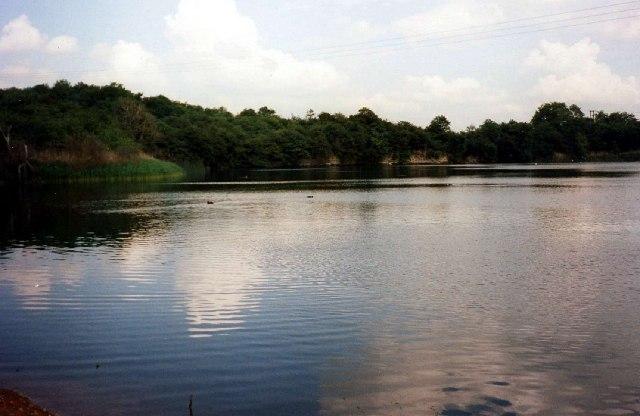
Mitre Pool, part of the former cement quarry at Bishop's Bowl Lakes

As well as linking Birmingham and Oxford, the new railway provided a connection for the Greaves Works in Bishop's Itchington that since 1820 had been quarrying Blue Lias and turning it into cement. The business became Greaves, Bull and Lakin and in 1855 opened a new cement works. Production increased in phases over the next seven decades, and quarrying extended across the parish boundary into Harbury. Allied Cement Manufacturers, makers of Red Triangle Cement, bought the quarry and works in 1927 but went bankrupt in 1931. Associated Portland Cement, now Blue Circle Industries, bought ACM's assets in 1932 and continued production. Cement-making was ended in 1970 and the site was turned into a depot. The site was cleared in 1994. The deep quarries on the Harbury side of the parish boundary have since been converted into Bishops Bowl Lakes, which is a coarse fishing facility. During a heat wave in the summer of 2018 a 17-year-old boy from Daventry drowned after getting into difficulty in the lake, this prompted the tightening of security at the site.

== Natural History and Geology ==
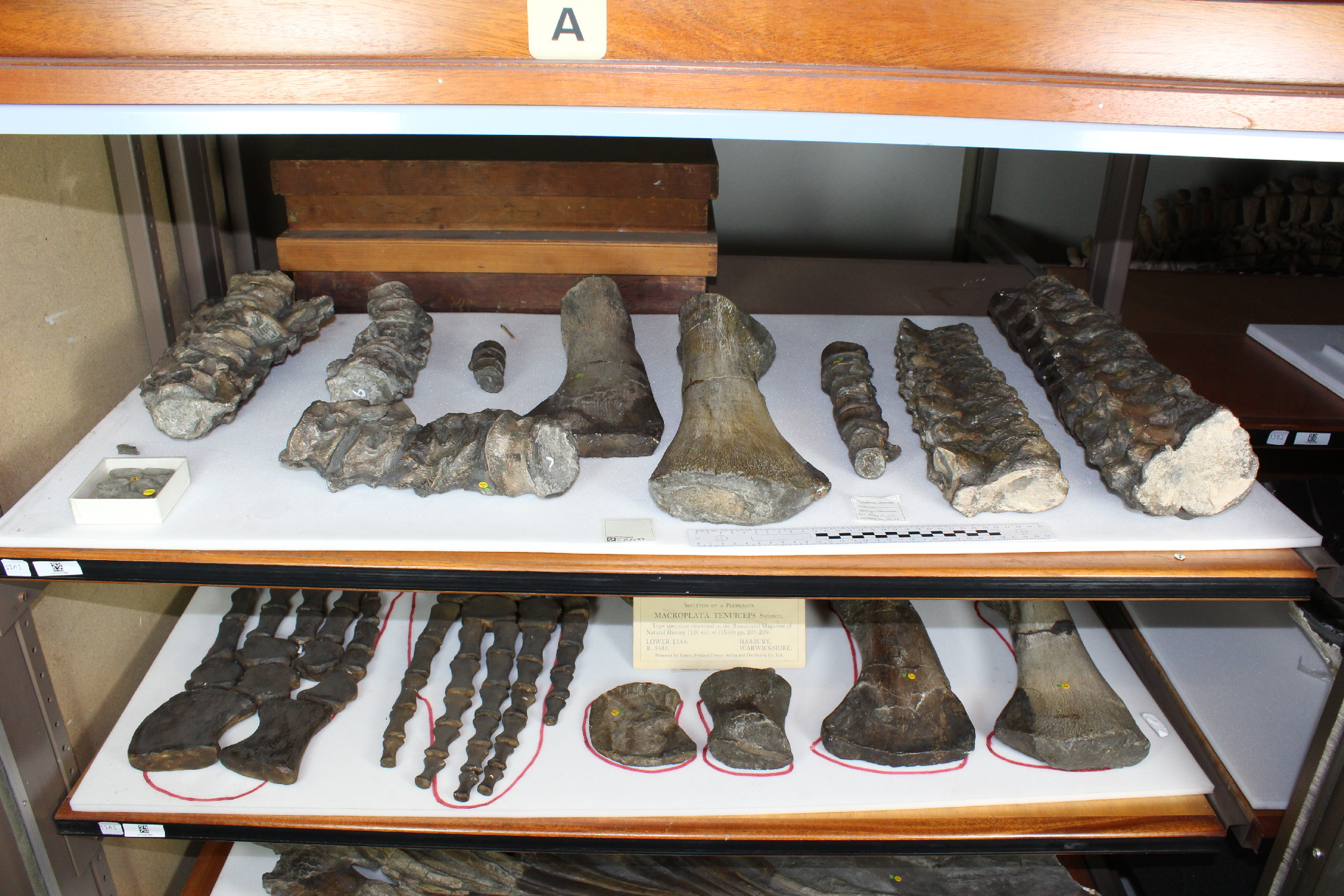
Harbury plesiosaur fossil in the Natural History Museum

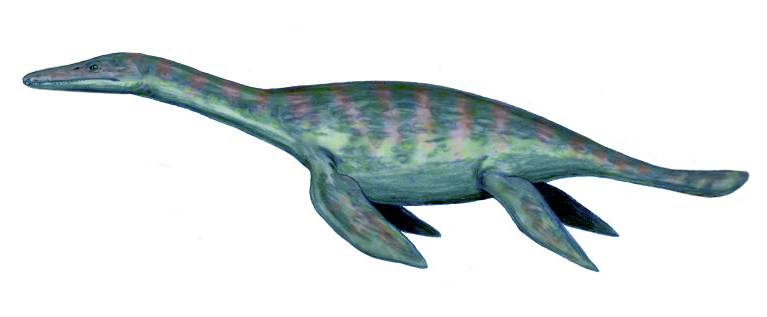
Macroplata: the Harbury plesiosaur

Harbury lies on the Blue Lias, a Lower Jurassic marine sediment that also forms the unstable sea cliffs at Lyme Regis on the Dorset coast. As at Lyme Regis, the Blue Lias at Harbury is rich in marine fossils. In 1927 and 1928 the skeletons of two marine reptiles were found in Harbury quarry. They are an ichthyosaur and a plesiosaur, and both fossils are now in the Natural History Museum, London. The plesiosaur is the unique example of the early Jurassic species Macroplata tenuiceps.

=== Harbury Spoilbank ===
Harbury Spoilbank nature reserve, a Warwickshire Wildlife Trust site, is located 1 km east of Harbury on the B4452 on the left going towards Deppers Bridge. It covers 6.7 hectares and the clay spoilbanks host species-rich grassland with flowering plants including cowslip, early forget-me-not, hairy violet and orchids such as Twayblade and Common Spotted-Orchid. More than 20 species of butterfly have been found, including early species such as brimstone, green hairstreak, holly blue, the grizzled skipper and dingy skipper. The Harbury Spoilbank nature reserve is part of the larger Harbury Railway Cutting Site of Special Scientific Interest that extends westwards from the nature reserve along both sides of the railway for approximately 2 km.

== Amenities ==
Harbury has a primary school with about 200 pupils. A day nursery provides childcare for children aged 3 months to 5 years. A pre-school provides sessional early years education for children aged 2 yrs 9 months to school entry. The village has a GP practice and a volunteer-run public library. There is a village hall and a village social club. There are playing fields behind the village hall with a playground, netball court, football pitches, a BMX track, a skate park, an all-weather walking route and a car park. The recreation ground has three tennis courts that are used by the village tennis club. Harbury has a Rugby football club with its own ground and clubhouse, which it shares with the village Cricket Club. The village also has a junior football club.

Harbury has a pharmacy and two supermarkets, one is a branch of the Co-Op and the other has a sub-post office. The nearest filling station is on the Fosse Way, approximately 1.5 miles away. Harbury Village Library is a community library run in association with Warwickshire County Libraries. The Library is open from 9-5pm, Monday to Friday, and 10–12 noon on Saturdays and has full access to County and National books, materials and wide-ranging online resources, as well as its own excellent book collection, and free online use of Ancestry and British Newspaper Archive. It offers a car park, free computers, free Wi-Fi, ongoing art exhibitions, regular half hour song and story sessions for pre-schoolers, and pop-up displays of local interest. Biblio's Cafe is also in the library

== Notable people ==
- Philip Bushill-Matthews, former Conservative MEP for the West Midlands constituency, and former managing director of Red Mill Snack Foods.
- Elizabeth Hands, poet, was baptised in Harbury in 1746 when her parents lived in the village, but lived for much of her life in Bourton-on-Dunsmore, around 8 miles away. She was unusual at the time in being a published working-class woman poet: her best-known work is The Death of Amnon in a volume that also includes a poem written about a mad heifer running amok through a village.
- Richard Jago, parson and poet, was vicar of Harbury from 1746 to 1771. He achieved modest success with his poetry and his published writings include A sermon on occasion of a conversation said to have pass'd between one of the inhabitants and an apparition in the churchyard of Harbury (1755)
- Justin King, the former Chief Executive of J Sainsbury, and his son Jordan King, a Formula 3 racing car driver.
- John Stringer, retired author of resources for primary science education, regular contributor to TES (magazine) and adviser to, or developer (possibly producer) of, educational television programmes for BBC and Channel 4.
- Nikki Sudden and brother Epic Soundtracks, both musicians in the band Swell Maps and Nikki in Jacobites, lived in the village.

== Bibliography ==
- Allen, Geoff (2000). Warwickshire Towns and Villages. Ammanford: Sigma Leisure. ISBN 1-85058-642-X.
- Pevsner, Nikolaus; Wedgwood, Alexandra (1966). Warwickshire. The Buildings of England. Harmondsworth: Penguin Books. p. 307. ISBN 0-14-071031-0.
- Salzman, L.F, ed. (1951). A History of the County of Warwick. Victoria County History. Vol. 6: Knightlow hundred. London: Oxford University Press for the Institute of Historical Research. pp. 103–108.
- Stringer, John (2012). All Saints Church Harbury – The story of a Warwickshire Village Church. Harbury: Parish of All Saints. ISBN 978-0-9550991-4-4.
