= Bishop's Itchington =

Village and civil parish in Warwickshire, England

Coordinates: 52.220°N 1.434°W

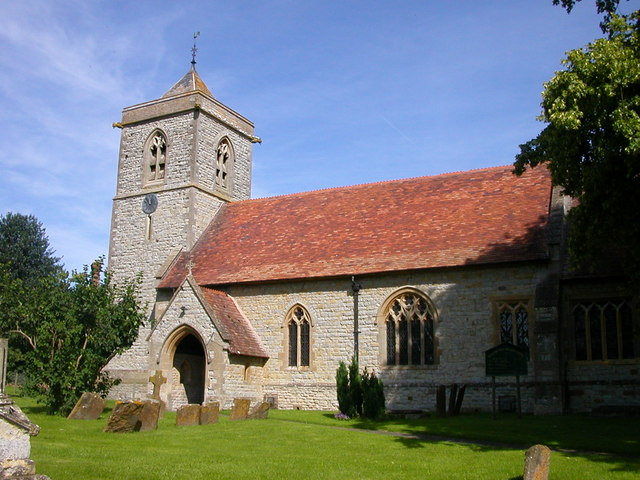
- St Michael's parish church

- Location within Warwickshire
- Population: 2,082 (2011 Census)
- OS grid reference: SP3857
- Civil parish: Bishop's Itchington
- District: Stratford-on-Avon
- Shire county: Warwickshire
- Region: West Midlands
- Country: England
- Sovereign state: United Kingdom
- Post town: Southam
- Postcode district: CV47
- Dialling code: 01926
- Police: Warwickshire
- Fire: Warwickshire
- Ambulance: West Midlands
- UK Parliament: Stratford-on-Avon
- Website: Bishops Itchington Parish Council

Bishop's Itchington is a village and civil parish in the Stratford-on-Avon district of Warwickshire, England. It is about 3 miles (5 km) south-southwest of Southam and about 6.5 miles (10 km) southeast of Royal Leamington Spa. The 2011 Census recorded the parish's population as 2,082.

The River Itchen flows north through the parish. The village is in the northern part of the parish just west of the river, and stands on boulder clay and Lower Lias. The parish covers 3,052 acres (1,235 ha). It is bounded to the south by a minor road, to the east partly by the A423 road and on other sides by field boundaries.

The Chiltern Main Line passes through the parish less than 0.5 miles (800 m) east of the village. Junction 12 on the M40 motorway is about 2 miles (3 km) southwest of the village.

== History ==
Bishop's Itchington Inclosure Act 1774
- Act of Parliament
- Parliament of Great Britain
- Long title: An Act for dividing and enclosing several Pieces and Parcels of Land, called Bishop's Itchington Heath, Christmas Hill, Palmer's Furze, The Olt, and Commonable Places, within the Parish of Bishop’s Itchington, in the County of Warwick.
- Citation: 14 Geo. 3. c. 28 Pr.
- Territorial extent: Great Britain

Dates
- Royal assent: 31 March 1774
- Commencement: 13 January 1774 (Note: Start of session.)

Status: Current legislation

The village's toponym is derived from the River Itchen. Its affix refers to the Bishops of Lichfield, who by 1152 had succeeded St. Mary's Priory, Coventry as Lord of the Manor. It was formerly called Upper Itchington. Lower Itchington to the southwest was depopulated in 1547 by Thomas Fisher. An open field system prevailed in the parish until the Bishop's Itchington Inclosure Act 1774 (14 Geo. 3. c. 28 Pr.) was implemented.

The Birmingham and Oxford Junction Railway was built through the parish and in 1852 Southam Road and Harbury railway station was opened at Deppers Bridge 1 mile (1.6 km) north of the village. The railway became part of the Great Western Railway until 1948, when was nationalised as part of British Railways. BR closed the station to goods traffic in 1963 and passenger traffic in 1964. It has since been demolished. The railway remains open as part of the Chiltern Main Line, carrying both Chiltern Railways and CrossCountry passenger trains and much freight traffic.

== Cement works ==
In 1820 Richard Greaves started a lime kiln using Blue Lias from a quarry just north of the village. Completion of the railway in 1852 made it easier for the works to obtain coal and distribute its lime and cement. The business became Greaves, Bull and Lakin and in 1855 opened a new cement works. By 1882 it had four bottle kilns and was making 120 tons of Portland cement a week. The Great Western revised the railway junction to the works in 1883 and had a signal box built for it in 1899. By 1907 there were 18 chamber kilns making 600 tons a week, and more railway track was laid including a second connection to the works. Quarrying extended across the parish boundary into Harbury.

In 1909 Krupp installed the first rotary kiln at the works. It was 98 feet (30 m) long and made 78 tons of cement clinker a day. In 1912 Ernest Newell and Company of Misterton, Nottinghamshire supplied a second and larger rotary kiln, and the old chamber kilns were taken out of use. In 1918 the GWR replaced the 1899 signal box. In 1924 Edgar Allen and Company of Sheffield supplied a third rotary kiln, which was 160 feet (49 m) long. In the same year the Newell kiln was lengthened to 160 feet and the Krupp kiln was extended to 48 feet (15 m), raising total production to 343 tons a day.

The cement works had three industrial railway systems: one standard gauge, one three foot gauge and one 1ft 11 1/2in gauge. The standard gauge system used saddle tank steam locomotives: four 0-4-0s and one Hunslet 0-6-0. The three foot gauge system used a mixture of Peckett and other 0-4-0 saddle tanks, a Kerr, Stuart 0-4-2ST, Sentinel vertical-boiler locomotives and Fowler diesel locomotives. The 1 ft 11 1/2in gauge system used Simplex petrol-engined locomotives.

Allied Cement Manufacturers, makers of Red Triangle Cement, bought the quarry and works in 1927 but went bankrupt in 1931. Associated Portland Cement, now Blue Circle Industries, bought ACM's assets in 1932 and continued production. APC installed newer second-hand kilns from Ellesmere Port in 1933 and Burham, Kent in 1937, which replaced the old Krupp and Newell kilns. The 1 ft 11 1/2in gauge railway had been removed by 1946 and the three foot gauge railway seems to have been out of use by 1947.

The standard gauge railway survived until the 1960s. Its last locomotive was a 1931 Hunslet 0-6-0ST that APC bought and moved to the cement works in 1957. It had originally been used by contractors building the King George V Graving Dock in Southampton, and consequently had acquired the name Cunarder. In 1969 a group of Buckinghamshire Railway Centre members bought Cunarder for preservation and moved it to Quainton Road railway station in Buckinghamshire. It has since been used at the Swanage Railway and Lavender Line, was then restored and is now stored near Poole, Dorset.

In 1970 Blue Circle ceased cement-making at the site and turned it into a depot. The site was cleared in 1994. Blue Circle no longer exists.

== Church and chapels ==
The Church of England parish church of Saint Michael originated as a chapel of ease for All Saints' parish church in Lower Itchington. Parts of the chapel building dated from the 17th century and a small brick-built tower was added in 1834. In 1872 the chapel was demolished and replaced by the present church, which was designed by the Gothic Revival architect Ewan Christian. The tower has a ring of five bells that John Taylor & Co of Loughborough cast in 1874. Deteriorating church fabric, and in particular the tower, led to a restoration programme that was completed early in 2011. The bells were out of use for many years, but were rung on the weekend of 12–13 February 2011.

The village's Congregational chapel was built in 1836 or 1837 and is now a private house. A Methodist chapel for the village was built in 1859.

== Amenities ==
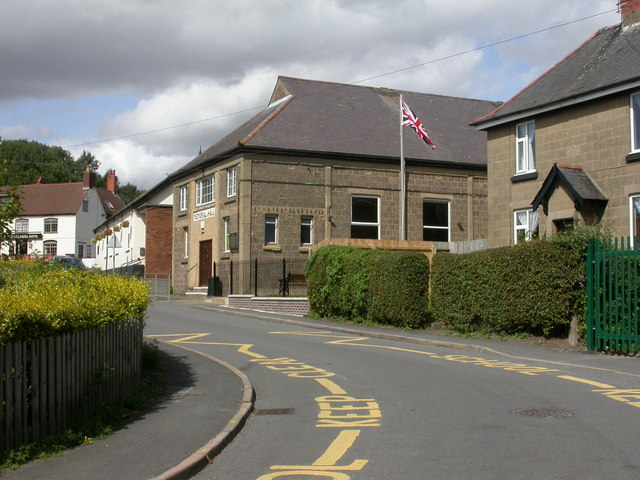
Bishop's Itchington Memorial Hall

Bishop's Itchington has one pub, The Butchers Arms. It has also a working men's club that is still called the Greaves Club after the original name of the cement works. The Royal British Legion had a branch in the village, but it has closed and its premises are now a café. There is a village shop, newsagent and sub-post office. The parish has a primary school.

== Sources and further reading ==
- Harbury Cement Works Masterplan (PDF). Stratford-upon-Avon: Stratford-on-Avon District Council. January 2008. Archived from the original (PDF) on 6 February 2015.
- James, Peter (1980). wr: The Story of a Warwickshire Village. Stratford-upon-Avon.
- Pevsner, Nikolaus; Wedgwood, Alexandra (1966). Warwickshire. The Buildings of England. Harmondsworth: Penguin Books. p. 214. ISBN 0-14-0710-31-0.
- Salzman, L.F, ed. (1951). A History of the County of Warwick. Victoria County History. Vol. 6: Knightlow Hundred. London: Oxford University Press for the Institute of Historical Research. pp. 121–124.
