= Cherington, Warwickshire =

Village and civil parish in England

Coordinates: 52.03°N 1.58°W

Cherington
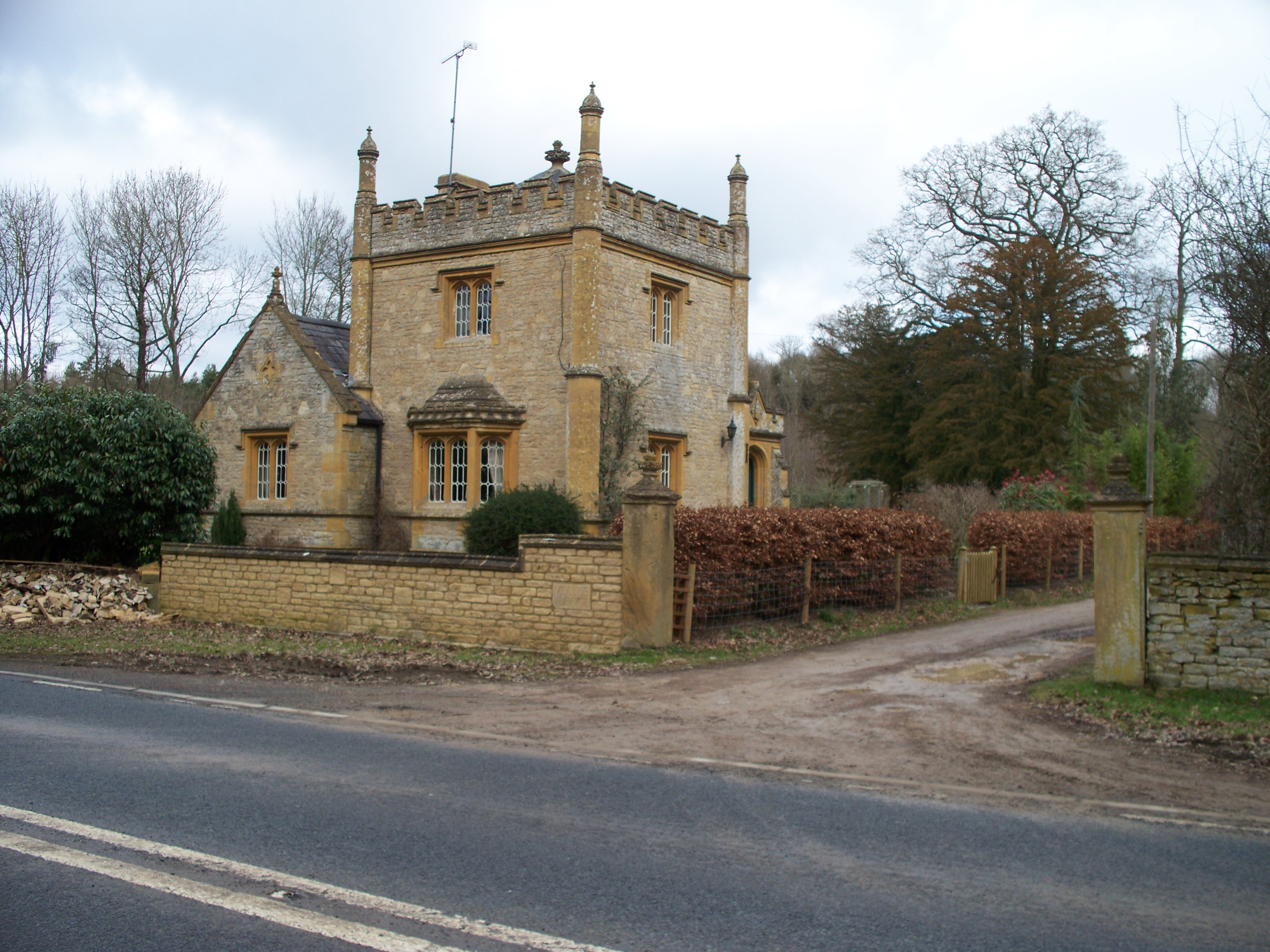
- Molly's Lodge

- Location within Warwickshire
- Population: 214 (2011)
- OS grid reference: SP2936
- Civil parish: Cherington
- District: Stratford-on-Avon
- Shire county: Warwickshire
- Region: West Midlands
- Country: England
- Sovereign state: United Kingdom
- Post town: Shipston-on-Stour
- Postcode district: CV36
- Dialling code: 01608
- Police: Warwickshire
- Fire: Warwickshire
- Ambulance: West Midlands
- UK Parliament: Stratford-on-Avon
- Website: Cherington, Stourton & Sutton-under-Brailes

Cherington is a village and civil parish beside the River Stour about 3 miles (5 km) southeast of Shipston-on-Stour. Cherington is contiguous with the village of Stourton.

== History ==
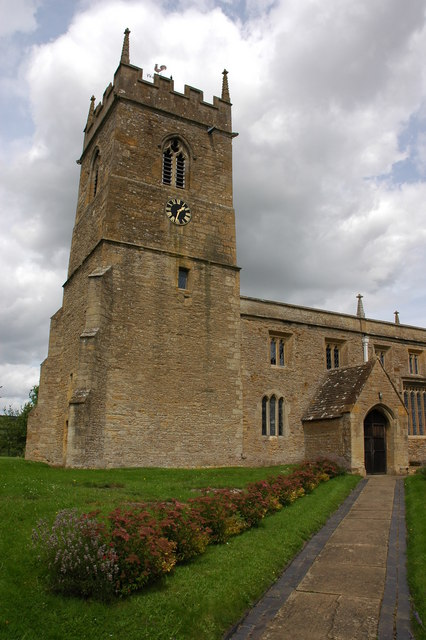
St John the Baptist's Church

The Church of England parish church of Saint John the Baptist has many 13th-century features, including the Early English Gothic east windows of the chancel and north aisle, one of the south windows of the nave, the arcade of two bays between the nave and north aisle and the lower stages of the bell tower. At the east end of the north aisle, in a piercing in the wall between the aisle and nave, is the effigy from about 1320 of a man in civilian clothes believed to be a Franklin. The upper stages of the tower are 15th-century, as are the Perpendicular Gothic clerestory and present roof of the nave. A large window in the south wall of the nave is also Perpendicular Gothic.

The chancel arch was probably built in about 1500 or the early part of the 16th century. Two of the windows in the north wall of the north aisle and the battlements at the top of the tower are 18th-century additions. The church tower had three bells until 1842 when one was recast, two more were added to make a ring of five and all were rehung. In 2006 John Taylor & Co recast one of the 1842 bells, cast another to increase the ring to six and rehung them all. Cherington House may be 17th-century. Cherington Mill is on the River Stour.

== Amenities ==
Cherington has a public house, the Cherington Arms, that belongs to the Hook Norton Brewery.

== Sources ==
- Allen, Geoff (2000). Warwickshire: Towns and Villages. Towns & villages of Britain. Sigma Leisure. ISBN 1-85058-642-X.
- Pevsner, Nikolaus; Wedgwood, Alexandra (1966). Warwickshire. The Buildings of England. Harmondsworth: Penguin Books. pp. 229–230.
- Salzman, L.F., ed. (1949). "Parishes: Cherington". Victoria County History: A History of the County of Warwick, Volume 5: Kington Hundred. London. pp. 38–41.
