= Whatcote =

Village in Warwickshire, England

Coordinates: 52.098°N 1.565°W

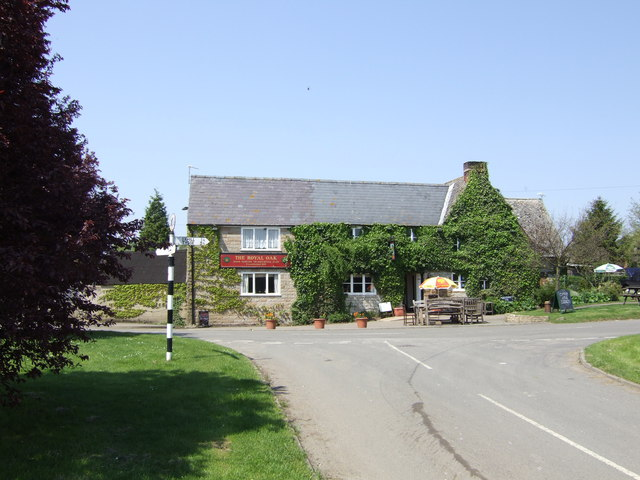
- The Royal Oak, Whatcote

- Location within Warwickshire
- Population: 143 (2011 census)
- OS grid reference: SP2944
- Civil parish: Whatcote
- District: Stratford-on-Avon
- Shire county: Warwickshire
- Region: West Midlands
- Country: England
- Sovereign state: United Kingdom
- Post town: Shipston-on-Stour
- Postcode district: CV36
- Dialling code: 01295
- Police: Warwickshire
- Fire: Warwickshire
- Ambulance: West Midlands
- UK Parliament: Stratford-on-Avon

Whatcote is a village and civil parish in Warwickshire, England, about 4 miles (6.4 km) northeast of Shipston on Stour in the Vale of the Red Horse. The population at the 2011 census was 143.

== Manor ==
The Domesday Book records that in 1086 Hugh de Grandmesnil, one of William the Conqueror's military commanders, owned the manor of Whatcote. In the latter half of the 14th century Thomas Stafford, 3rd Earl of Stafford acquired the manor. It remained with the Stafford family until 1520 when Edward Stafford conveyed the manor to Sir William Compton. It remained with the Compton family, the Marquess of Northampton until early in the 19th century, but by 1826 it had been acquired by Sir Adolphus Dalrymple. By 1865 Sir Adolphus had sold it to the Peach family, who in turn sold it to Thomas Parker.

== Parish church ==
The Church of England parish church of St. Peter was built in the first half of the 12th century. The nave survives from this period, with a Norman doorway and two Norman windows in the north wall. The tower and several windows in the south wall were added late in the 13th century and the chancel was rebuilt in about 1300. One of the windows in the south wall of the chancel is a 14th-century addition. The south porch, and the parapet and two of the bell-chamber windows of the tower, are 15th century additions. In the 16th or 17th century a buttress was added to shore up part of the north wall. A German bomb badly damaged the nave and porch in 1941 and the building was restored in 1947.

The church tower has three bells. The tenor had been cast in 1652 but was recast by Henry Bond of Burford, Oxfordshire in 1897. John Clark of Evesham cast the second bell in 1711. The treble bell was cast in 1766 but was recast by William Blews & Sons of Birmingham in 1878. In the churchyard are the base and shaft of a medieval cross, from which the top has been lost and replaced with a 17th or early 18th century sundial. St. Peter's is now part of a single benefice with the neighbouring parishes of Oxhill and Tysoe.

== Amenities ==
Whatcote has a public house, the Royal Oak, which has held a Michelin star since 2020.

== Sources ==
- Edwards, Tudor (1950). Warwickshire. London: P. Elek. p. 50.
- Pevsner, Nikolaus; Alexandra, Wedgwood (1966). Warwickshire. The Buildings of England. Harmondsworth: Penguin Books. p. 470.
- Salzman, Louis F., ed. (1949). A History of the County of Warwick, Volume 5: Kington Hundred. Victoria County History. pp. 202–205.
