= Southam Road and Harbury railway station =

Former railway station in Warwickshire, England

Southam Road and Harbury
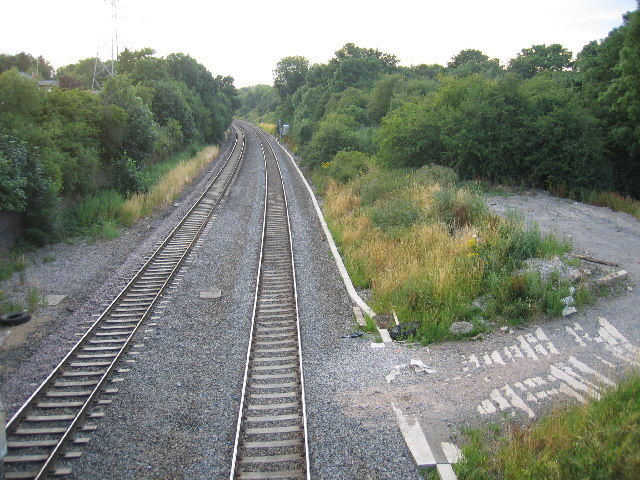
- Station remains in 2005

General information
- Location: Harbury, District of Stratford-on-Avon; England
- Coordinates: 52.23457°N 1.43256°W
- Grid reference: SP388597
- Platforms: 2

Other information
- Status: Disused

History
- Original company: Birmingham and Oxford Junction Railway
- Pre-grouping: Great Western Railway
- Post-grouping: Great Western Railway

Key dates
- 1 October 1852: Station opens
- 2 November 1964: Station closes
Location

Southam Road and Harbury railway station was a railway station, located 1 mile (1.6 km) east of Harbury, and 2.5 miles (4.0 km) south-west of Southam, Warwickshire.

== History ==
The station was on the Birmingham and Oxford Junction Railway, which was taken over by the Great Western Railway prior to opening from Banbury to Birmingham on 1 October 1852; Southam Road and Harbury was one of nine intermediate stations originally provided. The station was brick-built and had a goods siding.

British Railways closed the station to goods traffic on 11 November 1963, and to passengers on 2 November 1964. It was subsequently demolished and few traces remain. The route is now part of the Chiltern Main Line.

== Route ==
Preceding station	Historical railways	Following station
Fenny Compton; Line open; station closed	Great Western Railway; Chiltern Main Line	Leamington Spa; Line and station open

== See also ==
- Southam and Long Itchington railway station
