= 2023 Stratford-on-Avon District Council election =

- 4 May 2023

All 41 seats to Stratford-on-Avon District Council 21 seats needed for a majority

	First party	Second party	Third party
Leader	Susan Juned	Tony Jefferson
Party	Liberal Democrats	Conservative	Green
Last election	11 seats, 28.7%	20 seats, 45.8%	1 seat, 12.0%
Seats before	12	19	1
Seats after	25	12	3
Seat change	▲14	▼8	▲2
Popular vote	17,823	14,565	4,373
Percentage	42.6%	34.8%	10.5%
Swing	▲13.9%	▼11.0%	▼1.5%
	Fourth party	Fifth party
Party	Independent	Labour
Last election	4 seats, 6.0%	0 seats, 7.3%
Seats before	3	1
Seats after	1	0
Seat change	▼3	Steady
Popular vote	969	4,001
Percentage	2.3%	9.6%
Swing	▼3.7%	▲2.3%
- Winner of each seat at the 2023 Stratford-on-Avon District Council election

- Composition of the council after the election
Leader before election
Tony Jefferson
Conservative
Leader after election
Susan Juned
Liberal Democrats

The 2023 Stratford-on-Avon District Council election took place on 4 May, the same day as other local elections in England. The election was contested on new boundaries following a review by the Local Government Boundary Commission.

== Summary ==
=== Boundary changes ===
On 29 March 2022, the Local Government Boundary Commission announced the completion of their review of Stratford-on-Avon's ward boundaries. The final recommendation increased the number of councillors from 36 to 41 and the number of wards from 37 to 39. This consisted of 37 single member wards and two 2-member wards. These proposals were approved by Parliament in November 2022 to come into force for the council elections held in May 2023.

=== Election result ===
Prior to the election the council was under Conservative majority control.

At the election, the Liberal Democrats gained overall control of the council for the first time. It was also the first time that any party other than the Conservatives had secured a majority since the creation of the authority in 1974. The Conservative leader of the council, Tony Jefferson, lost his seat. Liberal Democrat councillor Susan Juned was appointed the new leader of the council at the subsequent annual council meeting on 24 May 2023. After the election the Conservatives chose Sarah Whalley-Hoggins to be their new group leader, whilst the newly-formed Green group appointed Dave Passingham as its leader.

2023 Stratford-on-Avon District Council election
Party	Candidates	Seats	Gains	Losses	Net gain/loss	Seats %	Votes %	Votes	+/−
Liberal Democrats	40	25	15	0	▲15	60.10	42.6	18,936	+13.9
Conservative	39	12	0	14	▼14	29.27	34.8	15,920	-11.0
Green	36	3	3	1	▲2	7.32	10.5	4,761	-1.5
Independent	2	1	0	3	▼3	2.44	2.3	969	-3.7
Labour	33	0	0	0	Steady	0.00	9.6	4,001	+2.3
Reform	1	0	0	0	Steady	0.00	0.2	64	N/A

== Ward results ==
The results for each ward were as follows, with an asterisk (*) indicating an incumbent councillor standing for re-election:

=== Alcester East ===
Alcester East
Party	Candidate	Votes	%	±%
Liberal Democrats	Susan Juned*	548	66.7	N/A
Conservative	Emma Daniel	194	23.6	N/A
Labour	Emma Randle	55	6.7	N/A
Green	Penny Stott	25	3.0	N/A
Majority		354	43.1	N/A
Turnout		822	34.4	N/A
Liberal Democrats win (new seat)				

=== Alcester West ===
Alcester West
Party	Candidate	Votes	%	±%
Liberal Democrats	Joe Harmer	478	40.5	N/A
Labour	Andrew Foster	362	30.7	N/A
Conservative	Gavin Smithers	309	26.2	N/A
Green	Nicole Carpenter	31	2.6	N/A
Majority		116	9.8	N/A
Turnout		1,180	46.5	N/A
Liberal Democrats win (new seat)				

=== Bidford East ===
Bidford East
Party	Candidate	Votes	%	±%
Conservative	Darren Pemberton*	355	40.9	N/A
Labour Co-op	Cat Price	293	33.8	N/A
Liberal Democrats	Richard Vos	152	17.5	N/A
Green	Julie Gibson	67	7.7	N/A
Majority		62	7.2	N/A
Turnout		867	31.1	N/A
Conservative win (new seat)				

=== Bidford West ===
Bidford West
Party	Candidate	Votes	%	±%
Conservative	Bill Fleming*	341	45.5	N/A
Liberal Democrats	Cliff Brown	203	27.1	N/A
Labour	Paul Dempsey	139	18.5	N/A
Green	Georgina Evans-Goodrich	67	8.9	N/A
Majority		138	18.4	N/A
Turnout		750	31.0	N/A
Conservative win (new seat)				

=== Bishops Itchington, Fenny Compton & Napton ===
Bishops Itchington, Fenny Compton & Napton (2 seats)
Party	Candidate	Votes	%	±%
Liberal Democrats	Nigel Rock*	998	49.7	N/A
Liberal Democrats	Natalie Gist	955	47.5	N/A
Conservative	Christopher Kettle*	855	42.6	N/A
Conservative	Keith Bushnell	672	33.4	N/A
Labour	Judith Leask	200	10.0	N/A
Green	Seth Colton	188	9.4	N/A
Green	Matthew North	150	7.5	N/A
Turnout			38.4	N/A
Liberal Democrats win (new seat)				
Liberal Democrats win (new seat)				

=== Brailes & Compton ===
Brailes & Compton
Party	Candidate	Votes	%	±%
Conservative	Sarah Whalley-Hoggins*	612	49.8	▼10.5
Liberal Democrats	Sarah Billins	520	42.4	▲20.5
Labour	Ronan Woods	96	7.8	▲1.8
Majority		92	7.4	▼31
Turnout		1,228	44.5	▲2
Conservative win				

In March 2025, Cllr Whalley-Hoggins defected to Reform UK.

=== Claverdon & Snitterfield ===
Claverdon & Snitterfield
Party	Candidate	Votes	%	±%
Green	Duncan Parker	753	62.1	N/A
Conservative	Peter Richards*	367	30.3	N/A
Liberal Democrats	Nina Knapman	93	7.7	N/A
Majority		386	31.8	N/A
Turnout		1,213	48.0	N/A
Green win (new seat)				

=== Gaydon, Kineton & Upper Lighthorne ===
Gaydon, Kineton & Upper Lighthorne (2 seats)
Party	Candidate	Votes	%	±%
Conservative	Chris Mills*	874	64.3	N/A
Conservative	Alan Scorer	683	50.3	N/A
Liberal Democrats	Toby Lee	259	19.1	N/A
Labour	Brian Thomas	256	18.8	N/A
Green	Rob Ballantyne	250	18.4	N/A
Green	Angela Webb	238	17.5	N/A
Liberal Democrats	Nick Solman	158	11.6	N/A
Turnout			34.5	N/A
Conservative win (new seat)				
Conservative win (new seat)				

=== Harbury ===
Harbury
Party	Candidate	Votes	%	±%
Liberal Democrats	Susan Ostrander	533	47.5	N/A
Independent	Jacqui Harris*	435	38.7	N/A
Labour	Linda Eastap	91	8.1	N/A
Reform	Chris Baddon	64	5.7	N/A
Majority		98	8.7	N/A
Turnout		1,123	42.9	N/A
Liberal Democrats win (new seat)				

=== Henley-in-Arden ===
Henley-in-Arden
Party	Candidate	Votes	%	±%
Liberal Democrats	Mike Rice	601	57.5	N/A
Conservative	India Tibbs	343	32.8	N/A
Labour	Bryn Turner	101	9.7	N/A
Majority		258	24.7	N/A
Turnout		1,045	40.7	N/A
Liberal Democrats win (new seat)				

=== Kinwarton ===
Kinwarton
Party	Candidate	Votes	%	±%
Liberal Democrats	Thom Holmes	739	56.6	N/A
Conservative	Lynda Harford	437	33.5	N/A
Labour	Kathrin Foster	88	6.7	N/A
Green	Rob Hardy	41	3.1	N/A
Majority		302	23.1	N/A
Turnout		1,305	43.6	N/A
Liberal Democrats win (new seat)				

=== Long Marston ===
Long Marston
Party	Candidate	Votes	%	±%
Liberal Democrats	John Keighley	505	58.38	N/A
Conservative	Richard Cox	223	25.78	N/A
Labour	Colin Parrott	92	10.64	N/A
Green	Helen Mitchell	45	5.2	N/A
Majority		282	32.60	N/A
Turnout		865	37.6	N/A
Liberal Democrats win (new seat)				

=== Quinton ===
Quinton
Party	Candidate	Votes	%	±%
Liberal Democrats	Dom Skinner	468	43.8	N/A
Conservative	Marilyn Bates	439	41.1	N/A
Green	Tom Venus	91	8.5	N/A
Labour	Jan Sewell	71	6.6	N/A
Majority		29	2.7	N/A
Turnout		1,069	36.7	N/A
Liberal Democrats win (new seat)				

=== Salford Priors & Alcester Rural ===
Salford Priors & Alcester Rural
Party	Candidate	Votes	%	±%
Conservative	Lauren Stanley	473	56.9	N/A
Liberal Democrats	Michael Watson	193	23.2	N/A
Labour	Tony O'Hagan	90	10.8	N/A
Green	Tom Genders	76	9.1	N/A
Majority		280	33.7	N/A
Turnout		832	34.4	N/A
Conservative win (new seat)				

=== Shipston North ===
Shipston North
Party	Candidate	Votes	%	±%
Green	Olivia Hatch	607	63.2	N/A
Conservative	Nicholas Turner	245	25.5	N/A
Liberal Democrats	Steve Albon	109	11.3	N/A
Majority		362	37.7	N/A
Turnout		961	38.6	N/A
Green win (new seat)				

=== Shipston South ===
Shipston South
Party	Candidate	Votes	%	±%
Green	Dave Passingham	634	58.2	N/A
Conservative	Jo Barker*	456	41.8	N/A
Majority		178	16.3	N/A
Turnout		1,090	44.0	N/A
Green win (new seat)				

=== Southam East, Central & Stockton ===
Southam East, Central & Stockton
Party	Candidate	Votes	%	±%
Conservative	Andy Crump*	573	64.7	N/A
Liberal Democrats	Chris Lambert	228	25.7	N/A
Green	David Watkin	85	9.6	N/A
Majority		345	39.0	N/A
Turnout		886	37.6	N/A
Conservative win (new seat)				

=== Southam North & Long Itchington ===
Southam North & Long Itchington
Party	Candidate	Votes	%	±%
Liberal Democrats	Louis Adam*	527	64.7	N/A
Conservative	Nikki Bell	179	22.0	N/A
Labour	John Hartigan	58	7.1	N/A
Green	Zoe James	50	6.1	N/A
Majority		348	42.7	N/A
Turnout		814	32.6	N/A
Liberal Democrats win (new seat)				

=== Southam South ===
Southam South
Party	Candidate	Votes	%	±%
Liberal Democrats	Gillian Padgham	323	47.1	N/A
Conservative	Richard Walters	282	41.1	N/A
Green	James Gordon-Cumming	81	11.8	N/A
Majority		41	6.0	N/A
Turnout		686	28.8	N/A
Liberal Democrats win (new seat)				

=== Southam West ===
Southam West
Party	Candidate	Votes	%	±%
Independent	Tony Bromwich*	534	69.7	N/A
Liberal Democrats	David Booth	150	19.6	N/A
Green	John Stott	82	10.7	N/A
Majority		384	50.1	N/A
Turnout		766	32.2	N/A
Independent win (new seat)				

=== Stratford Avenue ===
Stratford Avenue
Party	Candidate	Votes	%	±%
Liberal Democrats	Lorraine Grocott	353	41.9	N/A
Conservative	Tim Sinclair	276	32.7	N/A
Green	Sherron Guise	166	19.7	N/A
Labour	Dan Wilkinson	48	5.7	N/A
Majority		77	9.2	N/A
Turnout		843	33.9	N/A
Liberal Democrats win (new seat)				

=== Stratford Bishopton ===
Stratford Bishopton
Party	Candidate	Votes	%	±%
Liberal Democrats	Victoria Alcock*	549	57.3	N/A
Conservative	Jane Meehan	267	27.9	N/A
Labour	Bob Malloy	75	7.8	N/A
Green	John Riley	67	7.0	N/A
Majority		282	29.4	N/A
Turnout		958	39.5	N/A
Liberal Democrats win (new seat)				

=== Stratford Clopton ===
Stratford Clopton
Party	Candidate	Votes	%	±%
Liberal Democrats	Letty Petrovic	512	50.0	N/A
Labour	Jason Fojtik*	315	30.7	N/A
Conservative	Juliet Short	198	19.3	N/A
Majority		197	19.3	N/A
Turnout		1,025	40.0	N/A
Liberal Democrats win (new seat)				

=== Stratford Guildhall & Bridgetown ===
Stratford Guildhall & Bridgetown
Party	Candidate	Votes	%	±%
Liberal Democrats	Jenny Fradgley*	860	68.3	N/A
Conservative	Tony Dixon	262	20.8	N/A
Labour	Charlie Roe	85	6.7	N/A
Green	Stephen Michaux	52	4.1	N/A
Majority		598	47.5	N/A
Turnout		1,259	45.8	N/A
Liberal Democrats win (new seat)				

=== Stratford Hathaway ===
Stratford Hathaway
Party	Candidate	Votes	%	±%
Liberal Democrats	Liz Coles	330	47.1	N/A
Labour Co-op	Lee Rhodes	225	32.1	N/A
Conservative	Gill Forman*	102	14.6	N/A
Green	Peter Pettifor	44	6.3	N/A
Majority		105	15.0	N/A
Turnout		701	32.3	N/A
Liberal Democrats win (new seat)				

=== Stratford Orchard Hill ===
Stratford Orchard Hill
Party	Candidate	Votes	%	±%
Liberal Democrats	Ian Fradgley*	722	53.3	N/A
Conservative	Krish Rengaraju	350	25.8	N/A
Labour Co-op	Jacob Hill	210	15.5	N/A
Green	Matt Rickett	73	5.4	N/A
Majority		372	27.5	N/A
Turnout		1,355	46.2	N/A
Liberal Democrats win (new seat)				

=== Stratford Shottery ===
Stratford Shottery
Party	Candidate	Votes	%	±%
Liberal Democrats	David Curtis*	863	63.4	N/A
Conservative	Matthew Jennings	313	23.0	N/A
Labour	Sally Bigwood	93	6.8	N/A
Green	Vince Herbert	92	6.7	N/A
Majority		550	40.4	N/A
Turnout		1,361	47.1	N/A
Liberal Democrats win (new seat)				

=== Stratford Tiddington ===
Stratford Tiddington
Party	Candidate	Votes	%	±%
Liberal Democrats	Kate Rolfe*	784	73.1	N/A
Conservative	Amelia Tibbs	195	18.2	N/A
Labour	Helen Cooper	59	5.5	N/A
Green	Anthony Dennis	35	3.3	N/A
Majority		589	54.9	N/A
Turnout		1,073	46.7	N/A
Liberal Democrats win (new seat)				

=== Stratford Welcombe ===
Stratford Welcombe
Party	Candidate	Votes	%	±%
Liberal Democrats	Roger Harding	726	57.9	N/A
Conservative	Tony Jefferson*	437	34.8	N/A
Labour Co-op	Alastair Nealon	92	7.3	N/A
Majority		289	23.1	N/A
Turnout		1,255	45.19	N/A
Liberal Democrats win (new seat)				

=== Studley North ===
Studley North
Party	Candidate	Votes	%	±%
Liberal Democrats	Peter Hencher-Serafin*	358	45.7	N/A
Conservative	Justin Kerridge	304	38.8	N/A
Labour	Wayne Bates	82	10.5	N/A
Green	Anne Waldon	40	5.1	N/A
Majority		54	6.9	N/A
Turnout		784	33.0	N/A
Liberal Democrats win (new seat)				

=== Studley South ===
Studley South
Party	Candidate	Votes	%	±%
Liberal Democrats	Neil Edden*	505	53.8	N/A
Conservative	Jed McCrory	288	30.7	N/A
Labour	Alison Leask	89	9.5	N/A
Green	Dom Giles	56	6.0	N/A
Majority		217	23.1	N/A
Turnout		934	34.2	N/A
Liberal Democrats win (new seat)				

=== Tanworth-in-Arden ===
Tanworth-in-Arden
Party	Candidate	Votes	%	±%
Conservative	Lynda Organ	558	67.8	N/A
Liberal Democrats	Karyl Rees	121	14.7	N/A
Green	Lil Johnston	77	9.4	N/A
Labour	Bob Williams	67	8.1	N/A
Majority		437	53.1	N/A
Turnout		823	31.3	N/A
Conservative win (new seat)				

=== Tredington ===
Tredington
Party	Candidate	Votes	%	±%
Conservative	Trevor Harvey*	537	44.8	N/A
Liberal Democrats	Andy Fincham	499	41.6	N/A
Green	Mike Wakeford	94	7.8	N/A
Labour	Sue Redman	69	6.8	N/A
Majority		38	3.2	N/A
Turnout		1,199	44.9	N/A
Conservative win (new seat)				

=== Tysoe ===
Tysoe
Party	Candidate	Votes	%	±%
Conservative	Malcolm Littlewood	628	55.1	N/A
Liberal Democrats	Lynn Bowring	262	23.0	N/A
Green	Allison Aves	129	11.3	N/A
Labour	Ann Holland	121	10.6	N/A
Majority		366	32.1	N/A
Turnout		1,140	42.4	N/A
Conservative win (new seat)				

=== Welford-on-Avon ===
Welford-on-Avon
Party	Candidate	Votes	%	±%
Liberal Democrats	Manuela Perteghella*	928	73.5	N/A
Conservative	Annabel Wade	267	21.2	N/A
Labour	Eden Kaye	40	3.2	N/A
Green	Sally Evans	27	2.1	N/A
Majority		661	52.3	N/A
Turnout		1,262	49.3	N/A
Liberal Democrats win (new seat)				

=== Wellesbourne East & Rural ===
Wellesbourne East & Rural
Party	Candidate	Votes	%	±%
Liberal Democrats	David Johnston	560	52.1	N/A
Conservative	Barnaby Briggs	383	35.7	N/A
Labour	Simon Penson	74	6.9	N/A
Green	Mike Mordue	57	5.3	N/A
Majority		177	16.4	N/A
Turnout		1,074	40.6	N/A
Liberal Democrats win (new seat)				

=== Wellesbourne North & Rural ===
Wellesbourne North & Rural
Party	Candidate	Votes	%	±%
Conservative	Anne Parry*	581	46.3	N/A
Liberal Democrats	Kevin Brown	502	40.0	N/A
Labour	Angelique Campbell	114	9.1	N/A
Green	Jess Venus	58	4.6	N/A
Majority		79	6.3	N/A
Turnout		1,255	42.5	N/A
Conservative win (new seat)				

=== Wellesbourne South ===
Wellesbourne South
Party	Candidate	Votes	%	±%
Liberal Democrats	George Cowcher	555	52.9	N/A
Conservative	Danny Kendall*	379	36.1	N/A
Labour	Julie Fewins	74	7.1	N/A
Green	Rebecca Sanders	41	3.9	N/A
Majority		176	16.8	N/A
Turnout		1,049	42.6	N/A
Liberal Democrats win (new seat)				

=== Wootton Wawen ===
Wootton Wawen
Party	Candidate	Votes	%	±%
Conservative	Ian Shenton*	683	64.5	N/A
Liberal Democrats	Dani Hunter	207	19.6	N/A
Green	Chris Duffin	92	8.7	N/A
Labour	Ted Spicer	77	7.3	N/A
Majority		476	45.0	N/A
Turnout		1,059	36.0	N/A
Conservative win (new seat)				

== Changes 2023–2027 ==
- In March 2025, Sarah Whalley-Hoggins, the Conservative group leader on the council, defected to Reform UK, becoming the party's first district councillor. She represented the Brailes & Compton ward and had led the Conservative group since 2023.

=== By-elections ===
==== Alcester West ====
Alcester West by-election: 1 May 2025
Party	Candidate	Votes	%	±%
Liberal Democrats	Tom Ballinger	403	32.9	–7.6
Reform	Ashley Jones	278	22.7	N/A
Conservative	Emma Daniell	265	21.7	–4.5
Labour	Andrew Foster	241	19.7	–11.0
Green	John Stott	37	3.0	+0.4
Majority		125	10.2	+0.4
Turnout		1,224	44.8	–1.7
Liberal Democrats hold				

The by-election was triggered by the resignation of Liberal Democrat councillor Joe Harmer, who had held the seat since 2023.

==== Welford-on-Avon ====
Welford-on-Avon by-election: 1 May 2025
Party	Candidate	Votes	%	±%
Liberal Democrats	Cliff Brown	485	45.5	–28.0
Reform	Neil Lawrence	330	31.0	N/A
Conservative	Christian Reeve	190	17.8	–3.4
Green	Penny Stott	32	3.0	+0.9
Labour	John Hartigan	29	2.7	–0.5
Majority		155	14.5	–37.8
Turnout		1,069	41.6	–7.7
Liberal Democrats hold				

The by-election was triggered by the resignation of Liberal Democrat councillor Manuela Perteghella, the sitting MP for Stratford-on-Avon, who had held the seat since 2020.

==== Quinton ====
Quinton by-election: 20 November 2025
Party	Candidate	Votes	%	±%
Liberal Democrats	Paul Harrison	437	47.3	+3.5
Reform	Sean Edmunds	306	33.1	N/A
Conservative	Sarah Hession	137	14.8	−26.3
Green	Penny Stott	35	3.8	−4.7
Labour	John Hartigan	9	1.0	−5.6
Turnout		925	30.41	−6.32
Registered electors		3,042		
Liberal Democrats hold		Swing		

The by-election was triggered by the resignation of Liberal Democrat councillor Dominic Skinner.

==== Salford Priors & Alcester Rural ====
Salford Priors & Alcester Rural by-election: 20 November 2025
Party	Candidate	Votes	%	±%
Reform	Ashley Jones	272	33.3	N/A
Liberal Democrats	Huw Lewis	269	32.9	+9.7
Conservative	Justin Kerridge	227	27.8	−23.6
Green	Tom Genders	31	3.8	−5.3
Labour	Julie Fewins	18	2.2	−8.6
Turnout		817	33.0	−1.36
Registered electors		2,476		
Reform gain from Conservative		Swing		

The by-election was triggered by the resignation of Conservative councillor Lauren Stanley.

==== Bishops Itchington, Fenny Compton and Napton ====
Bishops Itchington, Fenny Compton and Napton by-election: 7 May 2026
Party	Candidate	Votes	%	±%
Liberal Democrats	Jake Beavan	1,104	38.1	−11.6
Reform	Jacqui Harris	751	25.9	N/A
Conservative	Christian Francis Reeve	715	24.7	−17.9
Green	Julie Ann Folkes-Skinner	273	9.4	+0.0
Labour	Jacob David Simon Hill	53	1.8	−8.2
Majority		353	12.2	+5.1
Turnout		2,899	49.4	+11.0
Registered electors		5,868		
Liberal Democrats hold		Swing		

The by-election was triggered by the resignation of Liberal Democrat councillor Nigel Rock.

==== Kinwarton ====
Kinwarton by-election: 9 July 2026
Party	Candidate	Votes	%	±%
Conservative	Janine Lee	507	36.4	+2.9
Liberal Democrats	Tina Ballinger	500	35.9	−20.8
Reform	Rachael Chadwick-Harrison	231	16.6	N/A
Green	Lizzee Leedham	128	9.2	+6.0
Labour	Andrew Foster	28	2.0	−4.7
Majority		7	0.5	N/A
Turnout		1,394	45.1	+1.4
Registered electors		3,094		
Conservative gain from Liberal Democrats		Swing	▲11.9	

The by-election was triggered by the resignation of Liberal Democrat councillor Thom Holmes, who moved to Australia.
