= Sherbourne, Warwickshire =

Village in Warwickshire, England

Coordinates: 52.249448°N 1.617563°W

Sherbourne
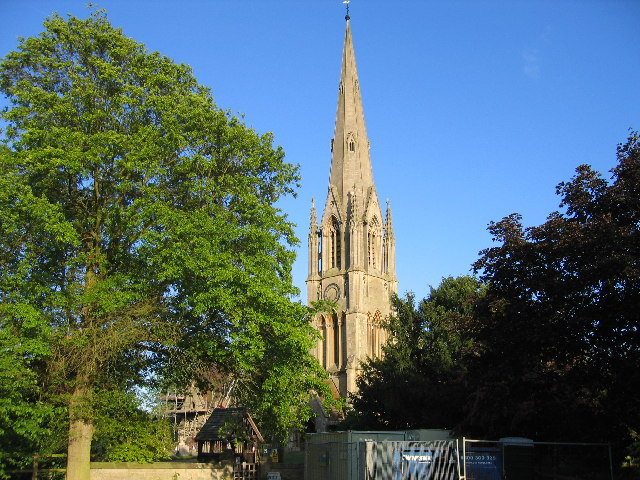
- All Saints Church

- Location within Warwickshire
- Population: 174 (2011)
- OS grid reference: SP262613
- Civil parish: Sherbourne
- District: Warwick
- Shire county: Warwickshire
- Region: West Midlands
- Country: England
- Sovereign state: United Kingdom
- Post town: WARWICK
- Postcode district: CV35
- UK Parliament: Kenilworth and Southam

Sherbourne is a village and civil parish in the Warwick district of Warwickshire, England. The population of the civil parish at the 2011 Census was 174.

== Geography and administration ==
Sherbourne is 3 miles south of the county town Warwick and also borders Barford, Fulbrook, Snitterfield, Norton Lindsey and Budbrooke. The village is administered jointly with Barford and Wasperton, and as part of Warwick District.

== Landmarks ==
Sherbourne's Victorian Gothic church (All Saints) is a Grade II* Listed building, designed by Sir George Gilbert Scott, an eminent Victorian architect. The first stone was laid in August 1862, and the church was consecrated on 29 September 1864. Church contains a memorial plaque to Maudsley of the Dambusters Raid. The church was commissioned by Louisa Ryland.
