= Combrook =

Village in Warwickshire, England

Coordinates: 52°09′N 1°33′W

Combrook (also spelt Combroke and - more rarely - Combrooke) is a small village of about 65 houses in rural Warwickshire, located near the junction of the Fosse Way (B4455 road), and the B4086 road between the villages of Wellesbourne and Kineton. The population taken at the 2011 census was 159.

== History ==
Its history is closely linked with that of the nearby Compton Verney estate, for which it once served as the estate village, providing living accommodation for a number of the servants. The village dates from at least the time of Henry I, circa 1086, when a small medieval church was built in the village. There is, however, no separate reference to it in the Domesday Book. By 1279, following a stocktaking by Edward I known as the Hundred Rolls, Combrook was identified as located in the Kineton hundred. It remained part of the Kineton parish until 1858, when it was separated from Kineton and united with the ecclesiastical parish of Compton Verney.

A number of the buildings in the village have a similar style, most easily seen in the church. The original church was modified in Tudor times, with the chancel being rebuilt again in 1831. The present building was erected in 1866, to a design by John Gibson, paid for by the Dowager Lady Margaret Willoughby de Brook of Compton Verney, keeping the existing chancel. John Gibson went on to design the Victorian neo-Elizabethan estate houses and the horse drinking troughs in the village in the same style as that of the church. A number of the other houses in the village are thatched, with clear signs of original thatched roofs visible on several other dwellings. Until the sale of the Compton Verney estate in 1929, Combrook was a "closed" village, entirely owned by the Lord of the manor, who could determine who lived there, and Combrook today is still considered to be one of the best-preserved estate villages in the country.

The largest house in Combrook once served as the school, and there has been a school on the site since at least 1641. The building which now serves as the village hall was built as the village school in 1855, and seems to have served as a design template for John Gibson's style for the church and estate houses. The village school was closed in 1966.

== Etymology ==
The name "Combrook" derive from the words "cum" meaning valley, and "broc(e)" meaning brook, and simply refers to its location in a valley beside a brook. The name is variously presented as "Combroke" (on the road signs at entry to the village, and for official purposes by Stratford-on-Avon District Council), or "Combrook" (as used by Warwickshire County Highways Department and the Royal Mail), or even "Combrooke", as used by Severn Trent Water. Historical variations have included Cumbroc and Combroce (13th century rolls), Cumbrok (Dugdale 1656), Combebrooke (1658 church flagon) and Cumbroke (1817 map).
