= Langley, Warwickshire =

Coordinates: 52.267471°N 1.7230859°W

Langley
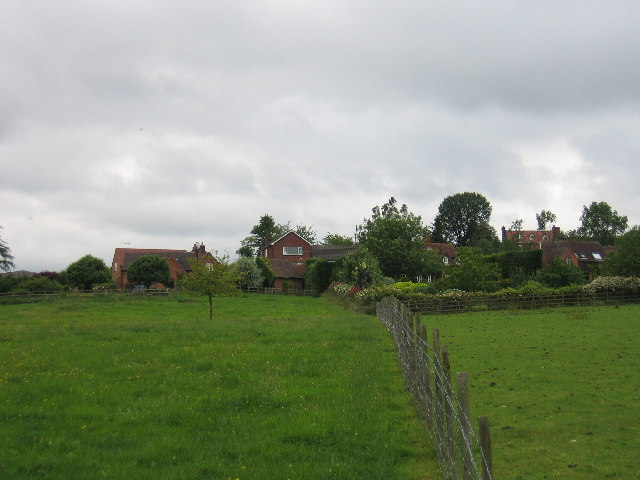

- Location within Warwickshire
- Area: 4.17 km^{2} (1.61 sq mi)
- Population: 162 (2011 census)
  - Density: 39/km^{2} (100/sq mi)
- Civil parish: Langley
- District: Stratford-on-Avon
- Shire county: Warwickshire
- Region: West Midlands
- Country: England
- Sovereign state: United Kingdom
- Police: Warwickshire
- Fire: Warwickshire
- Ambulance: West Midlands

Langley is a village and civil parish in the Stratford-on-Avon district of Warwickshire, England. The village is about 6 miles (10 km) west from the county town of Warwick. In 2011 the parish had a population of 162. The parish touches Bearley Claverdon, Snitterfield, Wolverton and Wootton Wawen.

== History ==
The name "Langley" means 'Long wood/clearing'. Langley was recorded in the Domesday Book as Longelei. Langley was a township in the parish of Claverdon, it became a separate parish in 1866.

== Landmarks ==
There are 8 listed buildings in Langley. Langley has a parish church called St Mary's, which is part of the Arden Valley Group of Churches in the Diocese of Coventry.
