= Barcheston =

Village in Warwickshire, England

Coordinates: 52°02′N 1°36′W

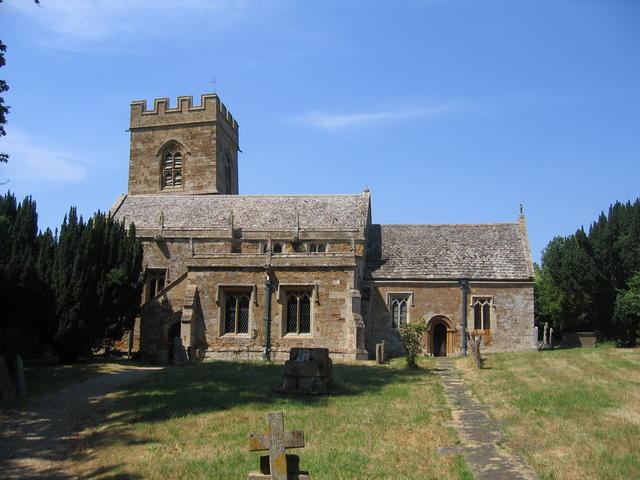
Barcheston church, which has a leaning tower

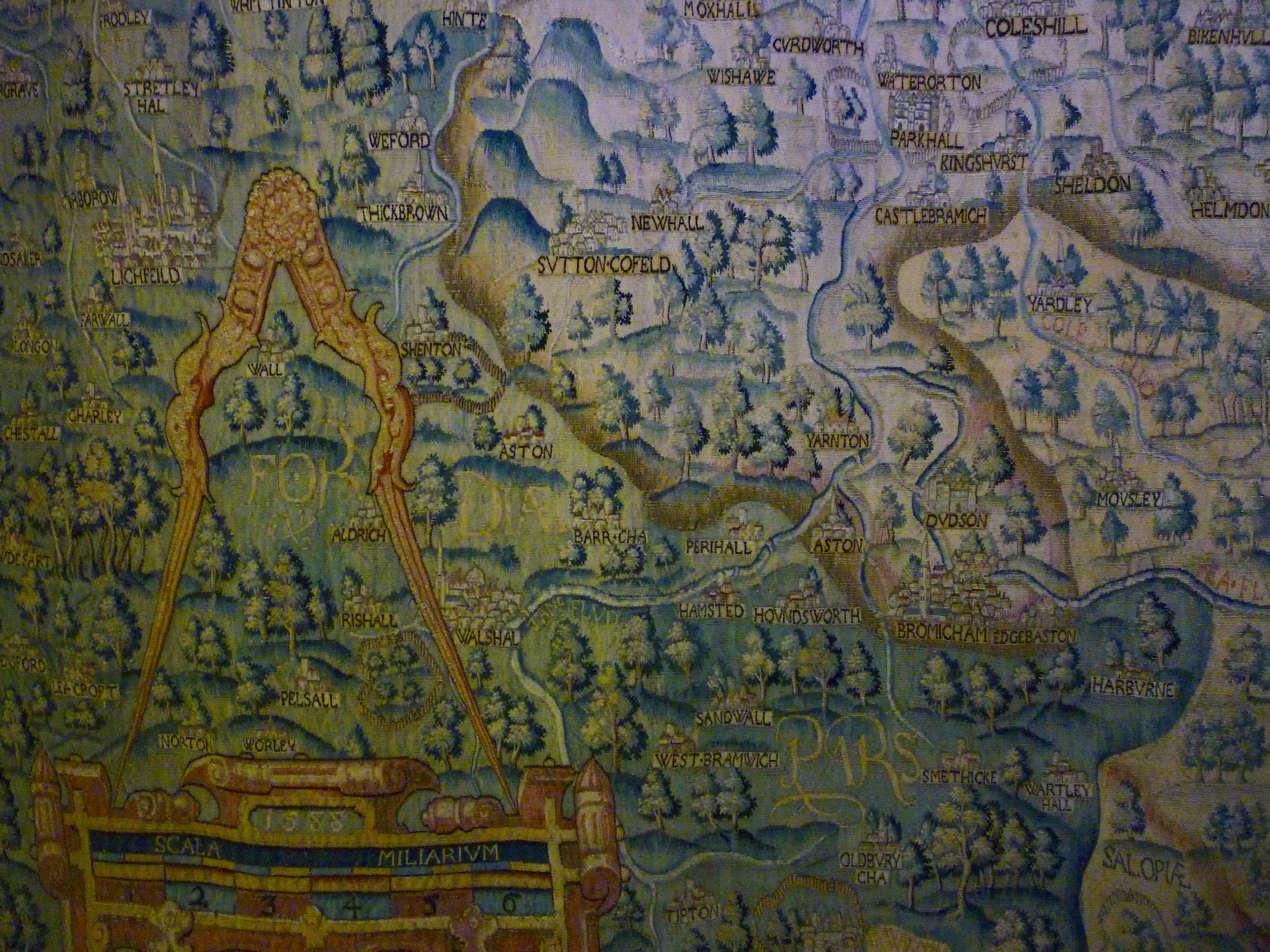
Detail of Sheldon tapestry of Warwickshire

Barcheston is a village and civil parish in the Stratford-on-Avon district of Warwickshire, England. The village is on the east bank of the River Stour, opposite Shipston-on-Stour. It shares a parish council with Willington. The parish, administered at its lowest level by the Barcheston and Willington Parish Meeting, is in the Ettington ward of the district council. According to the 2001 Census the parishes population was 134, increasing to 141 at the 2011 Census.

Ralph Ardern inherited the manor of Barcheston between 1382 (the death of his father, Henry de Ardern) and 1408 (the death of his mother). Whether or not he was ever resident is unknown. In his will proved in 1571 William Sheldon outlined a detailed plan to establish a weaving enterprise, including both cloth fabrics and English tapestry The majority of the items, known as Sheldon tapestries only from the 1920s on shaky evidence, are small pieces, measuring no more than 48 x 46 cms (19 x 18.5 inches) and were based on Flemish prints. Even the largest, the set of four tapestry maps of English counties were no more than 4 metres high An outline of Barcheston's history can be found in the Victoria County History, Warwickshire.

== See also ==
- Mortlake Tapestry Works
