= Pillerton Priors =

Coordinates: 52.126221°N 1.5744745°W

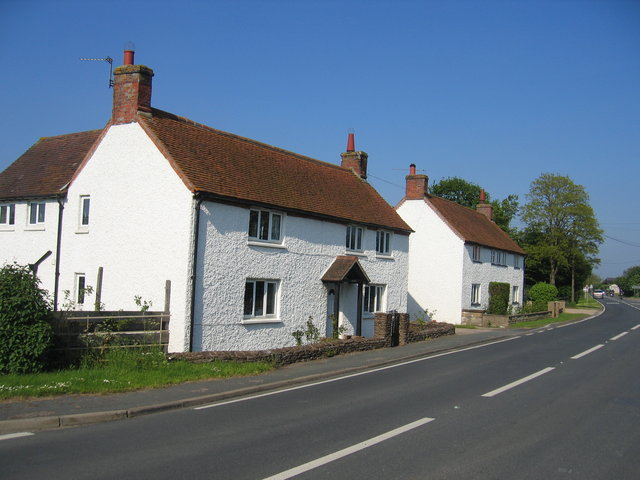

- Location within Warwickshire
- Area: 6.28 km^{2} (2.42 sq mi)
- Population: 294 (2011 census)
  - Density: 47/km^{2} (120/sq mi)
- Civil parish: Pillerton Priors
- District: Stratford-on-Avon
- Shire county: Warwickshire
- Region: West Midlands
- Country: England
- Sovereign state: United Kingdom
- Police: Warwickshire
- Fire: Warwickshire
- Ambulance: West Midlands
- Website: http://www.pillertonpriors.com/index.html

Pillerton Priors or Over Pillerton is a settlement and civil parish 11 miles (18 km) south of Warwick, in the Stratford-on-Avon district, in the county of Warwickshire, England. In 2011 the parish had a population of 294. The parish touches Ettington, Oxhill and Pillerton Hersey. Pillerton Priors and Pillerton Hersey are jointly known as "The Pillertons".

== Features ==
There are 6 listed buildings in Pillerton Priors. Pillerton Priors once had a church called St Mary Magdalen's; the graveyard still exists but there are no remains of the church. Pillerton Priors has a village hall.

== History ==
The name "Pillerton" means 'Farm/settlement connected with Pilheard'. The "Priors" part from the fact that the Manor was held by the Abbot of Evroult in 1086 of Hugh de Grentemaisnil or Grandmesnil. Pillerton Priors was recorded in the Domesday Book as Pilardetune. There are medieval boundary ditches around the village of Pillerton Priors which possibly show the extent of the medieval village.
