= River Stour, Warwickshire =

River in Oxfordshire and Warwickshire, England

River Stour
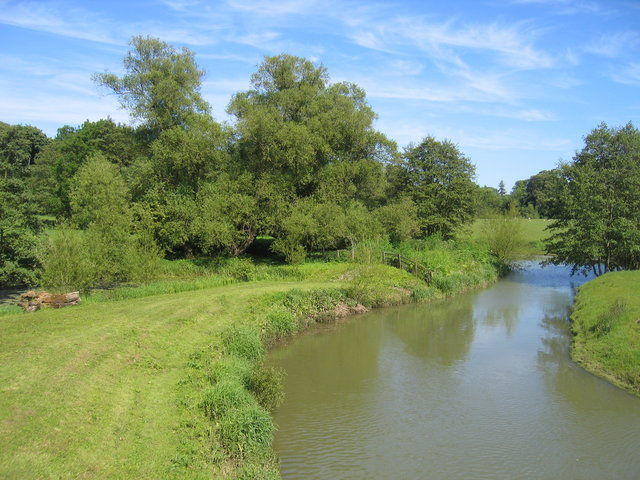
- The Stour near Ettington Park

Location
- Country: England
- Counties: Warwickshire, Oxfordshire

Physical characteristics
- Source
  - location: Close to Swalcliffe, Oxfordshire
- Mouth: Avon
  - location: Stratford-upon-Avon
  - coordinates: 52°10′40″N 1°43′53″W

The River Stour rises in the county of Oxfordshire and largely flows through Warwickshire in England. It is a tributary of the Avon, which it joins just south west of Stratford-upon-Avon. It gives its name to the town of Shipston-on-Stour.

The source of the River Stour is a spring near Highways Farm, just south of Swalcliffe. Some 3 kilometres (1.9 mi) to the west, it crosses the Oxfordshire/Warwickshire border near Traitor's Ford. The first settlement that the river flows through is the village of Stourton. The River Stour then turns to the north and passes through the town of Shipston-on-Stour. The A3400 road roughly follows the course of the river to Stratford-upon-Avon, through the villages of Tredington Halford, Alderminster, Newbold-on-Stour, Preston-on-Stour, Atherstone-on-Stour and Clifford Chambers.

== See also ==
- Rivers of the United Kingdom
