= Stourton, Warwickshire =

Coordinates: 52.03°N 1.58°W

Stourton
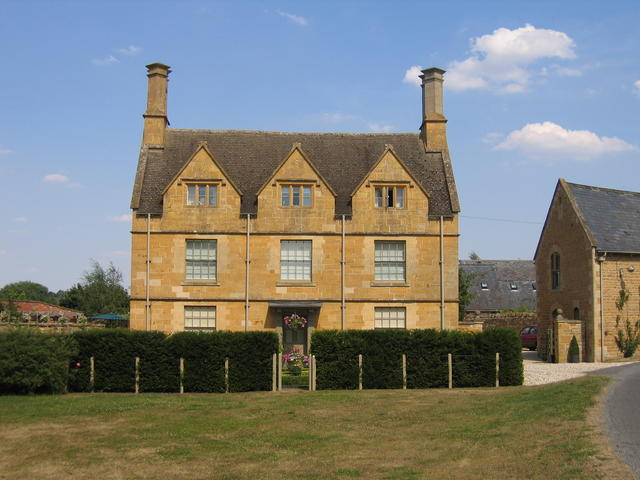

- Location within Warwickshire
- Population: 159 (2011)
- OS grid reference: SP2936
- Civil parish: Stourton
- District: Stratford-on-Avon
- Shire county: Warwickshire
- Region: West Midlands
- Country: England
- Sovereign state: United Kingdom
- Post town: Shipston-on-Stour
- Postcode district: CV36
- Police: Warwickshire
- Fire: Warwickshire
- Ambulance: West Midlands
- UK Parliament: Stratford-on-Avon
- Website: Cherington, Stourton & Sutton-under-Brailes

Stourton is a village and civil parish beside the River Stour about 3 miles (5 km) southeast of Shipston-on-Stour. The population taken at the 2011 census was 159. Stourton is contiguous with the larger village of Cherington.
