= Fulbrook, Warwickshire =

English parish and deserted village

Coordinates: 52.242°N 1.644°W

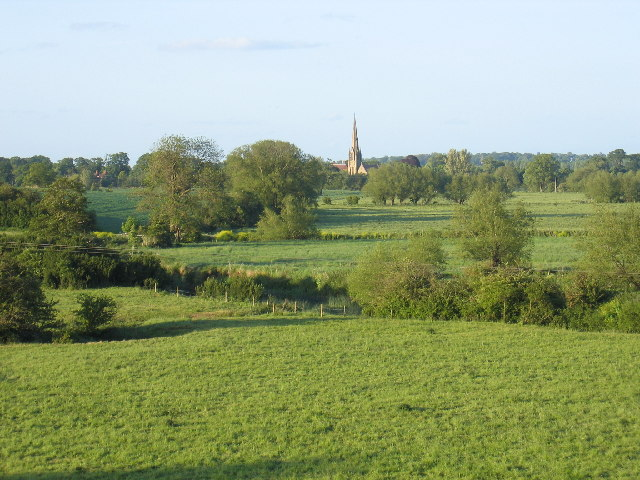
All Saints Church in Sherbourne, seen from Fulbook across the River Avon

Fulbrook is a small parish and deserted village in Warwickshire, England, situated about 4 miles (6 km) north-east of Stratford upon Avon. Population details can be found under Hampton Lucy.

Fulbrook today consists mostly of sheep-grazed fields on the banks of the River Avon. Ridge and furrow marks on the bank just down from the road are almost all that remains of medieval strip fields that once supported a village upon the site. Fulbrook was one of many villages first decimated by the Black Death in the 14th century, but doubly unfortunate in that its remaining tenants were later forcibly evicted by the Duke of Bedford so that he could enclose it as a park for hunting (nearby Charlecote remains a deer park).

There are documented reports of a dramatic rise in highway crime on the surrounding roads soon after the eviction of the villagers. The Duke of Bedford also built a castle on the site near a moated house belonging to a widow of noble birth, the moat of which is still clearly visible. Local records tell of fierce rivalry between, on the one side, the Duke of Bedford and the noble widow and, on the other, the Earl of Warwick: conflict which on occasions descended into violence between supporters of the two sides in the town of Warwick.

There was once also a watermill, owned by an order of nuns from Coventry, and there are records of graves found on the site. Later excavations have destroyed almost all traces of the village.
