= River Itchen, Warwickshire =

River in east Warwickshire, England

Itchen
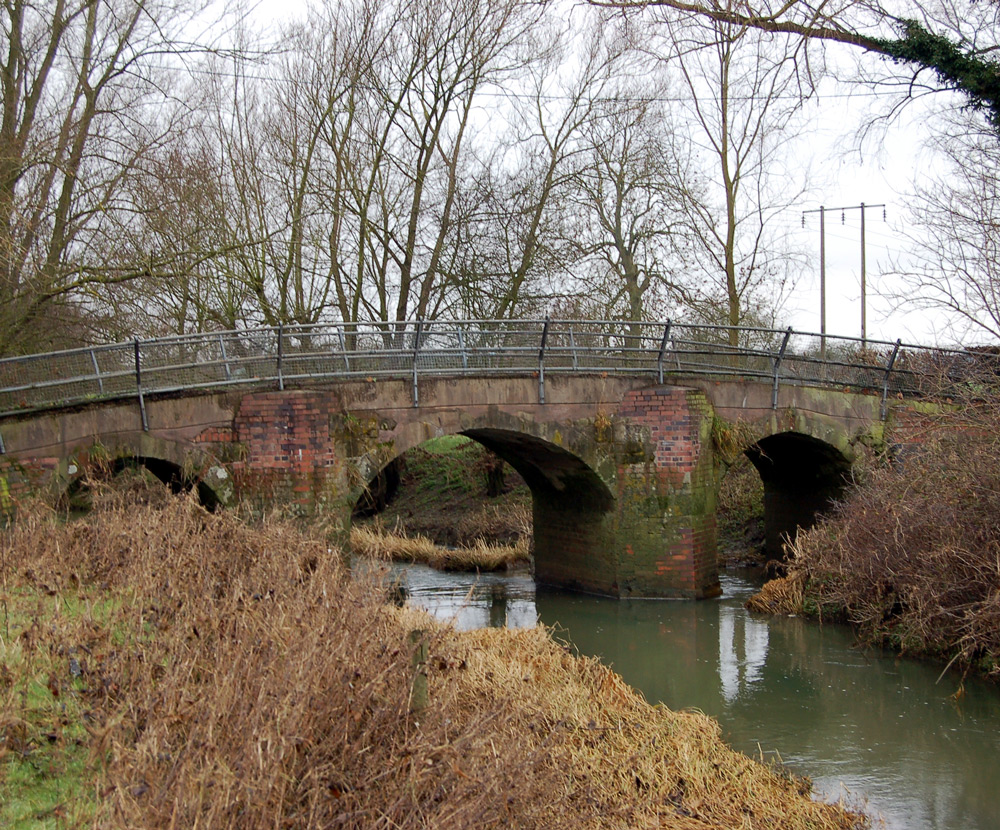
- Bridge carrying a minor road over the River Itchen near Long Itchington

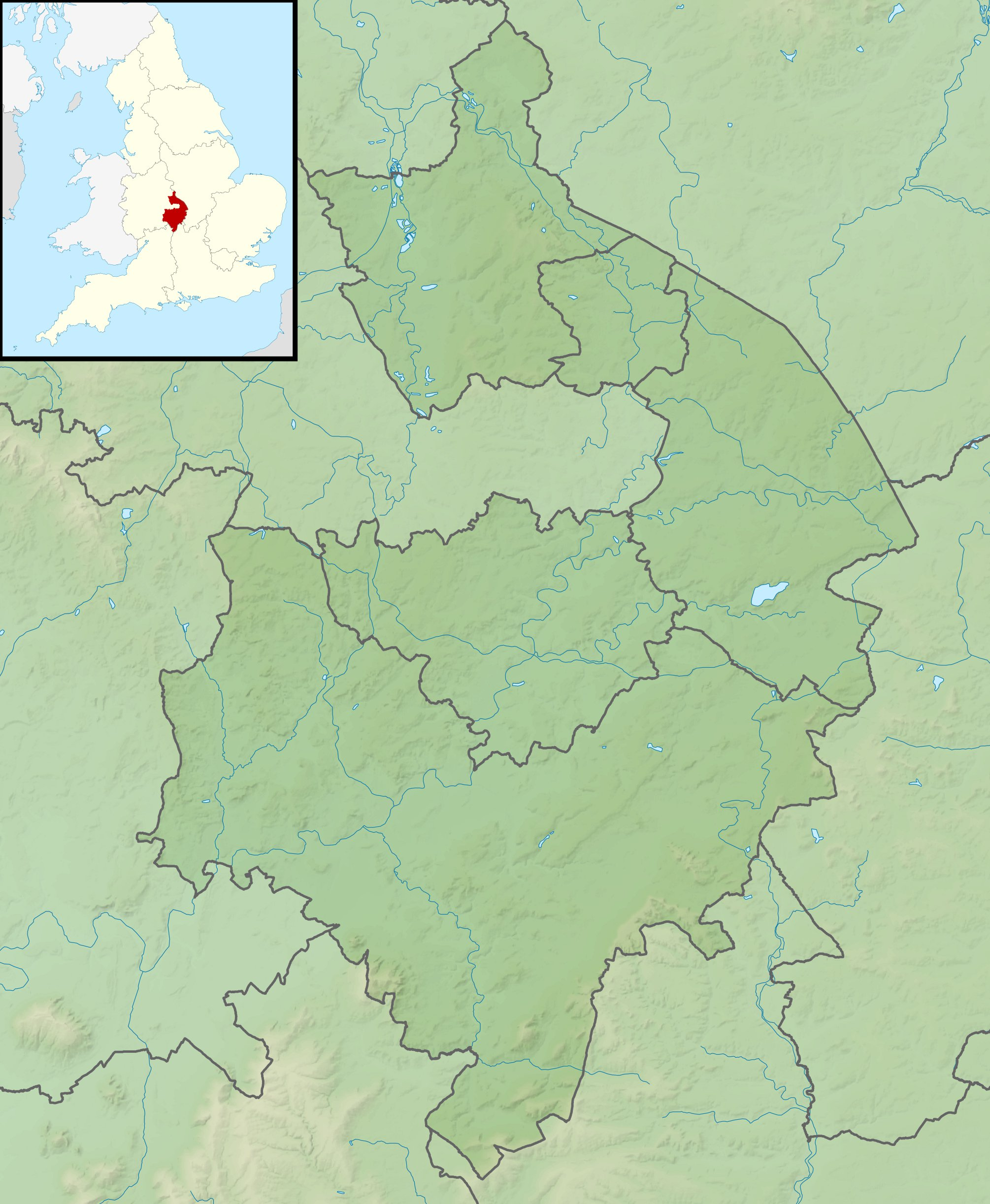
- Location of the mouth within Warwickshire

Location
- Country: England
- Region: Warwickshire

Physical characteristics
- Source: Wormleighton
  - location: 52.1839°N 1.34724°W
  - elevation: 150 m (490 ft)
- Mouth: River Leam
  - coordinates: 52.31797°N 1.4066°W
  - elevation: 63 m (207 ft)
- Length: 28.7 km (17.8 mi)

The River Itchen flows through east Warwickshire in England. It is a small river, about 18 miles (29 km) long, and its general course is from south to north.

== Course ==
The River Itchen rises near Wormleighton at grid reference SP 447 541 and flows into a broad valley to the northeast of a range of ironstone hills which border Warwickshire and Northamptonshire. Shortly after beginning its course it runs under the Oxford Canal. The infant river is fed by several small brooks and skirts the village of Bishop's Itchington (to which it gives its name) before passing below the former Great Western Railway London to Birmingham railway (now operated by Chiltern Trains).

A mile-and-a-half north of Bishops Itchington, the River Itchen passes under Deppers Bridge which gives its name to the neighbouring hamlet. A mile further on it passes under the A425 main road west of the town of Southam. Immediately after the bridge, it flows through Stoneythorpe Park and passes the hamlet of Bascote. A mile north of Bascote, the Grand Union Canal crosses the Itchen valley on a half-mile-long embankment, and is carried over the river on an aqueduct.

The River Itchen reaches the large village of Long Itchington (again named from the river) and passes close to the church. West of the village, the river swings to the west briefly and its meandering course is bridged twice by the course of the disused Leamington to Weedon railway line, now a footpath and cycleway.

The River Itchen turns north again and three miles (5 km) further on it reaches Marton where it flows into the River Leam at grid reference SP405690.

== History ==
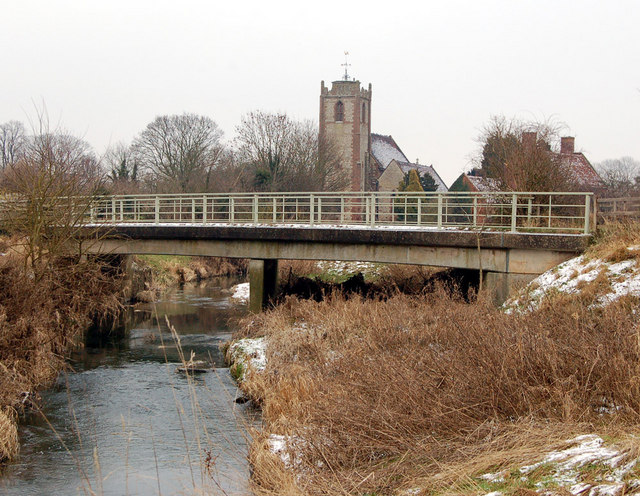
Itchen at Long Itchington, with Holy Trinity Church in the background

In 2009 thousands of fish were killed in the River Itchen when poisonous chemicals washed off neighbouring farmland. Later in the year 3500 roach, dace and chub were released into the river to help to replenish stocks.

A section of the river is designated as a Site of Special Scientific Interest, as it "played a significant role in the development of the theory of underfit streams that related change in stream activity to postglacial climatic change and reduced discharges."

== Water quality ==
The Environment Agency measure water quality of the river systems in England. Each is given an overall ecological status, which may be one of five levels: high, good, moderate, poor and bad. There are several components that are used to determine this, including biological status, which looks at the quantity and varieties of invertebrates, angiosperms and fish. Chemical status, which compares the concentrations of various chemicals against known safe concentrations, is rated good or fail.

Water quality of the River Itchen in 2019:

Section	Ecological Status	Chemical Status	Overall Status	Length	Catchment	Channel
Itchen - source to conf with R Stowe	Moderate	Fail	Moderate	21.295 km (13.232 mi)	77.537 km^{2} (29.937 sq mi)	
Itchen - conf R Stowe to conf R Leam	Moderate	Fail	Moderate	13.431 km (8.346 mi)	21.263 km^{2} (8.210 sq mi)	
