= Willington, Warwickshire =

Coordinates: 52°03′12″N 1°36′54″W

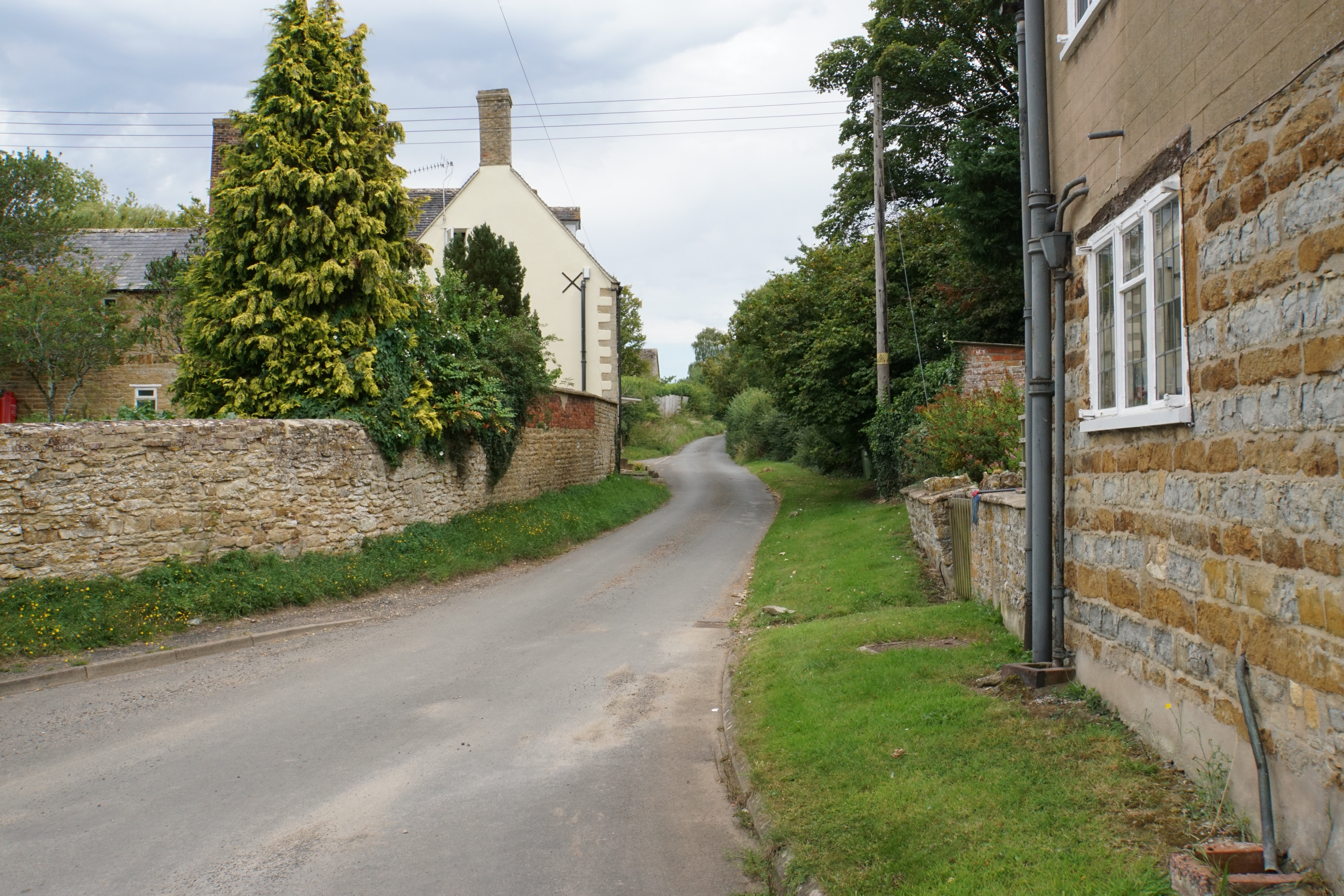
A lane in Willington

Willington is a village in Warwickshire, England. Population details are included within Barcheston. The origin of the place-name is from Old English tun (homestead or farm) of Wulfāf's (or Wīglāf's) people. It appears as Ullavintone in the Domesday Book, and as Wullavington in 1287.
