= Alderminster =

Village in Warwickshire, England

Coordinates: 52.13°N 01.66°W

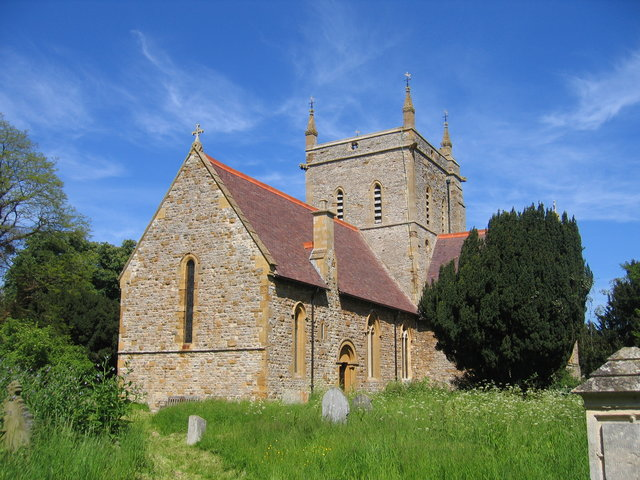
- St Mary & Holy Cross parish church

- Location within Warwickshire
- Population: 491 (2011 Census)
- OS grid reference: SP2348
- Civil parish: Alderminster
- District: Stratford-on-Avon
- Shire county: Warwickshire
- Region: West Midlands
- Country: England
- Sovereign state: United Kingdom
- Post town: Stratford-upon-Avon
- Postcode district: CV37
- Dialling code: 01789
- Police: Warwickshire
- Fire: Warwickshire
- Ambulance: West Midlands
- UK Parliament: Stratford-on-Avon
- Website: Alderminster Parish Council

Alderminster is a village and civil parish on the River Stour about 4 miles (6.4 km) south of Stratford-upon-Avon in Warwickshire, England. The village is on the A3400 road between Stratford-upon-Avon and Shipston-on-Stour. The 2011 Census recorded the parish's population as 491.

== History ==
Alderminster was an exclave of Worcestershire until 1931, when it was transferred to Warwickshire. When rural district councils were created in the 1890s, Alderminster was part of Shipston on Stour Rural District. When the parish was transferred to Warwickshire it became part of Stratford on Avon Rural District. The first mention of a post office in the village is in July 1849, when a type of postmark known as an undated circle was issued. The post office closed in 1973.

In the Domesday Book of 1086, Alderminster is shown as part of the land of St Mary's of Pershore, in Pershore Hundred, Worcestershire. In 1884 the village is shown on a map as consisting only of a few houses. The Minster and Parish Church of St Mary and the Holy Cross is of 12th-century origin. The church has been listed Grade II* since 1967. Alderminster was one of the film locations of MGM's 1963 horror film The Haunting.

Between 1963 and 1968, the village was the location of a Royal Observer Corps monitoring bunker, to be used in the event of a nuclear attack. It was subsequently demolished; no trace remains today.

== Sources ==
- Pevsner, Nikolaus; Wedgwood, Alexandra (1966). Warwickshire. The Buildings of England. Harmondsworth: Penguin Books. pp. 62–63.
- Willis-Bund, J.W.; Page, W.H., eds. (1924). A History of the County of Worcester. Victoria County History. Vol. 4. London: St Catherine Press. pp. 7–12.
