= Butlers Marston =

Village and civil parish in Warwickshire, England

Coordinates: 52.148°N 1.536°W

Butlers Marston is a village and civil parish on the River Dene in south-eastern Warwickshire, England. The village is part of Stratford-on-Avon district. In the 2001 census it had a population of 226, increasing to 232 in the 2011 Census. Butlers Marston is located one mile (1.6 km) south-west of Kineton and roughly four miles (6.4 km) south-east of Wellesbourne.

== History ==
The village originally lay to the east, beyond the church, but was evacuated after the Black Death in 1349. The church of St Peter and St Paul, though mainly Victorian, has a Norman arcade and a 17th-century aisle.

== Sources ==
- Warwickshire Towns & Villages, by Geoff Allen (2000) ISBN 1-85058-642-X
