= Ladbroke, Southam =

Village and civil parish in Warwickshire, England

Coordinates: 52.225°N 1.390°W

Ladbroke
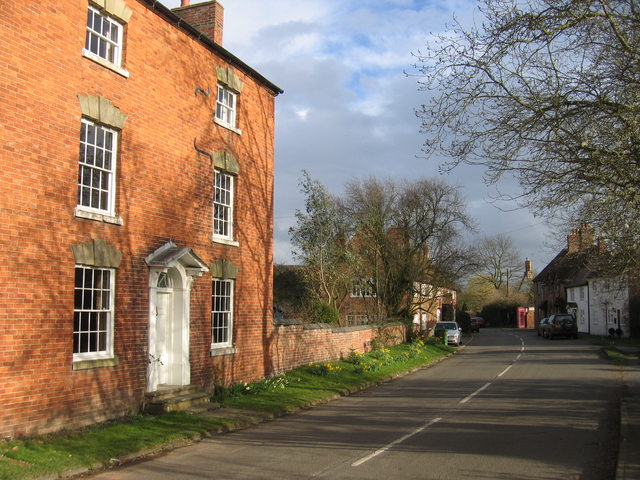
- Ladbroke main street

- Location within Warwickshire
- Population: 268 (2011 census)
- OS grid reference: SP4158
- Civil parish: Ladbroke
- District: Stratford-on-Avon
- Shire county: Warwickshire
- Region: West Midlands
- Country: England
- Sovereign state: United Kingdom
- Post town: Southam
- Postcode district: CV47
- Dialling code: 01926
- Police: Warwickshire
- Fire: Warwickshire
- Ambulance: West Midlands
- UK Parliament: Kenilworth and Southam
- Website: All Saints' Church, Ladbroke

Ladbroke is a village and civil parish about 2 miles (3.2 km) south of Southam in Warwickshire. The population of the civil parish at the 2001 Census was 273, reducing to 268 at the 2011 Census.

== Manor ==
The earliest known record of Ladbroke is from 998, when King Æthelred II granted lands at Southam, Ladbroke and Radbourne to Leofwine. Most of the common lands of Ladbroke parish had been enclosed by the end of the 16th century. Ladbroke Hall is a country house of seven bays and two storeys built late in the 17th century. In the 20th century Sir Nikolaus Pevsner called it "a standard house, but a very pleasing one". Ladbroke's gambling company was founded by Messrs. Schwind and Pennington in 1886, as commission agents for horses trained at the hall. The name Ladbrokes was adopted in 1902, when Arthur Bendir joined the partnership, and operations were moved to London.

== Parish church ==
The Church of England parish church of All Saints was built in the 13th century and completely rebuilt with the addition of Decorated Gothic three-bay north and south aisles and the west tower in the 14th century. Late in the 15th century the heights of the nave and chancel were raised and a Perpendicular Gothic clerestory added. In 1876 All Saints' was re-roofed and restored under the direction of Sir George Gilbert Scott. The bell tower has a ring of five bells, all cast by John Taylor & Co of Loughborough in 1873.

== Amenities ==
Ladbroke has a public house, the Bell Inn.

== Sources ==
- Pevsner, Nikolaus; Wedgwood, Alexandra (1974) [1966]. Warwickshire. The Buildings of England. Harmondsworth: Penguin Books. pp. 330–331.
- Salzman, Louis F., ed. (1951). A History of the County of Warwick, Volume 6: Knightlow hundred. Victoria County History. pp. 143–147.
