= Louis Francis Salzman =

British economic historian

Louis Francis Salzman CBE
- Born: 26 March 1878; Brighton
- Died: 4 April 1971 (aged 93); Lewes
- Education: Haileybury College
- Alma mater: Pembroke College, Cambridge
- Occupations: Economic historian, editor
- Known for: English local history
- Spouse: Maud Russell

Louis Francis Salzman CBE FSA (26 March 1878 – 4 April 1971) was a British economic historian who specialised in the medieval period.

== Life and career ==
He was born in Brighton in 1878, the son of Dr. F. W. Salzmann, and educated at Haileybury College and Pembroke College, Cambridge. He studied natural sciences, aiming to make a career in medicine; however, after inheriting a small private income, he gave this up to work in history.

He married Maud Russell in 1904, and had three sons and two daughters. He did not serve in the First World War, through ill-health; he taught at St George's School, Harpenden from 1916 to 1918. In 1918 he moved to Cambridge, and there tutored students. In 1934, his marriage to Maud was dissolved, and he moved to London, shortly thereafter moving to Lewes in Sussex, where he lived to his death.

His first book, The History of the Parish of Hailsham, was published in 1901. He then began his work in economic history, writing on Sussex industries for the Victoria County History. In 1913 he published English Industries of the Middle Ages, and in 1931 English Trade in the Middle Ages. The building industry had been omitted from English Industries, though it was touched on in an enlarged edition ten years later, and in 1952 he produced A Documentary History of Building in England Down to 1540, a comprehensive study of both the practical and organisational aspects of the industry. In 1934 Salzman succeeded W. H. Page as general editor of the Victoria County History. He held the post until 1949, overseeing the production of fifteen volumes, covering Oxfordshire and Warwickshire as well as Sussex, and was succeeded by Ralph Pugh.

Salzman's other academic works included biographies of Henry II (1914) and Edward I (1968), as well as the general studies English Life in the Middle Ages (1926), England in Tudor Times (1926), and A Survey of English History (1930). He wrote a pair of popular collections – Medieval Byways (1913) and More Medieval Byways (1926) – of short essays on individual topics, "cookery" or "memories", built around extracts from contemporary records and providing an insight into medieval life seen from an unusual angle. In 1926 he published a play, The Girdle of Venus.

In 1909 he became the honorary editor of the Sussex Archaeological Collections, the Sussex Archaeological Society's annual journal; he held the post for the next fifty years and was the first professional archaeologist or historian to edit the journal. He was president of the society from 1954 to 1956, and published a history of it in 1946. In 1955, he was appointed as a Commander of The Most Excellent Order of the British Empire, and in 1965 awarded an honorary doctorate by the University of Sussex.
