= Little Wolford =

Hamlet in Warwickshire, England

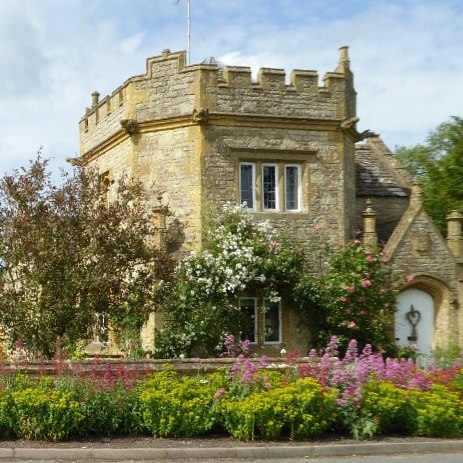
- Broadmoor Lodge, Little Wolford

- Location within Warwickshire
- OS grid reference: SP263354
  - London: 74 mi (119 km) SE
- Civil parish: Little Wolford
- District: Stratford-on-Avon
- Shire county: Warwickshire
- Region: West Midlands
- Country: England
- Sovereign state: United Kingdom
- Post town: Shipston-on-Stour
- Postcode district: CV36
- Dialling code: 01608
- Police: Warwickshire
- Fire: Warwickshire
- Ambulance: West Midlands
- UK Parliament: Stratford-on-Avon

Little Wolford is a hamlet and civil parish in the Stratford-on-Avon district of Warwickshire, England. With the neighbouring parish of Great Wolford it is part of 'The Wolfords'. Little Wolford is significant for its Grade II* listed 15th- to 16th-century Little Wolford Manor.

== History ==
According to A Dictionary of British Place Names, Wolford derives from the Old English 'wulf' with 'weard', meaning a "place protected against wolves". The Concise Oxfordshire Dictionary of English Place-names adds that 'weard' might mean "guard", and as such might here be unique usage, as an "arrangement for protection, [or] fence", the whole name perhaps "enclosure to protect flocks from wolves".

In the Domesday Book, the settlement is variously listed as 'Ulware', 'Ulwarda' and 'Wolwarde', and in 1242 as 'Parva Wulleward'. In 1086, after the Norman Conquest, Little Wolford was in the Hundred of Barcheston and county of Warwickshire. There were three Tenants-in-chief to king William I: Bishop Odo of Bayeux, Robert de Beaumont, 1st Earl of Leicester (Count of Meulan), and Robert de Stafford. Bishop Odo retained Gerald as his lord, who had acquired the title from the 1066 lord Aelfric (uncle of Thorkil) – the manor contained three villagers, one ploughland with 0.5 men's plough team, and 6 acres (2.4 ha) of meadow. The land of the Count of Meluan had Ralf as lord, again acquiring the title from the 1066 lord Aelfric - the manor contained three villagers, five smallholders, two slaves, and four ploughlands with one lord's plough team and one men's plough team. De Stafford had three manorial lands. Firstly, one where he was also Lord, this acquired from the 1066 lord Vagn (of Wootton), which contained eight villagers, eight smallholders, four slaves and a priest, with ten ploughlands, six men's plough teams and a mill. Secondly, one with Ordwy as lord, acquired from the 1066 lord Alwy, which contained four villagers, four smallholders, six ploughlands, and two lord's and one men's plough teams. Thirdly, where Alwin was the lord in 1066 and 1086, which contained four villagers, three smallholders, a slave, and two ploughlands with one lord's and one men's plough teams.

By the 13th century there were four fields, each two cultivated under a two-field system of crop rotation, and as virgates. A corn mill and fulling mill existed. There were further smaller virgates, one at Pepperwell (then Yperwelle), signified by Pepperwell Lane today at the south-east of the parish. By the beginning of the 17th century there were two watermills, one perhaps on Nethercote Brook which divides today's parishes of Little and Great Wolford. The fields were evident as late as 1940 through aerial photography which indicated a ridge and furrow system of ploughing. This medieval or post-medieval system of cultivation was shown by earthworks which continued beyond the parish.

After Robert de Stafford died (c.1100), his manor at Wolford passed through his sister Milicent de Stafford (who married Hervey Bagot), to her son Hervey de Stafford, who had adopted his mother's name. The manor was divided in 1242 at the time of the later Robert de Stafford, becoming Great and Little Wolford. Ownership stayed with the Stafford family, including the 15th-century Humphrey Stafford, 1st Duke of Buckingham. In 1521, Edward Stafford, 3rd Duke of Buckingham, was executed by Henry VIII for treason. The year before he had, through trustees, sold the manors to Henry's courtier, Sir William Compton. The manors of Great and Little Wolford stayed in the Compton family until 1819, however, at about 1600 they were bought by Robert Catesby, the leader of the group of English Catholics who planned the failed 1605 Gunpowder Plot. They were then, in 1605, transferred to a Thomas Spencer and an Edward Sheldon, by Catesby, Sir Thomas Leigh, and Lord Ellesmere whose wife was sister to the second wife of Henry, Lord Compton. Because of transaction inconsistency, the manors reverted to the Compton family. In 1819 they were sold, by Charles Compton, Marquess of Northampton, to the 1st Baron Redesdale, subsequently passing to his son John Freeman-Mitford, 1st Earl of Redesdale. The unmarried earl then left the manors to Bertram Mitford, created Baron Redesdale in 1902. After his death in 1916, the manors passed to David Freeman-Mitford, 2nd Baron Redesdale, the father of the Mitford sisters.

Sir Nathaniel Brent (c.1573 – 1652) was the son of Anchor Brent of Little Wolford. He was in 1616 the ambassador at the Hague, in 1622 the warden of Merton College, Oxford, and afterwards commissary of the diocese of Canterbury.

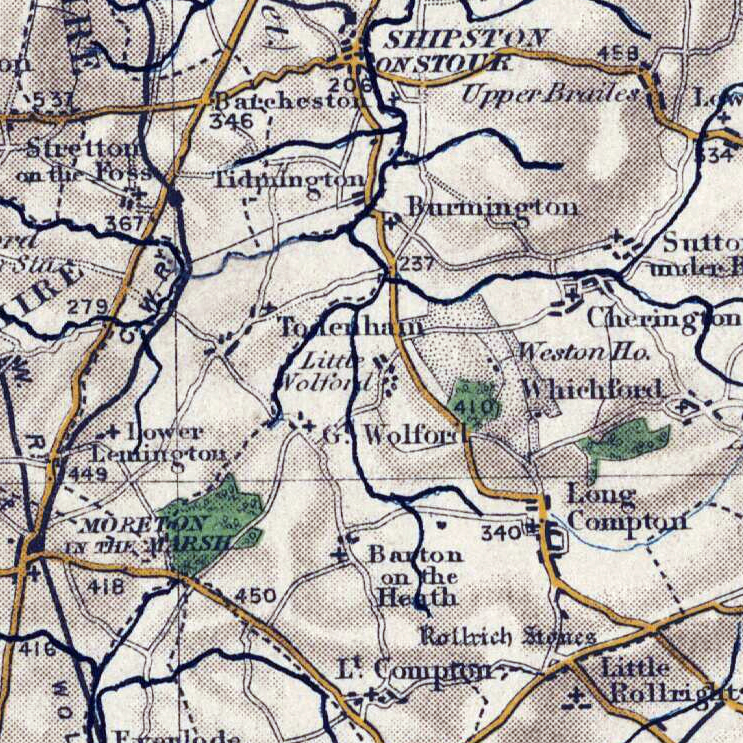
Wolford, including Great and Little Wolford, in 1903

During the 19th century Little Wolford was part of the Brailes division of the Kington Hundred, and described as a hamlet of Great Wolford. In 1801 parish population was 229. By 1841 Little Wolford contained 274 inhabitants in 53 houses, in a parish area of 1,324 acres (536 ha), in which were 339 acres (137 ha) of common land or waste. The industrialist, politician and lord of the manor Sir George Philips in 1844 purchased Little Wolford Manor, formerly in the possession of the Ingram family. Directory listed trades and occupations in 1850 included five farmers, two in the same family, a brickmaker, shoemaker, blacksmith, a corn miller, and two carpenters. By 1896 Little Wolford Manor House was the property of Juliana, Countess of Camperdown, née Juliana Cavendish Philips (1812–1898), the sole landowner and wife to Adam Haldane-Duncan, 2nd Earl of Camperdown. Land area was 1,312 acres (531 ha) in which lived, in 1891, 178 people. There was a post box but no post office. The nearest money order office was at Long Compton, the nearest telegraph offices at Moreton-in-Marsh and Shipston-on-Stour. A National School for 70 children was erected in 1874 by Lord Redesdale; its average 1896 attendance was 61. Trades and occupations listed in 1896 included six farmers, a shoemaker, two graziers and a blacksmith & farrier. Population in 1901 was 181. In 1912 Little Wolford Manor House was the property of the Earl of Camperdown, who was the parish sole landowner. The National School was now a Public Elementary School (Education Act 1902), with an average attendance of 57. Trades and occupations listed were eight farmers, two graziers and a shoemaker.

Although described as a hamlet of Great Wolford (under 'Wolford') in 19th and 20th-century trade directories, Little Wolford and Great Wolford had attained separate parish status under the Poor Law Amendment Act of 1866, which established new civil parishes for the purposes of the New Poor Law of 1834, and collection of poor rate.

== Governance ==
Lowest tier of local government is direct democracy through Little Wolford Parish Meeting, whose remit is more limited than a parish council. The next higher tier of government is Stratford-on-Avon District Council, to which Little Wolford sends one councillor under the Brailes and Compton ward, above this, Warwickshire County Council, where Little Wolford is represented by the seat for the Shipston division of the Stratford-on-Avon area.

Little Wolford is represented in the UK Parliament House of Commons as part of the Stratford-on-Avon constituency, its 2019 sitting MP being Nadhim Zahawi of the Conservative Party.

Prior to Brexit in 2020, it was part of the West Midlands constituency of the European Parliament.

== Geography and community ==
Little Wolford civil parish has no amenities, and is entirely rural, of farms, fields, and dispersed businesses and residential properties, the only nucleated settlement being the hamlet of Little Wolford. It approximates an oval in shape, 2.5 miles (4 km) north to south, and 1.5 miles (2 km) east to west at its widest. It is at the south of Warwickshire, and borders the Todenham parish of Gloucestershire at the north-west. Adjacent Warwickshire parishes are Burmington at the north, Long Compton at the east, Barton-on-the-Heath at the south, and Great Wolford at the west with the boundary defined by the course of Nethercote Brook, a tributary of the River Stour. Most of the southern part of the parish is part of the Cotswolds Area of Outstanding Natural Beauty (AONB).

The A3400 road runs north to south through the parish, locally from Shipston-on-Stour at the north to Chipping Norton at the south. The only other parish roads, apart from farm and residential tracks and cul-de-sacs, is the minor road running east from the A3400 to the village of Cherington, and the minor Little Wolford Road running from the A3400, south through Little Wolford hamlet, then west along the boundary of the AONB to the village of Great Wolford. Running south off Little Wolford Road is Pepperwell Lane which dog-legs east to the A3400. The county town and city of Gloucester is 28 miles (45 km) to the south-west. Closest towns to the hamlet are Moreton-in-Marsh, 4 miles (6 km) to the south-west, and Shipston-on-Stour, 3 miles (5 km) to the north. The neighbouring village of Great Wolford is 1 mile (1.6 km) to the south-west. The nearest railway station is at Moreton-in-Marsh on the Cotswold Line of the Great Western Railway. Bus services operate within Little Wolford. A stop in the hamlet includes connections to Shipston-on-Stour and Burmington on a circuitous village Shipston Link service. The only other stop, on the A3400, includes connections to Shipston-on-Stour, Stratford upon Avon, Chipping Norton, Whichford, Long Compton, and Lower Brailes.

== Landmarks ==
Within Little Wolford is one Grade II* and nine Grade II listed buildings and structures.

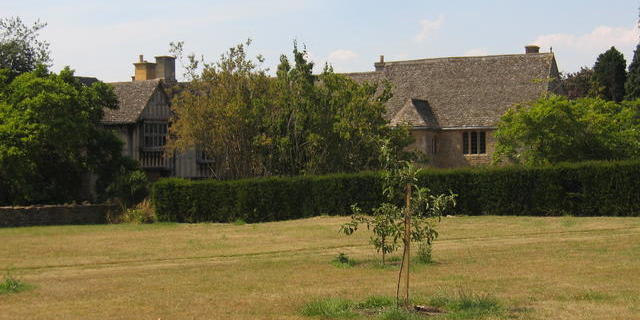
Little Wolford Manor House

Little Wolford Manor House (Grade II* listed in 1987), within the hamlet on Little Wolford Road, with its attached bakehouse and gateway, dates to the late 15th or early 16th-century, but with later additions and changes. Of limestone courses, with earlier parts of ashlar, it is of two storeys and L-plan, previously U-plan until the early 19th century. At the rear of the house is a 17th-century gabled range with a timber framed jetty with oriel windows. Attached is the 17th-century bakehouse, and a cottage. On the opposite side of the road from the Manor House, and just north of Rosary Lane on a private road, is The Hollows (listed 1987), a late 18th century limestone farmhouse, 'L-plan' of two storeys. There are three bays, each with casement windows, and a gabled porch off centre to the right. Between these two buildings, and at the west side of Little Wolford Road at its junction with Rosary Lane, is a wellhead (listed 1987) which probably dates to the 19th century. Set into the pavement wall, and recessed within a structure of coursed limestone which includes fragments of architectural elements, it comprises an iron trough fed by a "beast head". Inset within the structure face, and to the right of the trough is a Victorian post-box.

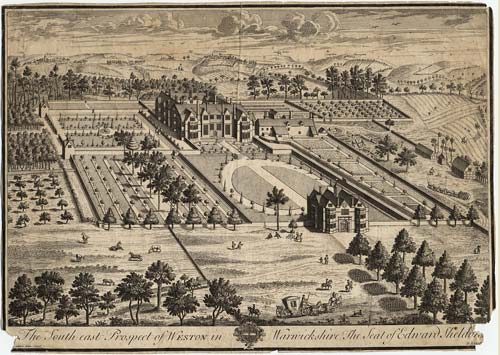
Weston House in 1716

On the A3400 there are four Grade II lodges. The northernmost, at the junction with the road to Cherington, is Broadmoor Lodge (listed 1987), possibly designed by Edward Blore as part of his scheme for the now demolished Weston House. It dates to c.1830 and is of coursed limestone in two storeys with a gabled and buttressed porch with Tudor-arch-style portal, and an upper sill course with gargoyle at each corner below a castellated parapet. To the north of Broadmoor Lodge is a 2011 Grade II listed milepost. Farther south is a house listed in 1987 as Double Lodges, divided into two residences. Dating to c.1830, of two storeys in coursed limestone and T-plan, it is in Tudor domestic style, with dutch gables with two-light mullion windows, and a porch on its front face at right angles to the road. Farther south still is Bedlam Lodge (listed in 1987 with its attached buildings). This dates to the mid-19th century, and is built of coursed limestone in T-plan, and is of one storey and an attic in Tudor domestic style. There are mullioned windows and a gabled porch. The listed rear range outbuilding to the lodge contains a kitchen and a "small dog kennel with 4-centred arch.". The rear range outbuildings to Bedlam Lodge were demolished and an extension added to the original Lodge without planning permission(c.1990). The retrospectively approved extension became the separate dwelling, Bedlam House. Farthest south is Weston Lodge (listed 1987), dating to c.1830, and again possibly designed by Edward Blore as part of his scheme for Weston House. It is built in coursed limestone and in two storeys in Tudor domestic style, with a gabled and buttressed porch with Tudor-arch-style portal, and an upper sill course below a castellated parapet with "polygonal corner turrets". The windows are mullioned with hood moulds, the one on the ground floor facing the road, a bay. To the rear is a one-story gabled range. At the head of the drive at Weston Lodge are two gate piers (listed 1987), both probably dating to the early to mid-19th century. Both of limestone, they are surmounted by poppy-head finials.

Two levelled former earthworks of banks and ditches signifying enclosures, photographed by the Warwickshire National Mapping Project in 1947, are to the east from the hamlet and A3400 road (52.0157°N 1.60843°W), and which, according to Pastscape, "are presumed to be the remains of copse enclosures" and "appear to be a ornamental Park land feature" at what was the south-east edge of the formal park of the now nonexistent Weston House, until the 18th century a 300 acres (121 ha) deer park which was established by Henry VIII.
