= 1st Baron Redesdale =

1st Baron Redesdale may refer to:

- John Freeman-Mitford, 1st Baron Redesdale, of the 1802 creation
- Bertram Freeman-Mitford, 1st Baron Redesdale, of the 1902 creation
