= Stratford by-election =

Stratford by-election may refer to:

== Stratford, Taranaki, New Zealand ==
- 1920 Stratford by-election, following the invalidation of the 1919 election

== Stratford-on-Avon, England ==
- 1901 Stratford-on-Avon by-election, following the death of Victor Milward
- 1909 Stratford-on-Avon by-election, following the resignation of Thomas Kincaid-Smith to restand as an independent
- 1963 Stratford by-election, following the Profumo affair
