= 2nd Baron Redesdale =

2nd Baron Redesdale may refer to:

- John Freeman-Mitford 2nd Baron Redesdale, of the creation of 1802 (afterwards 1st Earl of Redesdale)
- David Freeman-Mitford, 2nd Baron Redesdale, of the creation of 1902
