= Philip Foster (British politician) =

British politician

Major Philip Foster

High Sheriff of Sussex
- In office 20 March 1931 – March 1932
- Monarch: George V
- Preceded by: Ronald Olaf Hambro
- Succeeded by: Desmond Beale-Browne

Member of Parliament for Stratford-on-Avon
- In office 4 May 1909 – 14 December 1918
- Preceded by: Thomas Kincaid-Smith
- Succeeded by: Constituency abolished
- In office 25 June 1901 – 12 January 1906
- Preceded by: Victor Milward
- Succeeded by: Thomas Kincaid-Smith

Personal details
- Born: 11 July 1865
- Died: 5 March 1933 (aged 67)
- Citizenship: British
- Party: Conservative
- Children: 3
- Education: Eton College
- Alma mater: Magdalen College, Oxford

Philip Staveley Foster (11 July 1865 – 5 March 1933) was a Conservative Party politician in the United Kingdom.

== Early life ==
Foster was the only son of Abraham Briggs Foster, chairman of the alpaca and mohair spinning firm of John Foster and Son of Black Dyke Mills, Queensbury, near Bradford. The firm had been founded by Philip's great-grandfather. He went to Eton College in 1879 and Magdalen College, Oxford in 1884, leaving with a degree three years later.

In the late 1880s he held a commission in the 6th West Yorkshire Militia, and from 1890 in the Staffordshire Yeomanry, where he was promoted to major in 1900.

== Parliamentary career ==
After running unsuccessfully for Parliament in 1899 in a by-election to the Elland seat in West Yorkshire, he was elected for the constituency of Stratford-on-Avon in a by-election in June 1901, a seat he held until the election of 1906. Re-elected in 1909, he held the seat until its abolition in 1918.

== Public life ==
He became a director and later, a firm chairman of the family firm John Foster and Sons. He was also chairman of the Air League, and chairman of the Midland Automobile Club. A keen angler and farmer, he became High Sheriff of Sussex for 1931.

== Family ==
Foster married, in 1890, Louisa Frances Wemyss, daughter of Colonel Wemyss. They had three children. He bought a house in Old Buckhurst, Withyham, where he died in 1933 aged 67.

Parliament of the United Kingdom
Preceded by Victor Milward	Member of Parliament for Stratford-on-Avon; 1901–1906	Succeeded by Thomas Kincaid-Smith
Preceded by Thomas Kincaid-Smith	Member of Parliament for Stratford-on-Avon; 1909–1918	Constituency abolished
Honorary titles
Preceded by Ronald Olaf Hambro	High Sheriff of Sussex; 1931–1932	Succeeded by Desmond Beale-Browne
