= Little Wolford Manor =

House in Warwickshire, England

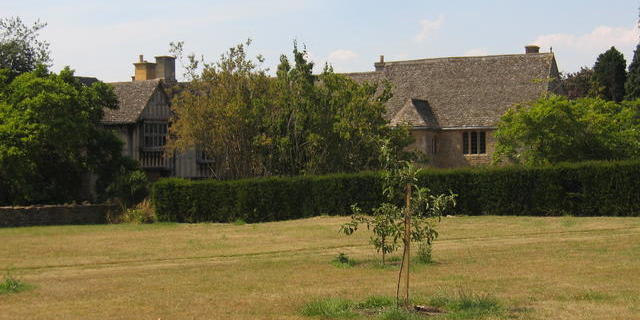
- Interactive map of Little Wolford Manor
- 52.01519°N 1.61936°W
- Location: Little Wolford, Warwickshire, England

Listed Building – Grade II*
- Official name: Little Wolford Manor House and attached bakehouse and gateway
- Designated: 2 September 1952
- Reference no.: 1319952

Little Wolford Manor is a Grade II* listed house in Little Wolford, Warwickshire, England.

It has been a listed building since 1952, and dates back to the late 15th or early 16th century. It was restored in 1935 by Norman Jewson.

It is set in 34 acres, and was purchased in 1957 by Guy and Diana Ward, parents of the present owners (as of 2021). Guy Willoughby Ward died on 29 December 2020, aged 96.

In May 2021, it was listed for sale at a guide price of £5 million.
