= Thomas Kincaid-Smith =

British Liberal politician and soldier

Lieutenant-Colonel Thomas Kincaid-Smith
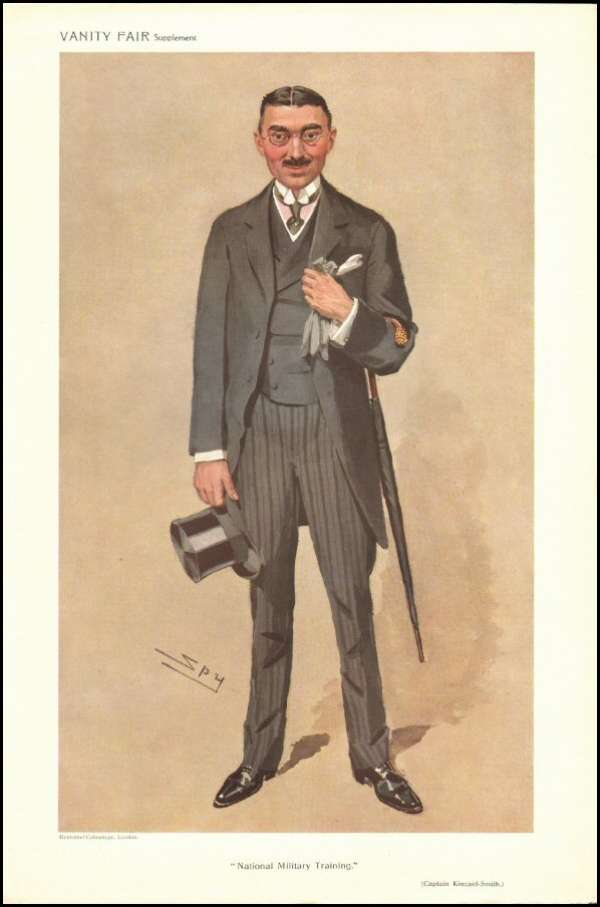

Member of Parliament for Stratford-on-Avon
- In office 12 January 1906 – 8 April 1909
- Preceded by: Philip Foster
- Succeeded by: Philip Foster

Personal details
- Born: 6 July 1874
- Died: 31 December 1938 (aged 64)
- Citizenship: British
- Party: Liberal (1906–1909); Independent (1909); National Party (1918)

Lieutenant-Colonel Thomas Malcolm Harvey Kincaid-Smith (6 July 1874 – 31 December 1938), known as Malcolm Kincaid-Smith was a British Liberal politician and soldier.

Commissioned a second lieutenant into the 9th Lancers on 10 October 1894, he was promoted to lieutenant on 25 September 1895. Kincaid-Smith was seconded for Colonial Office service in October 1898. When he returned from secondment he was back as a regular lieutenant in his regiment in January 1900, and served with the provisional Regiment of Lancers in South Africa during the Second Boer War. Following the end of the war in June 1902, he left Cape Town on the SS Canada and returned to Southampton in late July. He was promoted captain in 1903, but went on half-pay in 1904 due to ill health, and resigned his commission in 1908.

Kincaid-Smith was elected as Member of Parliament for Stratford-on-Avon in 1906. In 1909, he resigned his seat and left the Liberal Party to advocate compulsory military training. He stood as an independent, supported by the National Service League, at the ensuing by-election, but was badly defeated.

Upon the outbreak of World War I, he was recalled from the reserve and appointed a staff officer. He was made an assistant provost-marshal in 1915, holding the post for a year. He was made a temporary major in the Wiltshire Regiment, and then a temporary lieutenant-colonel while commanding a school of instruction and a musketry camp in 1917. In 1918, Kincaid-Smith was transferred to command of a reception camp as a temporary major.

He stood for the National Party in Frome in 1918, but was defeated.

He left the reserves due to age in 1929.

Parliament of the United Kingdom
Preceded by Philip Foster	Member of Parliament for Stratford-on-Avon; 1906–1909	Succeeded by Philip Foster
