= Manuela Perteghella =

Italian-born British politician

Manuela Perteghella MP
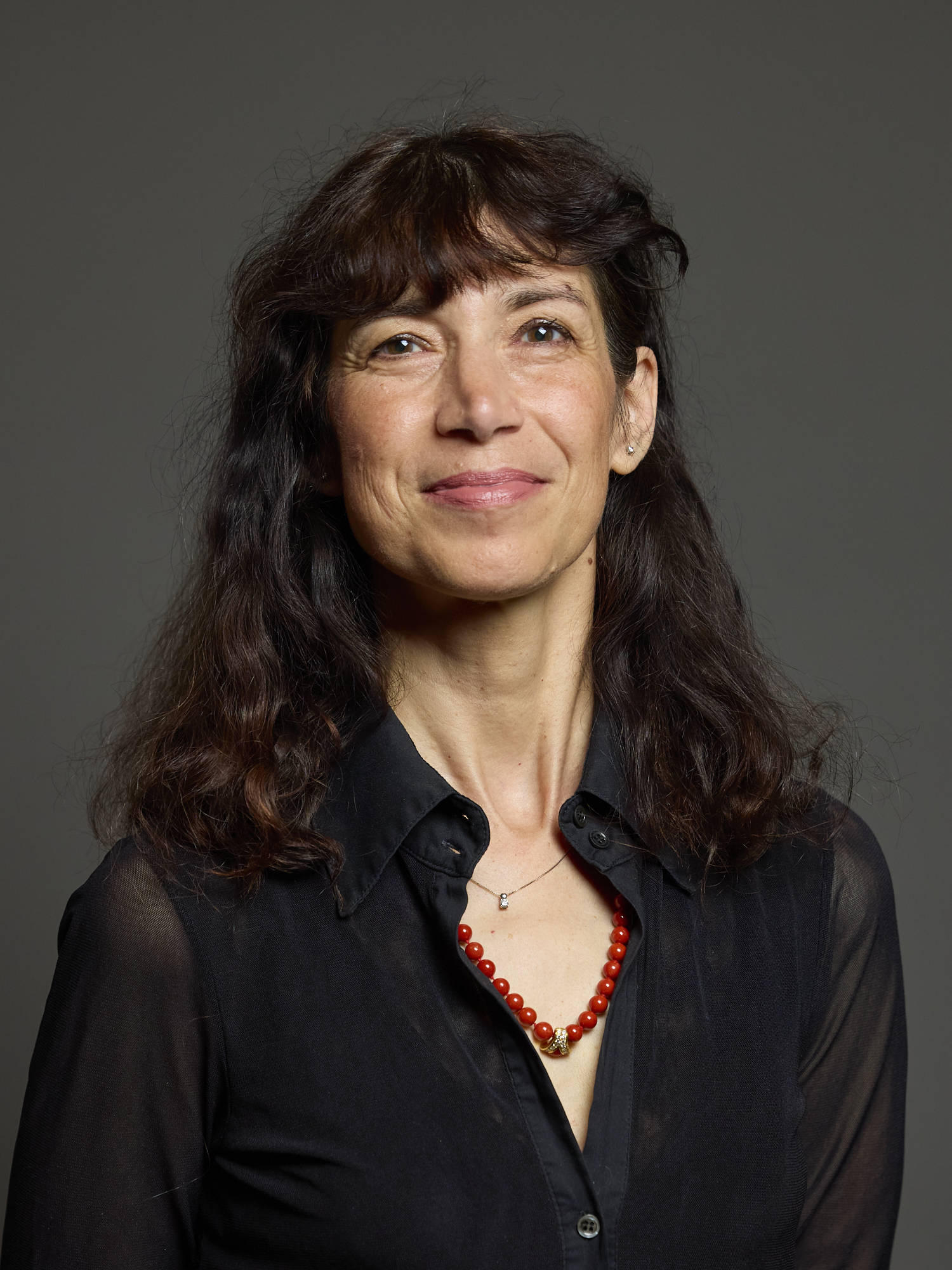
- Official portrait, 2024

Member of Parliament for Stratford-on-Avon
- Incumbent
- Assumed office 4 July 2024
- Preceded by: Nadhim Zahawi
- Majority: 7,122 (13.5%)

Personal details
- Born: 1973 or 1974 (age 52–53) Rome, Italy
- Party: Liberal Democrats
- Spouse: Bruce Horton
- Children: 3
- Education: University of North London (BA); University of East Anglia (MA, PhD)
- Website: manuelamp.org

Manuela Perteghella (born 1973 or 1974) is an Italian-born British Liberal Democrat politician who has served as Member of Parliament (MP) for Stratford-on-Avon since 2024.

== Early life and education ==
Perteghella was born in Italy. She graduated from the University of North London with a Bachelor of Arts in English and theatre studies, and then pursued a master's in literary translation and a PhD in theatre and translation, both from the University of East Anglia.

== Career ==
Perteghella is a former university lecturer and a former school governor. From 2006 to 2012, she was a senior lecturer at London Metropolitan University. She has also worked as a curator of community arts projects, published research in literary translation and been a principal tutor at the University of Warwick, a contributing artist and researcher at King's College London, and an associate lecturer for the Open University.

In the 2024 United Kingdom general election, Perteghella won the constituency of Stratford-on-Avon, garnering 23,450 votes. Her majority is 7,122. She is the first non-Conservative MP elected for the area since 1950 and the first female MP of the constituency. Perteghella had served as a Stratford-on-Avon district councillor, representing the ward of Welford-on-Avon from a 2020 by-election until her resignation in 2025.

According to her Register of Members' Interests, she stood down as a Director of Environmental Policy Consulting following her election, and worked as an Associate Lecturer at the Open University.

== Personal life ==
Perteghella is married to Dr Bruce Horton, who is an environmental economist, and they have three children together.

Despite having lived in the United Kingdom for 30 years, Perteghella was not permitted to vote in the 2016 United Kingdom European Union membership referendum as she was not a British citizen at the time. She cited as her inspiration for entering politics her "feeling of being (quite literally) disenfranchised [which] was, through engaging with politics itself, transformed into a sense of empowerment".

== See also ==
- List of MPs elected in the 2024 United Kingdom general election

Parliament of the United Kingdom
Preceded by Nadhim Zahawi	Member of Parliament for Stratford-on-Avon; 2024–present	Incumbent
