= 1901 Stratford-on-Avon by-election =

UK parliamentary by-election

← 1900	25 June 1901	1906 →

Stratford-on-Avon parliamentary seat
	First party	Second party
Candidate	Philip Foster	Bolton King
Party	Conservative	Liberal
Popular vote	4,755	2,977
Percentage	61.5%	38.5%
MP before election
Victor Milward
Conservative
Subsequent MP
Philip Foster
Conservative

The 1901 Stratford-on-Avon by-election was a Parliamentary by-election held on 25 June 1901. The constituency returned one Member of Parliament (MP) to the House of Commons of the United Kingdom, elected by the first past the post voting system.

The by-election was triggered by the death of the Conservative Party Member of Parliament Victor Milward on 31 May 1901.

== Campaign ==
Despite the Liberals not fielding a candidate in 1900, they did this time with their candidate Bolton King who has been described as a 'radical idealist'. His objective was "to carry the principles of Christianity into political and social life". However, before his campaign could even get off the ground it ran into trouble. His adoption meeting at the Corn Exchange descended into chaos with speeches being interrupted with patriotic songs, chairs being turned over and ultimately, fighting breaking out. By contrast, the Conservative candidate, Philip Foster, had a much more peaceful adoption meeting the next evening in which he called for tolerance as a result of the previous night's events. Two further Liberal meetings at the Corn exchange received an equally malicious response. Learning from this, at King's eve-of-poll rally the seats were arranged in such a way that would reduce confrontation.

== Result ==
Stratford-on-Avon remained a Conservative seat with Philip Foster winning with a majority of 1,778.
