= Tales of Old Japan =

1871 anthology of short stories

Tales of Old Japan (1871) is an anthology of short stories compiled by Algernon Bertram Freeman-Mitford, Lord Redesdale, writing under the better known name of A. B. Mitford. These stories focus on various aspects of Japanese life before the Meiji Restoration. The book, which was written in 1871, forms an introduction to Japanese literature and culture, both through the stories, all adapted from Japanese sources, and Mitford's supplementary notes. Also included are Mitford's eyewitness accounts of a selection of Japanese rituals, ranging from harakiri (seppuku) and marriage to a selection of sermons.

== Table of contents ==
- The Forty-Seven rônins
- The Loves of Gompachi and Komurasaki
- Kazuma's Revenge
- A Story of the Otokodaté of Yedo
- The Wonderful Adventures of Funakoshi Jiuyémon
- The Eta Maiden and the Hatamoto
- Fairy Tales
  - The Tongue-cut Sparrow
  - The Accomplished and Lucky Tea-kettle
  - The Crackling Mountain
  - The Story of the Old Man who Made Withered Trees to Blossom
  - The Battle of the Ape and the Crab
  - The Adventures of Little Peachling
  - The Foxes' Wedding
  - The History of Sakata Kintoki
  - The Elves and the Envious Neighbour
- The Ghost of Sakura
- How Tajima Shumé was Tormented by a Devil of His Own Creation
- Concerning Certain Superstitions
  - The Vampire Cat of Nabéshima
  - The Story of the Faithful Cat
  - How a Man was Bewitched and Had His Head Shaved by the Foxes
  - The Grateful Foxes
  - The Badger's Money
  - The Prince and the Badger
- Japanese Sermons
  - The Sermons of Kiu-O, Vol. 1. Sermon 1
  - The Sermons of Kiu-O, Vol. 1. Sermon 2
  - The Sermons of Kiu-O, Vol. 1. Sermon 3
- Appendices
  - An Account of the Hari-Kiri
  - The Marriage Ceremony
  - The Birth and Rearing of Children
  - Funeral Rites
