= Rupert Mitford, 6th Baron Redesdale =

British hereditary and life peer (born 1967)

The Right Honourable The Lord Redesdale
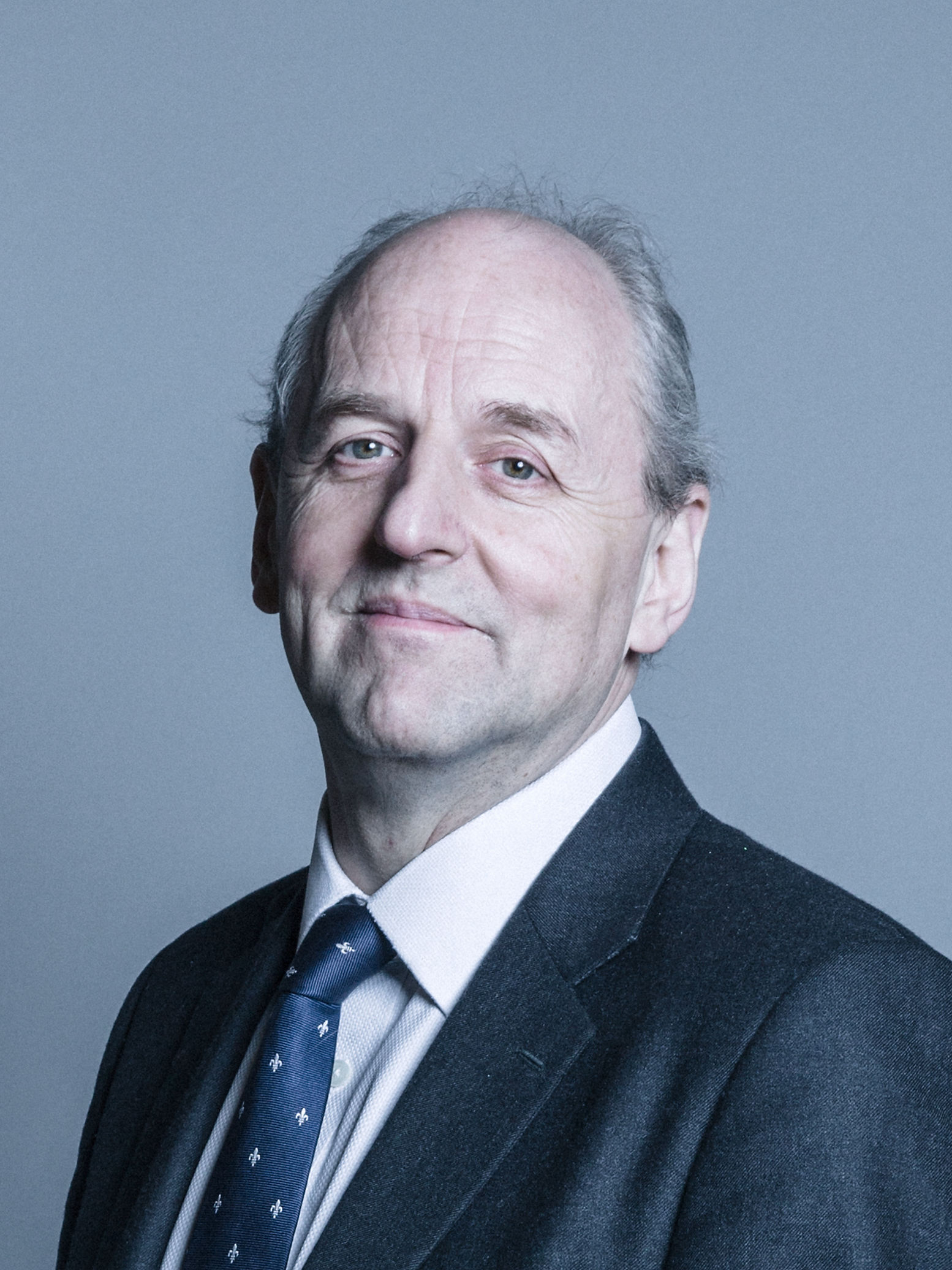

Member of the House of Lords Lord Temporal
- Incumbent
- Life peerage 18 April 2000
- Hereditary peerage 3 March 1991 – 11 November 1999
- Preceded by: The 5th Baron Redesdale
- Succeeded by: Seat abolished

Personal details
- Born: Rupert Bertram Mitford; 18 July 1967 (age 59) London
- Party: Non-affiliated
- Other political affiliations: Liberal Democrat (until 2025)
- Spouse(s): Helen née Shipsey, Lady Redesdale
- Children: Two sons, two daughters
- Education: Newcastle University
- Occupation: Politician

Rupert Bertram Mitford, 6th Baron Redesdale, Baron Mitford (born 18 July 1967), is a British hereditary peer who sat in the House of Lords from 1991 until 1999 before returning in 2000 as a life peer. A former Liberal Democrat, he is a member of the prominent Mitford family.

== Background ==
Mitford was educated at Milton Abbey and Highgate School, before going up to Newcastle University, where he graduated with the degree of BA.

He succeeded his father as Baron Redesdale, of Redesdale in the County of Northumberland, in 1991.

Following the removal of hereditary peers' automatic right to a seat in Parliament by the House of Lords Act 1999, the Liberal Democrats took advantage of an offer from the New Labour Government for some of their hereditary peers to return to the House as working peers. Redesdale was created a life peer on 18 April 2000, as Baron Mitford, of Redesdale in the County of Northumberland. At the age of 32, he was the youngest person ever to receive a life peerage, a record held until Charlotte Owen was made a peeress in 2023 at the age of 30. By convention, the House of Lords refer to peers holding multiple titles by whichever is senior within the peerage. Thus Mitford is known in the House as Lord Redesdale.

He is a first cousin once removed of the Mitford sisters, daughters of the 2nd Baron Redesdale. The youngest of the sisters, Deborah, Duchess of Devonshire, was, with her husband, the 11th Duke, active in the Social Democratic Party. This later merged with the Liberal Party to become the Liberal Democrats, for whom Redesdale sat in the House of Lords before becoming non-affiliated.

== Career ==
He has spoken on various issues on behalf of the Liberal Democrats Parliamentary Party, such as the environment, international development, and science and technology. He is patron of various societies, including one encouraged by his parliamentary colleagues, namely the Red Squirrel Protection Partnership, which advocates strict control of the grey squirrel population so as to enhance the chance of red squirrels' survival.

Lord Redesdale was the Energy Spokesman for the Liberal Democrats for the House of Lords from 2000 to 2008. In 2009 he founded the Anaerobic Digestion and Biogas Association.

In 2012 Redesdale founded, and became the CEO of, the Energy Managers Association.

The Energy Managers Association (EMA) was set up in February 2012 to act as the voice for energy managers across all industries and to enhance the recognition of the Energy Management profession. Redesdale stood down from his role as CEO in December 2020, but remains on the board.

In November 2013, he, along with Jason Franks (formerly of the Daily Mail and General Trust events division), founded Heelec, which launched the Energy Management Exhibition (EMEX). The show attracts over 4,500 professionals from the Energy Managers Association's 25,000-large community.

In 2022, the EMEX London exhibition was acquired by Mark Allen Group to which Redesdale has agreed to stay on as a consultant.

In May 2021, Lord Redesdale, along with business partners, launched an annual exhibition for the UK Metals Sector called the UK Metals Expo, which saw its first edition hosted in September 2022.

The UK Metals Expo benefits from full endorsement and collaboration from the UK Metals Council, its member trade associations and numerous other industry bodies, under the leadership of Lord Redesdale as the conference chair. In December 2024, UK Metals Expo was acquired by Easyfairs to which Redesdale has agreed to stay on as the conference chair.

At the beginning of the 2022–23 parliamentary session, Lord Redesdale entered a Climate and Ecology Bill in the House of Lords new session private members' bill ballot. It was drawn eighth, and the bill's first reading took place on 21 May 2022. Its second reading took place on 15 July 2022, where a cross-party group of peers spoke in favour. At committee stage, Redesdale amended the bill to focus on its nature target in light of the agreement reached at COP15 for nations to halt and reverse nature loss by 2030. The amended bill—the Ecology Bill—passed through its remaining Lords stages successfully, and was handed over to Wera Hobhouse (Liberal Democrat MP for Bath) on 25 April 2023.

Lord Redesdale became non-affiliated in June 2025.

In July 2025, Lord Redesdale backed a last-minute rescue bid from investment firm Muinin Holdings to bail out utilities company Thames Water. Thames Water ultimately rejected the offer, stating that it had "little credibility or viability to recapitalise the business", and that it was "progressing discussions on the senior creditors' plan with Ofwat".

== Personal life ==
He lives with his wife, Helen (née Shipsey), Lady Redesdale, who is a lawyer, and their four children near Tufnell Park, north London, as well as in Northumberland.

The heir apparent to the title is the Hon. Bertram Mitford, born in 2000.

== Arms ==
Coat of arms of Rupert Mitford, 6th Baron Redesdale
| Crest Two hands couped at the wrist Proper grasping a sword erect Argent the point and hilt or the blade enfiled with a boar's head erased Sable. Escutcheon Argent a fess between three moles Sable. Supporters On either side an eagle rising sable beaked and legged or gorged with a wreath of shamrocks Proper and charged on the breast with a fusil also Or. Motto God Careth For Us |

Peerage of the United Kingdom
| Preceded by Clement Mitford | Baron Redesdale; 2nd creation 1991–present Member of the House of Lords (1991–1999) | Incumbent; Heir apparent: Hon. Bertram Mitford |
