= 1909 Stratford-on-Avon by-election =

UK Parliamentary by-election

The 1909 Stratford-on-Avon by-election was held on 4 May 1909. The by-election was held due to the incumbent Liberal MP, Thomas Kincaid-Smith, resigning to restand following his resignation from the Liberal Party. It was won by the Conservative candidate Philip Staveley Foster.

Kincaid-Smith was elected as Member of Parliament for Stratford-on-Avon in 1906. In 1909, he resigned his seat and left the Liberal Party to advocate compulsory military training. He stood as an independent, supported by the National Service League, at the ensuing by-election, but was badly defeated.

Stratford-on-Avon by-election, 1909
| Party | Candidate | Votes | % | ±% |
|---|---|---|---|---|
| Conservative | Philip Staveley Foster | 5,374 | 62.5 | +13.4 |
| Liberal | Joseph Martin | 2,747 | 31.9 | −19.0 |
| Independent | Thomas Kincaid-Smith | 479 | 5.6 | New |
| Majority | | 2,627 | 30.6 | N/A |
| Turnout | | 8,600 | 80.9 | −2.6 |
| Conservative gain from Liberal | | Swing | +16.2 | |
