= Desmond Beale-Browne =

British Army general

Brigadier-General Desmond Beale-Browne DSO JP DL
- Beale-Browne in 1918
- Born: 4 July 1870; Salperton Park, Salperton, Gloucestershire, England
- Died: 1953 (aged 82–83); Lewes, Sussex, England
- Military career
- Allegiance: United Kingdom
- Branch: British Army
- Service years: 1893–1922
- Rank: Brigadier-General
- Units: Second Boer War; First World War
- Commands: 9th (Queen's Royal) Lancers; 2nd Cavalry Brigade
- Awards: Distinguished Service Order; Order of the Crown
- Other work: Justice of the Peace (1932); Deputy Lieutenant (1937)

Brigadier-General Desmond John Edward Beale-Browne DSO JP DL (4 July 1870 – 1953) was a British Army officer who commanded a cavalry brigade in the British Army during the First World War. He attended Eton College, before joining the 9th (Queen's Royal) Lancers, serving in the Second Boer War and the First World War, before retiring in 1920. In later life he became a justice of the peace and a deputy lieutenant of Sussex.

== History ==
Desmond John Edward Beale-Browne was born on 4 July 1870. He was educated at Eton college and Cambridge University in England. He decided to join the British Army and was commissioned into the 9th (Queen's Royal) Lancers. In 1893 he was promoted to lieutenant and seconded to the Army Service Corps. Returning to the lancers, he became their adjutant in March 1895, until July 1898 when he relinquished the post.

In March 1901 he was promoted to captain and seconded to the General Staff as an aide-de-amp. During his service in the Second Boer War, he was awarded the Queen's South Africa Medal with four clasps, Cape Colony, Rhodesia, Orange Free State and Transvaal. Also the King's South Africa Medal with both clasps.

After the war, in April 1906, he was promoted to major. During the First World War the 9th Lancers, was assigned to the 2nd Cavalry Brigade, Beale-Browne became the commanding officer and was promoted to temporary lieutenant-colonel in July 1915. In April 1916 he was mentioned in despatches, and invested as a Companion of the Distinguished Service Order in June 1916. He then became a brigadier-general in October 1915 and commander of the 2nd Cavalry Brigade.

Post war in September 1919, he relinquished his temporary rank of brigadier-general. For his war service he was awarded the Order of the Crown by Belgium, in August 1921. In March 1920, on completion of his term in command, he was placed on the half pay list, and then in March 1922, retires with the honorary rank of brigadier-general.

In his later life in March 1936 he was appointed the Regimental Colonel of the 9th Lancers, became a Deputy Lieutenant, for the county of Sussex, in April 1937, and also appointed as a Justice of the Peace. Desmond Beale-Browne died in 1953.
