= Batsford Arboretum =

Garden near Batsford in Gloucestershire, England

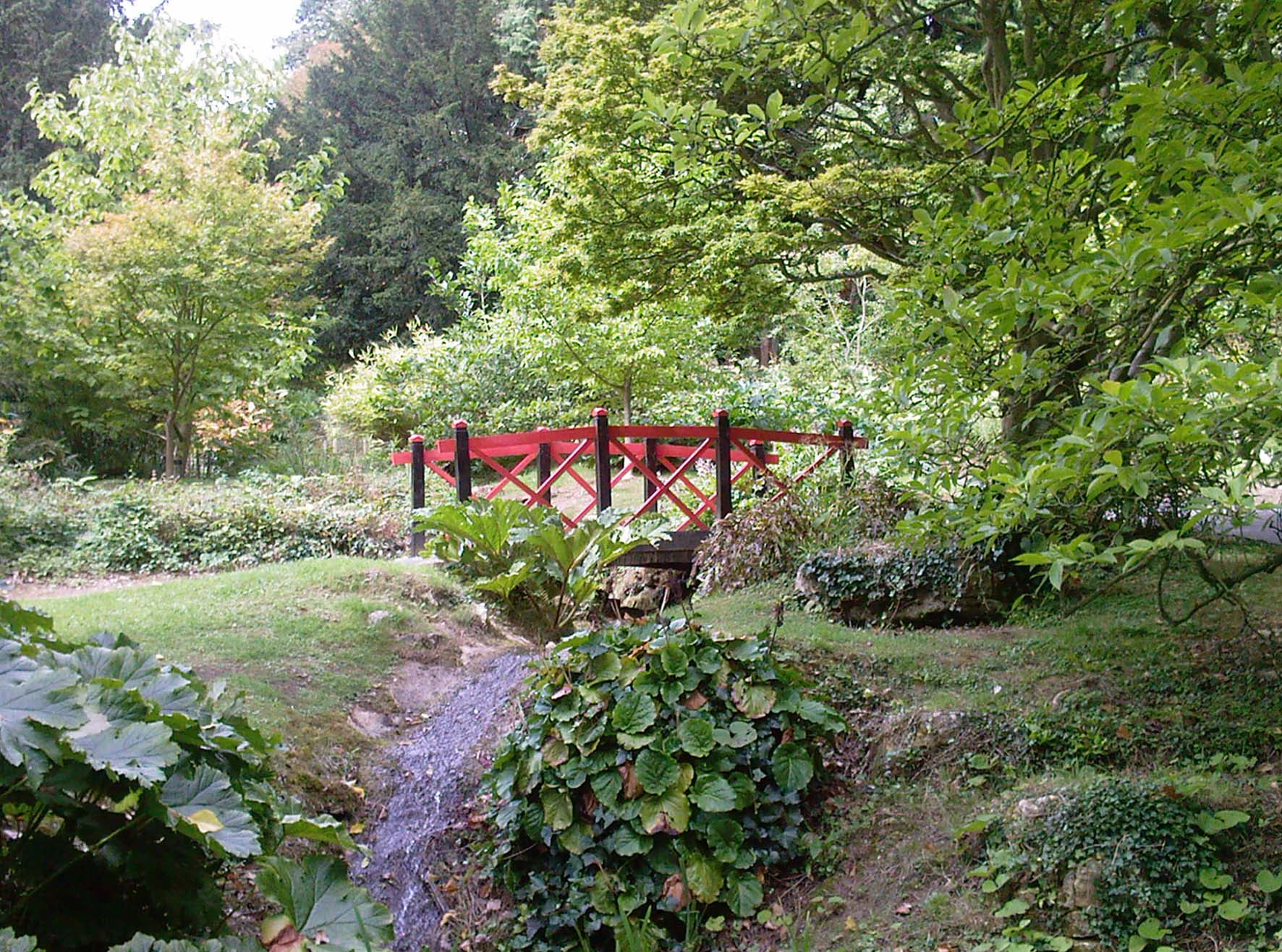
- Japanese bridge over rill at Batsford Arboretum

- Location within Gloucestershire
- Type: Arboretum
- Location: Batsford, Moreton-in-Marsh, England
- Coordinates: 52°0′10″N 1°43′45″W
- Area: 55 acres (22 ha)
- Operator: Batsford Foundation
- Website: www.batsarb.co.uk

Batsford Arboretum is a 55-acre (220,000 m^{2}) arboretum and botanical garden near Batsford in Gloucestershire, England, about 1½ miles north-west of Moreton-in-Marsh, at grid reference SP187339. It is owned and run by the Batsford Foundation, a registered charity, and is open to the public daily throughout most of the year.

The arboretum sits on the Cotswold scarp and contains around 2,900 trees, with a large collection of Japanese maples, magnolias and pines.

== History ==
The estate of Batsford Park was inherited from the 1st Earl of Redesdale in May 1886 by the diplomat and writer A. B. Mitford, who was later created, in 1902, Baron Redesdale (by the second creation). He had travelled widely in Asia and developed the garden as a "wild" landscape with natural plantings inspired by Chinese and Japanese practice.

Lord Redesdale died in August 1916 and the property was inherited by his son, David Freeman-Mitford, 2nd Baron Redesdale. David was the father of the famous Mitford sisters. They lived at Batsford during World War I, and Nancy Mitford based the early part of her novel Love in a Cold Climate on their time at Batsford Park.

Nancy Mitford said in her memoirs that when at Batsford they "ran across country the beautiful bleak Cotswold uplands, starting soon after breakfast when the sun was still a red globe hardly over the horizon and the trees were etched in dark blue against a pale blue, mauve and pinkish sky".

In 1919, the estate was sold by Lord Redesdale to cover death duties to Sir Gilbert Wills, an heir to the W.D. & H.O. Wills tobacco fortune. Sir Gilbert was later created, in 1929, the 1st Baron Dulverton. According to the youngest Mitford sister Deborah, Gilbert was a lifelong friend of her father.

Lord Dulverton and his wife, Lady Victoria, further developed the garden — particularly the formal areas and the Walled Garden — with specimen tree plantings. During the Second World War, the area became overgrown and neglected. However, after inheriting the property in 1956, the 2nd Lord Dulverton restored the garden and returned it to its former beauty.

After neglect during World War II, the arboretum was revived by Anthony Wills, 2nd Baron Dulverton (1915–1992), who succeeded in 1956. He consolidated and expanded the collections and brought Batsford into international repute. To ensure the survival of the arboretum, he donated Batsford Park to a charitable trust in 1984.

In 1992 the 2nd Lord Dulverton died and left the Arboretum to the Batsford Foundation which is a charitable trust which promotes research and education into conservation, arboriculture, gardens and architecture.

Apart from the arboretum, the remainder of the 5,000-acre (20 km^{2}) historic Batsford Estate is privately owned by Michael Wills, 3rd Baron Dulverton (born 1944).

== Development of the Arboretum ==
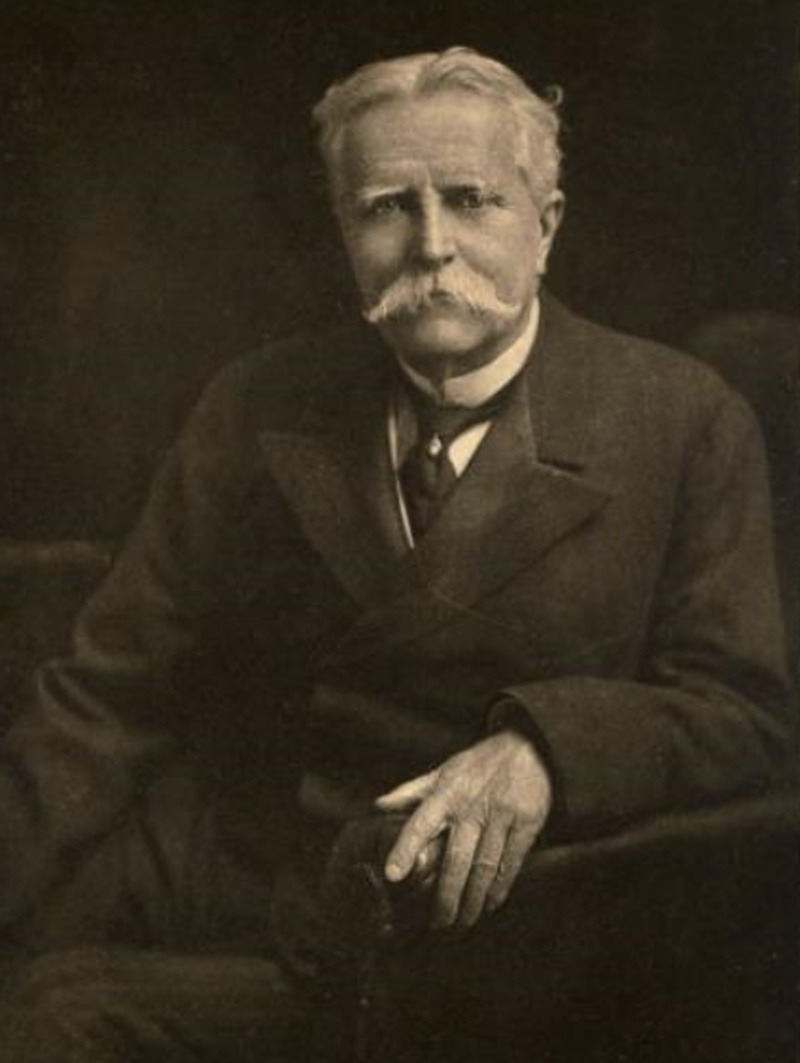
Algernon Bertram Freeman-Mitford

Bertram Freeman-Mitford began development of the Arboretum soon after he inherited the Batsford Estate in 1886. The design was based on observations of gardens he had seen in China and Japan. He made major landscape changes to the existing area. A newspaper article of the time described some of these in detail as follows.

"The first process was to hew a wide glace through the wood leaving here a lofty fir, there a group of hollies, and preserving a dense belt of trees to form a sheltering circumference. Next, a deep ravine was boldly gouged for half a mile or so, and by cunning engineering enough water was collected to send a small rill down it. Still, there were no rocks – not even a stone; and a rabine with earthen sides differs no whit from a railway cutting. These had all to be brought from a distance. Huge blocks from oolite limestone – many thousands of tons of them, some of them weighing each as much as seven tons were carted from a quarry about a mile off, and all these great slabs and blocks from one end of the glen to the other were laid so as to conform to the dip of the native beds so as to give the impression of a rocky gorge which to puny streamlet has prevailed to cut out in the course of ages. Of course cement had to be used but it has been used so cunningly as to deceive the very elect. Even the bed of the stream had to be laid in cement or the water would have soaked away out of sight."

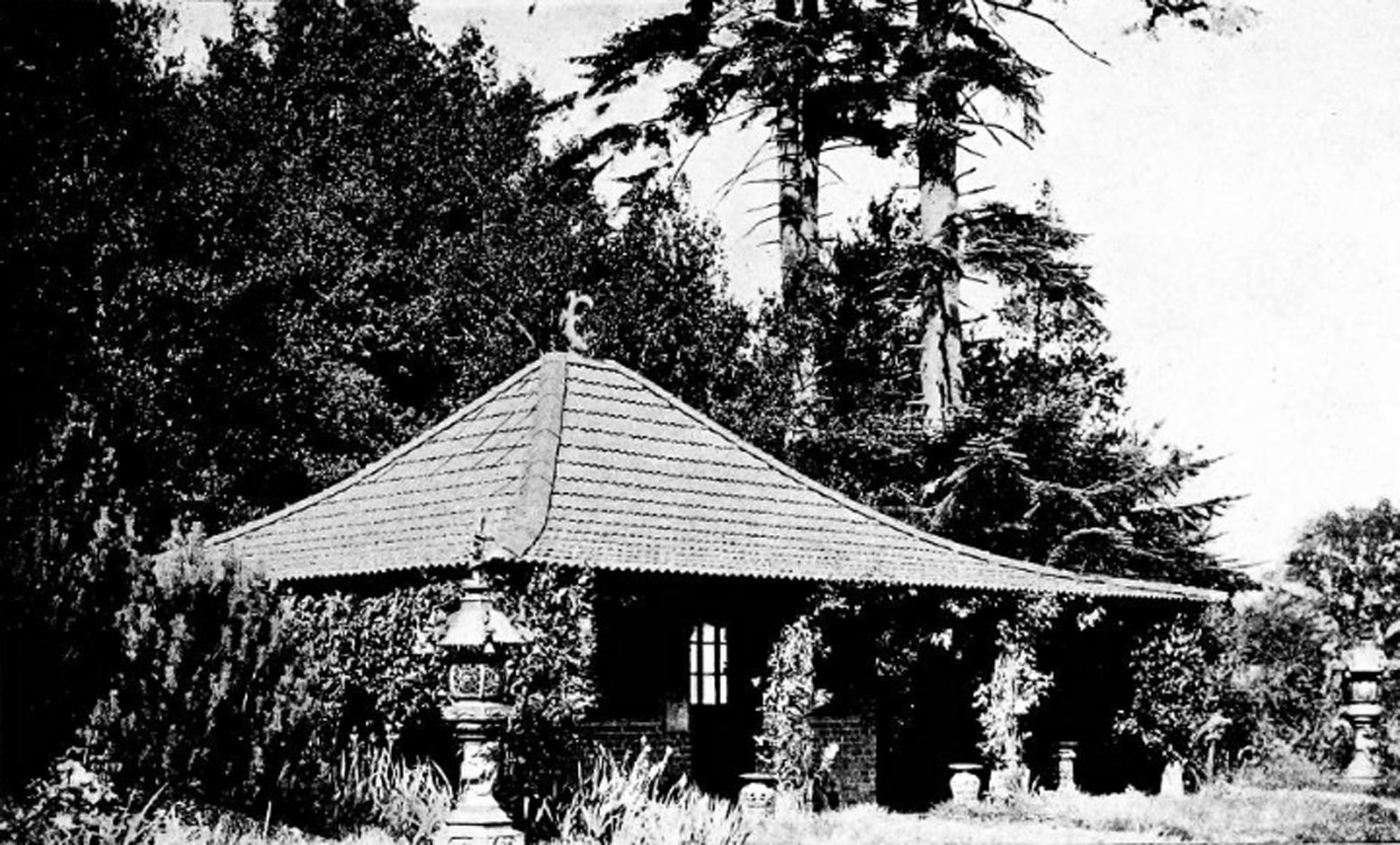
The Japanese Rest house in 1917

Towards the end of his life, Lord Redesdale, as he became in 1902, wrote his memoirs and described his garden and the significance of the Buddha statue, the bronze deer and the Rest House which he brought here in 1900 and are still in the Arboretum. Describing the Buddha statue he said.

"High up in the wildest part of the wild garden, under the shade of a spreading oak, there stands, or rather sits, turned towards the East, as is fitting, a bronze statue of Buddha of heroic size. His hand is raised in the attitude of preaching; his features are expressive of the holy calm and noble abstraction which are traditional in the effigies of the great reformer; the centre of the skull is slightly raised, and between the brows is a curl, representing the wind, the mystic white lock."

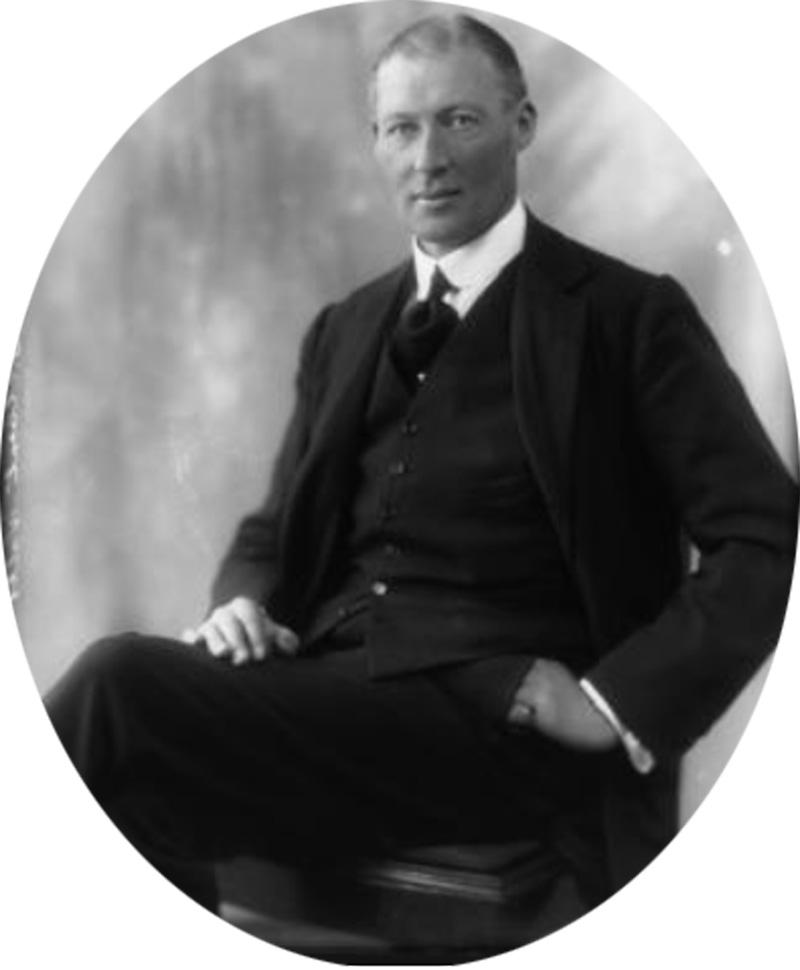
Gilbert Wills, 1st Baron Dulverton

== Status ==
Prunus trees (sato-sakura Group) – Japanese Flowering Cherry – are accredited with Plant Heritage as a National Plant Collection.

== See also ==
- List of botanical gardens in the United Kingdom
