= Victor Milward =

British politician

Member of Parliament for Stratford-on-Avon
- In office 13 July 1895 – 31 May 1901
- Preceded by: Bertram Freeman-Mitford
- Succeeded by: Philip Foster

Personal details
- Born: 29 September 1840
- Died: 31 May 1901 (aged 60)
- Party: Conservative

Colonel Victor Milward (29 September 1840 – 31 May 1901) was a Conservative Party politician in the United Kingdom.

He was elected for the constituency of Stratford-on-Avon in 1895, and held the seat until his death in 1901.

Parliament of the United Kingdom
Preceded by Bertram Freeman-Mitford	Member of Parliament for Stratford-on-Avon; 1895–1901	Succeeded by Philip Foster
