= Baron Redesdale =

Extant barony in the Peerage of the United Kingdom

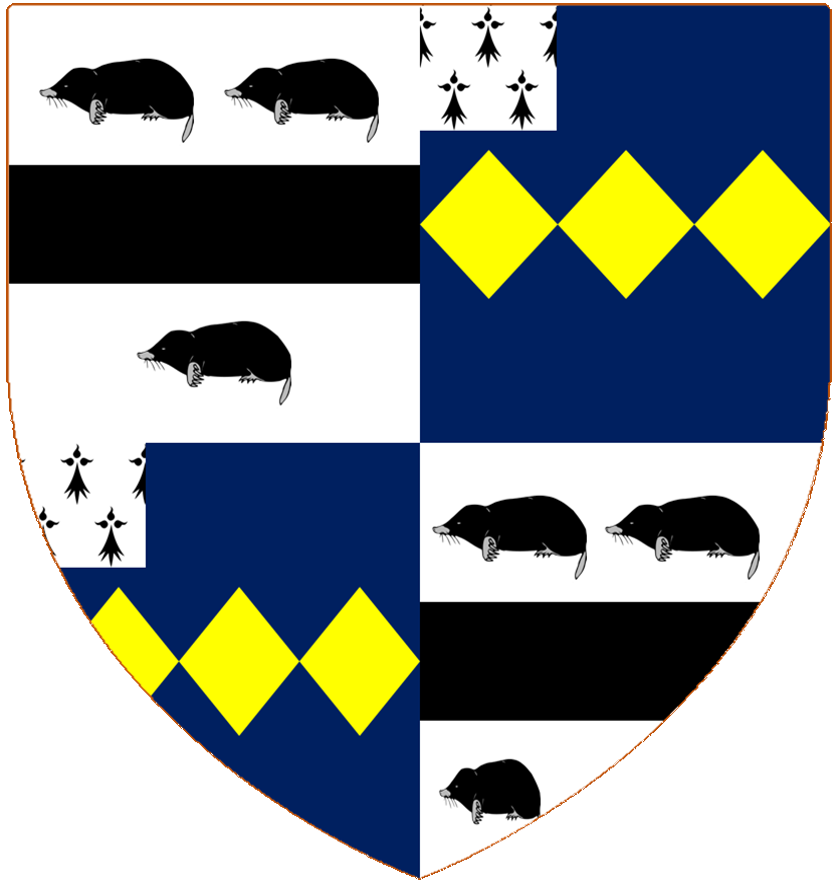
- Arms of Baron Redesdale: Argent, a fess between three moles sable (Mitford); 2nd and 3rd, Azure three Lozenges conjoined in fess Or a Canton Ermine (Freeman)
- Creation date: 1802
- Creation: 1st creation
- Created by: George III
- First holder: Sir John Mitford
- Last holder: John Freeman-Mitford, 1st Earl of Redesdale
- Status: extinct
- Former seats: Mitford Castle; Batsford Park
- Motto: "God Careth For Us"

Baron Redesdale
- Creation date: 1902
- Creation: 2nd creation
- Created by: Edward VII
- First holder: Bertram Freeman-Mitford
- Present holder: Rupert Mitford
- Heir apparent: Hon. Bertram Mitford
- Status: extant
- Former seat: Batsford Park
- Motto: "God Careth For Us"

Baron Redesdale, of Redesdale in the County of Northumberland, is a title that has been created twice in the Peerage of the United Kingdom. It was firstly created in 1802 for the lawyer and politician Sir John Mitford (later Freeman-Mitford). The title was created anew in 1902 for the former's cousin thrice removed Bertram Freeman-Mitford.

== History ==
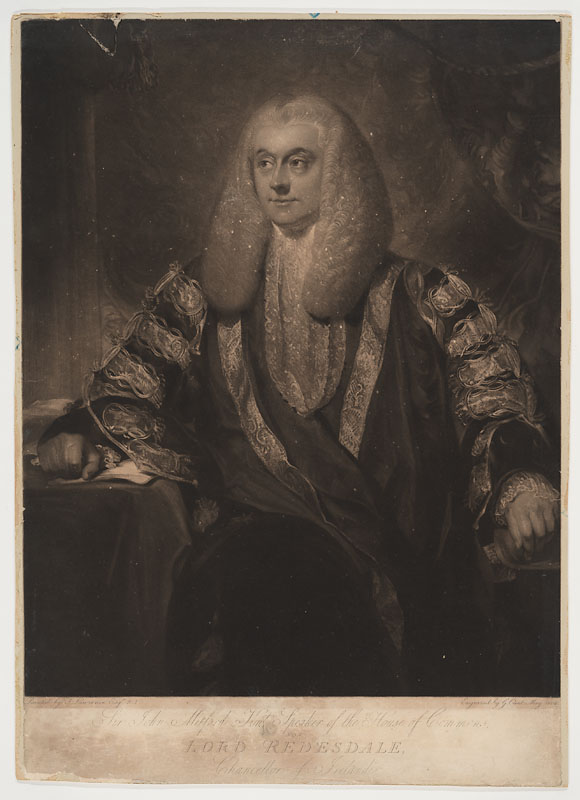
John Freeman-Mitford, 1st Baron Redesdale, by George Clint, following the original by Sir Thomas Lawrence

The Mitford family is an aristocratic English family, with origins in medieval Northumberland where they held Mitford Castle. Sir John Mitford was Speaker of the House of Commons between 1801 and 1802 and Lord Chancellor of Ireland between 1802 and 1806. His only son, the second Baron, served as Chairman of Committees in the House of Lords from 1851 to 1886. In 1877, he was created Earl of Redesdale, in the County of Northumberland, in the Peerage of the United Kingdom. Lord Redesdale never married, and on his death in 1886 both titles became extinct. The Earl bequeathed his substantial estates to his first cousin twice removed, the diplomat, politician and writer Sir Bertram Mitford, the great-grandson of historian William Mitford, who was the elder brother of the first Baron Redesdale.

The Redesdale title was revived when Bertram Freeman-Mitford was raised to the peerage as Baron Redesdale, of Redesdale in the County of Northumberland, on 15 July 1902. He was succeeded by his second but eldest surviving son, David Freeman-Mitford, 2nd Baron Redesdale, who is chiefly remembered as the father of the famous Mitford sisters. He was also a member of the Right Club, founded by Archibald Maule Ramsay. His only son, the Hon. Thomas Freeman-Mitford, was killed in action in Burma in 1945.

Lord Redesdale was therefore succeeded by his younger brother, the third Baron. He was High Sheriff of Oxfordshire in 1935. He died childless in 1962 when the title passed to his younger brother, the fourth Baron. He died in the following year, also childless, and was succeeded by his nephew, the fifth Baron. He was the son of the Hon. Ernest Rupert Bertram Ogilvy Freeman-Mitford, fifth son of the first Baron.

As of 2020, the title is held by the fifth Baron's son, the sixth Baron, who succeeded in 1991. He is a Liberal Democrat member of the House of Lords, who in 2000 was created a life peer as Baron Mitford, of Redesdale in the County of Northumberland, to enable him to return to the House after the majority of hereditary peers lost their seats under the House of Lords Act 1999.

== Baron Redesdale, first creation (1802) ==
- John Freeman-Mitford, 1st Baron Redesdale (1748–1830)
- John Thomas Freeman-Mitford, 2nd Baron Redesdale (1805–1886; created Earl of Redesdale in 1877)

=== Earl of Redesdale (1877) ===
- John Thomas Freeman-Mitford, 1st Earl of Redesdale (1805–1886)

== Baron Redesdale, second creation (1902) ==
- (Algernon) Bertram Freeman-Mitford, 1st Baron Redesdale (1837–1916)
- David Bertram Ogilvy Freeman-Mitford, 2nd Baron Redesdale (1878–1958)
  - Hon. Thomas Freeman-Mitford (1909–1945)
- Bertram Thomas Carlyle Ogilvy Freeman-Mitford, 3rd Baron Redesdale (1880–1962)
- John Power Bertram Ogilvy Freeman-Mitford, 4th Baron Redesdale (1885–1963)
- Clement Napier Bertram Freeman-Mitford, 5th Baron Redesdale (1932–1991)
- Rupert Bertram Mitford, 6th Baron Redesdale (born 1967)

The heir apparent is the present holder's eldest son, the Hon. Bertram David Mitford (born 2000).

== Title succession chart ==
Title succession chart, Barons Redesdale (both creations) and Earls of Redesdale

John Mitford died 1761
Baron Redesdale (first creation)
William Mitford; 1744–1827	John Freeman-Mitford; 1st Baron Redesdale; 1748–1830
Earl of Redesdale
Capt. Henry Mitford; 1769–1803	John Freeman-Mitford; 1st Earl of Redesdale; 2nd Baron Redesdale; 1805–1886
Barony and earldom extinct
Henry Mitford; 1804–1883
Baron Redesdale (second creation)
Bertram Freeman-Mitford; 1st Baron Redesdale; 1837–1916
Maj. Hon. Clement Freeman-Mitford; 1876–1915	David Freeman-Mitford; 2nd Baron Redesdale; 1878–1958	Bertram Freeman-Mitford; 3rd Baron Redesdale; 1880–1962	John Freeman-Mitford; 4th Baron Redesdale; 1885–1963	Hon. Ernest Freeman-Mitford; 1895–1939
Maj. Hon. Thomas Freeman-Mitford; 1909–1945	Clement Freeman-Mitford; 5th Baron Redesdale; 1932–1991
Rupert Mitford; 6th Baron Redesdale born 1967
Hon. Bertram Mitford born 2000

== See also ==
- William Mitford
- Mitford sisters
