= John Freeman-Mitford, 1st Baron Redesdale =

British politician (1748–1830)

The Right Honourable The Lord Redesdale PC KC FRS
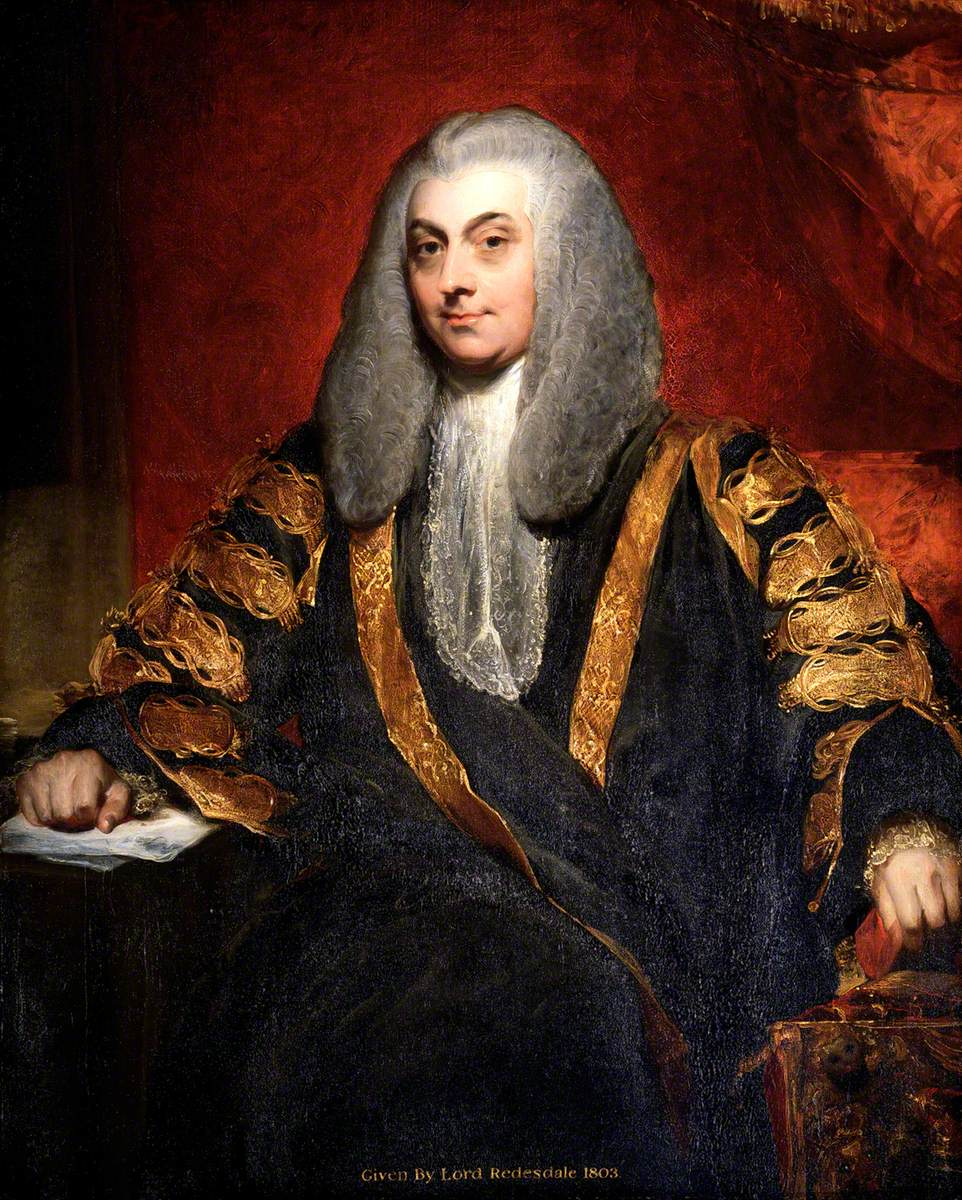
- Sir John Mitford by Sir Thomas Lawrence

Speaker of the House of Commons of the United Kingdom
- In office 11 February 1801 – 9 February 1802
- Monarch: George III
- Prime Minister: William Pitt; Henry Addington
- Preceded by: Henry Addington
- Succeeded by: Charles Abbot

Lord High Chancellor of Ireland
- In office 1802–1806
- Monarch: George III
- Prime Minister: Henry Addington; William Pitt the Younger
- Preceded by: The Earl of Clare
- Succeeded by: George Ponsonby

Member of the House of Lords
- Lord Temporal
- In office 13 February 1802 – 16 January 1830
- Preceded by: Peerage created
- Succeeded by: The 2nd Baron Redesdale

Personal details
- Born: John Mitford; 18 August 1748 London, England
- Died: 16 January 1830 (aged 81) Batsford Park, Gloucestershire, England
- Spouse: Lady Frances Perceval (m. 1803; died 1817)

John Freeman-Mitford, 1st Baron Redesdale (18 August 1748 – 16 January 1830), known as Sir John Mitford between 1793 and 1802, was an English lawyer and politician. He was Speaker of the House of Commons between 1801 and 1802 and Lord Chancellor of Ireland between 1802 and 1806.

== Background ==
Born in London, Mitford was the younger son of John Mitford (died 1761) of Exbury, Hampshire, and Philadelphia, daughter of Willey Reveley of Newton Underwood, Northumberland. The historian William Mitford was his elder brother. He was educated at Cheam School and studied law at the Inner Temple from 1772, being called to the bar in 1777.

== Career ==
Having become a barrister of the Inner Temple in 1777, Mitford wrote A Treatise on the Pleadings in Suits in the Court of Chancery by English Bill, a work reprinted several times in England, Ireland, and America. He was made a King's Counsel in 1789.

In 1788, he became Member of Parliament for the borough of Bere Alston in Devon, and in 1791 he successfully introduced a bill for the relief of Roman Catholics, despite being himself a committed Anglican. In 1793 he succeeded Sir John Scott as Solicitor General for England and Wales (receiving the customary knighthood at the same time), becoming Attorney General six years later, when he was returned to parliament as member for East Looe in Cornwall.

In 1794, he was elected a Fellow of the Royal Society.

In February 1801, Mitford was chosen Speaker of the House of Commons and sworn of the Privy Council. Exactly a year later, he was appointed Lord Chancellor of Ireland and raised to the peerage as Baron Redesdale, of Redesdale in the County of Northumberland. Being an outspoken opponent of Catholic Emancipation, Redesdale was unpopular in Ireland. He had little support from his own colleagues: he was the subject of scurrilous attacks by "Juverna", who was later discovered to be a senior judge, Robert Johnson, who was convicted of seditious libel and forced to resign from the Bench as a result. In February 1806, Redesdale was dismissed on the formation of the Ministry of All the Talents.

Although Lord Redesdale declined to return to official life, he was an active member of the House of Lords on its political and its judicial sides. In 1813, he secured the passing of acts for the relief of insolvent debtors, and became an opponent of the repeal of the Test and Corporation Acts and other popular measures of reform.

== Family ==
Lord Redesdale married Lady Frances Perceval, daughter of the 2nd Earl of Egmont, an Anglo-Irish peer, and sister of Prime Minister Spencer Perceval, in 1803. He took the additional name of Freeman in 1809 by royal licence on succeeding to the estates of his relative Thomas Edwards-Freeman (the heir of a previous Lord Chancellor of Ireland, Richard Freeman). Lady Redesdale died in August 1817. Lord Redesdale survived her by thirteen years and died at Batsford Park, near Moreton-in-the-Marsh, Gloucestershire, in January 1830, aged 81. He was succeeded in the barony by his only son, John, who was created Earl of Redesdale in 1877.

== Arms ==
Coat of arms of John Freeman-Mitford, 1st Baron Redesdale
| Crest 1st: two Hands couped at the wrist proper grasping a Sword erect piercing a Boar's Head erased Sable (Mitford); 2nd: a Demi Wolf Argent charged on the shoulder with a Fess dancetty Gules and holding between the paws a Lozenge Or (Freeman) Escutcheon Quarterly: 1st and 4th, Argent a Fess between three Moles Sable (Mitford); 2nd and 3rd, Azure three Lozenges conjoined in fess Or a Canton Ermine (Freeman) Supporters On either side an Eagle wings expanded Sable beaked and membered Or charged on the breast with a Lozenge also Or and gorged with a wreath of Shamrock Vert Motto God Careth For Us |

== Bibliography ==
Parliament of Great Britain
| Preceded by Viscount Feilding; Charles Rainsford | Member of Parliament for Bere Alston; 1788–1799; With: Viscount Feilding 1788–1790; Sir George Beaumont, Bt 1790–1796; William Mitford 1796–1799 | Succeeded by William Mitford; Lord Lovaine |
| Preceded by William Frederick Buller; John Smith | Member of Parliament for East Looe; 1799–1801; With: William Frederick Buller | Parliament merged with the Parliament of Ireland to form the Parliament of the United Kingdom |
Parliament of the United Kingdom
| New parliament | Member of Parliament for East Looe; 1801–1802; With: William Frederick Buller | Succeeded by William Frederick Buller; James Buller |
Legal offices
| Preceded by John Scott | Chancellor of Durham; 1788–1791 | Succeeded by Sir Thomas Manners-Sutton |
| Preceded by John Scott | Solicitor General; 1793–1799 | Succeeded by Sir William Grant |
| Preceded by John Scott | Attorney General; 1799–1801 | Succeeded by Sir Edward Law |
Political offices
| Preceded by Henry Addington | Speaker of the House of Commons of the United Kingdom; 1801–1802 | Succeeded by Charles Abbot |
| Preceded by The Earl of Clare | Lord High Chancellor of Ireland; 1802–1806 | Succeeded by George Ponsonby |
Peerage of the United Kingdom
| New creation | Baron Redesdale; 1802–1830; Member of the House of Lords (1802–1830) | Succeeded by John Freeman-Mitford |
