= Stratford-on-Avon (constituency) =

Parliamentary constituency in the United Kingdom, 1950 onwards

Coordinates: 52.17°N 1.70°E

- County constituency for the House of Commons
- Boundaries since 2024
- Boundary of Stratford-on-Avon in West Midlands region
- County: Warwickshire
- Electorate: 72,388 (2023 boundary review)
- Major settlements: Stratford-on-Avon, Alcester, Henley-in-Arden, Shipston-on-Stour

Current constituency
- Created: 1950
- Member of Parliament: Manuela Perteghella (Liberal Democrats)
- Seats: One
- Created from: Warwick and Leamington and Rugby

1885–1918
- Seats: One
- Type of constituency: County constituency
- Created from: South Warwickshire
- Replaced by: Tamworth, Rugby and Warwick & Leamington

Stratford-on-Avon is a constituency (Note: A county constituency (for the purposes of election expenses and type of returning officer)) represented in the House of Commons of the UK Parliament since 2024 by Manuela Perteghella of the Liberal Democrats. The constituency is in Warwickshire; as its name suggests, it is centred on the town of Stratford-upon-Avon, birthplace of William Shakespeare, but also takes in the surrounding areas, including the towns of Alcester and Henley-in-Arden.

== Constituency profile ==
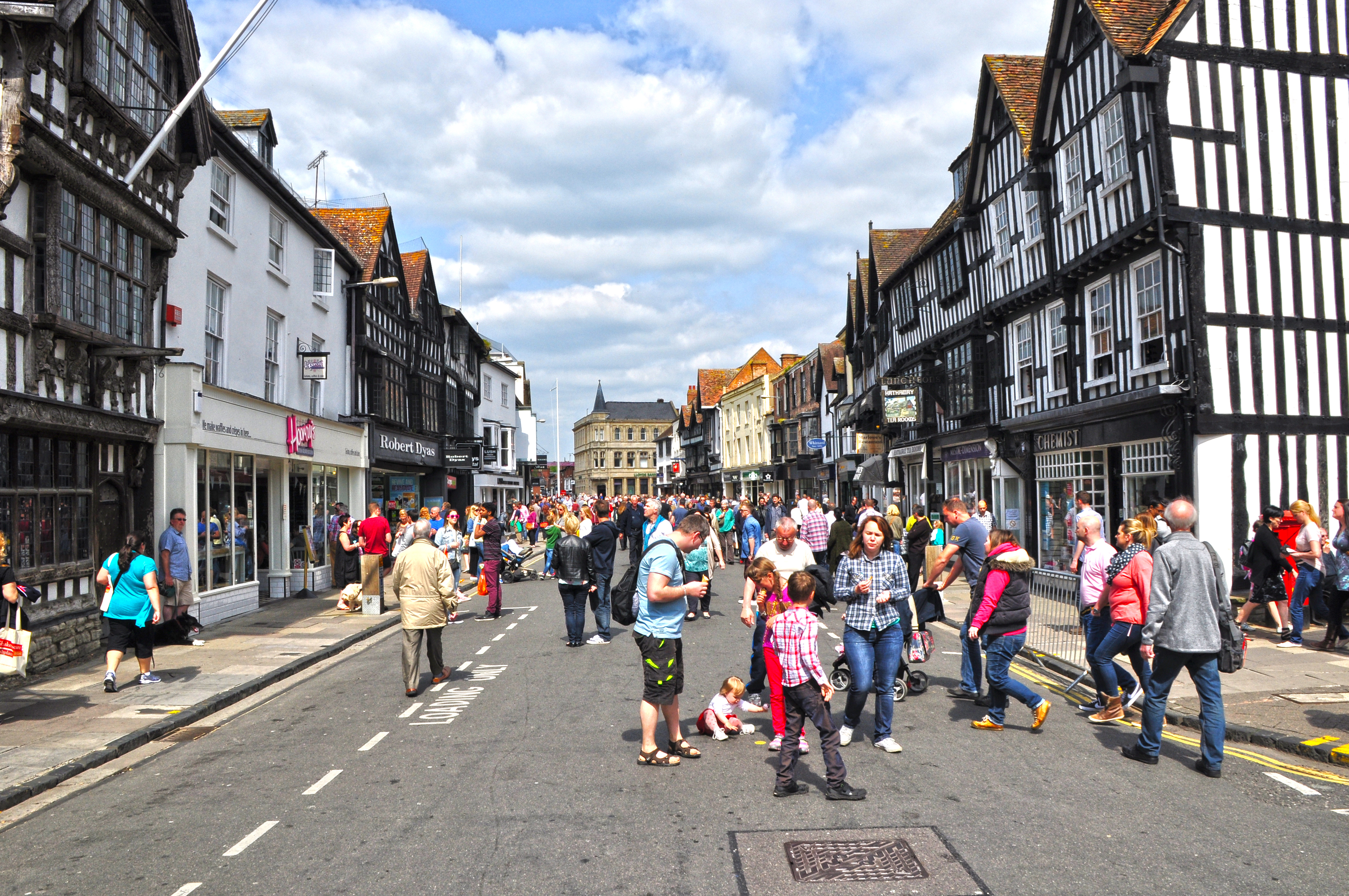
High Street, Stratford-upon-Avon

Stratford-on-Avon is a constituency in Warwickshire in the West Midlands region of England. It is named after its largest town, Stratford-upon-Avon, which has a population of around 31,000. Other settlements include the towns of Henley-in-Arden, Alcester and Shipston-on-Stour and the villages of Bidford-on-Avon and Studley.

This is a rural constituency with many small towns and villages. Stratford is a popular tourist destination, receiving nearly three million visitors a year. It is known for its Tudor architecture and its association with William Shakespeare, who was from the town. Henley, Alcester and Shipston are small, historic market towns. Most of this constituency is affluent with low levels of deprivation, especially in Stratford. House prices across the constituency are generally higher than the UK average and considerably higher than the rest of the West Midlands.

The Stratford-on-Avon constituency has a large retired population and low proportions of young and middle-aged adults. Residents have high rates of income and homeownership, and the child poverty rate is low. They are generally well-educated and are likely to be religious. A high proportion of residents work in the retail, tourism and agriculture sectors, and the percentage claiming unemployment benefits is low. White people made up 95% of the population at the 2021 census.

At the local council level, most of this constituency is represented by Liberal Democrats with some Conservative, Green Party and Reform UK councillors elected in the rural villages. An estimated 51% of voters across the Stratford-on-Avon constituency supported leaving the European Union in the 2016 referendum, similar to the UK-wide figure of 52%.

== Boundaries ==
=== Historic ===
1885–1918: The Boroughs of Stratford-upon-Avon, Warwick, and Leamington, the Sessional Divisions of Alcester, Brailes, Henley, Stratford, Snitterfield, and Warwick, and the part of the Sessional Division of Kenilworth in the Parliamentary Borough of Warwick and Leamington.

1950–1974: The Borough of Stratford-upon-Avon, and the Rural Districts of Stratford-on-Avon, Alcester, Shipston-on-Stour, and Southam.

1974–1983: As 1950 but with redrawn boundaries.

1983–1997: The District of Stratford-on-Avon.

1997–2010: All the wards of the District of Stratford-on-Avon except the wards of Henley, Tanworth, and Tanworth Earlswood.

2010–2024: The District of Stratford-on-Avon wards of Alcester, Aston Cantlow, Bardon, Bidford and Salford, Brailes, Claverdon, Ettington, Henley, Kinwarton, Long Compton, Quinton, Sambourne, Shipston, Snitterfield, Stratford Alveston, Stratford Avenue and New Town, Stratford Guild and Hathaway, Stratford Mount Pleasant, Studley, Tanworth, Tredington, Vale of the Red Horse, and Welford.

At the 2010 general election, following the fifth periodic review of Westminster constituencies, this seat was reduced in size: a new constituency of Kenilworth and Southam was created, taking in much of the eastern half of the previous version of this constituency, along with parts of the abolished seat of Rugby and Kenilworth.

=== Current ===
Under the 2023 review of Westminster constituencies which came into effect for the 2024 general election, there were minor changes to align the boundaries with those of local authority wards. The constituency was defined as composing the following wards of the District of Stratford-on-Avon as they existed on 1 December 2020:

- The District of Stratford-on-Avon wards of: Alcester & Rural; Alcester Town; Avenue; Bidford East; Bidford West & Salford; Bishopton; Brailes & Compton; Bridgetown; Clopton; Ettington; Guildhall; Hathaway; Henley-in-Arden; Kinwarton; Quinton; Shipston North; Shipston South; Shottery; Snitterfield; Studley with Mappleborough Green; Studley with Sambourne; Tanworth-in-Arden; Tiddington; Welcombe; Welford-on-Avon; Wotton Wawen.

Following a further local government boundary review which came into effect in May 2023, the constituency now comprises the following wards of the District of Stratford-on-Avon from the 2024 general election:

- The District of Stratford-on-Avon wards of: Alcester East; Alcester West; Bidford East; Bidford West; Brailes & Compton; Claverdon & Snitterfield; Henley-in-Arden; Kinwarton; Long Marston; Quinton; Salford Priors & Alcester Rural; Shipston North; Shipston South; Stratford Avenue; Stratford Bishopton; Stratford Clopton; Stratford Guildhall & Bridgetown; Stratford Hathaway; Stratford Orchard Hill; Stratford Shottery; Stratford Tiddington; Stratford Welcombe; Studley North; Studley South; Tanworth-in-Arden; Tredington; Tysoe (part); Welford-on-Avon; Wellesbourne East & Rural (small part); Wellesbourne North & Rural (small part); Wootton Wawen.

== History ==
Stratford-on-Avon was first created in 1885 out of the South Warwickshire constituency. It was competitive between the Conservative and Liberal parties, and was abolished in 1918 to be divided between the Warwick and Leamington and Rugby constituencies.

Stratford-on-Avon was reestablished as a constituency in 1950. From its recreation until 2024, the seat elected only Conservative MPs. The earliest member, John Profumo, resigned in 1963 following a scandal involving his extramarital affair; he was followed by Angus Maude from 1963 to 1983. In 1983, Alan Howarth was elected; he crossed the floor in 1995 to serve as a Labour Party MP and moved to the Labour-leaning Newport East constituency for the 1997 general election. Howarth was succeeded by John Maples from 1997 to 2010, followed by Nadhim Zahawi from 2010 to 2024; Zahawi served as Chancellor of the Exchequer for three months in 2022. In the 2024 United Kingdom general election, Zahawi stood down, with Chris Clarkson replacing him as the Conservative candidate for the constituency; he was, at that time, was the MP for the Heywood and Middleton seat. Clarkson would eventually be unsuccessful, with the seat being taken by the Liberal Democrat Manuela Perteghella.

With the exception of a relatively close 1963 by-election, the constituency always returned majorities of over 20% for the Conservatives between 1950 and 2024. Up until 1970, Labour always came second and the Liberals (when they stood) third; and the Liberal/Liberal Democratic parties came second and Labour third in every subsequent general election until 2010. The only occasion on which any other party has been in the top three (or managed to save their deposit) was in 2015, when UKIP came second with just over 13% of the vote. Since then, Labour has come second in 2017, and the Liberal Democrats in 2019.

In May 2023, the Lib Dems gained majority control of the Stratford-on-Avon council for the first time in its history with a 15-seat gain. That compared with the Conservatives, who not only lost their majority but dropped 14 of their seats. On the doorstep, campaigners said issues around the town's Conservative MP came up repeatedly.

== Members of Parliament ==
=== MPs 1885–1918 ===
Election	Member	Party
1885	Lord William Compton	Liberal
1886	Frederick Townsend	Conservative
1892	Algernon Freeman-Mitford	Conservative
1895	Victor Milward	Conservative
1901 by-election	Philip Foster	Conservative
1906	Thomas Kincaid-Smith	Liberal
1909 by-election	Philip Foster	Conservative
1918	Constituency abolished	

=== MPs since 1950 ===
Election	Member	Party	Notes
1950	John Profumo	Conservative	Secretary of State for War 1960–1963; resigned
1963 by-election	Angus Maude	Conservative	
1983	Alan Howarth	Conservative	
1995	Alan Howarth	Labour	
1997	John Maples	Conservative	Previously MP for Lewisham West 1983–1992
2010	Nadhim Zahawi	Conservative	Chancellor of the Exchequer July–September 2022
2024	Manuela Perteghella	Liberal Democrats	

== Elections ==
=== Elections in the 2020s ===
General election 2024: Stratford-on-Avon
Party	Candidate	Votes	%	±%
Liberal Democrats	Manuela Perteghella	23,450	44.3	+19.6
Conservative	Chris Clarkson	16,328	30.8	−29.4
Reform	James Crocker	7,753	14.6	New
Labour	Seyi Agboola	3,753	7.1	−4.2
Green	Doug Rouxel	1,197	2.2	−1.6
Independent	Kevin Taylor	292	0.5	New
New Open Non-Political Organised Leadership (NONPOL)	Neil O'Neil	186	0.4	New
Majority		7,122	13.5	N/A
Turnout		52,959	69.9	−4.0
Registered electors		75,725		
Liberal Democrats gain from Conservative		Swing	+24.5	

- Chris Clarkson (Conservative) ― Incumbent MP for Heywood and Middleton

=== Elections in the 2010s ===
General election 2019: Stratford-on-Avon
Party	Candidate	Votes	%	±%
Conservative	Nadhim Zahawi	33,343	60.6	−1.6
Liberal Democrats	Dominic Skinner	13,371	24.3	+12.2
Labour	Felix Ling	6,222	11.3	−11.0
Green	David Passingham	2,112	3.8	+1.2
Majority		19,972	36.3	−3.6
Turnout		55,048	74.4	+2.1
Registered electors		74,038		
Conservative hold		Swing	−6.9	

General election 2017: Stratford-on-Avon
Party	Candidate	Votes	%	±%
Conservative	Nadhim Zahawi	33,657	62.9	+5.2
Labour	Jeff Kenner	11,699	21.9	+8.9
Liberal Democrats	Elizabeth Adams	6,357	11.9	−0.1
Green	Dominic Giles	1,345	2.6	−1.5
Independent	Jandy Spurway	255	0.5	New
Independent	Tom Darwood	219	0.4	New
Majority		21,958	41.0	−4.6
Turnout		52,532	72.3	−0.3
Conservative hold		Swing	−2.4	

General election 2015: Stratford-on-Avon
Party	Candidate	Votes	%	±%
Conservative	Nadhim Zahawi	29,674	57.7	+6.2
UKIP	Edward Fila	6,798	13.2	+9.5
Labour	Jeff Kenner	6,677	13.0	+3.5
Liberal Democrats	Elizabeth Adams	6,182	12.0	−17.1
Green	Dominic Giles	2,128	4.1	+3.1
Majority		22,876	44.5	+22.1
Turnout		51,459	72.6	−0.1
Conservative hold		Swing	−1.75	

General election 2010: Stratford-on-Avon
Party	Candidate	Votes	%	±%
Conservative	Nadhim Zahawi	26,052	51.5	+2.3
Liberal Democrats	Martin Turner	14,706	29.1	+0.8
Labour	Robert Johnston	4,809	9.5	−5.9
UKIP	Brett Parsons	1,846	3.7	+0.9
BNP	George Jones	1,097	2.2	New
Independent	Neil Basnett	1,032	2.0	New
Green	Karen Varga	527	1.0	−1.3
English Democrat	Frederick Bishop	473	0.9	New
Majority		11,346	22.4	+1.5
Turnout		50,542	72.7	+3.5
Conservative hold		Swing	+0.7	

=== Elections in the 2000s ===
General election 2005: Stratford-on-Avon
Party	Candidate	Votes	%	±%
Conservative	John Maples	28,652	49.2	−1.1
Liberal Democrats	Susan Juned	16,468	28.3	−0.5
Labour Co-op	Rachel Blackmore	10,145	17.4	+0.7
UKIP	Harry Cottam	1,621	2.8	+0.6
Green	Mick Davies	1,354	2.3	+0.2
Majority		12,184	20.9	−0.6
Turnout		58,240	68.8	+4.4
Conservative hold		Swing	−0.3	

General election 2001: Stratford-on-Avon
Party	Candidate	Votes	%	±%
Conservative	John Maples	27,606	50.3	+2.0
Liberal Democrats	Susan Juned	15,804	28.8	+3.3
Labour	Mushtaq Hussain	9,164	16.7	−3.8
UKIP	Ron Mole	1,184	2.2	+1.3
Green	Mick Davies	1,156	2.1	New
Majority		11,802	21.5	−1.3
Turnout		54,914	64.4	−11.9
Conservative hold		Swing	−0.6	

=== Elections in the 1990s ===
General election 1997: Stratford-on-Avon
Party	Candidate	Votes	%	±%
Conservative	John Maples	29,967	48.3	−10.9
Liberal Democrats	Susan Juned	15,861	25.5	±0.0
Labour	Stewart Stacey	12,754	20.5	+7.4
Referendum	Adrian Hilton	2,064	3.3	New
UKIP	JEM Spilsbury	556	0.9	New
Natural Law	James Brewster	307	0.5	+0.3
Stratford First Democratic Conservative	Simon Marcus	306	0.5	New
ProLife Alliance	Sarah Miller	284	0.5	New
Majority		14,106	22.8	−10.9
Turnout		62,099	76.3	−5.8
Conservative hold		Swing	−5.45	

General election 1992: Stratford-on-Avon
Party	Candidate	Votes	%	±%
Conservative	Alan Howarth	40,251	59.2	−2.7
Liberal Democrats	JN Fogg	17,359	25.5	−2.4
Labour	SM Brookes	8,932	13.1	+2.9
Green	RG Roughan	729	1.1	New
Ind. Conservative	AJ Saunders	573	0.8	New
Natural Law	MR Twite	130	0.2	New
Majority		22,892	33.7	−0.4
Turnout		67,974	82.1	+5.6
Conservative hold		Swing	−0.2	

=== Elections in the 1980s ===
General election 1987: Stratford-on-Avon
Party	Candidate	Votes	%	±%
Conservative	Alan Howarth	38,483	61.9	+1.0
Liberal	David Cowcher	17,318	27.9	−1.0
Labour	Robert Rhodes	6,335	10.2	−0.1
Majority		21,165	34.1	+2.1
Turnout		62,136	76.5	+3.6
Conservative hold		Swing	+1.0	

General election 1983: Stratford-on-Avon
Party	Candidate	Votes	%	±%
Conservative	Alan Howarth	34,041	60.9	+0.5
Liberal	James Taylor	16,124	28.9	+8.9
Labour	Frank Hooley	5,731	10.3	−7.4
Majority		17,917	32.0	−6.4
Turnout		55,896	72.9	−3.8
Conservative hold		Swing	−4.2	

=== Elections in the 1970s ===
General election 1979: Stratford-on-Avon
Party	Candidate	Votes	%	±%
Conservative	Angus Maude	35,470	60.41	+9.4
Liberal	James Taylor	12,916	22.00	−5.3
Labour	CA Purnell	10,334	17.60	−4.1
Majority		22,554	38.41	+14.8
Turnout		58,720	76.67	+2.6
Conservative hold		Swing	+7.4	

General election October 1974: Stratford-on-Avon
Party	Candidate	Votes	%	±%
Conservative	Angus Maude	27,123	50.96	−0.8
Liberal	MJW Wright	14,555	27.34	−1.7
Labour	DV Hunt	11,551	21.70	+2.5
Majority		12,568	23.62	+0.9
Turnout		53,229	74.04	−7.0
Conservative hold		Swing	+0.4	

General election February 1974: Stratford-on-Avon
Party	Candidate	Votes	%	±%
Conservative	Angus Maude	30,106	51.77	−6.3
Liberal	MJW Wright	16,885	29.03	+10.7
Labour	M Burton	11,165	19.20	−4.3
Majority		13,221	22.74	−11.8
Turnout		58,156	81.06	+7.0
Conservative hold		Swing	−8.5	

General election 1970: Stratford-on-Avon
Party	Candidate	Votes	%	±%
Conservative	Angus Maude	28,106	58.08	+6.8
Labour	Peter Eric Tombs	11,393	23.54	−6.2
Liberal	David R Bruce	8,895	18.38	+3.4
Majority		16,713	34.54	+12.9
Turnout		48,394	74.08	−4.0
Conservative hold		Swing	+6.5	

=== Elections in the 1960s ===
General election 1966: Stratford-on-Avon
Party	Candidate	Votes	%	±%
Conservative	Angus Maude	22,381	51.30	−2.5
Labour	Vernon G Hale	12,954	29.69	+0.4
Liberal	Gordon H Herringshaw	6,556	15.03	−1.9
Ind. Conservative	Christopher G Clayton-Wright	1,733	3.97	New
Majority		9,427	21.61	−2.9
Turnout		43,624	78.03	−5.0
Conservative hold		Swing	−1.5	

General election 1964: Stratford-on-Avon
Party	Candidate	Votes	%	±%
Conservative	Angus Maude	23,236	53.80	−14.7
Labour	Andrew Faulds	12,646	29.28	−2.2
Liberal	Derick Mirfin	7,307	16.92	New
Majority		10,590	24.52	−12.5
Turnout		43,189	83.07	+6.2
Conservative hold		Swing	−6.3	

1963 Stratford by-election
Party	Candidate	Votes	%	±%
Conservative	Angus Maude	15,846	43.61	−24.9
Labour	Andrew Faulds	12,376	34.06	+2.6
Liberal	Derick Mirfin	7,622	20.98	New
Independent	MS Blair	281	0.77	New
Teenage Party	David Sutch	209	0.58	New
Majority		3,470	9.55	−27.5
Turnout		36,334		
Conservative hold		Swing	−13.7	

=== Elections in the 1950s ===
General election 1959: Stratford-on-Avon
Party	Candidate	Votes	%	±%
Conservative	John Profumo	26,146	68.5	−0.1
Labour	Joseph Stretton	12,017	31.5	+0.1
Majority		14,129	37.0	−0.2
Turnout		38,163	76.9	+1.3
Conservative hold		Swing	−0.1	

General election 1955: Stratford-on-Avon
Party	Candidate	Votes	%	±%
Conservative	John Profumo	24,587	68.6	+4.1
Labour	Thomas LK Locksley	11,275	31.4	−4.1
Majority		13,312	37.2	+8.2
Turnout		35,862	75.6	−4.3
Conservative hold		Swing	+4.1	

General election 1951: Stratford-on-Avon
Party	Candidate	Votes	%	±%
Conservative	John Profumo	24,041	64.5	+7.2
Labour	Henry Hilditch	13,246	35.5	−3.5
Majority		10,795	29.0	+4.4
Turnout		37,287	79.9	−3.2
Conservative hold		Swing	+5.36	

General election 1950: Stratford-on-Avon
Party	Candidate	Votes	%	±%
Conservative	John Profumo	21,492	57.3	
Labour	RGM Brown	12,143	32.0	
Liberal	Hadleigh Sydney Seaborne	4,318	11.4	
Majority		9,349	24.6	
Turnout		37,953	83.1	
Conservative win (new seat)				

== Election results 1885–1918 ==
=== Elections in the 1910s ===
General Election 1914–15:

Another General Election was required to take place before the end of 1915. The political parties had been making preparations for an election to take place and by July 1914, the following candidates had been selected;

- Unionist: Philip Foster
- Liberal: John Pascoe Elsden

General election December 1910: Stratford-on-Avon
Party	Candidate	Votes	%	±%
Conservative	Philip Foster	5,147	59.8	+0.9
Liberal	Walter King	3,462	40.2	−0.9
Majority		1,685	19.6	+1.8
Turnout		8,609	79.5	−6.7
Registered electors		10,835		
Conservative hold		Swing	+0.9	

General election January 1910: Stratford-on-Avon
Party	Candidate	Votes	%	±%
Conservative	Philip Foster	5,505	58.9	+9.8
Liberal	Oscar William Bowen	3,838	41.1	−9.8
Majority		1,667	17.8	N/A
Turnout		9,343	86.2	+2.7
Registered electors		10,835		
Conservative gain from Liberal		Swing	+9.8	

=== Elections in the 1900s ===
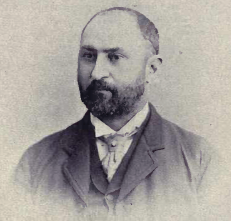
Martin

1909 Stratford-on-Avon by-election
Party	Candidate	Votes	%	±%
Conservative	Philip Foster	5,374	62.5	+13.4
Liberal	Joseph Martin	2,747	31.9	−19.0
Independent	Thomas Kincaid-Smith	479	5.6	New
Majority		2,627	30.6	N/A
Turnout		8,600	80.9	−2.6
Registered electors		10,628		
Conservative gain from Liberal		Swing	+16.2	

General election 1906: Stratford-on-Avon
Party	Candidate	Votes	%	±%
Liberal	Thomas Kincaid-Smith	4,321	50.9	N/A
Conservative	Philip Foster	4,173	49.1	N/A
Majority		148	1.8	N/A
Turnout		8,494	83.5	N/A
Registered electors		10,173		
Liberal gain from Conservative		Swing	N/A	

1901 Stratford-on-Avon by-election
Party	Candidate	Votes	%	±%
Conservative	Philip Foster	4,755	61.5	N/A
Liberal	Bolton King	2,977	38.5	N/A
Majority		1,778	23.0	N/A
Turnout		7,732	76.8	N/A
Registered electors		10,063		
Conservative hold		Swing	N/A	

General election 1900: Stratford-on-Avon
Party	Candidate	Votes	%	±%
Conservative	Victor Milward	Unopposed		
Conservative hold				

=== Elections in the 1890s ===
General election 1895: Stratford-on-Avon
Party	Candidate	Votes	%	±%
Conservative	Victor Milward	4,598	61.9	+6.1
Liberal	Isaac Thomas Sadler	2,827	38.1	−6.1
Majority		1,771	23.8	+12.2
Turnout		7,425	76.2	−2.2
Registered electors		9,745		
Conservative hold		Swing	+6.1	

General election 1892: Stratford-on-Avon
Party	Candidate	Votes	%	±%
Conservative	Algernon Freeman-Mitford	4,157	55.8	+2.4
Liberal	George Septimus Warmington	3,293	44.2	−2.4
Majority		864	11.6	+4.8
Turnout		7,450	78.4	+3.9
Registered electors		9,505		
Conservative hold		Swing	+2.4	

=== Elections in the 1880s ===
Compton

General election 1886: Stratford-on-Avon
Party	Candidate	Votes	%	±%
Conservative	Frederick Townsend	3,833	53.4	+8.8
Liberal	William Compton	3,344	46.6	−8.8
Majority		489	6.8	N/A
Turnout		7,177	74.5	−12.5
Registered electors		9,631		
Conservative gain from Liberal		Swing	+8.8	

General election 1885: Stratford-on-Avon
Party	Candidate	Votes	%	±%
Liberal	William Compton	4,639	55.4	
Conservative	Sampson Lloyd	3,738	44.6	
Majority		901	10.8	
Turnout		8,377	87.0	
Registered electors		9,631		
Liberal win (new seat)				

== See also ==
- parliamentary constituencies in Warwickshire
- List of parliamentary constituencies in West Midlands (region)

== Notes ==
Parliament of the United Kingdom
Preceded by Richmond (Yorks)	Constituency represented by the chancellor of the Exchequer; 2022	Succeeded by Spelthorne
