= Bertram Freeman-Mitford, 1st Baron Redesdale =

British diplomat, collector, and writer (1837–1916)

The Right Honourable The Lord Redesdale GCVO KCB JP DL FRPS
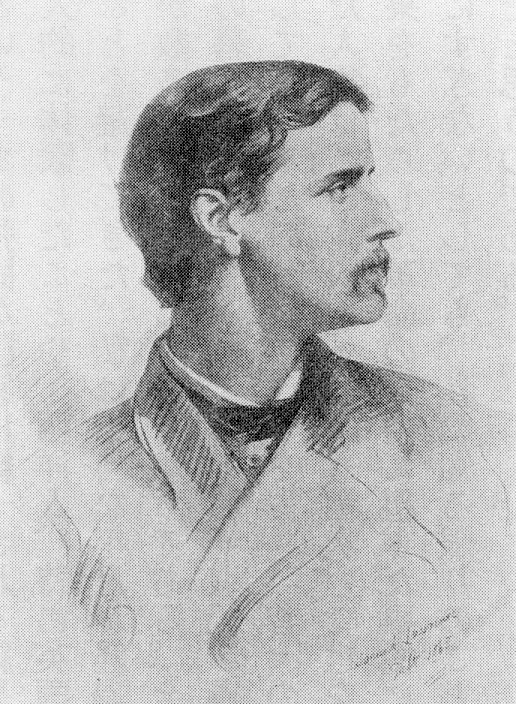
- Portrait by Samuel Laurence, 1865

Member of the House of Lords
- Lord Temporal
- In office 15 July 1902 – 17 August 1916
- Preceded by: Peerage created
- Succeeded by: The 2nd Baron Redesdale

Member of Parliament for Stratford-on-Avon
- In office 4 July 1892 – 8 July 1895
- Preceded by: Frederick Townsend
- Succeeded by: Victor Milward

Personal details
- Born: Algernon Bertram Mitford; 24 February 1837 Mayfair, London, England
- Died: 17 August 1916 (aged 79) Batsford, Gloucestershire, England
- Party: Conservative
- Spouse: Lady Clementine Ogilvy (m. 1874)
- Children: 9, including David
- Education: Eton College
- Alma mater: Christ Church, Oxford

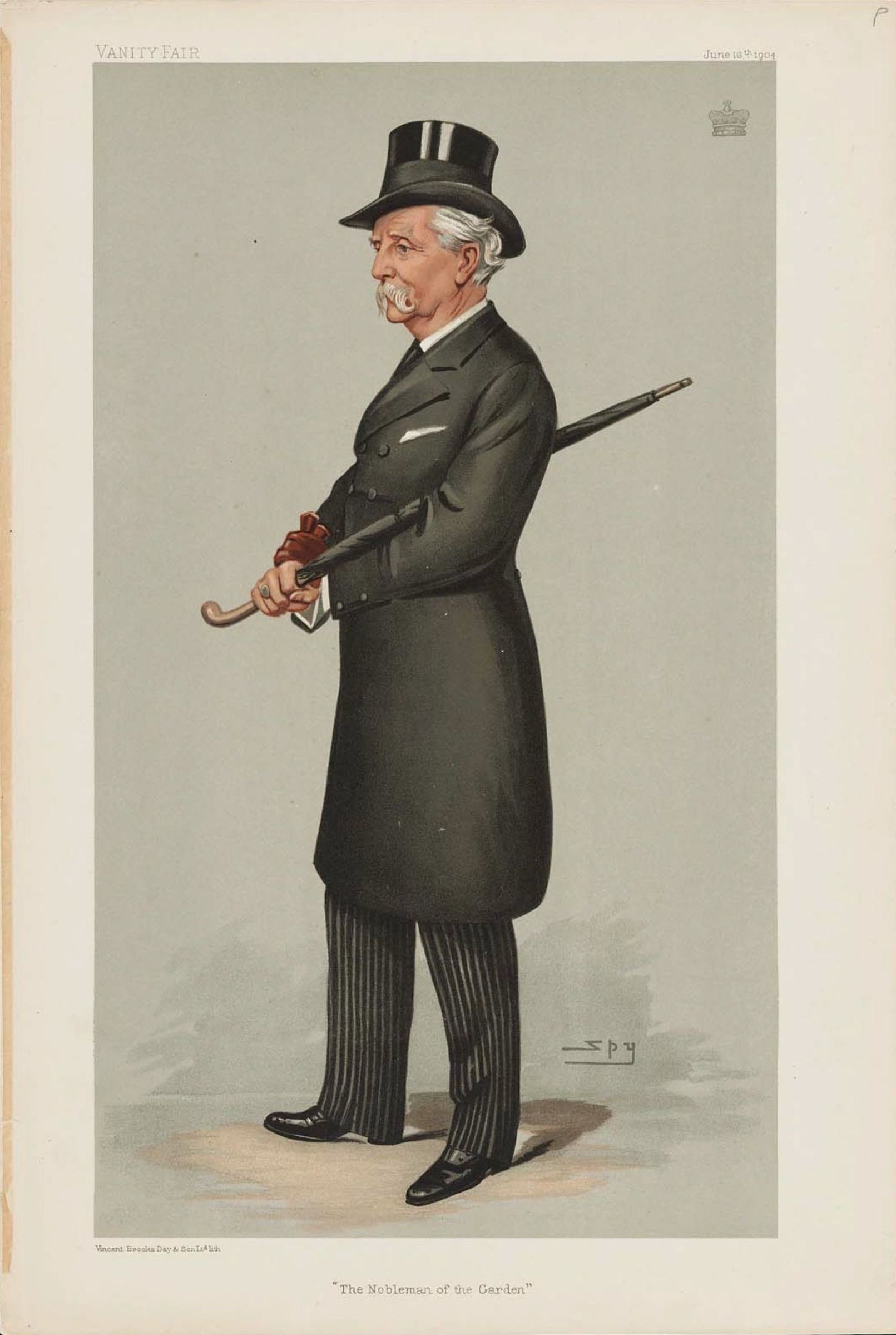
"The Nobleman of the Garden". Caricature by "Spy" published in Vanity Fair in 1902

Algernon Bertram Freeman-Mitford, 1st Baron Redesdale (24 February 1837 – 17 August 1916), was a British diplomat, collector and writer, whose most notable work is Tales of Old Japan (1871). Nicknamed "Bertie", he was the paternal grandfather of the Mitford sisters.

== Early years ==
Mitford was the son of Henry Reveley Mitford (1804–1883), of Exbury House, Hampshire, and great-grandson of the historian William Mitford. He was educated at Eton and Christ Church, Oxford, where he read Classics. While his paternal ancestors were landed gentry, whose holdings included Mitford Castle in Northumberland, his mother Lady (Georgiana) Jemima Ashburnham was the daughter of the 3rd Earl of Ashburnham and Lady Charlotte Percy. After his parents separated in 1840, his father, an erstwhile attaché at Florence, resided in Germany and France; his early years were thus spent on the Continent.

Like his cousin Swinburne, he was named Algernon after his great-grandfather Algernon Percy, 1st Earl of Beverley, but always went by his middle-name Bertram and was known familiarly as "Bertie" (pronounced "Barty").

== Career ==
=== Diplomacy ===
Entering the Foreign Office in 1858, Mitford was appointed Third Secretary of the British Embassy at Saint Petersburg. After service in the Diplomatic Corps in Peking, he went to Japan in 1866 as second secretary to the British Legation at the time of the migration of the Japanese seat of power from Kyoto to Edo (modern-day Tokyo), known as the "Meiji Restoration". There he met Ernest Satow whom he travelled with across the hinterland of Japan. He later wrote Tales of Old Japan (1871), a book credited with making such Japanese Classics as "The Forty-seven Ronin" first known to a wide Western public. He resigned from the diplomatic service in 1873.

Following the 1902 Anglo-Japanese Alliance, in 1906 Mitford accompanied Prince Arthur on a visit to Japan to present the Emperor Meiji with the Order of the Garter. He was asked by courtiers there about Japanese ceremonies that had disappeared since 1868.

=== Public life ===
From 1874 to 1886, Mitford acted as secretary to HM Office of Works, involved in the lengthy restoration of the Tower of London and in landscaping parts of Hyde Park such as "The Dell". From 1887, he was a member of the Royal Commission on Civil Services. He also sat as member of parliament for Stratford-on-Avon between 1892 and 1895.

According to W. S. Gilbert, Mitford served as a consultant on Japanese culture to Gilbert and Arthur Sullivan during the development of their 1885 Savoy Opera The Mikado. A traditional Japanese song hummed by Mitford to Gilbert and Sullivan during a rehearsal was used in the opera for the march accompanying the Mikado's entrance.

In 1886, Mitford inherited the substantial Gloucestershire estates of his first cousin twice removed, John Freeman-Mitford, 1st Earl of Redesdale. In accordance with the will, he assumed by royal licence the additional surname of Freeman. Appointed a deputy lieutenant and justice of the peace for Gloucestershire, he became a magistrate and took up farming and horse breeding. He was a member of the Royal Yacht Squadron from 1889 to 1914. Redesdale joined the Royal Photographic Society in 1907 and became a Fellow in 1908. He was President of the Royal Photographic Society between 1910 and 1912.

Mitford substantially rebuilt Batsford Park, Batsford, Gloucestershire, in the Victorian Gothic manorial style. He also installed the Batsford Arboretum.

== Peerage ==
In the 1902 Coronation Honours list it was announced that Mitford would receive a barony, and the Redesdale title was revived when he was raised to the peerage as Baron Redesdale, of Redesdale in the County of Northumberland, on 15 July 1902. He took the oath and his seat in the House of Lords a week later, on 24 July.

== Pre- and extra-marital fatherhood ==
During his time in Japan, Mitford was said to have fathered two children with a geisha. Later, he may have fathered Clementine Hozier (1885–1977), in the course of an affair with his wife's sister Blanche. Clementine married Winston Churchill in 1908.

== Horticultural interests ==
While in the Far East, he became interested in Chinese and Japanese garden and landscape design and the flora of these countries. On his return, he created the arboretum at Batsford as a wild garden of naturalistic planting based on his Chinese and Japanese observations. His 1896 book, The Bamboo Garden, was the first book on the cultivation of bamboos in European temperate climates and remained the only text on the subject until the 1960s. He persuaded Edward VII to plant Japanese knotweed at Sandringham House and it later became difficult to eradicate, according to George VI.

== H. S. Chamberlain ==
In his closing years, Lord Redesdale edited and wrote extensive and effusive introductions for two of Houston Stewart Chamberlain's books, The Foundations of the Nineteenth Century and Immanuel Kant: A Study and Comparison with Goethe, Leonardo da Vinci, Bruno, Plato, and Descartes, both two volumes each, translated into English by John Lees, M.A., D.Litt., and published by John Lane at the Bodley Head, London, in 1910 and 1914 respectively.

== Marriage ==
In 1874, Mitford married Lady Clementine Gertrude Helen Ogilvy (1854–1932), daughter of David Ogilvy, 10th Earl of Airlie, by his wife, the Hon. Blanche Stanley, daughter of Lord Stanley of Alderley. Mitford and Clementine had five sons and four daughters.

Their eldest son, Clement, died on 13 May 1915 in Belgium during the Second Battle of Ypres while serving with the 10th Royal Hussars, leaving two daughters. Mitford died the following year, and the gravestone inscription for Clement was chosen by the family after the war: "AND SO HE PASSED OVER AND ALL THE TRUMPETS SOUNDED ON THE OTHER SIDE".

Their second son David, who succeeded in the barony, married Sydney Bowles, the daughter of Vanity Fair founder Thomas Gibson Bowles, and was the father of the Mitford sisters; his only son Thomas was killed in Burma in 1945, while serving with the Devonshire Regiment.

=== Issue ===
	Life span	Marriage	Notes
by Lady Clementine Ogilvy
Hon. Frances Georgiana Freeman-Mitford	1875–1951	Married Lt.-Col. Alexander Kearsey, son of Francis Kearsey.	
Major Hon. Clement Bertram Ogilvy Freeman-Mitford	1876–1915	Married his first cousin Lady Helen Alice Wyllington Ogilvy, daughter of David Ogilvy, 11th Earl of Airlie, and Lady Mabell Gore; two daughters.	Killed in action in the First World War.
Hon. David Bertram Ogilvy Freeman-Mitford, later 2nd Baron Redesdale	1878–1958	Married Sydney Bowles, daughter of Thomas Gibson Bowles; had issue.	Father of the Mitford sisters; his only son Thomas was killed in the Second World War.
Hon. Iris Elizabeth Freeman-Mitford	1879–1966		
Hon. Bertram Thomas Carlyle Ogilvy Freeman-Mitford, later 3rd Baron Redesdale	1880–1962	Married Mary Margaret Dorothy Cordes, daughter of Thomas Cordes; no issue.	
Hon. John Power Bertram Ogilvy Freeman-Mitford, later 4th Baron Redesdale	1885–1963	Married Marie Anne von Freidlander-Fuld, daughter of Friedrich Victor von Freidlander-Fuld.	
Hon. Joan Freeman-Mitford	1887–1976	Married Denis Herbert Farrer, son of Rev. Frederick Farrer; had issue.	
Hon. Ernest Rupert Bertram Ogilvy Freeman-Mitford	1895–1939	Married Flora Napier, daughter of Cdr. Gerald Talbot Napier; had issue.	His son Clement became the 5th Baron Redesdale, and his grandson, the 6th Baron, is a life peer in the House of Lords since April 2000.
Hon. Daphne H. M. Freeman-Mitford	1895–1996	Married George Bowyer, who was later created Baron Denham; had issue.	

== See also ==
- Mitford family
- Baron Redesdale
- Meiji Restoration
- Anglo-Japanese relations

== Bibliography ==
- Tales of Old Japan (1871)
- A Tragedy in Stone; and other papers (1882)
- The Bamboo Garden (1896)
- The Attaché at Peking (1900)
- The Garter Mission to Japan (1906)
- Memories (1915; 2 vols)
- Further Memories (Hutchinson & Co., London, 1917 – posthumous)

Lord Redesdale also wrote an extensive Introduction to The Foundations of the Nineteenth Century (1899), and translated, with another Introduction for Immanuel Kant (1914), both by Houston Stewart Chamberlain.

== Notes ==
Parliament of the United Kingdom
Preceded by Frederick Townsend	Member of Parliament for Stratford-on-Avon; 1892–1895	Succeeded by Victor Milward
Peerage of the United Kingdom
New creation	Baron Redesdale; 2nd creation 1902–1916; Member of the House of Lords (1902–1916)	Succeeded by David Freeman-Mitford
