= John Freeman-Mitford, 1st Earl of Redesdale =

British Earl (1805–1886)

The Right Honourable The Earl of Redesdale
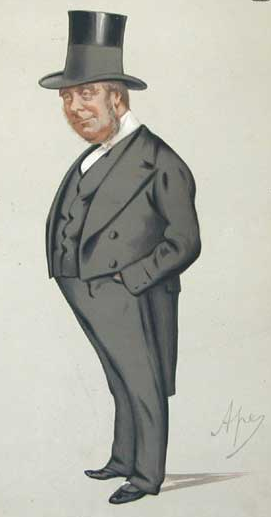
- Lord Redesdale, by Carlo Pellegrini, 1875.

Member of the House of Lords
- Lord Temporal
- In office 16 January 1830 – 2 May 1886
- Preceded by: The 1st Baron Redesdale
- Succeeded by: Peerages extinct

Personal details
- Born: John Thomas Freeman-Mitford; 9 September 1805
- Died: 2 May 1886 (aged 80)

John Thomas Freeman-Mitford, 1st Earl of Redesdale (9 September 1805 – 2 May 1886), styled as the 2nd Baron Redesdale between January 1830 and January 1877, was a Protestant controversialist and member of the House of Lords.

== Life ==
He was born in Dublin on 9 September 1805, the son of the 1st Baron Redesdale, then Lord Chancellor of Ireland. He was educated at Eton and New College, Oxford (BA 1825, MA 1828, DCL 1853).

On the death of his father in January 1830, he succeeded as second baron, but took little part in the debates of the House of Lords until 1837, when he began to interest himself in the wording and detail of Parliamentary bills.

Wellington recommended him to study the private business of the house, so as to qualify himself for the chairmanship of committees, and on the resignation of the Earl of Shaftesbury, 4 February 1851, Lord Redesdale was unanimously chosen his successor, with the approval of Lansdowne, Stanley, and Wellington. This appointment he held with general credit until his death, and though assiduous in presiding when bills were in committee, made his power chiefly felt over private bill legislation.

His shrewdness and independence of judgment enabled him to detect the artifices of attorneys and agents, while his dictatorial manner was proverbial. Though he regarded all things, great and small, with a genuine conservatism, yet he never allowed his peculiar views to warp his decisions. Redesdale was especially severe on the drafting of railway bills, and in 1867 threatened to hale a contractor named France to the bar of the house for expressions reflecting on him as chairman. The correspondence showed that he was acting under a misapprehension. Nevertheless, his firm and honest management increased the authority of the House of Lords in connection with private business.

Redesdale was also a frequent speaker on general topics, e.g. the Reform Bill of 1867, when he opposed the Earl Grey's amendment for the disfranchisement of certain boroughs, on the ground that the matter was beyond the proper jurisdiction of the peers, and that it was a mistake to make the franchise a party question. On the Alabama Claims, he maintained in 1872 that the United States had no claims to compensation because the Southerners had reentered the Union at the close of the war.

== Controversialist ==
But his interests lay chiefly in religious topics, on which he assumed a pronouncedly Protestant and orthodox attitude.

He published in 1849 some 'Reflections on the Doctrine of Regeneration and its Connection with both Sacraments, and in 1850 some 'Observations on the Gorham Judgment and its Consequences.' In 1853 he was one of the revivers of convocation.

He refused to sign the report of the royal commission on the law of divorce, of which he was a member, on the ground that the dissolution of the marriage tie was contrary to Scripture, and besides vindicating his views in a pamphlet entitled 'The Law of Scripture against Divorce' (1856), offered vigorous opposition to the measure of the following year.

Equally outspoken was his resistance to the disestablishment of the Church of Ireland, which he maintained to be a violation of the Coronation Oath. On 17 July 1868, he moved for a copy of the oath, besides publishing two pamphlets, 'Some of the Arguments by which Mr. Gladstone's Resolutions are supported considered' (1868), and 'Lord Macaulay on the Coronation Oath' (1869).

In 1874, appeared 'Reasoning on some Points of Doctrine,' and in 1875 Redesdale entered into a controversy with Cardinal Manning in The Daily Telegraph on the subject of communion in both kinds. The correspondence was republished by the 'Press and St. James's Chronicle,' under the title of 'The Infallible Church and the Holy Communion.' Redesdale displayed considerable ingenuity in forcing the cardinal to base his arguments on authorities whose cogency he had denied, but, as might be expected from the predispositions of the dialecticians, the dispute led to no practical result.

On 3 January 1877, he was created Earl of Redesdale, in the County of Northumberland, on Disraeli's recommendation.

On 14 June, he called attention in the House of Lords to a manual entitled 'The Priest in Absolution,' published privately for the use of the clergy by the Society of the Holy Cross, and elicited a strong condemnation of its doctrines from Archbishop Archibald Tait.

In the same year also appeared his 'Apostolic Doctrine of the Real Presence,' and in 1879 'On the Doctrine of the Real Presence; Correspondence between the Earl of Redesdale and the Hon. C. L. Wood, a discussion evoked by a speech of the latter at a meeting of the university branch of the English Church Union.

Redesdale also published 'Thoughts on English Prosody and Translations from Horace,' and 'Further Thoughts on English Prosody' (1859), odd attempts, suggested by an article in the ' Quarterly Review,' vol. cxiv., on 'Horace and his Translators,' to formulate rules of quantity for the English language on Latin models. His last pamphlet was 'The Earldom of Mar: a Letter to the Lord Register of Scotland, the Earl of Glasgow,' a reply to the Earl of Crawford's criticisms of Glasgow's judgment.

He died unmarried on 2 May 1886, when the peerages became extinct. The earl bequeathed his estates to his kinsman, Bertram Freeman-Mitford, for whom the barony of Redesdale was re-created in 1902.

Peerage of the United Kingdom
New creation	Earl of Redesdale; 1877–1886	Extinct
Preceded by John Freeman-Mitford	Baron Redesdale; 1830–1886; Member of the House of Lords (1830–1886)	Extinct
