= Holbeche family =

British Family

Holbeche
- English Gentry Family
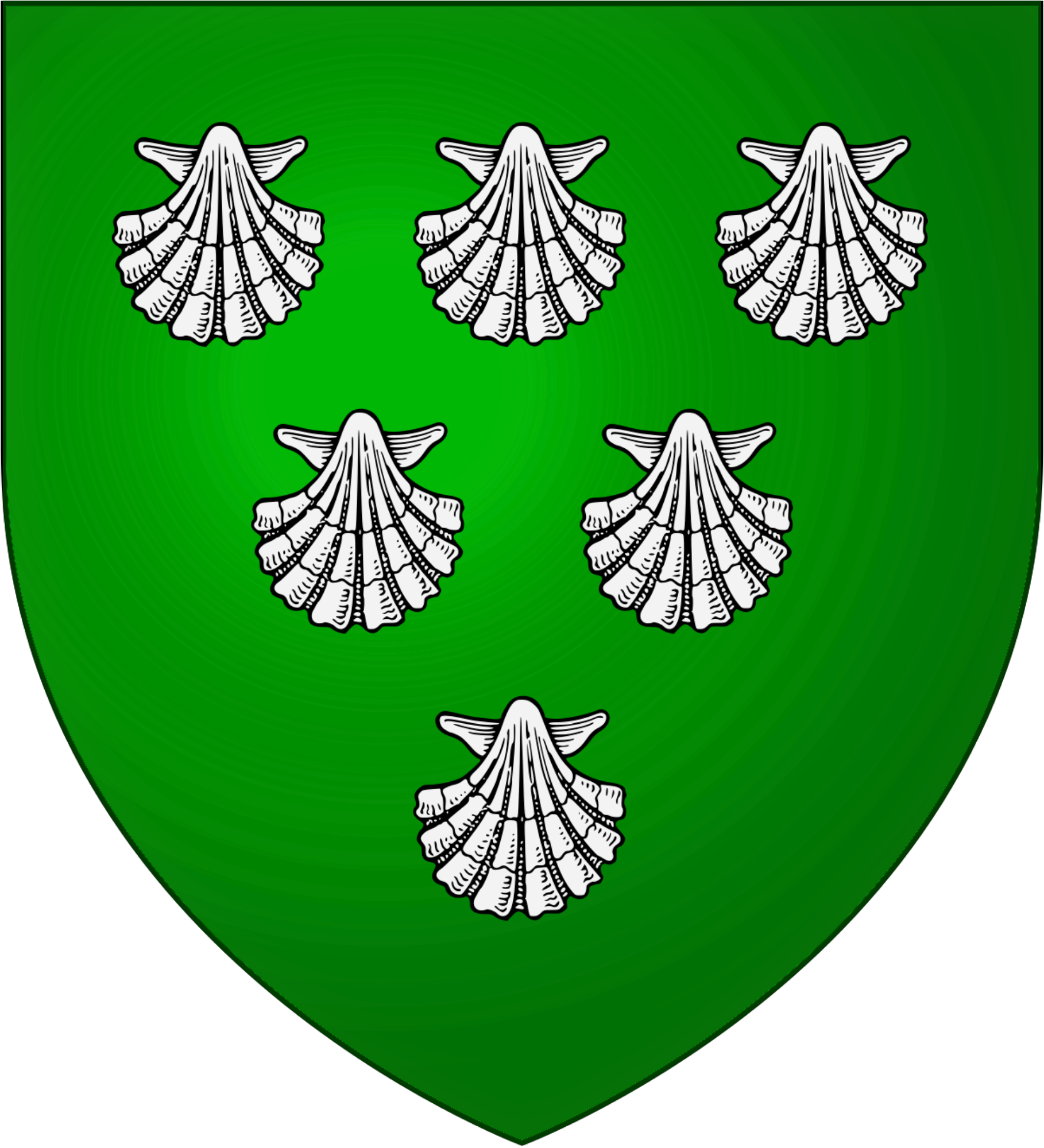
- Holbeche Coat Of Arms – Vert, six escallops three, two and one, argent; crest: a maunch vert charged with escallops argent.
- Country: England
- Current region: Wiltshire/Warwickshire
- Origin: Holbeach, Lincolnshire
- Founded: 1223; 803 years ago
- Founder: Thomas Holbeche
- Historic seat: Farnborough Hall; Stoneleigh Abbey

The Holbeche (also spelt Holbech) family is an English gentry family of medieval origin associated with Lincolnshire and, from the early modern period, with Warwickshire. The family has been documented in county histories, heraldic visitations, and genealogical works since the 1200s. From the late seventeenth century their principal seat was Farnborough Hall. A major branch became connected with Stoneleigh Abbey in the early eighteenth century.

== History ==
The Holbeche family is first recorded in Holbeach, Lincolnshire, where they were medieval landholders and knights. Branches of the family were established in Warwickshire by the early modern period, particularly around Fillongley, where they held land and local offices.

During the sixteenth and seventeenth centuries, members of the family appear in visitation records and county histories as owners of properties in Fillongley and neighbouring parishes. Ince notes references in early narratives to Thomas Holbeche who served in the 1544 campaigns at Boulogne and Montreuil, with heraldic sources attributing later augmentations of the arms to this period.

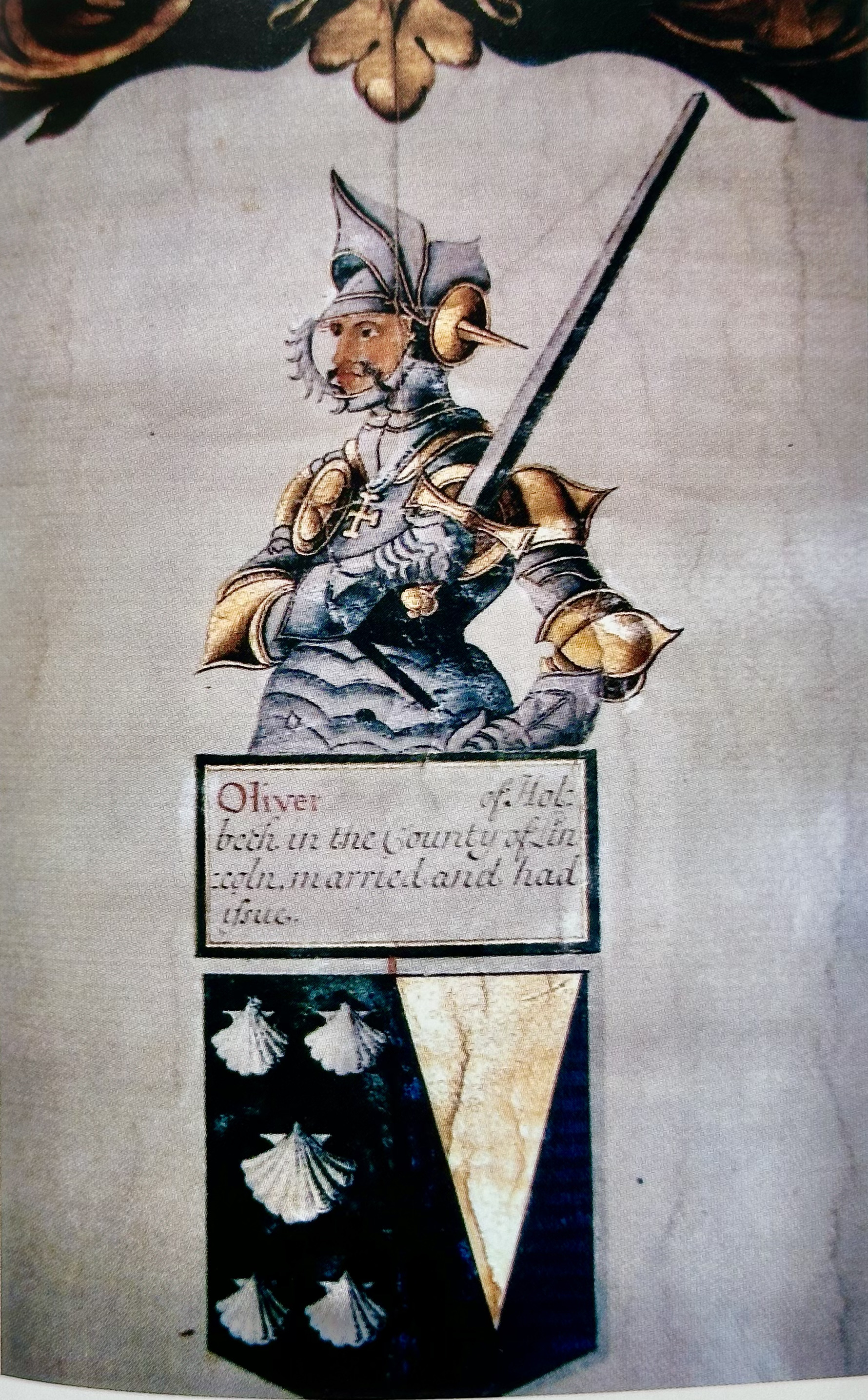
Oliver Holbeche (Circa 1223)

== Heraldry ==
The arms associated with the Holbeche family are: Vert, six escallops three, two and one, argent. The crest is: A maunch vert charged with escallops argent.

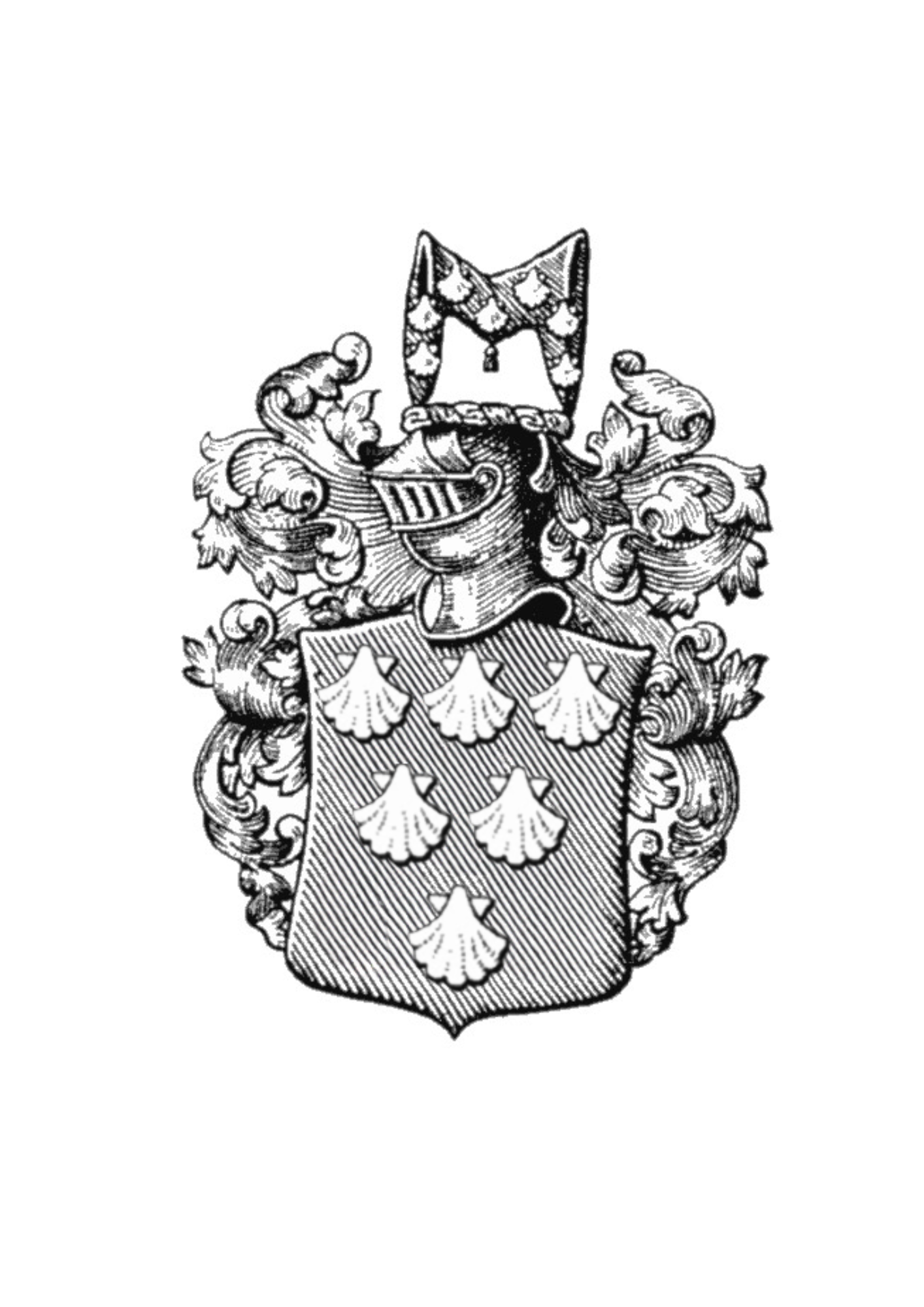
Holbeche Arms

== Family seats ==
=== Farnborough Hall ===
One of the family’s principal seats from the late seventeenth century was Farnborough Hall in Warwickshire. The estate was purchased by Ambrose Holbech in 1678. His son William Holbech made improvements to the house after returning from the Grand Tour, introducing paintings and decorative works, including Canaletto and Giovanni Paolo Panini.

The surrounding parkland was developed in the eighteenth century in the ferme ornée style, incorporating an obelisk, terrace walk and ornamental buildings. In 1960 Geoffrey Holbech transferred the estate to the National Trust, with members of the family continuing to occupy the house.

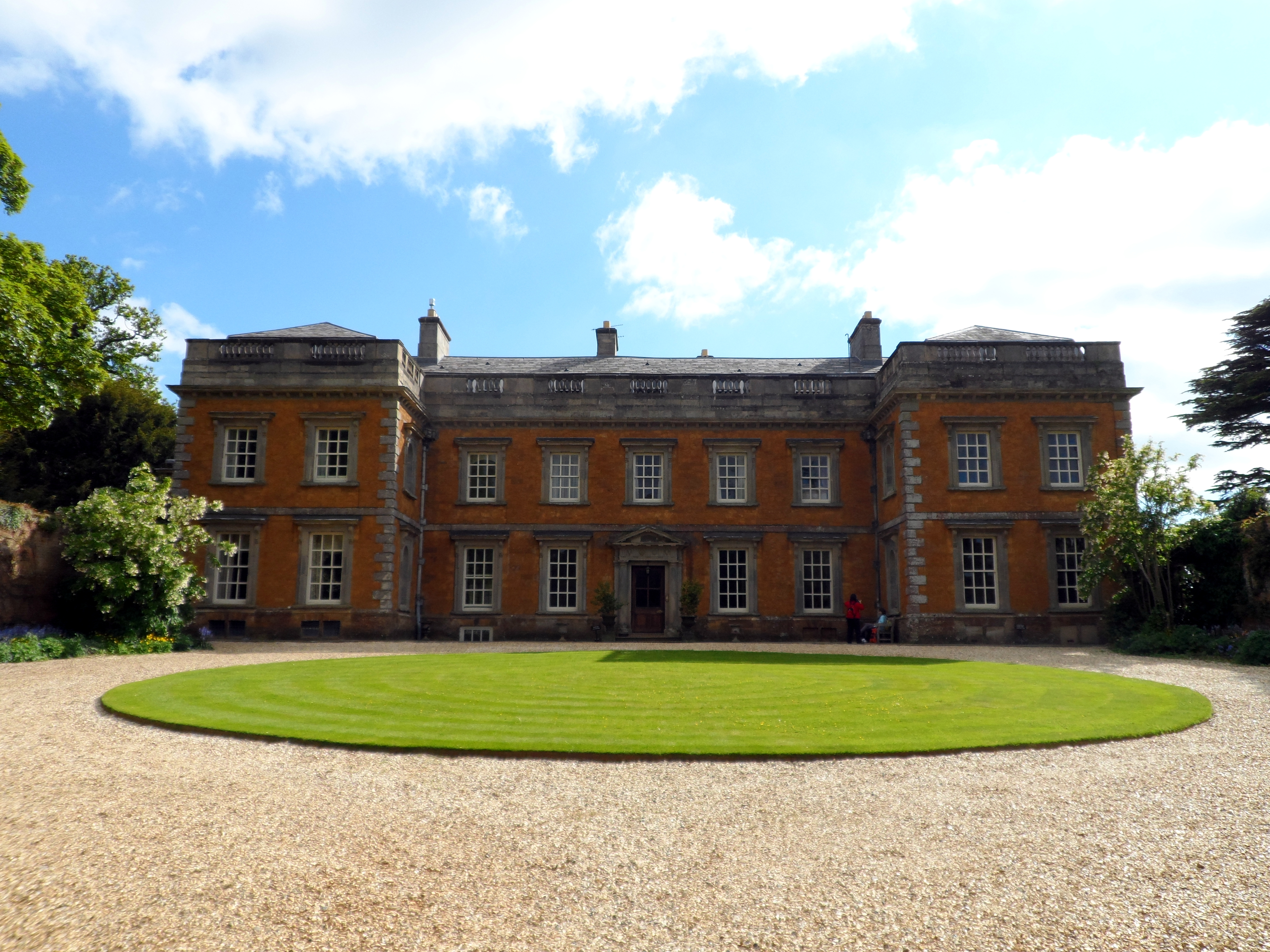
North side of Farnborough Hall, Warwickshire

=== Stoneleigh Abbey ===
A significant connection was formed in 1705 when Mary Holbeche, heiress of the Fillongley branch, married Edward Leigh, 3rd Baron Leigh of Stoneleigh Abbey. Through this marriage a number of Holbeche-associated lands passed into the Leigh estates, as recorded in holdings at the National Archives.

Major architectural work at Stoneleigh Abbey followed in the early eighteenth century, including the construction of the Baroque west wing attributed to Francis Smith of Warwick. The Abbey received several prominent visitors in later centuries, among them King Charles I, Queen Victoria and the novelist Jane Austen, who stayed at the house in 1806.

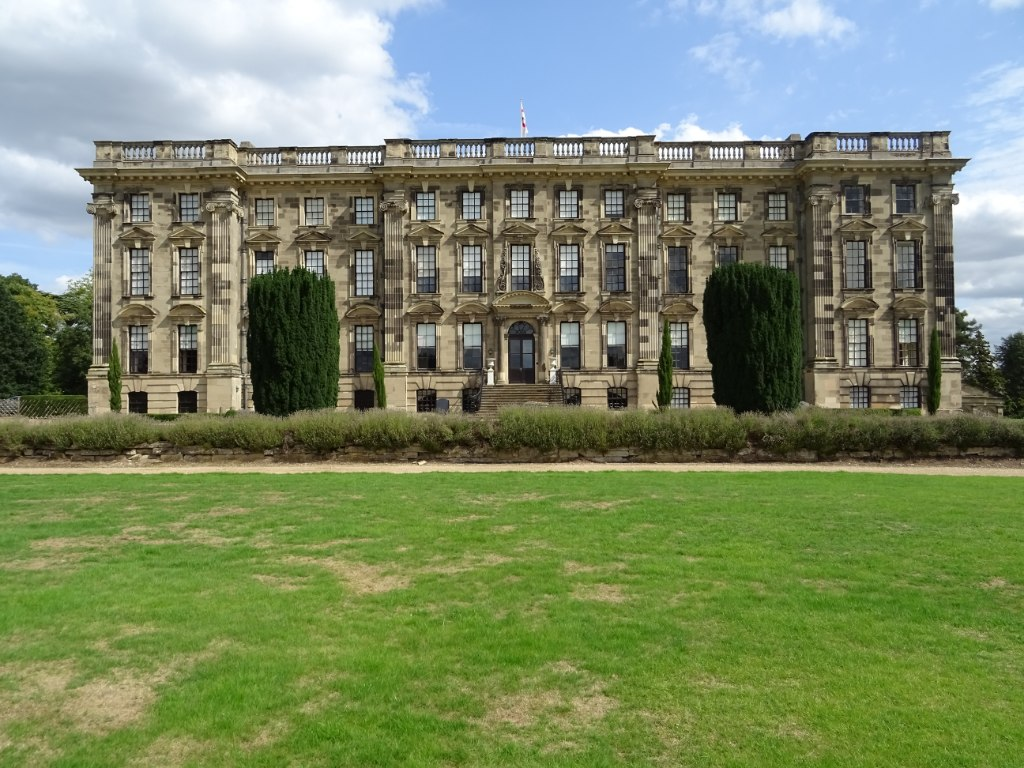
Stoneleigh Abbey from the grounds

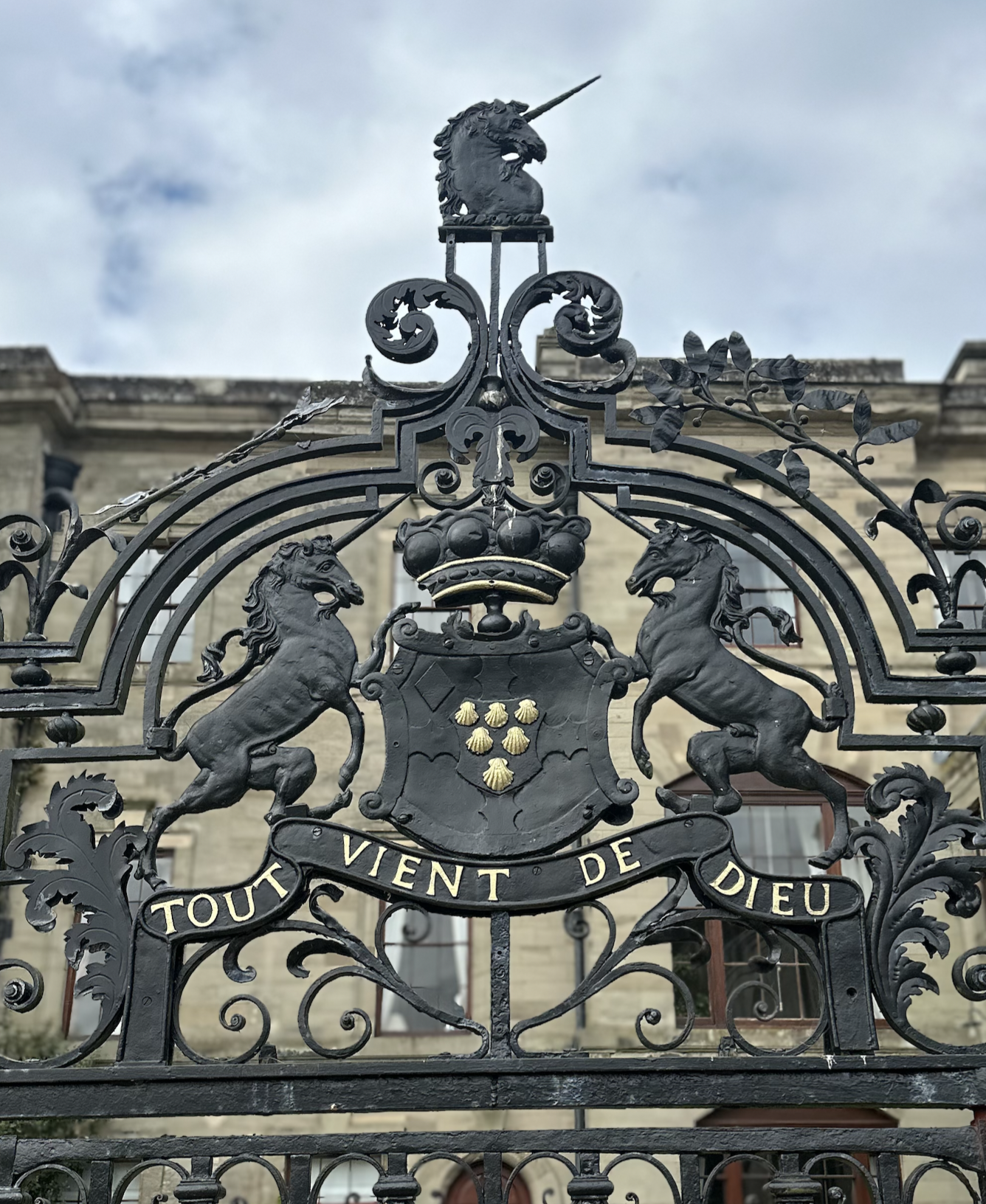
Holbeche And Baron Leigh Arms At Stoneleigh Abbey

== Notable members ==
- Thomas Holbech (1606–1680), Vice-chancellor, University of Cambridge. ]
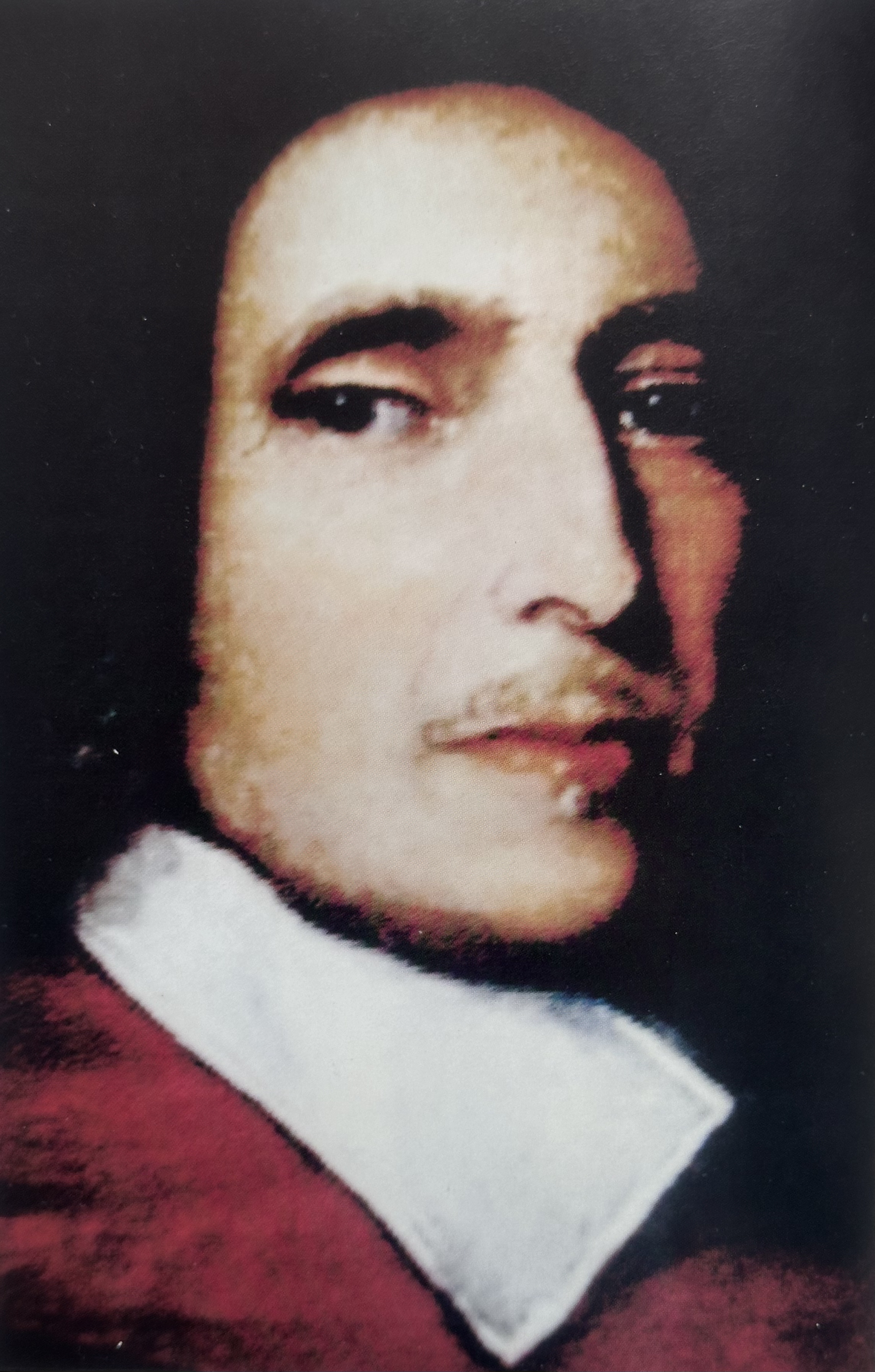
  Thomas Holbeche, Master of Emmanuel College and Vice-Chancellor of Cambridge
- William Holbech (1748–1812), Sheriff of Warwickshire, Member of Parliament for Banbury and landowner.
- Lady Mary Ann Holbech Mordaunt (c.1778–1842), amateur artist; her works are held in the Royal Collection Trust and the British Museum.
- Sir Thomas Leigh (c.1504–1571), Lord Mayor of London; linked to the family through the Leigh–Holbeche marriage line.
- Charles Holbech (1816-1901), Archdeacon of Coventry.
- William Holbech (1850-1930), Bishop of St. Helena in the South Atlantic for 25 years.
- William Holbech (1882-1914), cricketer, played for Warwickshire County Cricket Club and the Marylebone Cricket Club.

== Modern era ==
By the twentieth century, many of the historic estates of the various branches had been sold or passed into other lines. The Farnborough branch, however, remains associated with Farnborough Hall, where descendants continue to reside under National Trust stewardship of the wider property.
