= Holbech =

Holbech is a Germanic name, meaning "the low brook" or "the brook in the ravine or hollow".

== People ==
Notable people with the surname include:

- Charles Holbech (1816–1901), Archdeacon of Coventry from 1873 to 1887
- David Holbache or Holbech (c. 1355–1422/3), Welsh Member of Parliament, founder of Oswestry School
- Niels Peter Holbech, Danish portrait painter
- Thomas Holbech, Vice-Chancellor of Cambridge University in 1677, Master of Emmanuel College from 1676 to 1680
- William Holbech (MP for City of London) (fl. 1358–1367), English Member of Parliament for City of London
- William Holbech (MP for Banbury) (1748–1812), English Member of Parliament for Banbury
- William Holbech (bishop) (1850–1930), Bishop of St Helena, earlier Archdeacon of Kimberley and Dean of Bloemfontein
- William Holbech (cricketer) (1882–1914), English cricketer, killed in the First World War

== See also ==
- Holbæk, a town in Zealand, Denmark
- Holbeach, a town in Lincolnshire
- Holbeche House, a manor in Staffordshire
- Holbeck, a district of Leeds, Yorkshire
