= Cyril Morton =

Cyril Morton may refer to:

- Cyril Morton (priest) (1885–1932), Anglican priest
- Cyril James Morton (1903–1986), New Zealand filmmaker
- Cyril S. Morton (1885–1947), British clergyman and philatelist
