= William Holbech =

William Holbech may refer to:

- William Holbech (bishop) (1850–1930), Bishop of St Helena, earlier Archdeacon of Kimberley and Dean of Bloemfontein
- William Holbech (cricketer) (1882–1914), English cricketer, killed in the First World War
- William Holbech (MP for Banbury) (1748–1812), English member of parliament, for Banbury, Oxon.
- William Holbech (MP for City of London), represented City of London
