= Dean of Coventry =

Church of England senior clergy member

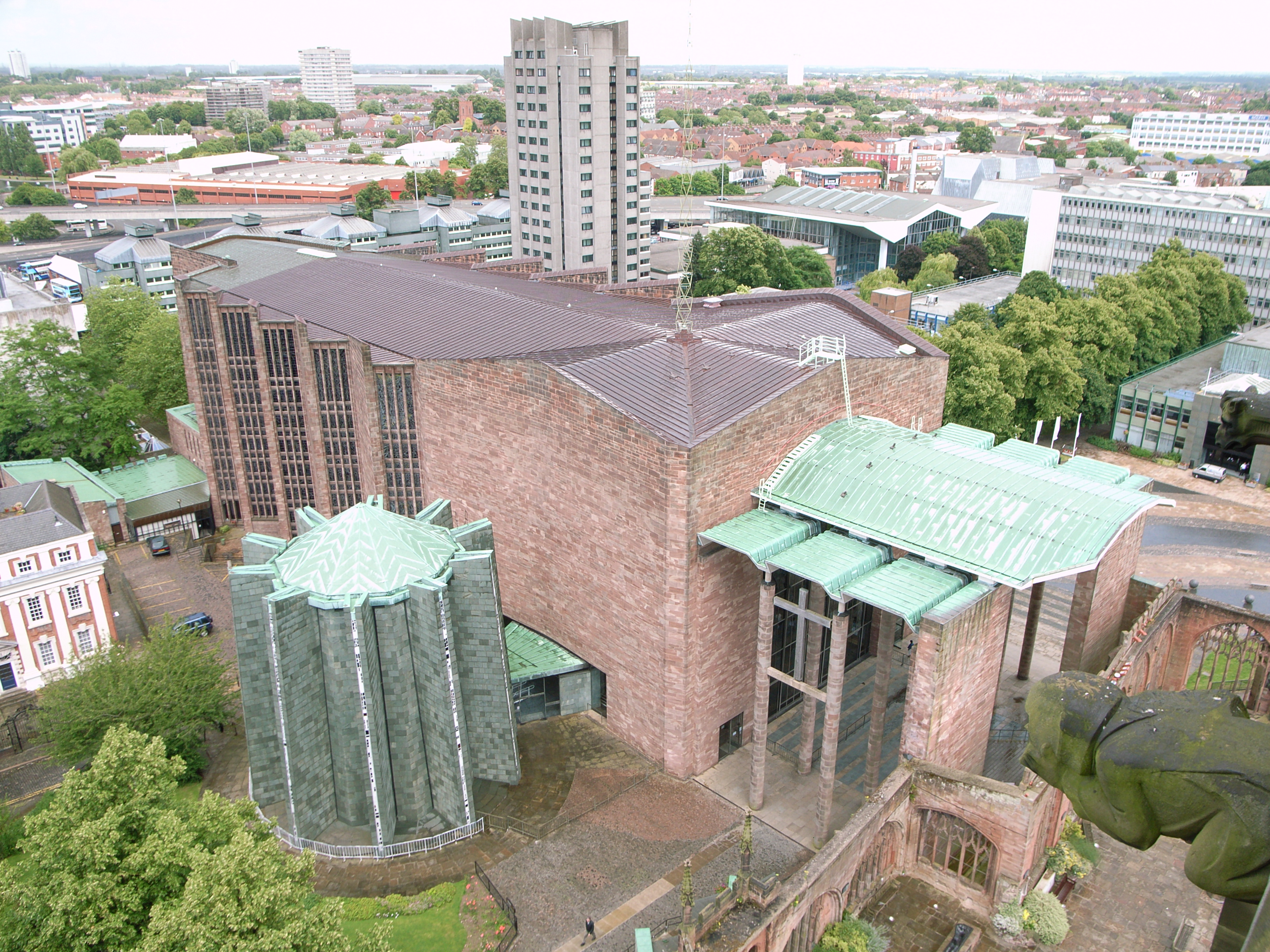
Coventry Cathedral

The Dean of Coventry is based at Coventry Cathedral in the West Midlands, UK and is the head of the Chapter at the cathedral, which was created in 1918 from the parish church of St Michael. The current dean is John Witcombe.

Prior to appointment of the first dean the function was carried out by a sub-dean or a provost.

== List of incumbents ==
=== Sub-Deans ===
- 1918–1922 William Haighton Chappel
- 1922–1923 Harry Woollcombe
- 1924–1929 St Barbe Holland
- 1929–1931 Cyril Morton (became Provost)

=== Provosts ===
- 1931–1932 Cyril Morton
- 1933–1958 Richard Howard
- 1958–1981 Harold Williams
- 1982–1987 Colin Semper
- 1988–2000 John Petty

=== Deans ===
- 2000–2000 John Petty (for 9 days)
- 2000–2001 Stuart Beake (Acting Dean)
- 2001–2012 John Irvine
- 2012-2013 Tim Pullen (Acting Dean)
- 2013–present John Witcombe (retire scheduled for effective 31 May 2026)
