= Riland =

Riland is a surname. Notable people with the surname include:

- John Riland (died 1673), English Anglican priest of the 17th century
- W. Kenneth Riland (1912–1989), American osteopathic physician

== See also ==
- Hiland (given name)
- Roland (name)
