= Hugh Back =

Hugh Cairns Alexander Back (20 August 1863 – 27 December 1928) was an English Anglican priest, Archdeacon of Warwick from 1923 until his death.

== Life ==
He was born at Berkswell, the son of the Rev. Samuel Back and his first wife Elizabeth Ann Robinson. He matriculated at Trinity College, Cambridge in 1882, graduating B.A. in 1885, M.A. 1889.

Back was ordained deacon in 1887, and priest in 1888. His began his career with curacies at Ulverston and Kidderminster. He was Rector of Brandiston from 1892 to 1897; Vicar of Rostherne from 1897 to 1903; Rector of Berkswell from 1903 to 1924; and Rector of Hampton Lucy from 1924 until his death.

== Family ==
Back married in 1892 Maud Ellen Fletcher, daughter of Col. Henry Charles Fletcher of the Scots Guards and his wife Lady Harriet Marsham, daughter of Charles Marsham, 3rd Earl of Romney, of Kenward, Kent. They had a son and a daughter.

Church of England titles
Preceded by Claude Blagden	Archdeacon of Warwick; 1983–1990	Succeeded by Herbert St Barbe Holland
