= Buckeridge =

Buckeridge is a surname. Notable people with the surname include:

- Anthony Buckeridge (1912–2004), English author
- Charles Buckeridge (priest) (1756–1827), Archdeacon of Coventry
- Charles Buckeridge (c. 1832–1873), British architect
- Charles Edgar Buckeridge (1864–1898), British church decorative artist
- John Buckeridge (c. 1562–1631), English churchman
- John H. Buckeridge (1857–1934), Australian architect
- Len Buckeridge (1936–2014), Australian businessman

== See also ==
- BGC (company), formerly Buckeridge Group of Companies
