= Michael Paget-Wilkes =

English Anglican priest (1941–2026)

Michael Jocelyn James Paget-Wilkes (11 December 1941 – 9 April 2026) was an English Anglican cleric who was Archdeacon of Warwick from 1990 to 2009.

== Biography ==
Paget-Wilkes was born in Bath, Somerset on 11 December 1941, the son of the Rev. Arthur Hamilton Paget Wilkes and grandson of missionary Paget Wilkes. He was educated at Harper Adams Agricultural College and was an Agricultural Project manager in Tanzania from 1964 to 1966. He studied for ordination at the London College of Divinity; and was priested in 1970. After a curacy at All Saints', Wandsworth, 1969–74 he was Vicar of St James' New Cross from 1974 to 1982; and then St Matthew, Rugby until his appointment as Archdeacon. He also wrote The Church and Rural Development (1968); Poverty, Revolution and the Church (1981).

Paget-Wilkes died on 9 April 2026, aged 74.

Church of England titles
Preceded by Peter Bridges	Archdeacon of Warwick; 1990–2009	Succeeded by Morris Rodham
