= George Arbuthnot (priest) =

George Arbuthnot, DD ( 24 May 1846 – 9 November 1922) was Archdeacon of Coventry from 1908 until his death in 1922.

Arbuthnot was born in Loanhead and educated at Eton College and Christ Church, Oxford. He was ordained in 1872, and was curate at St Nicholas, Arundel until 1873, when he became its vicar. In 1879 he became the incumbent at Stratford upon Avon.

Church of England titles
| Preceded by William Bree | Archdeacon of Coventry; 1908–1922 | Succeeded by Claude Blagden |
