= Francis Walsall =

English priest

Francis Walsall was a priest in England during the 17th century.

Walsall was educated at Corpus Christi College, Cambridge, and was incorporated at Oxford in 1642. He held livings at Great Wigborough and Sandy. He was Archdeacon of Coventry from 1642 to 1661; and Prebendary of Westminster from 1660 to 1661.

Church of England titles
Preceded by Ralph Brownrigg	Archdeacon of Coventry; 1643–1661	Succeeded by John Riland
