= Algernon Ward =

Algernon Ward, FRSL, FRGS, FSA Scot (1869–1947) was an Anglican priest and author.

He was the son Robert Ward sometime vicar of Ashby Puerorum he was educated at Queen Elizabeth's Grammar School, Horncastle and Corpus Christi College, Cambridge. He was ordained deacon in 1892; and Priest in 1893. After curacies in Coventry and Edgbaston he was divinity lecturer at Queen's College, Birmingham from 1897 to 1902. He was chaplain at St Mark, Alexandria from 1902 to 1915 and Vicar of Sturminster Newton from then until 1922. he was vicar of Stowe, Shropshire from 1922 to 1926; rector of Church Lawford with Newnham Regis from 1922 to 1936 and archdeacon of Warwick from 1936 to 1945.

He died on 9 July 1947.

Church of England titles
Preceded by Herbert St Barbe Holland	Archdeacon of Warwick; 1936–1945	Succeeded by Malcolm Parr
