= Edward Taylor (priest) =

Edward Taylor (31 October 1921 – 24 October 1982) was Archdeacon of Warwick from 1974 until his death.

== Education ==
Taylor was educated at King's College London and St Boniface College, Warminster. Career

== Army Service ==
=== During World War Two ===
Taylor joined the British Army in 1940. He was an officer in the 14th Punjab Regiment from 1942 to 1945.

=== After World War Two ===
In 1946 he was appointed an honorary Captain in the Duke of Wellington's Regiment.

== Early career ==
Taylor was ordained Deacon in 1949, and Priest in 1950. After a curacy in Diss he was Vicar of St Paul, Stockingford from 1951 to 1957 then St Nicholas, Radford, Coventry from 1957 to 1964.

=== Later posts ===
He was Rector of Spernall with Morton Bagot and Oldberrow from 1965 to 1974; Priest in charge of Coughton with Sambourne from 1965 to 1974 (Vicar, 1970 to 1974. In 1975 he became Vicar of Sherbourne, Warwickshire, and lived at The Archdeacon's House there until his death.

Church of England titles
Preceded by Jesse Heighton Proctor	Archdeacon of Warwick; 1983–1990	Succeeded by Peter Sydney Godfrey Bridges
