= James Peile =

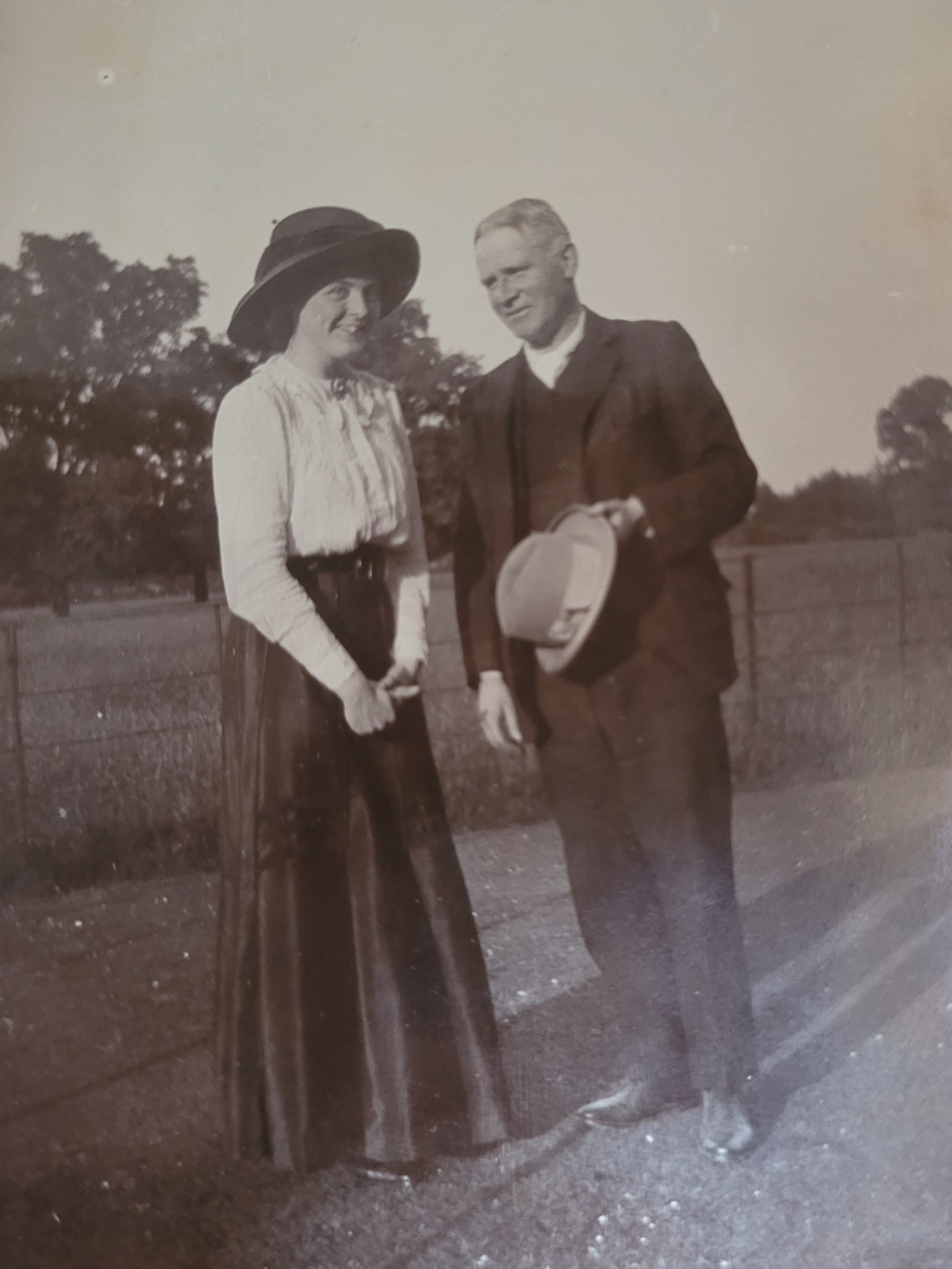
Rev JHF Peile & his wife Margaret

James Hamilton Francis Peile (2 August 1863 – 4 April 1940 was an eminent Anglican priest in the first half of the twentieth century.

Peile was educated at Harrow and matriculated at Corpus Christi College, Oxford in 1882, graduating B.A. in 1886; and was ordained in 1898. After some years as a school teacher he returned to Oxford in 1900 as a Fellow of University College, and in June 1902 he was appointed Lecturer in Divinity and assistant chaplain at Corpus Christi College. In 1907, Peiles work "The Reproach of the Gospel: An Inquiry Into the Apparent Failure of Christianity As a General Rule of Life and Conduct, with Special Reference to the Present Time" was published. From 1907 until 1910 he was Vicar of All Saints, Ennismore Gardens. In that year he became Archdeacon of Warwick, a post he held until 1921 when he took up a similar role at Worcester. He retired in 1938. Married Margaret Hester Drummond on 7 February 1911. Margaret died on 20 February 1940 only a few weeks before Peile himself in April the same year.

Church of England titles
Preceded by Inaugural appointment	Archdeacon of Warwick; 1910–1921	Succeeded by Claude Martin Blagden
Preceded by John Harold Greig	Archdeacon of Worcester; 1921–1938	Succeeded by Charles Ridley Duppuy
