= Malcolm Parr =

Ven. Malcolm Parr (21 March 1888 – 15 July 1962) was Archdeacon of Warwick from 1945 until 1958.

Parr was born in Cannes, France. He was educated at the University of London and Ridley Hall, Cambridge; and ordained in 1915. After a curacy in Great Yarmouth he was the Vicar of Bishop Latimer Memorial Church, Winson Green from 1922 to 1926. He was the incumbent at St Nicholas, Radford, Coventry from 1926 to 1929 and of Holy Trinity, Leamington Spa until his appointment as Archdeacon.

Church of England titles
| Preceded by Algernon Ward | Archdeacon of Warwick; 1945–1958 | Succeeded by Jesse Heighton Proctor |
