= Leonard Stanford =

Leonard John Stanford (26 September 1896 – 20 November 1967) was Archdeacon of Coventry from 1946 to 1965.

Stanford was born in Islington. During the First World War he served with various London regiments, and was attached to the North Staffordshire Regiment. He was wounded on the Somme and spent 18 months recovering in hospital. In 1919 he became a student at Merton College, Oxford, graduating in 1922, and going on to study at Cuddesdon Theological College. He was ordained as a priest in 1926. After a curacy in Royston he was Priest in charge of Brierley until 1931, then Rector of, Norton Lindsey from 1931 to 1940; Vicar of Newbold-on-Avon from 1940 to 1947 (during which time he was an honorary Chaplain in the RAF from 1941 to 1945); Rector of Bilton from 1947 to 1959; and, finally, Great with Little Packington from 1959 to 1966.

Stanford was married twice: in 1927 to Dora Kathleen Timms (she died in 1939), with whom he had three sons and a daughter; and in 1941 to Hilda Kathleen Cooke.

Church of England titles
Preceded by Richard Thomas Howard	Archdeacon of Coventry; 1946–1965	Succeeded by Eric Ancrum Buchan
