= John Irvine (priest) =

British Anglican priest (1949–2025)

John Dudley Irvine (2 January 1949 – 11 October 2025) was a British Anglican priest.

== Biography ==
Irvine was born on 2 January 1949, the son of former Labour MP and Solicitor General Sir Arthur Irvine, QC and the brother of Michael Irvine, a former Conservative Party MP for Ipswich. He was educated at Haileybury and studied law at the University of Sussex, later studying theology at Wycliffe Hall, Oxford.

He was a barrister in London before his ordination to the priesthood. He served a curacy at Holy Trinity Brompton and was one of the founders of the Alpha course. Having taken charge of the Alpha course, he played a major part in transforming it from its original four-week form to its current 10-week form.

In 1985 Irvine led the first "church plant" from HTB to St Barnabas Kensington.

Irvine was appointed Dean of Coventry in March 2001. He retired on 29 July 2012. He was then associate vicar at Holy Trinity Church, Cambridge from September 2012 until 2016, and remained until his death Dean Emeritus of Coventry.

Irvine died on 11 October 2025, at the age of 76.

== Styles ==
- The Reverend John Irvine (1981–2001)
- The Very Reverend John Irvine (2001–2025)

Church of England titles
Preceded by John Petty	Dean of Coventry; 2001–2012	Succeeded by John Witcombe
