= Morris Rodham =

Anglican priest (born 1959)

Morris Rodham (born 1959) is an Anglican priest who served as Archdeacon Missioner (Archdeacon of Warwick) in the Diocese of Coventry 2010–2019.

Rodham was educated at Durham University, graduating with a degree in classics as a member of Hatfield College in 1982. He later studied for a PGCE at St John's College, Durham, graduating in 1985. He further studied at Trinity College, Bristol; was ordained deacon in 1993; and priest in 1994.

After a curacy in New Milverton he was vicar of St Mary, Leamington Priors (1997–2010) until his appointment as Archdeacon Missioner in 2010. He resigned the archdeaconry upon his induction as priest-in-charge of Patterdale on 19 June 2019.

Church of England titles
Preceded by Michael Paget-Wilkes	Archdeacon of Warwick; 2010–2019	Succeeded by Barry Dugmore
