= John Witcombe =

British Anglican priest (born 1959)

John Julian Witcombe (born 1 March 1959) is a British Anglican priest. He is the Dean of Coventry in the Church of England.

== Ministry ==
After ordination in 1984, he served in Birtley, County Durham before moving to be the team Vicar of St Barnabas, Inham Nook, Nottingham. He was then vicar of St Luke’s, Lodge Moor, Sheffield the Team Rector in Uxbridge and later Dean of St John's College, Nottingham. Before his appointment as Dean of Coventry, Witcombe was the Diocese of Gloucester's Diocesan Director of Ordinands and then Director of Discipleship and Ministry, and a Residentiary Canon at Gloucester Cathedral. He is a former member of General Synod and formerly a national advisor for selecting potential clergy for the Church of England. He was installed as Dean of Coventry on 19 January 2013. He has announced his intention to retire effective 31 May 2026.

== Personal life ==
John is married to Ricarda, who is also a priest, and hospital chaplain. They married in 2000 after the death of his first wife Maureen Edwards (also a priest). John has one son and two daughters with his first wife Maureen, and two step daughters with his second wife Ricarda.

== Honours ==
Witcombe was awarded honorary doctorate from Warwick University (2022). He was awarded honorary doctorate from Coventry University (2023).

== Styles ==
- The Reverend John Witcombe (1984–2009)
- The Reverend Canon John Witcombe (2009–2013)
- The Very Reverend John Witcombe (2013–present)

== Works ==
- Editor of The Curate's Guide: From calling to first parish (Church House Publishing 2005) ISBN 9780715142035
- Author with John Leach of Grove books Hanging on to God: sustaining ministry in the renewal tradition (Grove Books, 2008) ISBN 978 1 85174 693 4
- Author with John Leach and Mark Tanner of Grove Books Renewing the Traditional Church (Grove Books, 2005) ISBN 1851745130

Church of England titles
Preceded by John Irvine	Dean of Coventry; 2013–present	Incumbent
