= Charles Holbech =

The Rev. Charles William Holbech, J.P. (born Farnborough, Warwickshire 1816; died 1901) was Archdeacon of Coventry from 1873 until 1887.

He was a descendant of William Holbech. The Holbech family owned Farnborough Hall, near Farnborough, Warwickshire. Holbech was educated at Eton and Balliol College, Oxford. He was ordained in 1840, and was curate at Chelsfield until 1842; and Vicar of Farnborough, Warwickshire from 1842 to 1896.

He died on 20 March 1901.

His third son was the Rt. Rev. William Holbech and his grandson was William Holbech.

Church of England titles
Preceded by John Sandford	Archdeacon of Coventry; 1873–1887	Succeeded by William Bree
