= Spencer Leeson =

British headmaster and Anglican bishop

Spencer Stottisbury Gwatkin Leeson (9 October 1892 - 27 January 1956) was an eminent headmaster and Anglican bishop in the mid 20th century.

== Life ==
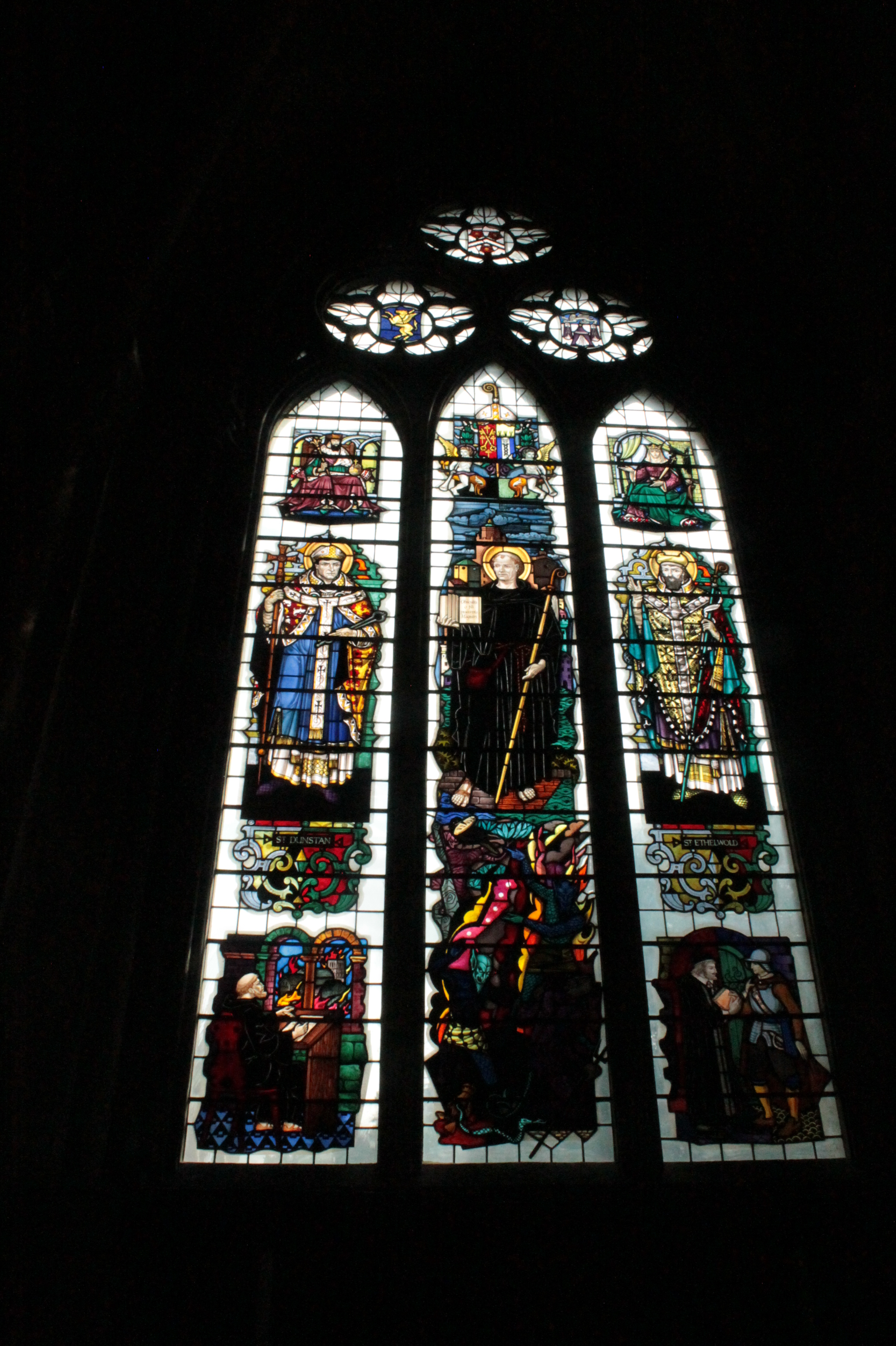
Memorial window to Leeson, Peterborough Cathedral

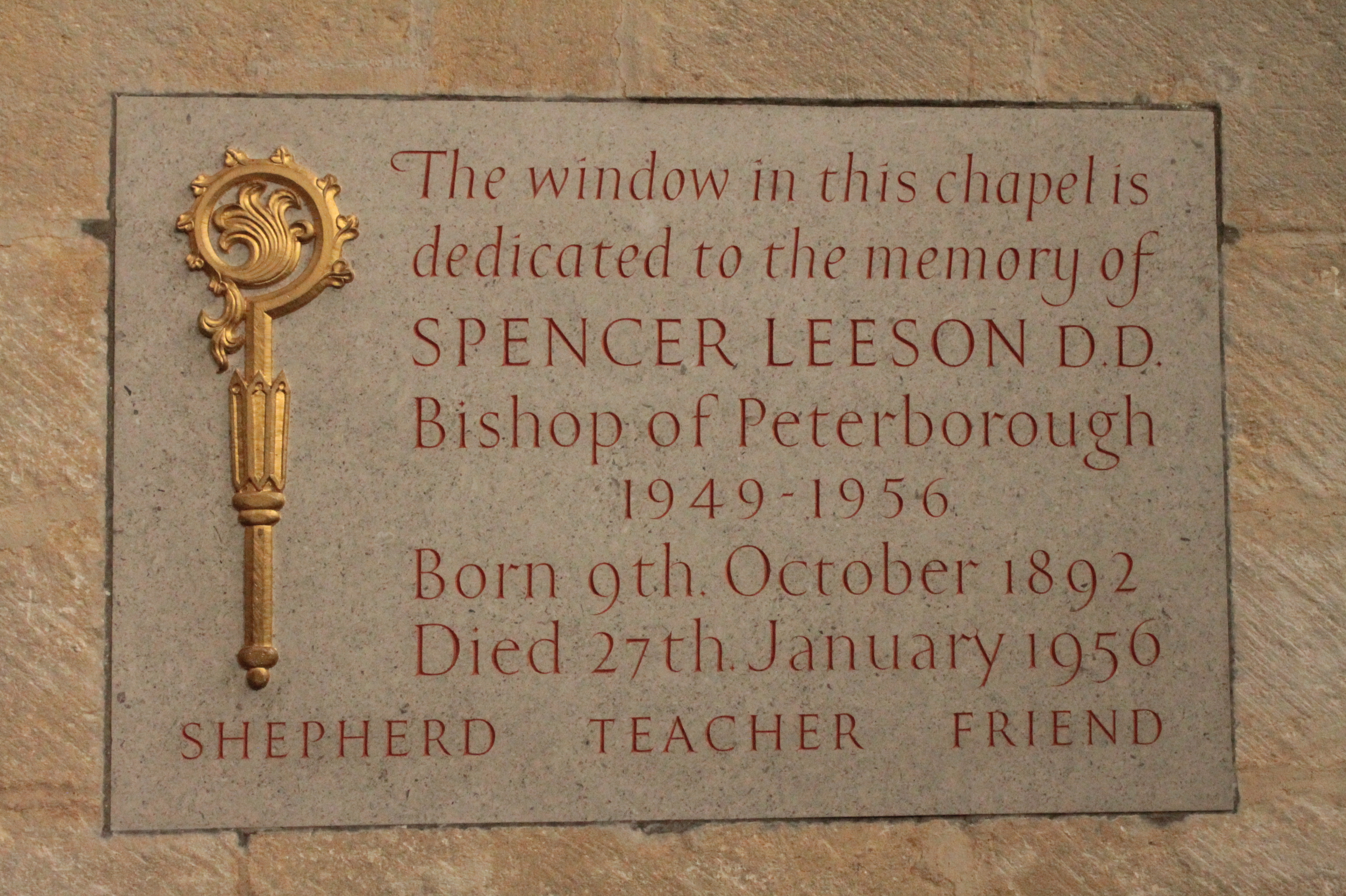
Plaque to Leeson in Peterborough Cathedral

He was born on 9 October 1892 and educated at Winchester and New College, Oxford. Although he had just been awarded a 1st in classical moderations and was on his way to further academic distinction, he enlisted in the army in August 1914, soon after the outbreak of the First World War. He was commissioned into the Middlesex Regiment and his first posting was to Gibraltar, where he gained the rare experience of guarding German-American prisoners who had been intercepted whilst attempting to reach Germany. In March 1915, he was sent to Ypres but returned to England with influenza. He was in hospital when his battalion was in action, with over 500 casualties. In September 1915, unfit for active service, he was attached to Naval Intelligence Division of the Admiralty and MI5. He was mentioned in despatches, gazetted in May 1917. He had lengthy periods of absence resulting from a heart problem.

Post-war, he was assistant principal at the Board of Education then an assistant master at his old school. He was appointed headmaster of Merchant Taylors' in 1927, then Winchester College eight years later. He was made deacon at Michaelmas 1939 (22 September) in the Wolvesey Palace chapel and ordained priest on Trinity Sunday 1940 (19 May) at Winchester Cathedral — both times by Cyril Garbett, Bishop of Winchester. He was Rector of St. Mary's Church, Southampton and then Wiccamical Prebendary at Chichester Cathedral. Leeson had made such an immediate impression in Southampton that he was recommended for bishoprics. Added to that was his national reputation as an authority on education, particularly Church schools. Wakefield, Hereford and Peterborough dioceses all became vacant in 1949, and Leeson was eventually appointed to Peterborough. He was ordained and consecrated a bishop that All Saints' Day (1 November) at Westminster Abbey by Geoffrey Fisher, Archbishop of Canterbury; and held this post until his death on 27 January 1956. By then, his hyperactivity and zeal had damaged his health, so that when Archbishop Garbett of York announced his retirement in 1955, Leeson was not in the running. Nevertheless, during the previous six years at Peterborough, Leeson was one of the most eminent Church of England bishops. He was an influential and popular figure in the Church of England in the early 1950s and if he had lived longer might have become an archbishop.

== Memorials ==
A memorial stained glass window was erected in the south aisle of Peterborough Cathedral to his memory.

Church of England titles
Preceded by Claude Blagden	Bishop of Peterborough; 1949–1956	Succeeded by Robert Stopford
Academic offices
Preceded by Alwyn Williams	Headmaster of Winchester College; 1934–1946	Succeeded by Walter Oakeshott
