= Eric Buchan =

British Anglican archdeacon

Eric Ancrum Buchan
- Born: 6 November 1907; Clifton, Bristol
- Died: 27 April 2001 (aged 93)
- Occupation: Coventry

Eric Ancrum Buchan (6 November 1907 in Clifton, Bristol – 27 April 2001 in Lingfield, Surrey) was Archdeacon of Coventry from 1965 to 1977.

Buchan was born in Bristol and educated at the city's grammar school. Following a commission in the RAF he studied at St Chad's College, Durham and was ordained in 1934. After a curacy at Holy Nativity, Knowle, Bristol he became a wartime chaplain in the RAFVR. He was Vicar of St Mark's with St Barnabas, Coventry from 1945 to 1959; Rural Dean of Coventry from 1954 to 1963; and Rector of Baginton from 1963 to 1970. He was awarded the Silver Acorn for outstanding services to the Scout Movement in 1974.

Church of England titles
Preceded by Leonard John Stanford	Archdeacon of Coventry; 1965–1977	Succeeded by Peter Sydney Godfrey Bridges
