= Archdeacon of Warwick =

Church of England ecclesiastical office

The Archdeacon of Warwick (now called Archdeacon Missioner) is the senior ecclesiastical officer in charge of the archdeaconry of Warwick in the Diocese of Coventry. The Archdeaconry of Warwick has five Deaneries which centre on Warwick and Leamington Spa, Alcester, Stratford upon Avon, Shipston and Southam.

== History ==
The archdeaconry was originally created, on 10 January 1910, from the Archdeaconry of Worcester, and in the Diocese of Worcester (consisting of the rural deaneries of Alcester, of Blockley, of Evesham, of Feckenham, of North Kineton, of South Kineton, of Pershore, and of Warwick). Since 2009 the post has been redefined and renamed as Archdeacon Missioner. From the retirement of Michael Paget-Wilkes in 2009, the Archdeacon of Coventry also had statutory oversight over the Archdeaconry of Warwick, delegated from the Archdeacon Missioner, in preparation for the merging of the two archdeaconries, until that post was replaced by that of Archdeacon Pastor. Rodham and Green remained, legally, collated to the Archdeaconries of Warwick and of Coventry.

== List of archdeacons ==
The archdeaconry was created in Worcester diocese in 1910.

- 1910 – 1921 (res.): James Peile, Rector of Great Comberton (until 1917), then Rector of Alvechurch (became Archdeacon of Worcester)

In 1918, the archdeaconries of Warwick and of Coventry were erected into the new Coventry diocese.

- 1920 – 1923 (res.): Claude Blagden (became Archdeacon of Coventry)
- 1923 – 27 December 1928 (d.): Hugh Back, Rector of Berkswell (until 1924), then Rector of Hampton-Lucy
- 1929 – 1936 (res.): St Barbe Holland, Rector of Hampton Lucy (became Bishop of Wellington)
- 1936 – 1945 (ret.): Algernon Ward, Rector of Hampton Lucy
- 1945 – 30 April 1958 (ret.): Malcolm Parr
- 1958–1974: Jesse Proctor, Vicar of Sherbourne (until 1969; afterwards archdeacon emeritus)
- 1974 – 24 October 1982 (d.): Edward Taylor, Vicar of Sherbourne (until 1977)
- 1983 – 1990 (ret.): Peter Bridges (afterwards archdeacon emeritus)
- 1990 – 2009 (ret.): Michael Paget-Wilkes
- 2010 – 19 June 2019 (res.): Morris Rodham (Archdeacon Missioner)
- 6 October 2019 – present: Barry Dugmore (Archdeacon Missioner)
