= Bill Williams (priest) =

Harold Claude Noel Williams (6 December 1914 – 5 April 1990), commonly known as H. C. N. Williams or Bill Williams, was an Anglican priest and author.

Williams was born in Grahamstown, South Africa and educated at Graeme College (South Africa) and Durham University, where he was a Theological Exhibitioner at Hatfield College.

He was ordained in 1938 and began his ministry as a curate at St Mary with St Paul's Weeke near Winchester in England. From 1941 to 1949 he was Principal of St Matthew's College in South Africa. He then returned to England and held incumbencies at St Bartholomew's Hyde, Winchester and St Mary's, Southampton. In 1958 he became Provost of the Cathedral Church of St Michael, Coventry, a position he held for 23 years.

== Writings ==
- African Folk Songs, 1948
- Vision of Duty, 1963
- Twentieth Century Cathedral: An Examination of the Role of Cathedrals in the Strategy of the Church in the Changing Pattern of a Twentieth Century Community, 1964
- Coventry Cathedral and its Ministry, 1965
- Coventry Cathedral in Action, 1968
- Basics and Variables: The Future of the Church in the Modern World, 1970
- The Latter Glory: The Story of Coventry Cathedral, 1978
- Order My Steps in Thy Way, 1982
- Building A Community, 1990 (publ.2012)

Church of England titles
Preceded by Richard Thomas Howard	Provost of Coventry Cathedral; 1958–1981	Succeeded by Colin Douglas Semper
