= William Bree =

Anglican Archdeacon (1822–1917)

William Bree ( 19 November 1822 – 28 January 1917) was Archdeacon of Coventry from 1887 until 1908.

The son of The Rev William Thomas Bree, MA, Rector of Allesley he was educated at Bridgnorth Endowed School and Merton College, Oxford. He was ordained in 1848, and was curate at Polebrook until 1863, when he succeeded his father at Allesley. He married firstly, in 1853, Mary Duke; and, secondly, Sophy Adèle Biggs. His great nephew, the actor James Bree, was patron of the benefice until his death in 2008.

Church of England titles
Preceded by Charles Holbech	Archdeacon of Coventry; 1887–1908	Succeeded by George Arbuthnot
