= William Holbech (cricketer) =

English cricketer and British Army officer (1882–1914)

Personal information
- Born: 18 August 1882; Murray Bay, Quebec, Canada
- Died: 1 November 1914 (aged 32); Greenwich, Kent, England
- Batting: Right-handed
- Relatives: Lord Waleran (uncle)

Domestic team information
- Years: Team
- 1908–1909: Marylebone Cricket Club (MCC)
- 1910: Warwickshire

Career statistics
Competition	FC
Matches	3
Runs scored	28
Batting average	4.66
100s/50s	0/0
Top score	21
Catches/stumpings	1/–
- Source: CricketArchive, 27 December 2014

William Hugh Holbech (18 August 1882 – 1 November 1914) was an English cricketer who played at first-class level for Warwickshire and the Marylebone Cricket Club (MCC). He died of wounds following the First Battle of Ypres.

Holbech was born in Quebec in 1882, in Murray Bay (now known as La Malbaie). His father, Lt.-Col. Walter Holbech of the King's Royal Rifle Corps, was on active duty at the time of his birth. The Holbech family owned Farnborough Hall, near Farnborough, Warwickshire, and Holbech's paternal grandfather, Charles Holbech, was Archdeacon of Coventry from 1873 to 1887, while his paternal uncle, William Holbech was Bishop of St Helena from 1903 to 1929. His maternal grandfather, Sir John Walrond, Bt., was MP for Tiverton, in east Devon. John Walrond's son, William Walrond (later raised to the peerage as Baron Waleran), and grandson, The Hon. William Walrond, both later represented the same constituency, with the latter also killed in the First World War. William Holbech was educated at Eton College, going on to the Royal Military College, Sandhurst. He was made a second lieutenant in the Scots Guards in January 1902, and promoted lieutenant in March 1904, passing into the reserve in February 1907.

An MCC member, Holbech made his first-class debut for an MCC side in June 1908, against Cambridge University. He had earlier played non-first-class matches for the MCC and for Sandhurst. A right-handed batsman, Holbech played once more the MCC the following season, against Oxford University. He scored 21 runs in the MCC's second innings in that match, his highest first-class score. He also appeared once for Warwickshire, against Hampshire in the 1910 County Championship, but with little success. In August 1914, at the outbreak of the First World War, Holbech rejoined the 2nd Battalion of the Scots Guards, stationed at the Tower of London. The battalion was attached to the 20th Brigade of the 7th Division, landing at Zeebrugge in early October 1914. Holbech reached the frontline on 18 October, participating in the First Battle of Ypres. A week later, he was shot in the thigh, and severely wounded. He was repatriated to London, but died at the Royal Herbert Hospital in Greenwich on 1 November, after his wound became septic. Holbech was buried at St Botolph churchyard, following a lavish funeral at Farnborough Hall.

== See also ==
- List of cricketers who were killed during military service
- List of Warwickshire County Cricket Club players
