= Mark Bryant (bishop) =

British Anglican bishop (born 1949)

The Right Reverend Mark Bryant
- Bishop of Jarrow
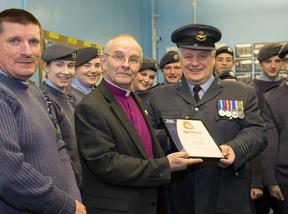
- Bishop Bryant being awarded a certificate by the Air Training Corps for his role in ATC chaplaincy
- Church: Church of England
- Diocese: Diocese of Durham
- In office: 2007–2018
- Predecessor: John Pritchard
- Other post: Archdeacon of Coventry (2001–2007)

Orders
- Ordination: 29 June 1975 (deacon); 27 June 1976 (priest) by David Brown
- Consecration: 13 September 2007 by John Sentamu

Personal details
- Born: 8 October 1949 (age 77)
- Denomination: Anglican
- Spouse: (m. 1976)
- Children: three
- Education: Durham University

Mark Watts Bryant (born 8 October 1949) is a retired British Anglican bishop. From 2007 to 2018 he was the Bishop of Jarrow, the suffragan bishop of the Diocese of Durham in the Church of England.

== Early life ==
Bryant was born on 8 October 1949 and educated at St John's School, Leatherhead. He went on to study at St John's College, Durham University, whence he graduated with a Bachelor of Arts (BA) degree in 1972, and then trained for the ordained ministry at Cuddesdon College for three years.

== Ordained ministry ==
Bryant was made a deacon at Petertide 1975 (29 June), and ordained a priest the Petertide following (27 June 1976), both times by David Brown, Bishop of Guildford, at Guildford Cathedral. He served his title (curacy) at Addlestone, Surrey from 1975, and moved to Upper Studley, Trowbridge, Wiltshire in 1979, serving as chaplain to Trowbridge College and licensed as an assistant priest at St John the Evangelist, Studley. He was then vicar of that parish from 1983 until his move to Warwickshire in 1988 to become Vocational Development Adviser and Diocesan Director of Ordinands (DDO; head of the Vocations and Training department) for the Diocese of Coventry. Additionally, from 1993 to 2001 he was an honorary canon of Coventry Cathedral. In 1996, he moved to become Team Rector of the Caludon Team Ministry, covering the Coventry suburbs of Stoke, Stoke Aldermoor and Wyken, becoming also Area Dean of East Coventry from 1999. He was Archdeacon of Coventry from 2001 to 2007 and, from 2006, also a Canon Residentiary of Coventry Cathedral.

=== Episcopal ministry ===
In 2007, Bryant was appointed to become Bishop of Jarrow, the sole suffragan bishop of the Diocese of Durham. He was consecrated as a bishop by John Sentamu, Archbishop of York, in York Minster on 13 September 2007, and welcomed to the diocese in a special service in Durham Cathedral on 16 September 2007. He retired on his 69th birthday, 8 October 2018.

== Personal life ==
Bryant has been married since 1976 and they have three adult children; his interests include classical music, walking and the arts.

== Styles ==
- The Reverend Mark Bryant (1975–1993)
- The Reverend Canon Mark Bryant (1993–2001)
- The Venerable Mark Bryant (2001–2007)
- The Right Reverend Mark Bryant (2007–present)

Church of England titles
Preceded by Ian Russell	Archdeacon of Coventry; 2001–2007	Succeeded by Ian Watson
Preceded by John Pritchard	Bishop of Jarrow; 2007–2018	TBA
