= Hiland =

Hiland may refer to:

- Hiland (given name), including list of people with the name
- Hiland, Wyoming
- J. Cody Hiland, American attorney
- Johnny Hiland (born 1975), American musician
