= Ian Watson (priest) =

English priest (born 1950)

Ian Leslie Stewart Watson (born Carlton, Nottinghamshire 17 September 1950) was Archdeacon of Coventry from 2007 until 2012.

== Biography ==
He was educated at Westdale Lane Primary School, Mapperley, Nottingham until 1962, and then was awarded a Bursary to study at Nottingham High School (1962–69) before being commissioned in the Royal Marines in September 1969. He did formal, further studies to Interpreter level (French-English) during his service career and, as an Ordinand, theology at Wycliffe Hall, Oxford.

As an officer in the Royal Marines from 1969 to 1979 serving at CTCRM (1969–70), 41 Cdo (1970–71), BRNC Dartmouth (1971–72), 42 Cdo (1972–74) MOD London and Glasgow (1974–75), HMS Nubian (1975–77), Templar Barracks, Ashford, (1977), Army Staff College (1978) and 40 Cdo (1978–79). During his service, he served in the UK, (including service in Northern Ireland), Berlin, Scandinavia and 'at sea'. In 1977, he was the youngest officer to be awarded the Silver Jubilee Medal by HM Queen Elizabeth II. He studied for ordination at Wycliffe Hall, Oxford and was ordained in 1981 in Exeter Cathedral. After a curacy at St Andrew's, Plymouth he was Vicar of Matchborough from 1985 to 1989 and led the building of Christ Church, Matchborough, in 1987. He was Vicar then Team Rector of Woodley, Berkshire from 1989 to 1995 where he led the 'planting' of both Emmanuel and the Airfield churches; the Anglican chaplain in Amsterdam from 1995 to 2001; and Chief Executive of the Intercontinental Church Society from 2001 until his appointment as archdeacon in 2007. He was made Archdeacon Emeritus of Coventry in 2012 and Canon Emeritus of Gibraltar in 2007. During his time in Plymouth, he used to present religious programmes for Westward TV, TSW and the BBC.

He married Denise (née Macpherson) in 1972 and has two children, Hannah (1974) and Adam (1975).

A keen cricketer, he now plays and coaches wheelchair basketball at National League level (after the amputation of his left leg in 2014 as the result of a war injury incurred in Northern Ireland in 1973). He is currently the Chairman of the Society for the Relief of Poor Clergy and the Steelers Wheelers Sports Club. Additionally, he was the President of the Welton British Legion. He is also the President of the Rotary Club of Brigg. A former member of the Plymouth Lifeboat Crew, he received an award for his part in the rescue of the crew of the Saint Simeon trawler in 1985.

Church of England titles
Preceded by Mark Watts Bryant	Archdeacon of Coventry; 2007–2012	Succeeded by John Green
