= William Haighton Chappel =

William Haighton Chappel (22 May 1860, Camborne – 11 July 1922, Coventry) was an Anglican priest and educator in the late 19th and early 20th centuries.

Chappel was the eldest son of Rev. William Pester Chappel, Rector of Camborne and Canon of Truro Cathedral. He was educated at Marlborough College and Worcester College, Oxford, matriculating on 16 October 1879 and being awarded a scholarship. Graduating B.A. in classics in 1883 (M.A. 1887), Chappel graduated from Theological College in 1884, and was ordained in 1888.

He was a master at Marlborough from 1884 to 1896, and Headmaster of the King's School, Worcester from 1896 to 1919.

Chappel was Examining Chaplain to the Bishop of Worcester 1902–1905, and to the Bishop of Birmingham 1905–1909, and became a Canon of Worcester Cathedral in 1907. When Huyshe Yeatman-Biggs, Bishop of Worcester, was translated to become the first bishop of the newly revived see of Coventry in 1918, he persuaded Chappel to accompany him as the first Sub-Dean. Chappel was appointed Sub-Dean and Vicar of Coventry Cathedral in 1918, and in 1919 Rural Dean of Coventry and Vicar of Stivichall in plurality.

On 19 April 1892, Chappel married Gertrude Mary Carnsew, daughter of the late Rev. Thomas Stone Carnsew, at Exeter Cathedral.
