= Archdeacon of Coventry =

Church of England ecclesiastical office

The Archdeacon of Coventry is a senior ecclesiastical officer in the Church of England Diocese of Coventry. The post has been called the Archdeacon Pastor since 2012.

== History ==
The post was historically within the Diocese of Lichfield (formerly "Diocese of Coventry and Lichfield" until 1539, and later "Diocese of Lichfield and Coventry" until 1837) beginning in the 12th century – around the time when archdeacon first started to occur in England. From 24 January 1837, the archdeaconry was in the Diocese of Worcester, and since 6 September 1918 it has been in the Diocese of Coventry. From 2009, the archdeacon of Coventry also had statutory oversight over the Archdeaconry of Warwick, delegated from the Archdeacon Missioner, in preparation for the merging of the two archdeaconries. This arrangement may or may not still be legally in effect following the end of use of the terms "of Warwick/of Coventry" (Rodham and Green remained, legally, collated to the Archdeaconries of Warwick and of Coventry).

== List of archdeacons ==
=== High Medieval ===
- aft. 1135–1161 (res.): Richard Peche
- aft. 1161–bef. 1175: Edmund
- bef. 1176–aft. 1184: Nicholas
- bef. 1184–aft. 1189: Richard Brito (I)
- bef. 1210–aft. 1210: Richard de Leghes
- c. 1224: Robert de Bosco
- c. 1229: Richard of Gloucester
- bef. c. 1231–aft. 1245: Alexander of Hales
- bef. 1240–aft. 1242: Adam de Hoo
- bef. 1245–aft. 1245: Lawrence of St Martin
- bef. 1248–1255 (res.): William of Kilkenny
- bef. 1272–bef. 1286: John Kirkby
- c. 1284: Richard Brito (II)
- bef. c. 1293–aft. 1297: Robert Stafford
- 14 November 1299–?: Peter de Insula

=== Late Medieval ===
- ?–bef. 1302 (d.): Gregory Giudice de Alatri
- 1302–29 August 1320 (exch.): Richard (son of Anibaldus Riccardi de Urbe)
- 29 August 1320 – 27 August 1335 (d.): John Cardinal Gaetani de Urbe (Cardinal-deacon of St Theodore)
- 27 August 1335 – 11 April 1340: Vacant (due to an ongoing dispute between the king and the pope)
- 11 April 1340–bef. 1349: Humphrey de Hastanges
- 11 July 1349–aft. 1352 (deprived): Hugh de Marisco (not consistently in post)
- 3 September 1349–bef. 1351 (d.): William de Sallowe
- 12 February 1352–bef. 1354 (d.): William Cross
- 30 July 1354 – 1355 (deprived): Richard Boule
- 25 January 1355 – 20 September 1358 (exch.): William de Driffield
- 20 September 1358–bef. 1361 (d.): John de Pipe
- 14 August 1361–bef. 1369 (res.): Richard de Birmingham
- 22 November–24 December 1369 (exch.): William Lombe
- 24 December 1369–bef. 1408 (d.): Robert de Stretton
- 20 June 1408 – 18 June 1422 (res.): Robert de Oxton
- 18 June 1422 – 1433 (res.): John Heyworth
- 22 May 1433–bef. 1442 (res.): Robert Esple
- 29 June 1442–bef. 1488 (d.): Roger Wall
- 1 December 1488 – 30 January 1505 (d.): Thomas Mills
- aft. 1505–bef. 1509: George Strangways
- aft. 1509–1512 (res.): Ralph Colyngwood (afterwards Dean of Lichfield)
- 2 October 1512–bef. 1558 (d.): John Blythe

=== Early modern ===
- c. 1558–c. 1559 (deprived): Henry Comberford (disputed)
- 1560–July 1577 (d.): Thomas Lever
- August 1577 – 1584 (res.): William James
- 14 November 1584 – 1631 (d.): William Hinton
- 13 May–16 September 1631 (d.): Samuel Brooke
- 29 September 1631 – 1642 (res.): Ralph Brownrigg
- 1643–bef. 1661 (d.): Francis Walsall (disputed)
- 1661–3 March 1673 (d.): John Riland
- 10 March 1673–bef. 1684 (d.): George Downing
- 1684–20 April 1703 (d.): Lancelot Addison (also Dean of Lichfield since 1683)
- 26 July 1703–bef. 1708 (d.): Richard Davies
- 9 August 1708–bef. 1741 (d.): William Wilson
- 9 June 1741 – 2 July 1778 (d.): Thomas Smallbrook
- 22 July 1778 – 4 April 1793 (d.): Norman Fotheringham
- 16 May 1793 – 20 February 1816 (d.): William Vyse
- 14 March 1816 – 28 September 1827 (d.): Charles Buckeridge
- 19 October 1827–bef. 1851 (res.): William Spooner

The archdeaconry was in Worcester diocese from 24 January 1837.

- 31 March 1851 – 22 March 1873 (d.): John Sandford

=== Late modern ===
- 1873–1887 (ret.): Charles Holbech
- 1887–1908 (ret.): William Bree
- 1908–9 November 1922 (d.): George Arbuthnot

On 6 September 1918, the archdeaconry was moved to the new Diocese of Coventry.

- 1923–1927 (res.): Claude Blagden
- 1927–1935 (res.): Joseph Hunkin
- 1935–1940 (res.): Richard Brook
- 1941–1946 (res.): Richard Howard (also Provost of Coventry, 1933–1958)
- 1946–1965 (ret.): Leonard Stanford (afterwards archdeacon emeritus)
- 1965–1977 (ret.): Eric Buchan (afterwards archdeacon emeritus)
- 1977–1983 (res.): Peter Bridges
- 1983–1989 (res.): Alan Morgan
- 1989–2000 (ret.): Ian Russell
- 2001–2007 (res.): Mark Bryant
- 2008–2012 (ret,): Ian Watson (afterwards archdeacon emeritus)
- December 2012 – 31 August 2017: John Green (Acting, April–December 2012; called Archdeacon Pastor)
- July 2017 – 18 March 2018: Clive Hogger (Acting; assistant archdeacon since March 2018)
- 18 March 2018 – January 2023 (res.): Sue Field (called Archdeacon Pastor) was required to resign in January 2023 following disciplinary proceedings.

== Sources ==
- Le Neve, John; Hardy, Sir Thomas Duffus (1854). Archdeacons of Coventry (Chapter). Fasti ecclesiae Anglicanae. Vol. 1 (1854 ed.). Oxford: Oxford University Press. p. 568 – via Wikisource.
- Jones, B. (1964), Fasti Ecclesiae Anglicanae 1300–1541, vol. 10, pp. 14–16
- Horn, Joyce M. (2003), Fasti Ecclesiae Anglicanae 1541–1857, vol. 10, pp. 8–9
- Horn, Joyce M. (1992), Fasti Ecclesiae Anglicanae 1541–1857, vol. 7, p. 114
