= Charles Buckeridge (priest) =

English churchman, Archdeacon of Coventry

Charles Buckeridge (Lichfield, 3 June 1756 – Coventry, 29 October 1827) was an English churchman, Archdeacon of Coventry from 14 March 1816 until his death.

He was the son of Theophilus Buckeridge of Lichfield, a cleric and Master of St John's Hospital there, and was educated at St John's College, Oxford, matriculating in 1772, and graduating B.A. in 1776, M.A. 1781, B.D. 1791, and D.D. in 1807. He held livings in Pembrokeshire, Glamorganshire and the West Midlands. In 1807 he became Precentor of Lichfield Cathedral. He was twice married, firstly to Catherine Hussey, to whom a memorial by Richard Westmacott was placed in the cathedral, and secondly to Elizabeth Slaney.

Church of England titles
Preceded by William Vyse	Archdeacon of Coventry; 1816–1827	Succeeded by William Spooner
