= Richard Howard (priest) =

Anglican priest

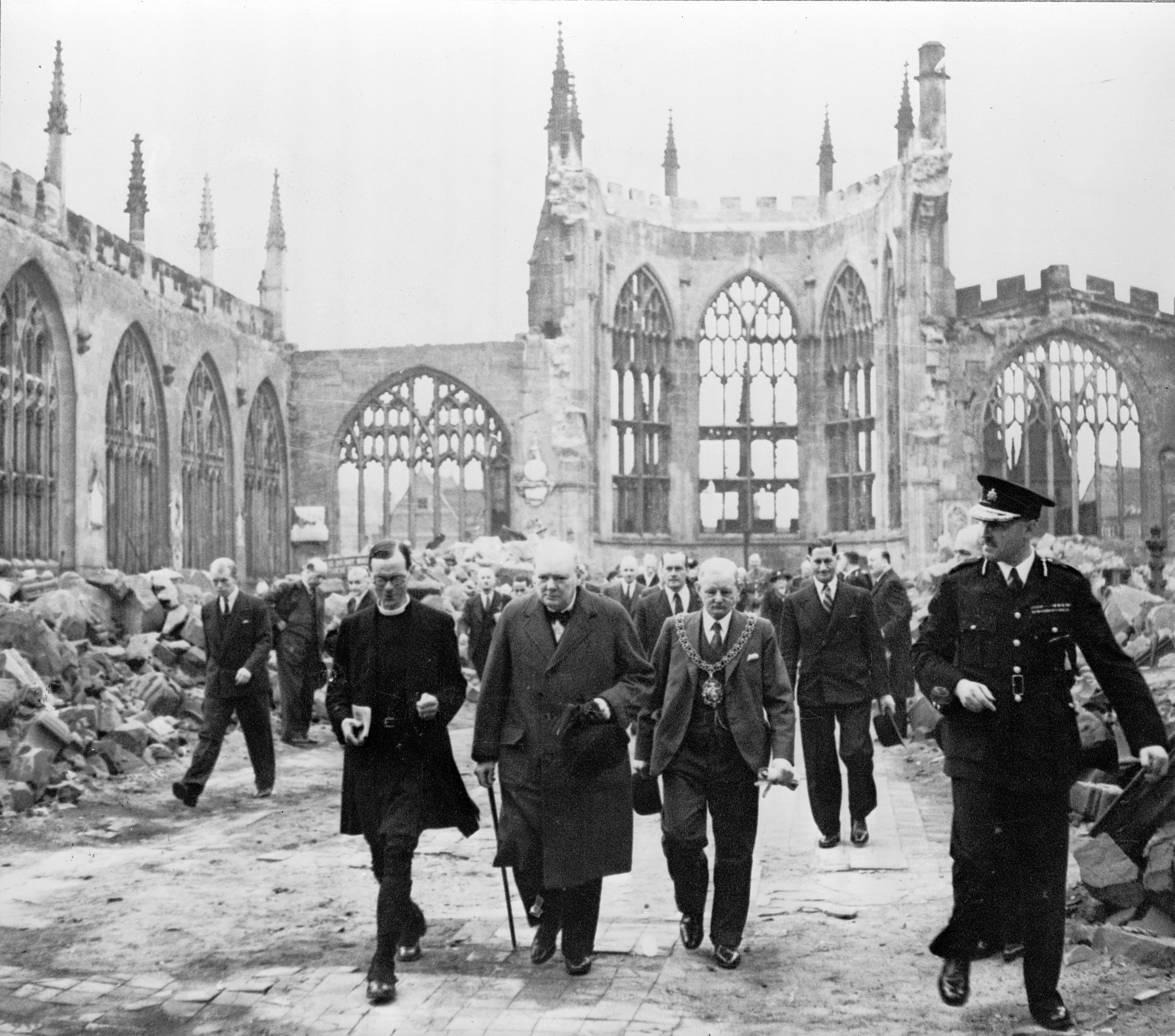
Provost Howard (left) with Winston Churchill in the ruins of Coventry Cathedral, 28 September 1941

Richard Thomas Howard (12 June 1884 – 1 November 1981) was an Anglican priest and author. During the Coventry Blitz on 14–15 November 1940 he went on the roof to try to save the cathedral but when many incendiary bombs descended he had no choice but to rescue some important artefacts and then retreat to his Anderson shelter. He is particularly remembered for advocating forgiveness and reconciliation, having 'Father Forgive' inscribed in the ruined chancel of the cathedral (rather than 'Father Forgive them', the words of Jesus on the Cross) to remind us that we all need forgiveness, not just those who have harmed us, and for his determination to rebuild a Cathedral which would speak of Christ's resurrection, as the old one mirrored his Crucifixion. With the City Council he led the way in town twinning, beginning with Kiel, which had been similarly bombed.

Howard was educated at Monkton Combe School and Jesus College, Cambridge. He was ordained in 1908 and began his ministry as chaplain of his former Cambridge college. In 1912 he went to St. John's College, Agra for the Church Missionary Society (CMS). From 1913 to 1918 he was Vice-Principal of St Paul's Divinity School, Allahabad and from then until 1929 was the Principal of St Aidan's College, Birkenhead. After four years as Vicar of Luton, in 1933 he became Provost of Coventry Cathedral, a position he held for 25 years. From 1941 to 1946 he was also Archdeacon of Coventry.

Church of England titles
Preceded by Cyril Evelyn Morton	Provost of Coventry Cathedral; 1933–1958	Succeeded by Harold Claude Noel Williams
Preceded by Richard Brook	Archdeacon of Coventry; 1941–1946	Succeeded by Leonard Stanford
