= Cyril Morton (priest) =

Cyril Evelyn Morton (1885 – 27 July 1932) was an Anglican priest.

Educated at Selwyn College, Cambridge, and Ripon College Cuddesdon, he was ordained in 1908 and began his ordained ministry with curacies in Hampstead and Roehampton. He was then an incumbent at Clifton On Dunsmore and Holy Trinity, Beauchamp Avenue, Leamington Spa. In 1929 he became Sub-Dean of the Coventry Cathedral and, in 1931, following a change in the law, the cathedral's first provost. He is buried in the churchyard at Lillington, Warwickshire.

Church of England titles
Preceded by Inaugural appointment	Provost of Coventry Cathedral; 1931–1932	Succeeded by Richard Thomas Howard
