= Cyril S. Morton =

The Reverend Cyril Shadforth Morton
- Born: 1885
- Died: 1947 (aged 61–62)
- Occupations: Clergyman; philatelist
- Known for: Philately of Jamaica
- Awards: Roll of Distinguished Philatelists (1936)

The Reverend Cyril Shadforth Morton (1885 – 13 July 1947) was a British clergyman and philatelist who signed the Roll of Distinguished Philatelists in 1936.

Morton had an award-winning collection of the stamps of Jamaica.
