= Cyril James Morton =

New Zealand filmmaker

Cyril James Morton (19 April 1903 – 25 June 1986) was a notable New Zealand film-maker. He was born in Wanganui, New Zealand on 19 April 1903.
