= William Holbech (bishop) =

British Anglican bishop (1850–1930)

The Rt. Rev. William Arthur Holbech (14 December 1850 – 7 March 1930) was an Anglican bishop in the first half of the 20th century.

Born on 14 December 1850, he was the third son of the Rev. Charles Holbech. The Holbech family owned Farnborough Hall, near Farnborough, Warwickshire. Educated at Eton and Brasenose College, Oxford, he was ordained in 1874.

Following a curacy at St Mark’s, Lakenham, Holbech emigrated to South Africa where he was a Mission Priest before promotion to be the Archdeacon of Kimberley and Rector of St Cyprian's Church (where he served through the Siege of Kimberley), then Dean of Bloemfontein. In 1905 he became Bishop of St Helena, a post he held until his death on 7 March 1930.

His nephew was William Holbech.

== Notes ==
Anglican Communion titles
Preceded by John Garraway Holmes	Bishop of St Helena; 1903 –1929	Succeeded by Charles Christopher Watts
