= Colin Semper =

British priest (1938–2022)

Colin Douglas Semper (5 February 1938 – 13 April 2022) was an English Anglican priest.

== Early life ==
He was the elder son of William Semper, a greengrocer, of 54 Eastbrook Road. He attended Mount Street School and Westgate School. He was a chorister at Lincoln Cathedral.

Semper was educated at Lincoln Grammar School and Keble College, Oxford, and was ordained in 1963.

== Career ==
He began his ordained ministry as a curate at Holy Trinity with St Mary's in Guildford. He was Recruitment and Selection Secretary for the Advisory Council for the Church's Ministry until 1969 when he became Head of Religious Programmes for BBC Radio and Deputy Head of Religious Broadcasting for the BBC, positions he held for 13 years. He then became Provost of the Cathedral Church of St Michael, Coventry. and after that Treasurer of Westminster Abbey. In retirement he continued to serve as a non-stipendiary priest at St Mary's Frensham.

=== BBC ===
He started the Sunday Radio 4 weekly programme. He produced the Speakeasy radio discussion programme hosted by Jimmy Savile. He introduced Songs of Praise from Lincoln Cathedral, which was recorded on 20 June 1972.

== Personal life ==
He lived in Guildford.

== Notes ==
Church of England titles
Preceded by Harold Claude Noel Wiliams	Provost of Coventry Cathedral; 1982–1987	Succeeded by John Fitzmaurice Petty
