= John Petty (priest) =

John Fitzmaurice Petty (9 March 1935 – 23 August 2017) was a British Anglican priest.

== Career and ministry ==
Petty was educated at Trinity Hall, Cambridge and Cuddesdon Theological College in Oxford and ordained in 1967 after an earlier military career with the Royal Engineers lasting 11 years. He was a curate at St Cuthbert's Sheffield and then St Helier, Morden. From 1975 to 1987 he was Vicar of St John the Evangelist, Hurst Cross, Ashton-under-Lyne when he became Provost of the Cathedral Church of St Michael, Coventry and was later appointed Dean of Coventry, a position he held until his retirement in 2000. Petty later became chaplain at Mount House Residential Home in Shrewsbury, a trustee of the Simeon Trust, and assisted at St Chad's Church, Shrewsbury.

Petty married Susan Shakerley in 1962 and they had four children.

He died on 23 August 2017 at the age of 82.

Church of England titles
Preceded by Colin Douglas Semper	Provost of Coventry Cathedral; 1988–2000	Succeeded by John Dudley Irvine
