= Hiland (given name) =

Hiland is a given name. Notable people with the given name include:

- Hiland Hall (1795–1885), American lawyer and politician
- Hiland R. Hulburd (1829–1880), American government official
- Hiland J. Spaulding (1841–1927), American politician and businessman
- Hiland Orlando Stickney (1867–1911), American football player and coach

== See also ==
- Hiland (disambiguation)
