= Peter Bridges (priest) =

Peter Sydney Godfrey Bridges, ARIBA (30 January 1925 – 24 January 2015) was an Anglican priest who served in three senior posts during the last third of the twentieth century.

Bridges was educated at Raynes Park County Grammar School and initially trained as an architect. He was ordained in 1958 and began his career as a Curate in Hemel Hempstead. After this he was Resident Fellow at Birmingham University’s Institute for the Study of Worship and Religious Architecture from 1964 to 1967 and a Lecturer there from then until 1972 when he became the Archdeacon of Southend. In 1977 he became Archdeacon of Coventry; and in 1983 Archdeacon of Warwick, a post he held until his retirement. He died in January 2015, at age 89.

Church of England titles
Preceded by Neville Welch	Archdeacon of Southend; 1972–1977	Succeeded by John Moses
Preceded by Eric Ancrum Buchan	Archdeacon of Coventry; 1977–1983	Succeeded by Alan Wyndham Morgan
Preceded by Edward Taylor	Archdeacon of Warwick; 1983–1990	Succeeded by Michael Paget Wilkes
