= St Barbe Holland =

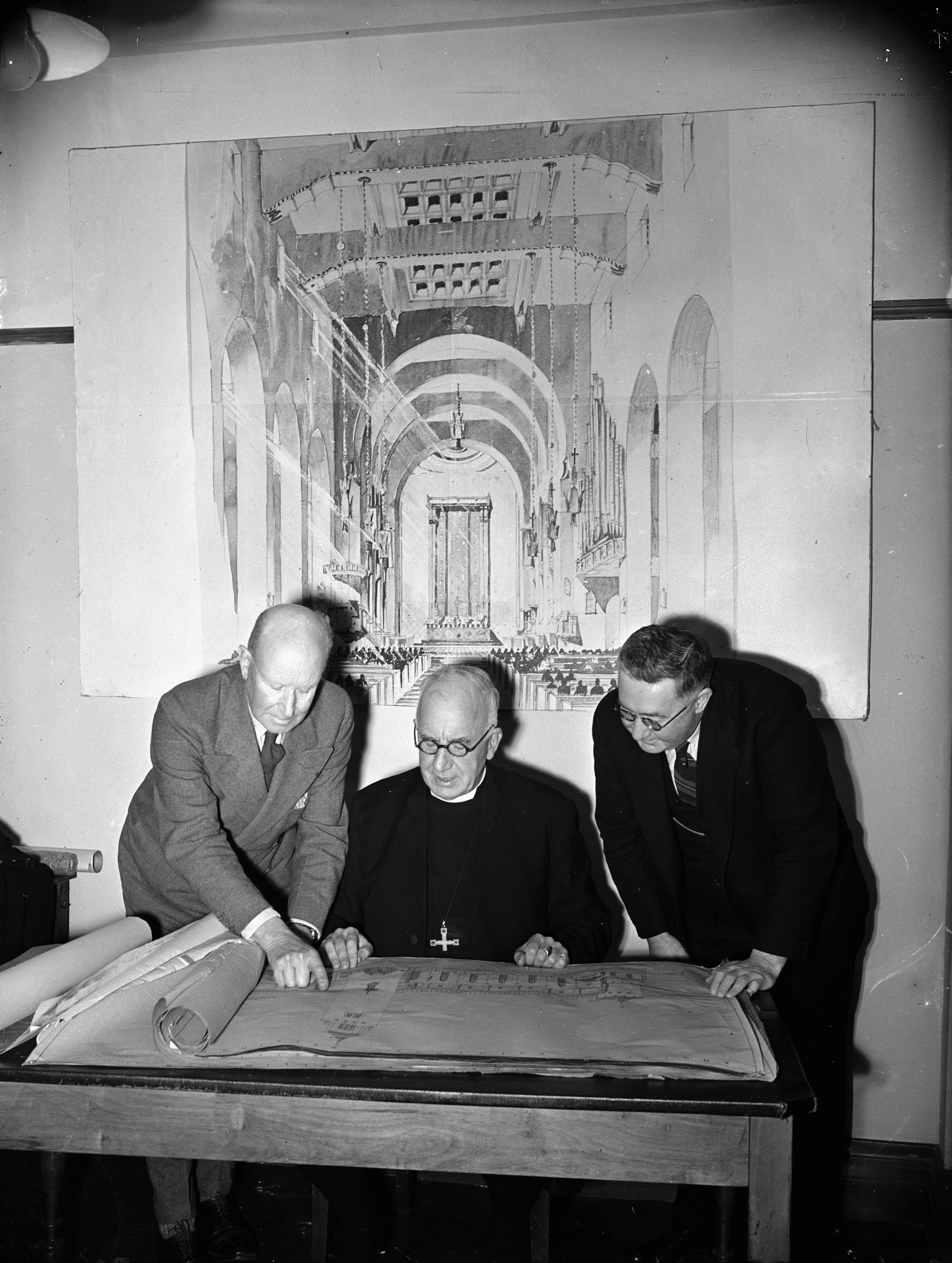
Holland in 1945 (center)

Herbert St Barbe Holland (15 October 1882 – 9 June 1966) was an Anglican bishop in the 20th century.

Holland was born in 1882, the youngest of three sons of Canon William Lyall Holland of Cornhill-on-Tweed. He was educated at Durham School and University College, Oxford and ordained in 1908.

Following a curacy at Jesmond Parish Church he became Vicar of St Luke's, Newcastle upon Tyne. From 1917 until 1924 he was Secretary of the Church Missionary Society and then Sub-Dean of Coventry. Finally (before his ordination to the episcopate) he was rector of Hampton Lucy, Warwickshire and, from 1929, the Archdeacon of Warwick. In 1936 he became Bishop of Wellington, NZ. A decade later he returned to England as Dean of Norwich. A friend of Clement Attlee, he died in 1966, aged 83 and later had a street in Norwich named in his honour.

His son was the Rt Revd John Holland, Bishop of Polynesia.

== Notes ==
- The New Bishop of Wellington - Archdeacon Holland

Church of England titles
| Preceded by Thomas Henry Sprott | Bishop of Wellington; 1936–1946 | Succeeded by Reginald Herbert Owen |
| Preceded by Daniel Herbert Somerset Cranage | Dean of Norwich; 1946–1952 | Succeeded by Norman Hook |
