= Farnborough, Warwickshire =

Village in Warwickshire, England

Coordinates: 52.1439°N 1.3687°W

Farnborough
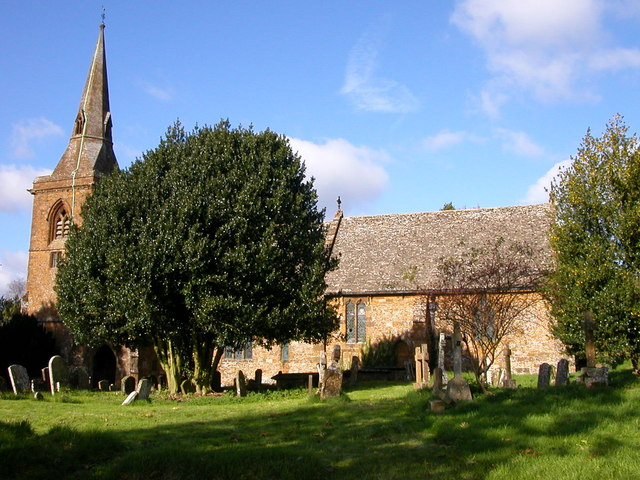
- St Botolph's Church

- Location within Warwickshire
- Population: 265 (2011)
- OS grid reference: SP433497
- Civil parish: Farnborough
- District: Stratford-on-Avon
- Shire county: Warwickshire
- Region: West Midlands
- Country: England
- Sovereign state: United Kingdom
- Post town: Banbury
- Postcode district: OX17
- Dialling code: 01295
- Police: Warwickshire
- Fire: Warwickshire
- Ambulance: West Midlands
- UK Parliament: Kenilworth and Southam

Farnborough is a village and civil parish in the Stratford-on-Avon district of Warwickshire, England. It is located on the border with Oxfordshire, around 6 miles (10 km) north of Banbury. The population taken at the 2011 census was 265. The village has a church, St Botolphs, a village hall and an eating house, The Kitchen. On the southern edge of the village is Farnborough Hall, a Grade I Listed building built by the Holbech family in the early 17th century and endowed to the National Trust in the 1960s.
