= Thomas Holbech =

English academic (1606–1680)

Thomas Holbech, D.D. (1606–1680) was an academic in the 17th century.

Dillingham was born in Fillongley and entered Emmanuel College, Cambridge in 1622, graduating B.A in 1626 and M.A. in 1629. He was Fellow of Emmanuel from 1629 to 1675; and Vicar of Epping from 1641 to 163; and again from 1660 until his death. He was also Rector of St Augustine Watling Street from 1662. He was Master of Emmanuel from 1676 until his death in 1680. He was Vice-Chancellor of the University of Cambridge from 1677 to 1678.
