= Jesse Proctor =

Jesse Heighton Proctor (26 May 1908 – 21 May 2001) was the Archdeacon of Warwick in the Diocese of Coventry, England.

He was born in Melton Mowbray, Leicestershire and educated at the King Edward VII School, Melton Mowbray and the College of St Mark and St John, Chelsea, where he trained to be a school teacher. He also took a London University MA degree in history.

From 1929 to 1932 he taught at Winterbourne School, Croydon, after which he accepted a post as senior history master at his old school in Melton Mowbray. After three years he left to prepare for the priesthood at St Andrew's College in Whittlesford, near Cambridge and in 1935 was appointed curate of Whittlesford, serving until 1938. After a short curacy at St Philip's Church, Leicester, he became vicar of South Wigston, near Leicester, where he remained throughout World War II, also acting as chaplain of the nearby Glen Parva Barracks. After the war he moved in 1946 to Coventry Cathedral where he spent 12 years as an Honorary Canon, and 5 years as a Canon Theologian. During this time he was director of post-ordination training for 17 years. From 1958 to 1974 he filled the post of Archdeacon of Coventry until his retirement.

He had married Helena Wood, with whom he had a son and two daughters.
