= John Riland =

English Anglican priest

John Riland was an English Anglican priest in the 17th century.

Riland was born in Gloucestershire and educated at Magdalen College, Oxford. He held livings in Exhall and Birmingham. He was Archdeacon of Coventry from 1661 until his death on 3 March 1673.
