= Claude Blagden =

Anglican bishop (1874–1952)

The Right Reverend Claude Blagden
- Bishop of Peterborough
- Blagden in 1939
- Diocese: Diocese of Peterborough
- In office: 1927–1949
- Predecessor: Cyril Bardsley
- Successor: Spencer Leeson
- Other posts: Canon of Coventry (1918–1920); Archdeacon of Warwick (1920–1923); Archdeacon of Coventry (1923–1927)

Orders
- Ordination: 1898 (deacon); 1899 (priest) by William Stubbs, Bishop of Oxford
- Consecration: 25 March 1927 by Theodore Woods, Bishop of Winchester

Personal details
- Born: 18 April 1874 Milcombe, Oxfordshire, United Kingdom
- Died: 7 September 1952 (aged 78) Rugby, Warwickshire, UK
- Denomination: Anglicanism
- Parents: Henry & Emma
- Spouse: Edith (died); Evelyn (widowed)
- Children: one son, three daughters
- Education: Bradfield College; Corpus Christi, Oxford, Christ Church, Oxford

Claude Martin Blagden (18 April 1874 – 7 September 1952) was an eminent Anglican bishop in the first half of the 20th century.

== Family and early life ==
He was born on 18 April 1874, the fifth son and youngest child of the eight children of Henry Charles Blagden (1831–1914) and Emma Ladd Pilcher (1835–1936). His father was the Vicar of Milcombe, and Claude was born in the vicarage. When his parents moved into the home, it was newly built and today it is privately owned and known as "Milcombe House". Near the vicarage is the Church of St Laurence which was built of local Horton stone in the 13th century and was restored several times, most significantly just before the Blagdens moved in.

== Education and ordination ==
Blagden was educated at Bradfield in his youth, a boarding school for young men, and from there he entered Corpus Christi, Oxford and on graduation moved to Christ Church, Oxford. He received the BA, Literae Humaniores in 1896; MA (Oxon) in 1899, the same year he was ordained a priest. He was ordained as deacon at Michaelmas (September) 1898 and as priest at Michaelmas 1899, both times by William Stubbs, Bishop of Oxford, at Christ Church. He was awarded the diploma Doctor of Divinity in 1927, and he was a tutor at Corpus Christi College, Oxford, from 1896 to 1912.

== Marriages and priestly career ==
He married, first, Edith Daisy Hassall (1878–1918), daughter of Emily and Henry Addison Hassall, on 28 December 1905, at Bebington. Edith had been a governess at the Deanery at Christ Church College. Three children were born of their marriage, a son Cyprian, 1906 and two daughters Marjorie, 1910 and Felicity, 1915. During that period Blagden left his posts at Oxford and became Rector of Rugby, Warwickshire from 1912 to 1927, later Canon of Coventry from 1918 to 1920, and then Archdeacon of Warwick from 1920 to 1923. Edith died on 16 October 1918 at Rugby. The Archdeacon married, second, Evelyn Hester Dewar (1885–1956), daughter of William Dewar and Anne Eveline Sadler of Rugby, on 23 April 1922 at Rugby. The couple was married thirty years.

== Episcopal career and retirement ==
Immediately prior to becoming a bishop, Blagden was both rector at Rugby and Archdeacon of Coventry. He was nominated in January 1927 to become Bishop of Peterborough: his canonical election by the Dean and Chapter of Peterborough Cathedral was conducted on 28 February and his election was confirmed at St Mary-le-Bow on 23 March — it was at this point that he legally became Bishop of Peterborough. Blagden was consecrated as a bishop at Westminster Abbey, on 25 March 1927, by Theodore Woods, Bishop of Winchester, assisted by Guy Warman, Bishop of Chelmsford; Michael Furse, Bishop of St Albans; Thomas Strong, Bishop of Oxford; Charles Lisle Carr, Bishop of Coventry; Walter Whittingham, Bishop of St Edmundsbury and Ipswich; Cyril Bardsley, Bishop of Leicester (Blagden's predecessor at Peterborough); Edward Bidwell, retired Bishop of Ontario; and Nelson Fogarty, Bishop of Damaraland. He held that See for 22 years before his resignation on 29 September 1949, after which he retired to Westmorland and died on 7 September 1952 at Rugby. He was survived by his wife Evelyn, who died on 10 September 1956 at Preston, Lancashire.

Church of England titles
Preceded by Cyril Bardsley	Bishop of Peterborough; 1927–1949	Succeeded by Spencer Leeson
