= William Holbech (MP for Banbury) =

British politician; (1748–1812)

William Holbech (1748 – 6 July 1812) was an English politician from Warwickshire. He sat in the House of Commons of Great Britain for two years in the 1790s.

He was the oldest son of Hugh Holbech of Whitley Hall and his wife Catherine, daughter of Col. Robert Cornewall. He was educated at Rugby School, Eton College, and Trinity College, Oxford. In 1772, he married Anne, the daughter of William Woodhouse, from Lichfield; they had five sons and two daughters.

In 1771, aged 23, he inherited (from his uncle William Holbech) his grandfather's estates at Farnborough Hall, Warwickshire, Mollington, Oxfordshire and Radston, Northamptonshire.

He was elected at a by-election in 1794 as the member of parliament (MP) for Lord Guilford's family borough of Banbury. However, at the next election in 1796, Lord Guilford imposed his own candidate.

He was an ancestor of the Rev. Charles Holbech.

Parliament of Great Britain
Preceded by Frederick North	Member of Parliament for Banbury; 1794–1796	Succeeded by Dudley Long North
