= Farnborough Hall =

Country house in Warwickshire, England

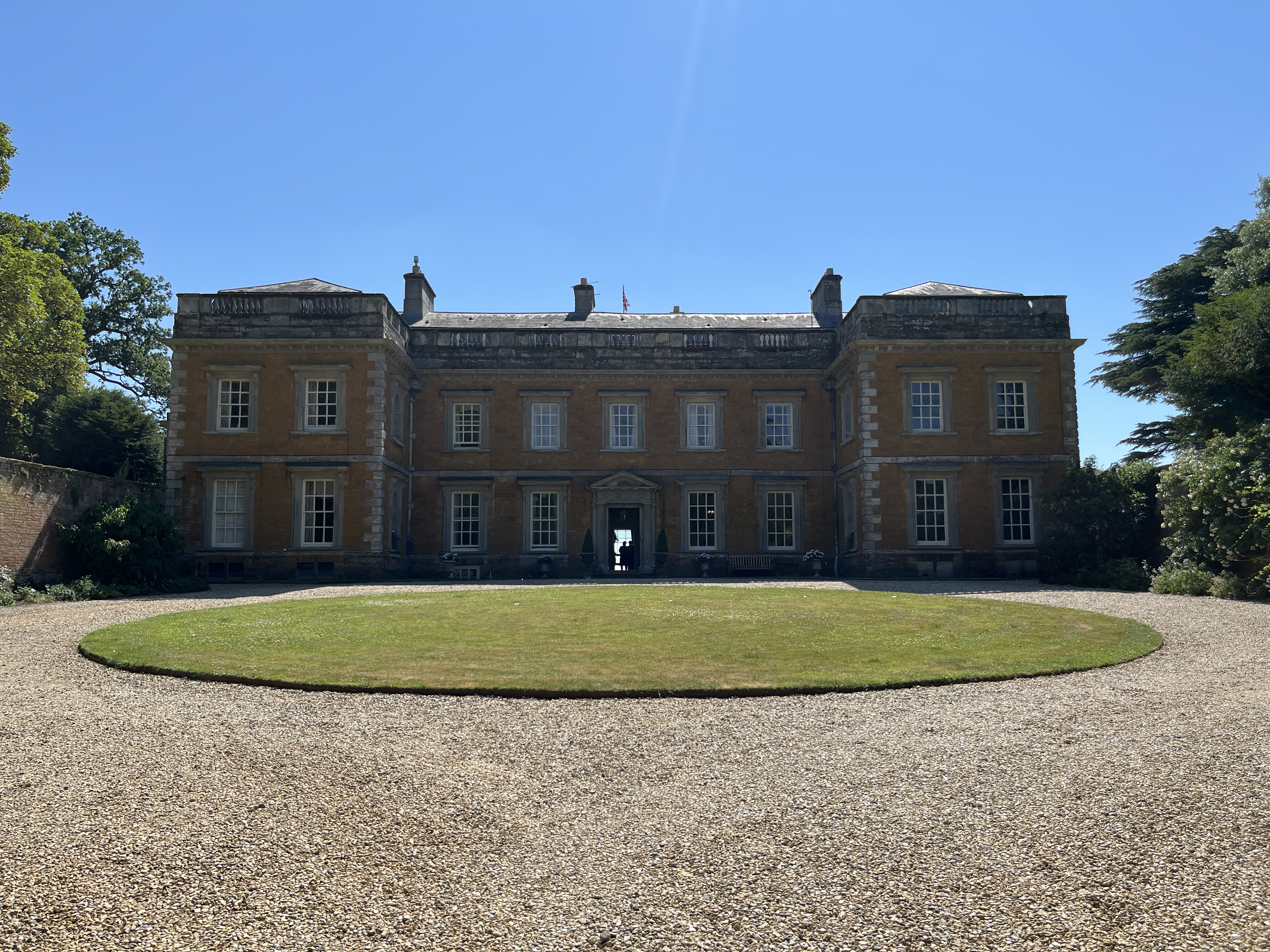
- North side and main entrance of the hall
- Interactive map of Farnborough Hall
- 52.14130°N 1.37200°W
- Location: Farnborough, Warwickshire, England
- OS grid reference: SP4349

Site notes
- Owner: National Trust

Listed Building – Grade I
- Official name: Farnborough Hall
- Designated: 7 January 1952
- Reference no.: 1374964

Listed Building – Grade II*
- Official name: The Oval Pavilion
- Designated: 7 January 1952
- Reference no.: 1024463

Listed Building – Grade II*
- Official name: The Ionic Temple
- Designated: 30 May 1967
- Reference no.: 1299780

Listed Building – Grade II*
- Official name: The Game Larder
- Designated: 21 April 1986
- Reference no.: 1374967

Listed Building – Grade II
- Official name: Farnborough Hall: The Obelisk
- Designated: 30 May 1967
- Reference no.: 1355432

Listed Building – Grade II
- Official name: Farnborough Hall Stable Block and attached gatepiers
- Designated: 21 April 1986
- Reference no.: 1185177

National Register of Historic Parks and Gardens
- Official name: Farnborough Hall
- Type: Grade I
- Designated: 1 February 1986
- Reference no.: 1000110

Farnborough Hall is a country house in Warwickshire, England near to the town of Banbury. It has been owned by the National Trust since 1960 when Geoffrey Holbech endowed the house and estate, and is still administered by the Holbech family; the house is a Grade I listed building.

== History ==
Ambrose Holbech acquired the Farnborough estate in 1684 from the Ralegh family, who had owned it since the thirteenth century. Archaeological research has demonstrated that the Raleghs had re-sited the hall from its former, moated location earlier in the seventeenth century. The new house was built of Hornton stone. Although it was Ambrose Holbech who had purchased the property, it was his son William who began to renovate it after his marriage to Elizabeth Arlington in 1692.

William Holbech inherited the estate, and, after his return from a Grand Tour in the 1730s, began a scheme of work c. 1740 to make it a suitable setting for the display of the art and antiquities he returned with. His collection included ceramics and sculpture, as well as paintings by Canaletto and Giovanni Paolo Panini. The interiors of the house include extremely fine plasterwork undertaken by stuccatore William Perritt. The hall was remodelled in the Palladian style c. 1745–1750, for William Holbech, perhaps by the designer Sanderson Miller. Much of what is known about this period comes from a work written by Miller's great-grandson Reverend George Miller, who published a history of Farnborough in his Rambles Round the Edge Hills, published in 1900.

In 1771, another William Holbech inherited the estate. Since 2015 the Trust has been working to restore the parkland to the design shown on a surviving estate plan that dates to 1772. From 1815 to 1816, another Holbech commissioned Henry Hakewill to build a new coach-house and remodel the rose garden, and path down to the cascade – referred to today as 'Granny's Walk'.

During the First World War, the hall was adapted to become a hospital, and was known as Farnborough Auxiliary Hospital. After the war the originals of the Canaletto and Pannini paintings were sold by Ronald Holbech, although the final publication of the Will of Lieutenant W. H. Holbech, Ronald's older brother, states that "his household effects, etc. at Farnborough Hall, are to devolve as heirlooms with the property as settled on 2nd February 1910. The residue of his property is left equally to his brother, Ronald Acland Holbech, and his sisters Olive Ruth Holbech and Marjory Walrond Holbech." For example, one of the paintings by Canaletto that was sold was entitled Venice, the Grand Canal looking East with Santa Maria della Salute.

During the Second World War the house was used as an auxiliary military hospital.

The estate was endowed to the National Trust in 1960 by Geoffrey Holbech, after Geoffrey inherited the house and estate from his late older brother at the end of the Second World War.

As of 2022, Geoffrey Holbech's daughter (Caroline Beddall) and family continued to live in the hall, and administer seasonal visitor access on behalf of the Trust.

== Gardens and parkland ==
The parkland is a rare surviving example of the ferme ornée (ornamental farm) style of landscaping. It combined agricultural practicality with fashionable design: farm buildings were ornamental, yet suited for their purpose, and could be features within the landscape. Sanderson Miller, a contemporary of Capability Brown, remodelled the parkland at the request of William Holbech II.

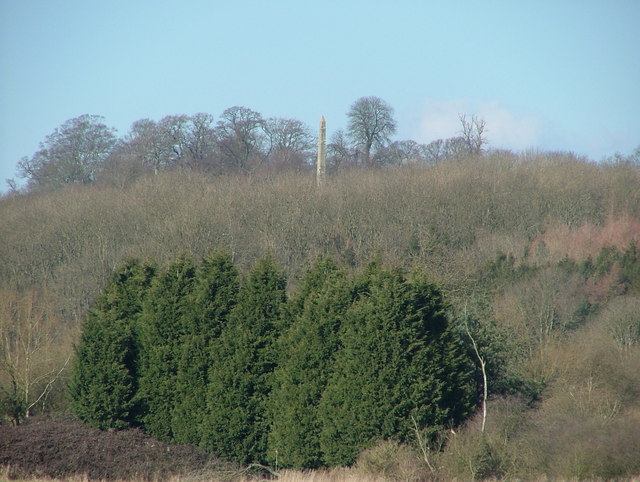
Obelisk at Farnborough Hall

One of the most significant introductions to the garden design was the Terrace Walk, which was constructed on an existing slope and has 26 viewing points along it. It is 1200m long. Closest to the Hall is the Game Larder overlooking St Botolph's Church, Farnborough; this is followed by the Ionic Temple and Oval Pavilion. At the end of the Terrace Walk, is the 18m high Obelisk, which overlooks the Warmington Valley. The Obelisk was first recorded by a visitor in 1746. It was rebuilt in 1828 after it collapsed in 1823 and has the names of many visitors etched into the base – most notably one of an Italian prisoner of war that was inscribed during the Second World War. The Terrace scheme also included a cascade; repairs to it were undertaken in 2016. The park also included a Georgian amphitheatre.

=== Water ===
Miller also introduced a more naturalistic look to the parkland, which included the construction of sinuous pond, known as the Serpentine, designed to look like a river. Repairs to which were undertaken in 2015. Miller also engineered part of the River Sor, elevating it 5 metres higher, to form an ornamental pool which could be viewed from the house. Known as the Oval Pond, this feature had dried out; as of 2016, its outline could still be seen in earthworks. Above it lay Sourland Pond, which was constructed on land that was already waterlogged.

=== Planting ===
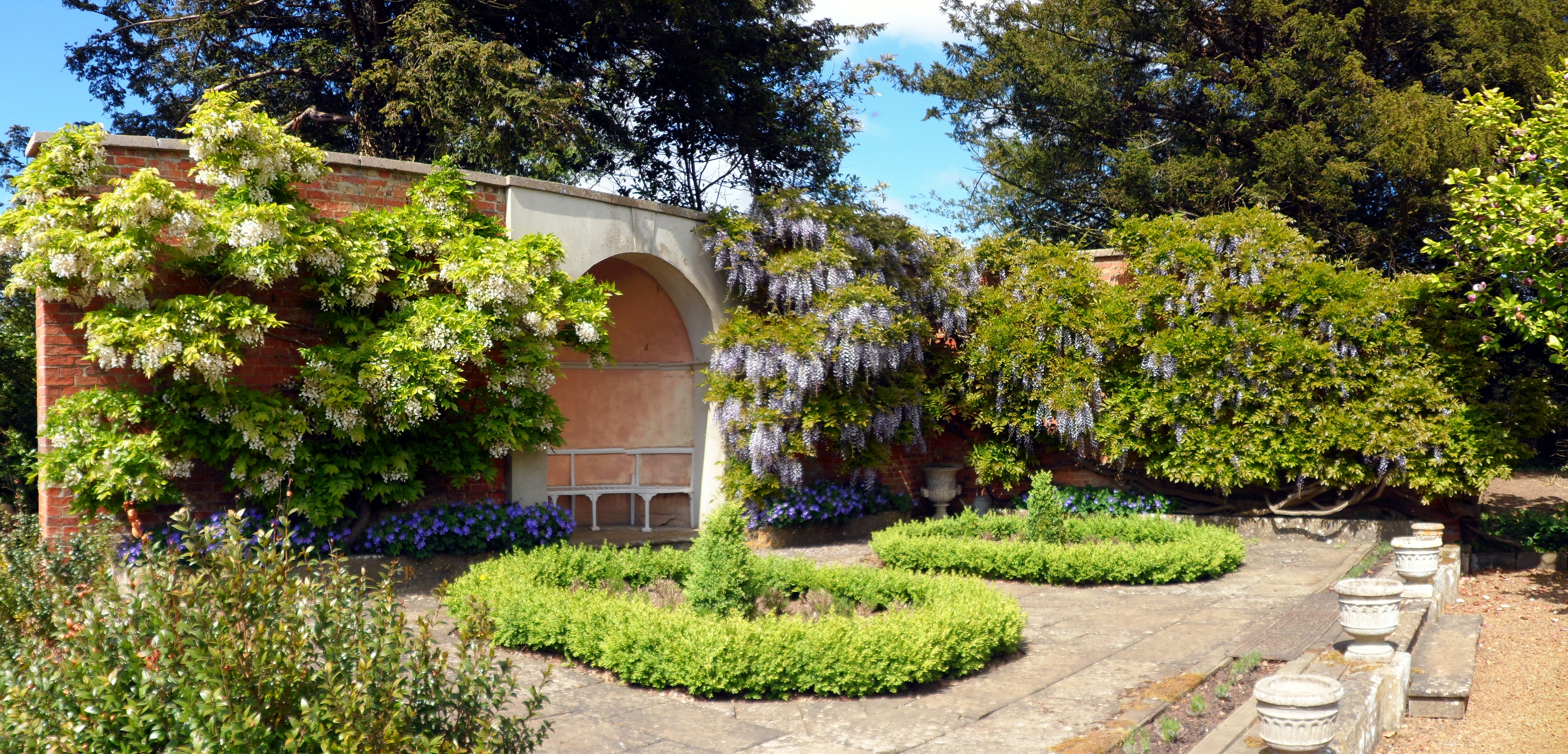
Farnborough Hall Rose Garden

Miller used trees, such as Scots pines, to draw attention to features in the landscape, both close to the house and further away. In addition, between 1786 and 1790, several cedar of Lebanon trees were given to Mrs William Holbech by her great-grandson Lord Warwick, for the estate.

The gardens also include the remains of an orangery and a rose garden.

== Legacy ==
The estate and gardens at Farnborough are notable not just for the preservation of the ferme ornée (ornamental farm) style of landscaping. They also represent an important stage in the development of the English landscape garden movement in the first half of the eighteenth century.

It is a Grade I listed building.

== In popular culture ==
The first mention of the landscape garden in literature is found in a poem called Edgehill by Richard Jago.

Farnborough Hall featured in the 1966 film Grand Prix.

== Gallery ==
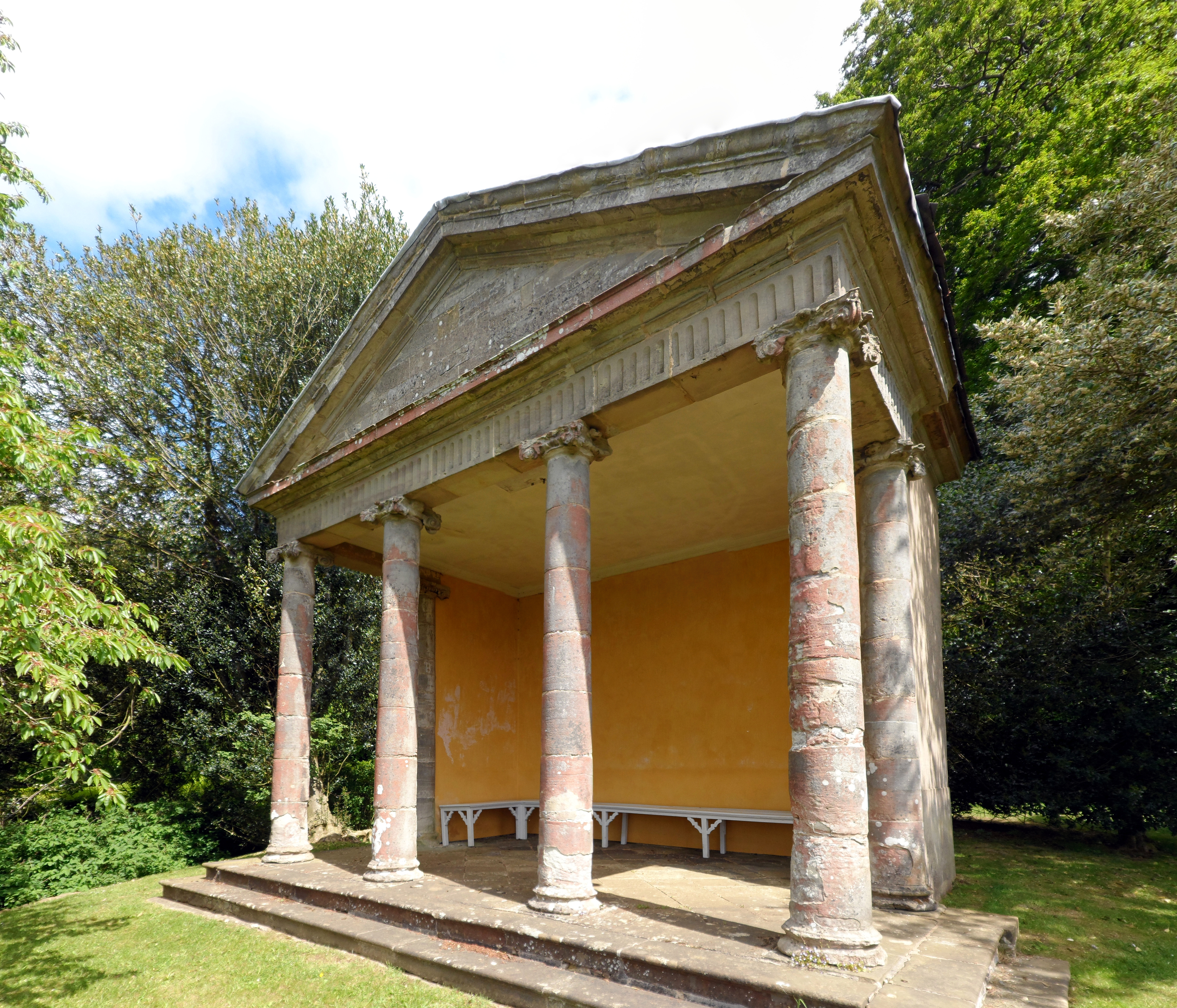
Ionic Temple

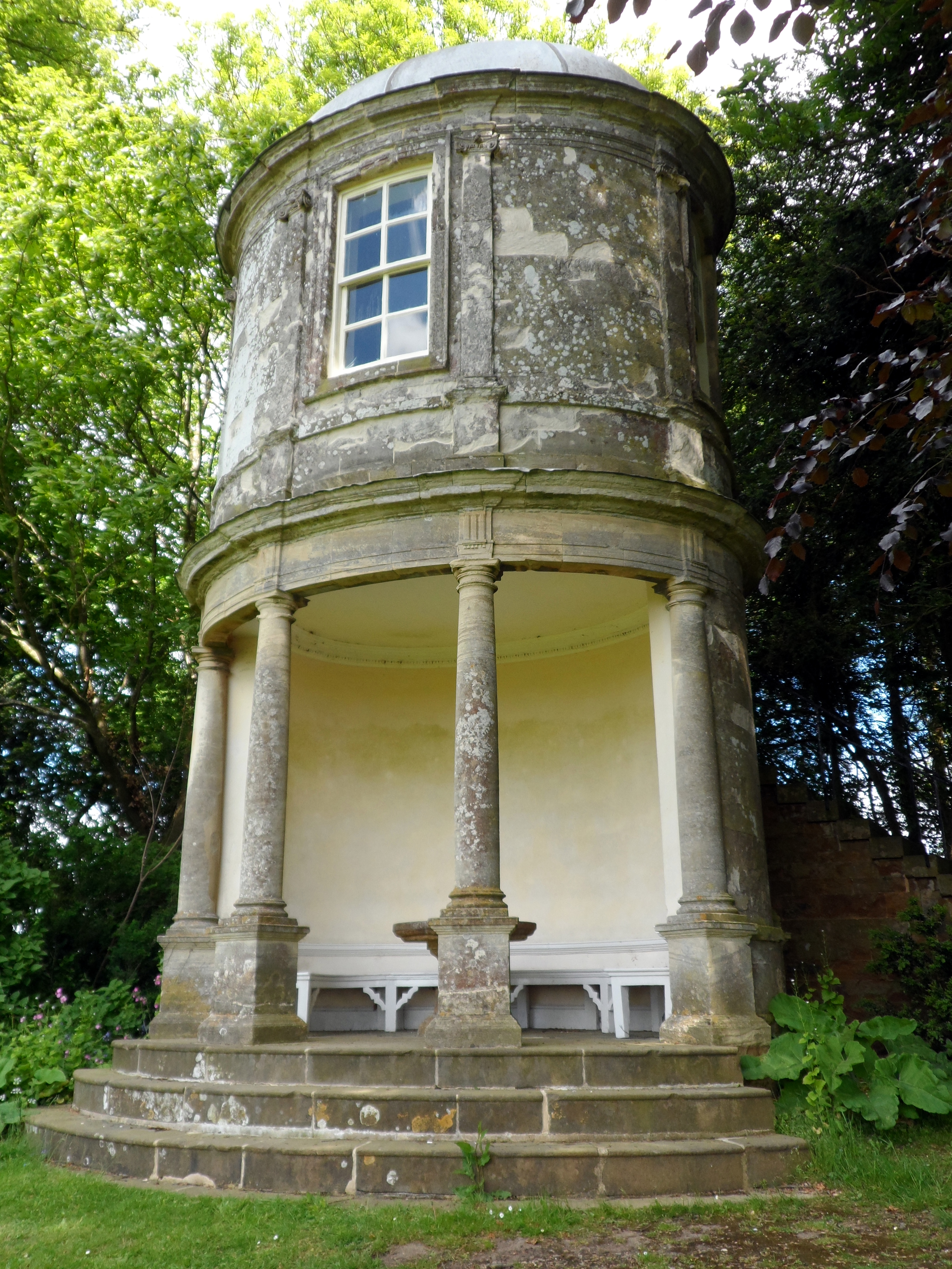
Oval Pavilion

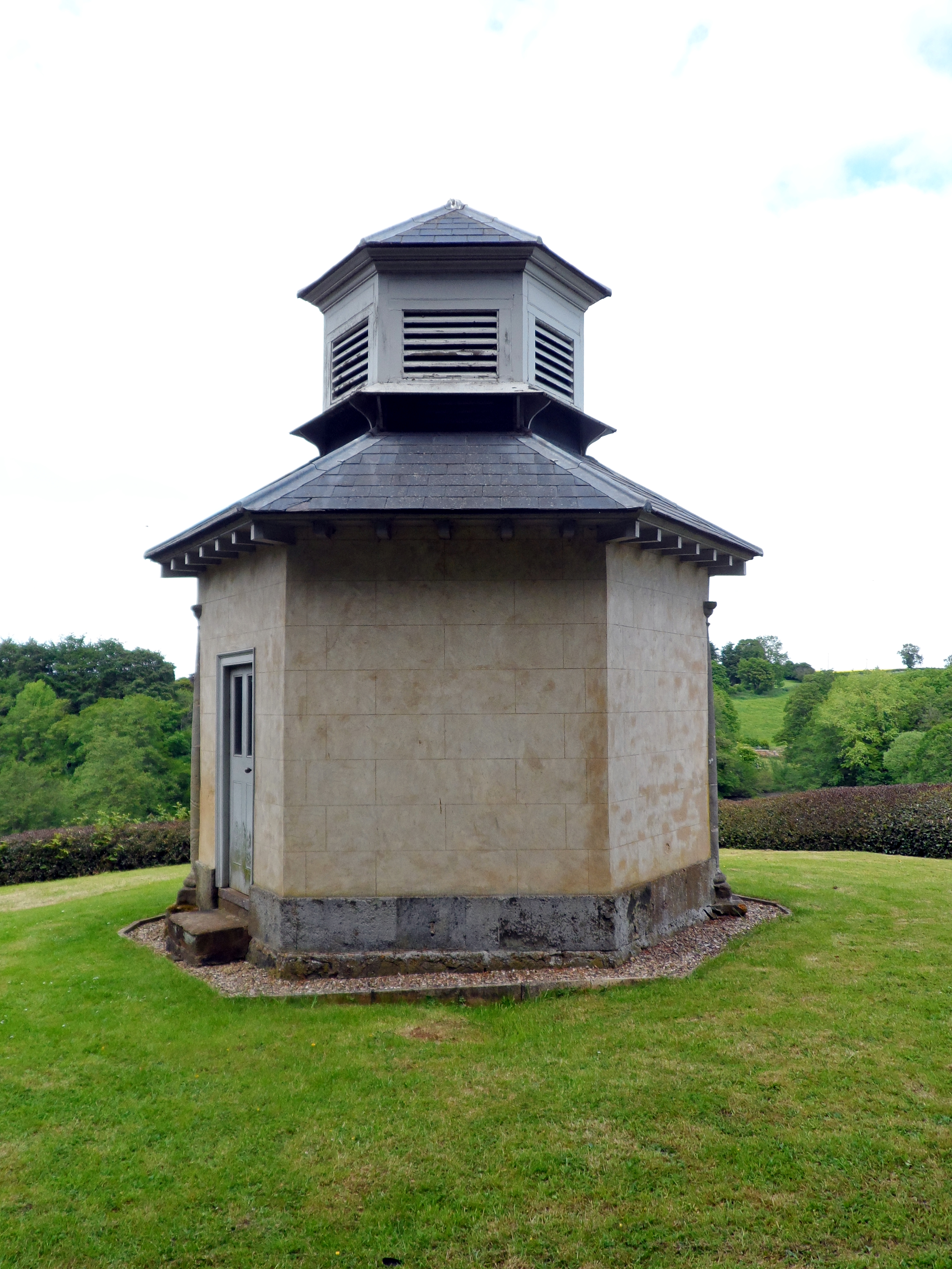
Game Larder

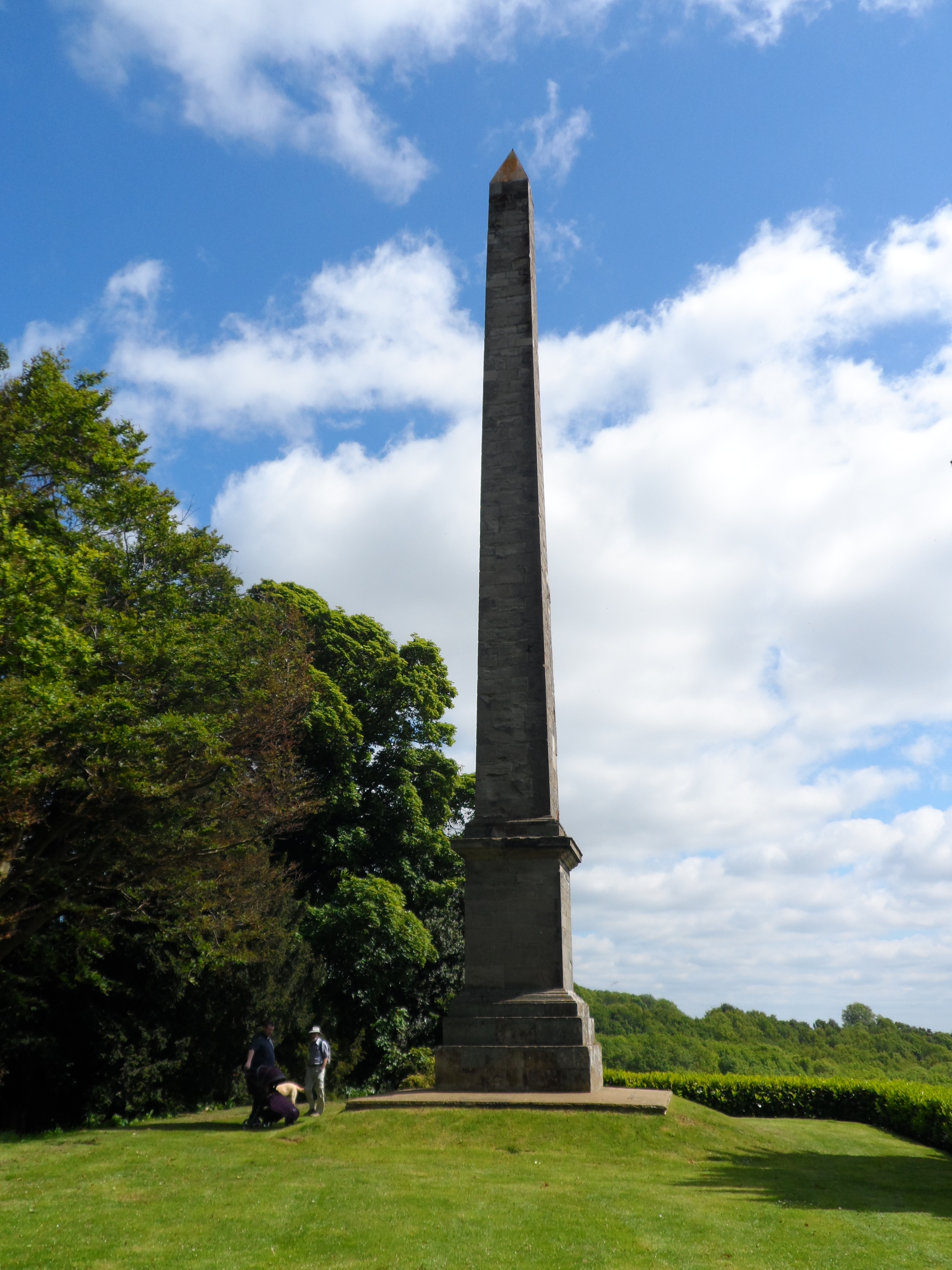
Obelisk
