= Clive Hogger =

Archdeacon of Cornwall (born 1970)

Clive Hogger (born 1970) is the Archdeacon of Cornwall in the Diocese of Truro. Prior to that he was one of several Associate Archdeacons in the Diocese of Sheffield. He has also served as an Assistant Archdeacon in the Diocese of Coventry and as the Acting Archdeacon Pastor of the Diocese of Coventry (2017 – March 2018) between the retirement of John Green and the collation of Sue Field.

Hogger was educated at Watford Grammar School for Boys and Sheffield University and trained for ministry at Ridley Hall, Cambridge. He was ordained in the Church of England: made deacon at Petertide (29 June) 2008 and ordained priest the Petertide following (4 July 2009) – both times by John Stroyan, Bishop of Warwick, in Coventry Cathedral. After a curacy in Fletchamstead he became Team Vicar in the "Coventry East" team (2011–2016) and Area Dean for Coventry East Deanery (2014–2018). In 2016, he became Rector of the new parish of Coventry All Saints, a post he held concurrent with his appointments as Acting Archdeacon Pastor in 2017 and as Assistant Archdeacon.
