= Sydenham, Leamington Spa =

Suburb in Leamington Spa, Warwickshire, England

Coordinates: 52.28106°N 1.51365°W

Sydenham
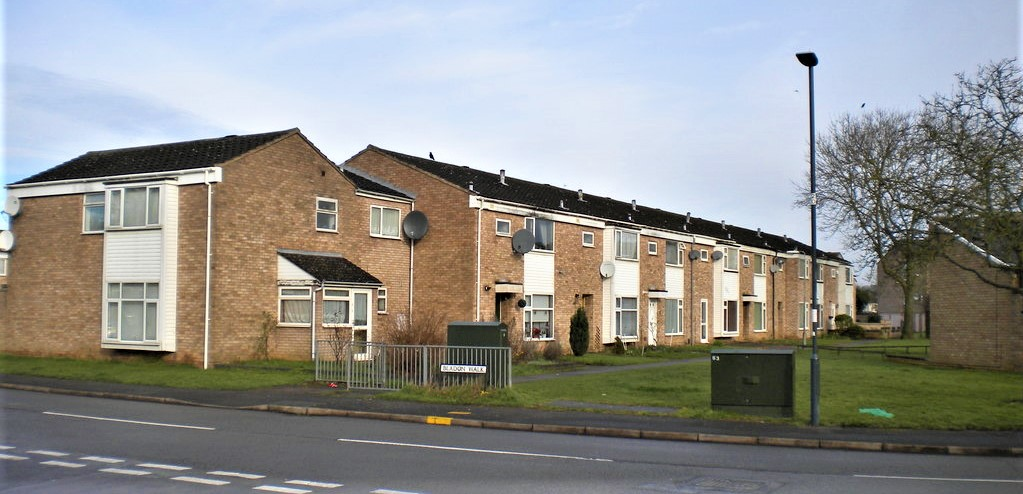
- A typical Sydenham street

- Location within Warwickshire
- Civil parish: Royal Leamington Spa
- District: Warwick
- Shire county: Warwickshire
- Region: West Midlands
- Country: England
- Sovereign state: United Kingdom
- Police: Warwickshire
- Fire: Warwickshire
- Ambulance: West Midlands

Sydenham is an eastern suburb of the town of Leamington Spa, in the Warwick district, in the county of Warwickshire, England.

Prior to the 1960s the area was rural, with only agricultural buildings and a small water mill existing. Sydenham as a name is a corruption of side meaning "wide or open spaces" and ham meaning "a piece of land enclosed by rivers or water courses". The three water courses in question are the small Radbrook and the much larger River Leam and the Grand Union Canal. Two railway lines crossed the area, the Rugby–Leamington line in 1851 and the Chiltern Main Line in 1852. Between 1884 and 1914 there was a Polo ground in the area. Following the closure of the grounds the area was used in the 1930s for pleasure flights given by Alan Cobham. The farm from which the suburb most directly takes its name, Sydenham Farm, first appeared on maps in 1887. On the farm land during World War Two an anti aircraft gun was positioned. In June 1903 Buffalo Bill brought his Wild West Show to the area, with the animals and staging arriving at Leamington Spa railway station before being brought on carts to the site.

== Rapid growth in the mid 20th century ==
Plans to develop the area industrially were mooted as early as 1947 but it was only in 1956 that Leamington Borough Council decided on expanding into the area residentially. In 1959 all the animals and equipment from Sydenham Farm were sold at auction and the site purchased by the Borough Council and development company AC Lloyd. Coventry born architect Frederick Gibberd was employed in 1962 to oversee the first stage of development which would be 95 acres and cost £2.5 million. He employed the so called Radburn system of planning which is typified by the back gardens of homes facing the street and the fronts of homes facing one another, over common yards. It is an offshoot of American designs from the English 'garden city' movement and culminated in the design of the partly-built 1929 Radburn estate. By 1967 almost 2,500 people were housed in this development, situated north of the already closed and lifted Leamington Rugby railway line.

Land south of the former line was quickly developed afterwards, the Radburn system having been abandoned. The estate finally covered 250 acres and has 1,500 dwelling, as well as a small industrial estate to its east, adjacent to Leamington Spa. The displaced allotment gardens where moved to north of the Radford Road, where they are still located. Further development has taken place south of the original farm land, firstly in the 1990s and secondly in the 2010s.

== Facilities ==
There were three schools in the estate, Campion School (secondary), built in 1973 and two junior schools, "St Anthony's" (1968) and "Sydenham" (1976). They are still open, although Sydenham School closed in 1997 only to be re-opened in 2012 on a site close by. There are two public houses on the estate, The Fusilier which opened in 1965 in the north next to the canal and The Shire Grill, formally The Grist Mill, (1985) in the south. The original row of shops built during the first development phrase are still used now, with 3 takeaways, Post Office, a small Morrisons Daily and a pharmacy. In 1981 the first Asda store in Warwickshire opened at the south of the estate, becoming Leamington's first "out of town" supermarket. Approximately 15,000 people tried to use the store on its opening day, one in three of the population of Leamington. A medical clinic called The Croft Medical Centre is located by Asda.

The SYDNI (Sydenham Neighbourhood Initiative) Centre is the suburbs community centre. Built at a cost of £1 million in 2002 it is on the site of the original Sydenham School, although the school buildings themselves had to be demolished as they were unsafe. The centre runs classes and events as well as housing a cafe. Stagecoach in Warwickshire operate the local bus service to Leamington town centre and the nearest railway station is Leamington Spa which offers direct trains to London, Birmingham and Manchester amongst others.

The parish church is St Mary's, a Church of England church which was opened in 1839 and stands just outside the estate. 1897 saw a vicarage purchased near the church and the current vicarage is also on the same street as the church. In the 1970s a substantial property called "Southlands" was left to the church. This was promptly sold and a former brewery warehouse called The Maltings was purchased and used as a church youth centre called "The Landing Stage". The Maltings were sold and converted to housing by the Orbit Group. The existing church hall was completed in 1996.
