= Martin Poll (priest) =

British Church of England priest

The Reverend Canon Martin Poll LVO KHC
- Canon Chaplain of St George's Chapel, Windsor Castle
- Church: Church of England
- Diocese: Royal Peculiar
- In office: 2012 to present
- Other post: Archdeacon for the Royal Navy (2010 to 2012)

Orders
- Ordination: 1987 (deacon); 1988 (priest)

Personal details
- Born: Martin George Poll; 1961 (age 64–65) Enfield, London, England
- Denomination: Anglicanism
- Spouse: Diana
- Children: Two
- Profession: Clergyman chaplain
- Education: Edmonton County School; University of Kent at Canterbury; Ripon College Cuddesdon

Martin George Poll, LVO KHC (born 1961) is a British Church of England priest and former Royal Navy chaplain. Since 2012, he has been the Canon Chaplain of St George's Chapel, Windsor Castle, and Domestic Chaplain to the Queen until 2022, when he became Domestic Chaplain to King Charles III. From 2010 to 2012, he was Archdeacon for the Royal Navy and Principal Anglican Chaplain of the Royal Navy Chaplaincy Services. From 2026, the Reverend Canon Martin Poll LVO is the Vicar of Bury, Coldwaltham, Hardham and Houghton - Rural Dean of Petworth.

== Early life ==
Poll was born in 1961 in Enfield, Greater London. He was educated at Edmonton County School, a state school in the London Borough of Enfield. He then studied English and Religious Studies at the University of Kent at Canterbury, and graduated with a Bachelor of Arts (BA) degree in 1983.

== Ordained ministry ==
=== Early ministry ===
In 1984, Poll entered Ripon College Cuddesdon. He spent the next three years training for ordination. One of his placements during training was to the Royal Army Chaplains' Department. He did not feel that the British Army was right for him, but remained attracted to military chaplaincy.

Poll was ordained in the Church of England as a deacon in 1987 and as a priest in 1988. From 1987 to 1990, he served his curacy at John Keble Church, Mill Hill, London. It was during this time that he saw an advertisement for the Royal Navy Chaplaincy Services. He was given a tour of the service, and found that it appealed to him.

=== Military career ===
In 1990, Poll was commissioned as a military chaplain in the Royal Navy Chaplaincy Services, Royal Navy. Chaplains do not hold a rank, only "chaplain", and wear the chaplain's badge as insignia. His appointments included chaplain at HMS Raleigh (the Royal Navy's basic training facility), and chaplain at Britannia Royal Naval College (the Royal Navy's initial officer training establishment). As chaplain to the Royal Marines Commando helicopter squadrons, he served abroad in Bosnia, Northern Ireland and Norway. In 2007, he became chaplain to HMS Illustrious, a light aircraft carrier. He then moved to HMNB Portsmouth, where he was leader of its chaplaincy team and chaplain of St Ann's Church (the base's Anglican chapel).

On 1 November 2010, Poll was promoted to Deputy Chaplain of the Fleet. As the most senior Anglican chaplain, he was also appointed Principal Anglican Chaplain and the Archdeacon for the Royal Navy. As Archdeacon, he was elected to the General Synod of the Church of England. On 11 December 2011, he was made an Honorary Canon of Portsmouth Cathedral.

On 7 August 2012, Poll stepped down as Deputy Chaplain of the Fleet; he was succeeded by Ian Wheatley. He retired from the Royal Navy on 29 October 2012.

=== Later ministry ===
Poll was installed as a Canon of Windsor on 1 October 2012. He serves as Canon Chaplain of St George's Chapel, Windsor Castle, and Chaplain to the Great Park. On 1 November 2010, Poll was appointed an Honorary Chaplain to the Queen (QHC). June 2014, Poll was appointed Domestic Chaplain to Her Majesty the Queen (Windsor Great Park).

On 12 February 2026 Poll was appointed a Lieutenant of the Royal Victorian Order (LVO).

== Personal life ==
Poll is married to Diana. Together they have two children: a daughter and a son.

Church of England titles
Preceded by John Green	Archdeacon for the Royal Navy; 2010–2012	Succeeded by Ian Wheatley
Preceded by John Anthony Ovenden	Canon Chaplain of St George's Chapel, Windsor Castle; 2012–present	Incumbent
Military offices
Preceded by John Green	Deputy Chaplain of the Fleet and Principal Anglican Chaplain; Royal Navy Chaplaincy Services; 2010–2012	Succeeded by Ian Wheatley
