= John Oliver (bishop) =

British retired Anglican bishop (born 1935)

The Right Reverend John Oliver
- Bishop of Hereford
- Church: Church of England
- Diocese: Diocese of Hereford
- In office: 1990 – 2003 (retirement)
- Predecessor: John Eastaugh
- Successor: Anthony Priddis
- Other posts: Archdeacon of Sherborne; 1985–1990

Orders
- Consecration: 1990

Personal details
- Born: 14 April 1935 (age 91)
- Denomination: Anglican
- Spouse: Meriel Moore (m. 1961) Died 2014
- Children: 3
- Education: Gonville and Caius College, Cambridge

Member of the House of Lords
- Lord Spiritual
- Bishop of Hereford; 22 January 1997 – 30 November 2003

John Keith Oliver (born 14 April 1935) is a British retired Anglican bishop. He was the 103rd Bishop of Hereford from 1990 to 2003.

== Early life and education ==
Oliver was born on 14 April 1935. He was educated at Westminster and Gonville and Caius College, Cambridge. He has Master of Arts (MA Cantab) and Master of Letters (MLitt) degrees.

== Ordained ministry ==
He was made a deacon at Michaelmas 1964 (20 September) at Cromer Parish Church and ordained a priest the Michaelmas following (19 September 1965) at Norwich Cathedral, both times by Launcelot Fleming, Bishop of Norwich. After a curacy in Norfolk, he spent a period as chaplain and assistant master at Eton College. Following incumbencies in Devon, he became Archdeacon of Sherborne and Rector of West Stafford in Dorset before being consecrated a bishop on 6 December 1990 at Westminster Abbey. He served in the House of Lords from January 1997 until November 2003 with special responsibility for agricultural and environmental policy. He was succeeded by Anthony Priddis, previously Bishop suffragan of Warwick.

He published one book, The Church and Social Order, 1919-1939 in 1968.

From 2005 until 2010, he sat as a member of the inquiry into the murder of Billy Wright at Maze Prison, which was set up following the Northern Ireland Peace Agreement.

== Personal life ==
He married Meriel Moore in 1961; she was the first woman to teach divinity at Eton College and the first woman Reader at Hereford Cathedral. They had two sons and one daughter.
