= Anthony Priddis =

The Right Honourable Anthony Priddis
- Bishop of Hereford
- Church: Church of England
- Diocese: Diocese of Hereford
- In office: 2004 – 2013 (retirement)
- Predecessor: John Oliver
- Successor: Richard Frith
- Other post: Bishop of Warwick (1996–2004)

Orders
- Ordination: 1972
- Consecration: 3 July 1996

Personal details
- Born: 15 March 1948 (age 78)
- Denomination: Anglican
- Spouse: Kathy
- Children: 3
- Education: Corpus Christi College, Cambridge

Member of the House of Lords
- Lord Spiritual
- Bishop of Hereford; 24 November 2009 – 24 September 2013

Anthony Martin Priddis (born 15 March 1948) was the Bishop of Hereford in the Church of England from 2004 to 2013.

== Ministry ==
=== Ordination ===
Having gained a Cambridge Master of Arts (MA Cantab), an Oxford Master of Arts (MA Oxon) and a Diploma in Theology (DipTh), Priddis was ordained in 1972 and began his ordained ministry as a deacon in New Addington, Surrey.

=== Diocese of Oxford ===
In 1975 Priddis moved to High Wycombe in the Diocese of Oxford and held a number of positions, including St John's High Wycombe and St Mary's Amersham.

=== Bishop of Warwick ===
Priddis became the Bishop of Warwick in the Diocese of Coventry in 1996.

=== Bishop of Hereford ===
Priddis was appointed the Bishop of Hereford in the Diocese of Hereford in March 2004. The appointment was the first time a bishop had been appointed by the Church of England following external advertising. He retired on 24 September 2013.

In April 2007, Priddis was in the news as having vetoed the appointment of a gay youth officer who then brought Employment Tribunal proceedings against him claiming unlawful discrimination on the basis of sexual orientation. The youth officer was not in a sexual relationship but could not assure Priddis that he would remain celibate. The proceedings were successful and Priddis was found to have acted unlawfully by discriminating against the youth officer because of his sexuality. Although English law refers to "orientation", the EU interprets orientation to also include behaviour. The diocese failed to agree a settlement and in February 2008 was ordered by the Employment Tribunal to pay the youth worker over £47,000 in compensation. The Employment Tribunal also said that it expected Priddis to undergo equal opportunities training. Priddis was subsequently named "Bigot of the Year" by the gay equality group Stonewall.

Priddis previously attracted attention in the media for ordaining Sarah Jones, a transgender woman, to the priesthood in 2005, a decision that he defended against criticism from the Evangelical Alliance.

== Personal life ==
Priddis and his wife Kathy have three children.

== Styles ==
- Anthony Priddis Esq (1948–1972)
- The Revd Anthony Priddis (1972–1996)
- The Rt Revd Anthony Priddis (1996–present)

Church of England titles
Preceded by Clive Handford	Bishop of Warwick; 1996–2004	Succeeded by John Stroyan
Preceded by John Oliver	Bishop of Hereford; 2004—2013	Succeeded by Richard Frith
