= John Stroyan =

John Stroyan may refer to:

- John Stroyan (bishop)
- John Stroyan (politician)
