= Tidmington =

Village in Warwickshire, England

Coordinates: 52.0426°N 1.62408°W

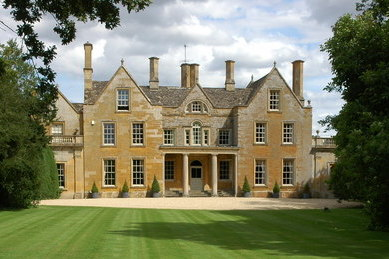
- Tidmington House

- Location within Warwickshire
- OS grid reference: SP258383
  - London: 75 mi (121 km) NW
- Civil parish: Tidmington
- District: Stratford-on-Avon
- Shire county: Warwickshire
- Region: West Midlands
- Country: England
- Sovereign state: United Kingdom
- Post town: SHIPSTON-ON-STOUR
- Postcode district: CV36
- Dialling code: 01608
- Police: Warwickshire
- Fire: Warwickshire
- Ambulance: West Midlands
- UK Parliament: Stratford-on-Avon

Tidmington is a village and civil parish in the Stratford-on-Avon District of Warwickshire, England. It is 11 miles (18 km) south from the town of Stratford-upon-Avon, and at the extreme southern edge of the county bordering Gloucestershire. Within the parish is the Grade II* listed c.1600 Tidmington House, and the Grade II* early 13th-century church of unknown dedication. At the 2001 Census, which for statistical purposes now includes the neighbouring parish of Burmington, the combined population was 153.

== History ==
According to A Dictionary of British Place Names, Tidmington was called 'Tidelminctune' in 977. The name means an "estate associated with a man called Tidhelm", being an Old English name combined with "-ing" and "tūn". Later spellings include 'Tydamintun' in the 13th century, and 'Tydilmynton' and 'Tydlemynton' in the 14th. Tidmington is listed in Domesday Book as 'Tidelmintun' in the Hundred of Oswaldslow. The settlement was subordinate to the manor of Tredington [today 3.5 miles (6 km) to the north], and comprised 42 villagers and households, 30 smallholders (middle level of serf below a villager), 10 slaves, a priest, and one rider (mounted escort for a lord). There were 5 lord's plough teams, 29 men's plough teams, three mills, and 36 acres (15 hectares) of meadow. The lord in 1066 was Wulfstan (c.1008 – 1095), the Bishop of Worcester and of the Cathedral of St Mary's. Wulfstan retained his lordship and ecclesiastical position in 1086 and was Tenant-in-chief to King William I.

Tidmington was part of the manor and later parish of Tredington. It became a parish in its own right in 1719, before that the church at Tidmington was a chapelry of the ecclesiastical parish and church of Tredington. Land at Tidmington was held from the early 12th century to 1366 by various branches of the de Croome family, under their manor of Earls Croome, 25 miles to the west in Worcestershire, at which time it passed to the Abbot of Evesham, William du Boys. The subsequent Evesham abbots possessed the manor until the abbey's dissolution in 1540, Henry VIII granted the manor to a Richard Ingram whose family and descendants through diverse lines and marriages held possession until the middle of the 17th century. In 1716 Thomas Wentworth of Wentworth Woodhouse, possessed the manor. In 1794 the manor was possessed by the Snow family who, through diverse lines and marriages, held it until 1913.

In 1835 Tidmington contained 76 inhabitants. The church living was a rectory, part of that of Shipston on Stour, and was in the Archdeaconry and Diocese of Worcester. Both Shipston-On-Stour and Tidmington had been townships of Tredington, but were made separate parishes by act of parliament in c.1720. By 1837 Tidmington contained 12 houses and 70 inhabitants, and for ecclesiastical purposes was a curacy. In 1870 Tidmington was a parish in the district of Shipston-On-Stour. It was of 754 acres (305 hectares) with a population of 69 in 12 houses. The nearest railway station was at Moreton-in-Marsh, 5 miles (8 km) south-west. The living was a rectory, still part of Shipston-On-Stour.

== Governance ==
Local democracy is through the Tidmington Parish Meeting The parish is in the Shipston South ward of the Stratford-on-Avon local government district. Tidmington is in the Stratford-on-Avon Parliamentary constituency; the sitting member is Manuela Perteghella of the Liberal Democrats. Prior to Brexit in 2020, it was part of the West Midlands European Parliament constituency of the European Parliament.

== Geography ==
Tidmington village and virtually all the parish lies at the west off the A3400 Birmingham to Chipping Norton road, which runs locally from the town of Shipston-on-Stour to the village of Burmington. The village is 1.5 miles (2 km) south from Shipston-on-Stour, 13 miles (20 km) west from the town of Banbury and the M40 motorway, and 17 miles (30 km) south from the county town of Warwick. Bordering Warwickshire parishes are Shipston-on-Stour at the north separated by the Stour tributary of Pig Brook, both Barcheston and Burmington at the east separated by the River Stour, and Stretton on Fosse at the west. The Gloucestershire parish of Todenham borders the south, separated by the Stour tributary of Knee Brook.

== Landmarks ==
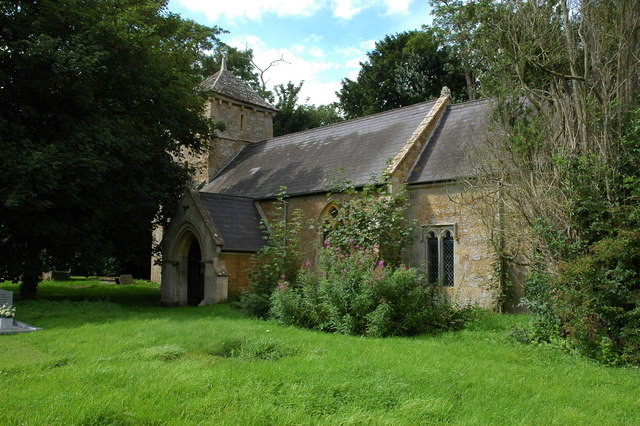
Tidmington Church

Tidmington has two Grade II* listed buildings and seven Grade II buildings and structures.

Tidmington House, on the A3400 at the east of the parish, is a Grade II* manor house of U-shaped plan in limestone ashlar, and dating to c.1600. The front face has a gabled wing each side of a central arcaded entrance porch logia with tuscan columns. The house is of two storeys with attic; the gables of two bays, and the central section of three. Each side of the front elevation is a range extension, of two storeys and gables at the north, and one storey at the south. The house was altered in the 17th and mid-18th century, with a new front added about 1765. During the 20th century the house was the home to Thomas Welles Beecham, the son, and Utica Celestina Welles, the wife, of the conductor Sir Thomas Beecham. In 2010 the house, of an estimated value of £3.95m, was damaged by fire which "affected three floors of the property" while it was under renovation.

At 30 yards (27 m) north from Tidmington House is a Grade II listed two-storey coach house and stable block, built in the early 19th century with a limestone and ashlar facade. The complex is U-shaped in plan, open at the south-west. The central door is within a shallow protruding bays with gable above; either side of the bay is an upper hayloft. Adjacent, at the south of Tidmington House, is the Grade II* Tidmingtom Church. In the north of the parish, off Shoulderway Lane, is the Grade II mid-18th-century Horsleys Farmhouse, of two storeys and three bays in limestone, with a western 19th-century kitchen extension in red brick. At the south-east of the parish, 180 yards (165 m) west from the A3400, is Green Farm, a Grade II mid-18th-century farmhouse of two storeys and attic, with a datestone reading '1758'. At 25 yards (23 m) north from Green Farm is a mid-18th-century limestone barn, with hayloft above and an interior threshing floor. Crossing Knee Brook at the south-west of the parish is a double-arch limestone bridge probably dating to the 18th century with earlier elements. A bridge here was mentioned in 1615.

The church, of limestone and ashlar, dates to about 1200 and comprises an early 16th-century chancel rebuilt in 1874–75, nave, an early 13th-century three-stage west tower and a 19th-century south porch, and contains 19th-century stained glass windows. There is Romanesque sculpture on the church font and south doorway. The three church tower bells date to 1530, 1590 and 1619. A further sanctus bell dates to the 1400s. Today the church is in the Shipston Deanery of the Archdeaconry of Warwick and Diocese of Coventry. Within the churchyard, south and south-west of the porch are two Grade II listed limestone chest (table) tombs; one 17th-century, the other 1831. Both are topped with moulded ledger slabs. The earlier includes an heraldic panel, the later, baluster corners.
