= Shorrock supercharger =

Type of supercharger

The Shorrock supercharger was an eccentric sliding-vane type engine supercharger patented by James Haydock and Christopher Shorrock in 1933. Originally known as the Centric supercharger, it was widely used by engine tuners in the UK in the 1930s and in the 1950 and 1960s.

== History ==
Centric Superchargers Ltd was formed in 1934, based in Preston, Lancashire, to make the Centric blower based on the patented invention. They targeted the car racing and tuning markets, with some success, and were involved in the design of the supercharged Velocette racer in 1938. In spite of considerable technical success, Centric Superchargers Ltd was placed in voluntary liquidation in February 1939. During the war Christopher Shorrock was involved in the design of superchargers for submarines and tanks, and in the use of superchargers as a way to get more power from engines running on 'producer gas'.

Shorrock Superchargers Ltd was formed on 12 June 1947, based in Preston and Willenhall, Staffordshire. From 1951 to 1953 Christopher Shorrock also worked as a development engineer for Harry Ferguson Ltd., and in January 1952 it was announced that the Harry Ferguson Group had acquired the financial interest of Shorrocks, and its premises had been relocated to Fletchamstead Highway, Coventry. In October 1954 the financial interest in Shorrocks was taken over by Rubery Owen and Co Ltd, with Christopher Shorrock as technical director. In 1957 the works was moved to Wednesbury, near Birmingham. In 1961 there was a fresh effort to promote the use of superchargers, and the Allard Motor Co. Ltd of Putney, London was appointed global distributors. Allards eventually bought the Shorrock supercharger business, and in 1973 Allard Motor Co created Allard Engineering Ltd, a new company based in Daventry with the aim of supercharging and turbocharging standard production cars. However this was not a success.

== Technical information ==
The Shorrock/Centric supercharger is the type with sliding vanes, which by an efficient arrangement are able to travel very close to the walls of the compressor without making contact, thereby allowing greater maximum velocity and reducing lubrication requirements compared to earlier types that contacted the walls. It was also claimed in the patent that the design kept the assembly sufficiently cool that even at high output no external finning was necessary.

The application of the supercharger enabled a power boost to existing engines, and in the 1950s many of the engines were of very modest output as they had to run on poor grade petrol available after the war (petrol rationing didn't finish in the UK until May 1950). So the application of the supercharger to modest vehicles, such as the original Morris Minor with its side-valve engine, were target areas for selling the Shorrock supercharger, not just the high performance racing and rallying sector. Figures for the Morris Minor MM engine showed 8psi boost using the Shorrock supercharger would increase the power from 24.5 bhp to 38.5 bhp (both at 4400rpm) on 70-72 octane fuel. Supercharging could also compensate for the thinner air at higher altitudes, and Shorrock's work with Harry Ferguson was to allow tractors to work efficiently at high altitudes, particularly in Kenya.

== Sporting success ==
In 1935 a Triumph Gloria fitted with a Centric supercharger, driven by Jack Ridley, won the 1500cc class in the Monte Carlo Rally. However the drive to the supercharger was only connected during the speed trials.

A more famous success was the world land speed record for under 1100cc set by Major "Goldie" Gardner in a 1087cc MG with Centric supercharger. In 1938 on the Frankfurt-Darmstadt Autobahn in Germany he broke the record with an average speed of 187.616 mph (301.939 km/h), and in May 1939 he raised the record to an average of 203.159 mph (326.953 km/h) over the flying mile.

In 1957 Stirling Moss broke the class speed records for under 1.5 litre supercharged cars in Utah. Using a special streamlined MG, known as the roaring raindrop, with Shorrock designed supercharger he achieved 245 mph (394 km/h) average over the mile course.

Numerous dragsters used Shorrock superchargers, including the well known Super Nero Vincent-engined motorcycle. Sydney Allard is considered the father of UK drag racing having built and demonstrated a Chrysler-engined dragster in 1961. After Sydney had established the sport in the UK in 1964, the Allard Motor Company made Allard Dragon kits to encourage people into the sport, this had a 1500cc Ford engine and Shorrock supercharger.
