= Larner Road Estate =

Housing estate in Erith, London

Coordinates: 51.473°N 0.180°E

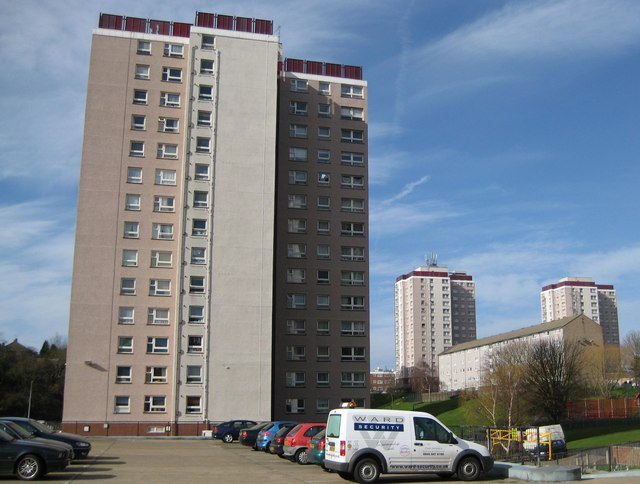
- Interactive map of Larner Road Estate

General information
- Location: Erith, Bexley, Greater London, England
- Status: Ongoing Regeneration

Construction
- Constructed: 1964-1968

Listing
- Demolished: 2013-present

Other information
- Governing body: London Borough of Bexley

The Larner Road Estate was a housing estate located in Erith, Bexley, south east London. Demolition of the estate began in 2013, as preparation for a new development known as Erith Park.

== Location ==
The Larner Road Estate was located adjacent to Northend Road and South Road, to the north of Slade Green and north west of Slade Green railway station and to the east of the border of Northumberland Heath.

== Construction ==
Building of the estate was approved in 1964, the first phase introducing the construction of two 15 storey tower blocks named Sara House and Cambria House, located on Larner Road. In 1967, the Larner Road Estate was expanded and construction began on a further five 16 storey towers named Hamlet House, Medina House, Norvic House, Pretoria House and Verona House. A four-storey maisonette block was also constructed on Larner Road. Construction on the estate was completed by 1968.

A typical example of system built social housing in the United Kingdom from the 1950s to the 1970s, the Larner Road Estate was built using a system of precast concrete panels that were usually manufactured on site. It was a method similar to the one that was used in the construction of the Thamesmead estate enabling residential buildings to be erected quickly.

== Decline ==
As early as the late 1960s, the Larner Road Estate became notorious for criminal activities, including violent crime, drugs, sexual crime and anti-social behaviour. In 2008, a teenager was stabbed to death in a violent attack on the estate. An infamous gang on the estate was known as RA or Rebel Assault.

== Demolition ==
In December 2012, the London Borough of Bexley approved planning permission to redevelop the Larner Road Estate as Erith Park over the next five years in a reputed £120 million scheme. The new development at Erith Park is being developed by Orbit South Housing Association in partnership with the London Borough of Bexley and will offer 3,000 people new and modern affordable housing. Work began demolishing the estate in March 2013, the first tower block to come down was Pretoria House. This will be followed by the demolishment of Medina House, followed by Hamlet House, Norvic House and Verona House.
