= Todenham =

Village in Gloucestershire, England

Coordinates: 52.0205°N 1.65546°W

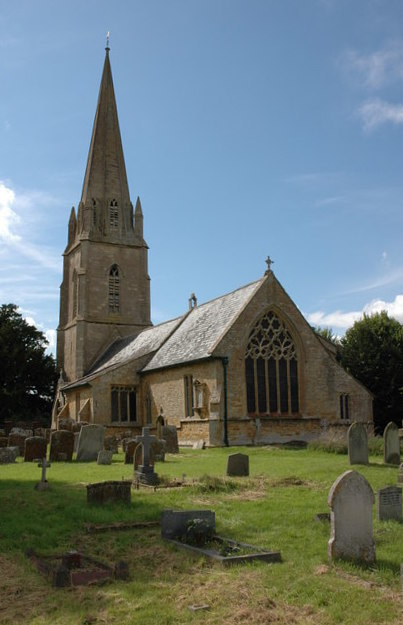
- St Thomas a Becket Church, Todenham

- Location within Gloucestershire
- OS grid reference: SP237358
  - London: 75 mi (121 km) NW
- Civil parish: Todenham
- District: Cotswold
- Shire county: Gloucestershire
- Region: South West
- Country: England
- Sovereign state: United Kingdom
- Post town: Moreton-in-Marsh
- Postcode district: GL56
- Dialling code: 01608
- Police: Gloucestershire
- Fire: Gloucestershire
- Ambulance: South Western
- UK Parliament: North Cotswolds

Todenham is a village and civil parish in the Cotswold district of Gloucestershire, England. The village is significant for its Grade I listed 14th-century parish church.

== History ==
Todenham, 'Todanhom' in 804 (in the kingdom of Mercia) and 'Teodeham' in 1086, derives from the Old English for an "enclosed valley of a man called Teoda" the 'ham' part referring to "...land hemmed in by water or marsh or higher ground...".

In 804 the Benedictine monastery at Deerhurst, Deerhurst Priory, acquired Todenham manor from Ethelric, the son of Ethelmund. The priory, and therefore the manor of Todenham, then passed to king Edward the Confessor, who willed it to Westminster Abbey. Todenham in the Domesday Book is listed as being in the Deerhurst Hundred of Gloucestershire. The settlement contained 59 villagers, 54 smallholders (middle level of serf below a villager), and 51 slaves. There were ploughlands for 24.5 lord's plough teams and 28 men's plough teams. Resources were 40 acres (16 ha) of meadow, a woodland of 0.5 leagues, and four mills. Three of the mills may have been included as part of the wider Deerhurst manor. Major lordship in 1066 was held by Westminster Abbey, which retained it in 1086 after the Norman conquest, while becoming Tenant-in-chief to king William I.

In the second half of the 19th century, and up to the First World War, Todenham was in the Eastern division of Gloucestershire, the upper division of the Hundred of Westminster, the petty sessional division of Moreton-in-Marsh, and the Union—poor relief provision set up under the Poor Law Amendment Act 1834—and county court district of Shipston-on-Stour. It had a railway station on the line of the Oxford and Worcester section of the Great Western Railway.

The ecclesiastical parish was in the rural deanery of Campden and the archdeaconry of Cirencester, in the Diocese of Gloucester. The parish church was described as of Decorated style, containing a chancel with chantry chapel on north side, a nave of three bays, a south chapel within the nave, a north aisle, a south porch, and a tower with six bells and a clock. Recorded were stone sedilia with canopies and a piscina, and remains of stairs to a former rood loft. The chancel chantry chapel was the family pew of the Pole family. Nave south chapel, with canopied piscina and credence, contains a monument to Lady Louisa Pole (died 6 August 1852). The decorated-style chancel east window included a stained glass memorial (erected 1879) to Rev Gilbert Malcolm, parish rector from 1812. The chancel has an inscribed brass memorial to William Moulton (died 1614). The church was restored in 1879 for £600 [Kelly's 1897] or £2,000 [Kelly's 1914]. There was seating for 150.

The church register dates to 1721, and includes a list of former rectors going back farther. A significant rector was Thomas Merkes (1397–1403), 'abbot of Westminster' [Kelly's], then Bishop of Carlisle (1397–1400), who was 'degraded' by Henry IV for his support of Richard II. The parish living was a rectory which included 188 acres (76 ha) of glebe—an area of land used to support a parish priest—and a residence, under the patronage of the Bishop of Gloucester. The parish priest in 1882 was also vicar of Lower Lemington, but not in residence at Todenham.

Todenham manor had belonged in 1542 to the Dean and Chapter of Westminster, then in 1545 to the Petre family of Essex after it was given to William Petre, the Tudor Secretary of State. It was retained by the Petre family until 1783, when it was sold to the Pole family who originated in Derbyshire, and who are descended from Cardinal Reginald Pole (1500–1558), the last Catholic Archbishop of Canterbury, and son to Sir Richard Pole and Margaret Pole, 8th Countess of Salisbury. Lordship of the manor resided with this branch of the Poles until 1951. The Pole family seat was Todenham House in the village, in 1856 occupied by Sir Peter Van Notten-Pole, 3rd Baronet (1801–1887), and in 1897 by Sir Cecil Pery Van Notten-Pole, 4th Baronet (1863–1948) JP.

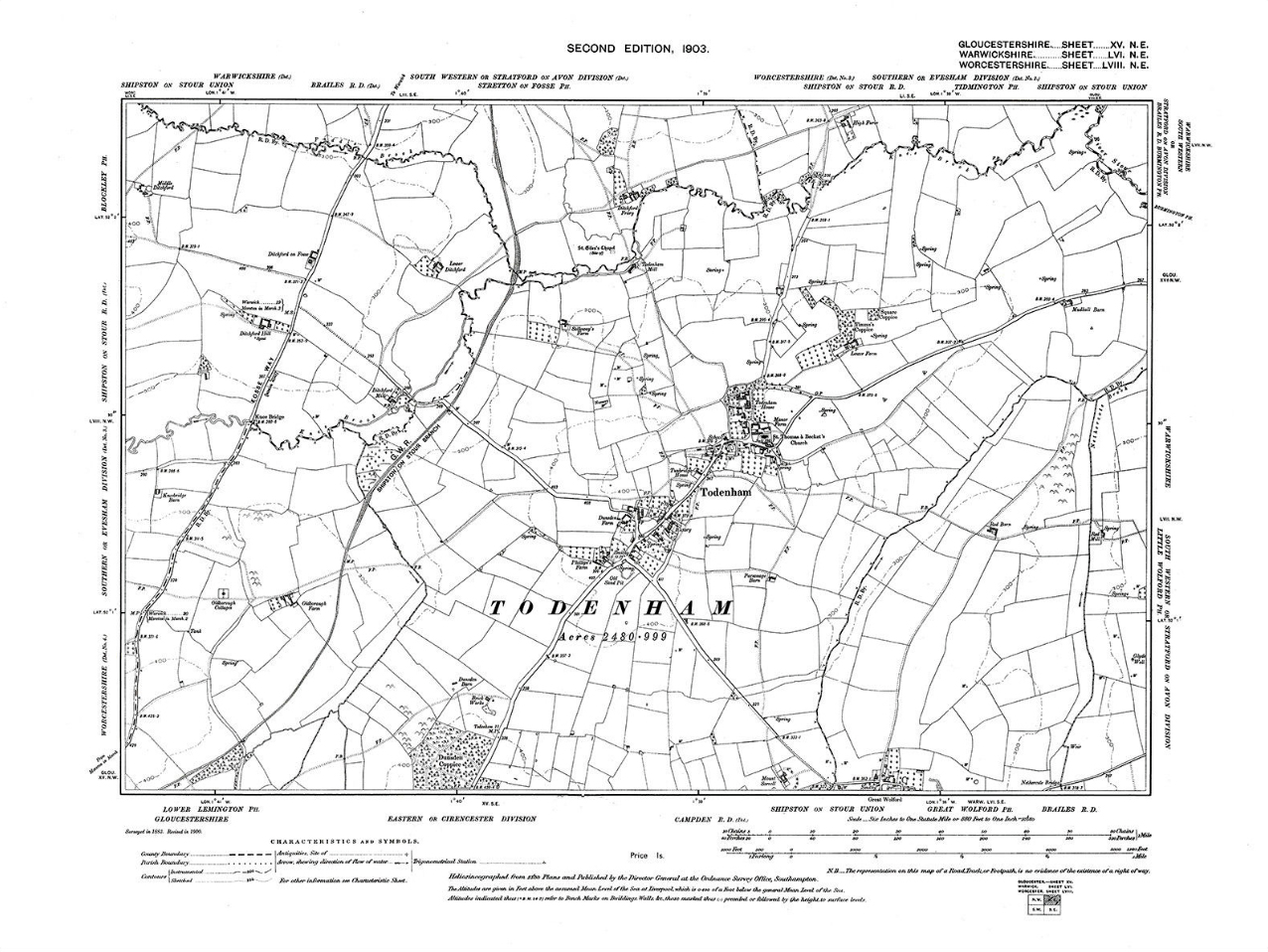
OS map of Todenham (1903)

There was a new National School, built in 1874 for 100 children, with an 1897 average attendance 23 boys and 27 girls including infants. At the beginning of the 20th century this was now a Public Elementary School (Education Act 1902), with an average attendance of 50. There had been no parish school in the late 17th century, but an endowment of £20 in 1704 was given for the education of poor children, these to be selected by the rector and churchwardens. A previous National school, which was subscription, fee and rector financed, existed from the early to mid-19th century in a rented building.

Parish area in the 19th century was 2,478 acres (1,000 ha) , with soil of clay and gravel over a subsoil of clay and oolite limestone. Parish population in 1851 was 462; in 1891, 349; and in 1911, 262.

Directory listing of trades and occupations in 1856 included Mount Sorrel, Woodhills and Lower Cerrington farms. In all there were nine farmers, a shoemaker, a plasterer & slater, a wheelwright, a blacksmith, a beer retailer, a mason, a butcher, two shopkeepers one of whom was the postmaster, and four carpenters, three of whom were in the same family. There was also the licensee of the Farriers' Arms, and an agent for Sir Peter Pole. Although there was a post office, the nearest money-order office was at Moreton-in-Marsh.

By 1897 the post office is listed as a Post, Telegraph & Express Delivery Office, with letters posted and received through Moreton-in-Marsh. Two carriers—transporters of trade goods, with sometimes people, between different settlements—operated between Todenham and Shipston-on-Stour on Saturdays. Parish traders and occupations then listed included 14 farmers, one of whom was also one of the carriers, a miller to Sir Cecil Pery Van Notten-Pole who also employed an agent, a blacksmith, a decorator, a carpenter, two shopkeepers, and the licensee of the Farriers' Arms. Businesses included a firm of wheelwrights & carpenters, and the Todenham Brick & Tile Works. There was a secretary to the Cirencester Working Men's Conservative Association Benefit Society. The clerk to the parish council was also the assistant overseer. The registrar of births, deaths and marriages for the sub-district of Shipston-on-Stour was also a relieving & vaccination officer, and the collector to the guardians of Shipston-on-Stour union. In 1914 occupations remained much as previously, but with three fewer farmers listed and only one shopkeeper. A wheelwright is listed, not as part of a company, as is a cow keeper and a steam plough owner. The post office also now served as the local Telephone Call Office.

== Governance ==
From 1894 to 1935 Todenham was part of Campden Rural District after which, in 1974, part of North Cotswold Rural District, which was abolished under the Local Government Act 1972. Today lowest level administration is through Todenham Parish Council with seven elected councillors, whose remit includes overseeing the maintenance of bus shelters, grass verges, and notice boards, and planning application consultation. The next higher tier of government is Cotswold District Council, above this, Gloucestershire County Council.

Todenham is represented in the UK Parliament House of Commons as part of the North Cotswolds constituency, its sitting MP being Sir Geoffrey Clifton-Brown of the Conservative Party. Prior to Brexit in 2020, representation in the European Parliament was through the South West England constituency.

== Geography and community ==
Todenham civil parish approximates an oval in shape and is orientated north-east to south-west, approximately 2 miles (3 km) east to west at its widest, and 3 miles (5 km) north-east to south-west, and at the extreme north-east corner of Gloucestershire. It is bordered by the Warwickshire parishes of Stretton-on-Fosse and Tidmington (the boundaries formed by Knee Brook, a tributary of the River Stour), Burmington at the north, and Little Wolford and Great Wolford at the south-east. The River Stour at the north-east forms the parish boundary with Burmington. Adjacent Gloucestershire parishes are and Blockley (north-west) and Batsford (west) with borders defined by the streams Wolford Brook and Lemington Brook which run into Knee brook, and Moreton-in-Marsh at the south-west. The county town and city of Gloucester is 28 miles (45 km) to the south-west. Closest towns to Todenham village are Moreton-in-Marsh 3 miles to the south-west, and Shipston-on-Stour 3 miles to the north-east.

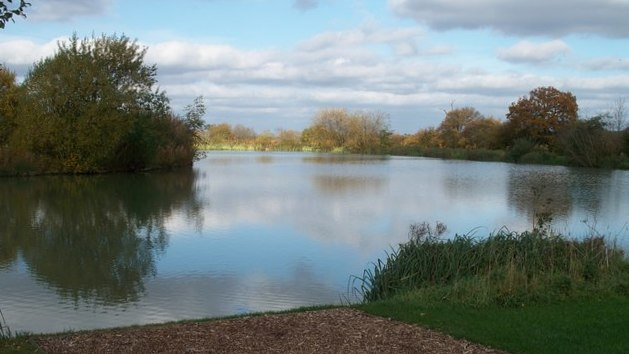
Commercial fishing lake, Todenham

The parish is entirely rural, of farms, fields, coppice woodland, lakes, dispersed businesses and residential properties, the only nucleated settlement being the village of Todenham. At the south-west of the parish, and next to the hamlet of Lower Lemington in Batsford, is a complex of commercial fishing lakes. Within the village is a village hall, The Farriers Arms public house next to St Thomas a Becket Church, a car hire company, and two bed & breakfast establishments; in the wider parish is a garden centre, at the east, and to the west of the village, an oriental craft products supplier. The principal road is Todenham Road which runs through the village, where it is called Main Street, and the whole length of the centre of the parish from the A3400 road at the north-east to Moreton-in-Marsh at the south-west. Two minor roads at the centre of the parish meet Todenham Road and lead to Great Wolford at the south-east and to the A429 (Fosse Way) at the north-west. The nearest railway station is at Moreton-in-Marsh on the Cotswold Line of the Great Western Railway. Bus services connect Todenham to Shipston-on-Stour, Moreton-in-Marsh, Stretton-on-Fosse, Burmington, Great and Little Wolford, Bourton-on-the-Hill, and Chipping Norton.

== Landmarks ==
Within Todenham is one Grade I, and 21 Grade II listed buildings and structures.

The Grade I St Thomas a Becket Church (listed 1960), is largely 14th-century, of limestone, comprising a tower with octagonal spire, nave, chancel, chancel north chapel, north aisle, south transept, south porch, and vestry. A restoration of the early 16th century included the addition of the north chapel. Further restoration in 1879 was undertaken by J. E. K. Cutts. The church contains 14th-century piscina and sedilia, traces of medieval wall painting, a 12th-century font, an 18th- to early 19th-century pulpit, 19th-century stained glass, an 18th-century engraving of Thomas Merke, Todenham rector and former Bishop of Carlisle, and various monuments and memorials to members of the Van Notten-Pole family who were late 18th- to 20th-century lords of Todenham manor. Within the churchyard are four monuments to the Phillips family (two late 18th-century chest tombs and two headstones), one late 18th-century chest tomb to William Harbridge, and an unidentified 17th-century headstone, part of a group. The church is part of the Vale of Moreton St David's benefice of four churches (sharing the same rector), the others being St Mary's at Batsford, St Leonard's at Lower Lemington, and St James' at Longborough.

At 180 yards (160 m) north-west from the church are Todenham Manor (listed 1985) and The Dower House (listed 1960). The early 19th-century ashlar and limestone U-plan Manor house was home to the Pole family. It was enlarged, including new facades, by Guy Dawber in 1890. The Dower House is a detached rectangular plan two-storey ashlar-faced house with a 1717 datestone. Opposite the church, on Todenham Road, is the Old Reading Room, or Church View (listed 1960), an 18th-century dressed limestone semi-detached building with a 1713 datestone, mullioned windows and gable dormers, which was further extended in the 18th and 19th century. Opposite the Old Reading Room, set against the churchyard wall and forming an L-plan with The Farriers public house, is the single storey red brick Blacksmith's Shop (listed 2008), a blacksmith's forge, dating to about 1757, which was extended in the mid- to late 19th century. The interior is separated into three rooms: the left, originally with terracotta tiled floor and with a double door entrance, a forge and two furnaces was likely used to shoe horses. The walls of the rooms have inset projecting iron spikes used to hang forging tools and forged items. Facing the church, between the left of The Blacksmiths Shop and the church lychgate, is a Sir Giles Gilbert Scott-designed cast iron K6 Telephone Kiosk (listed 1988), re-purposed as a book exchange repository.

At 60 yards (55 m) south-east from the Old Reading Room, and on a private drive off Todenham Road, is Downbank Farmhouse (listed 1960). Dating to the late 17th to early 18th century, it is a rectangular plan two-storey house with wall courses of dressed limestone, mullioned casement windows and gable end chimney stacks. The house has single-storey extensions added in the 19th century: at the left red brick, at the right stone. Firs Farm (listed 1985), on Todenham Road 250 yards (230 m) south-west from the church, is a late 17th- to early 18th-century rectangular plan two-storey detached farmhouse with wall courses of dressed limestone, and three three-light mullioned windows with central casements on the first floor, and one off-centre from a central door, on the ground. The front face of the building has a stone lean-to up with to the eaves at the left, with inset mullioned window, and a single storey extension as a farm store to the right.

At the south of the village approximately 900 yards (800 m) south-west from the church, around the junctions of Todenham Road and the roads to Great Wolford and the Fosse Way, are nine Grade II buildings. Two conjoined houses, nos. 19 and 20 Main Street (listed 1985), dating from the late 17th to the early 18th century, are of dressed limestone, and two-storeyed with mullioned casement windows, with the front facade at right angles to Main Street. A dormer window, a porch at no. 19, and a rear extension are 20th-century additions. Farther south is the former rectory (listed 1985), detached and dating to the 18th and early 19th century, with elements probably from the 17th. The house is of rectangular plan, of two storeys, with hipped roof and garret with dormers. The front facade has five 12-pane sash windows and a central porch with six panel double doors. A datestone of 1777 above the front door contains the motto "For envy too small, for contempt too great". The house, of 5,010 sq. ft. of internal space set in 11 acres (4.5 ha) of grounds, and described as 'Toddenham Hall', was on the market in 2017 for a guide price of £4.5m. At 60 yards (55 m) south from The Rectory at the junction of Todenham Road and the minor road to Fosse Way, is Cliff Cottage (listed 1985), detached and dating to the late 17th- to 18th century. This two-story house in dressed limestone has an entrance plank door offset to the left, each side of which are four stone mullioned windows each of two lights, and six-pane casements, two on the ground floor and two on the first. Above each window bay is a roof gabled dormer, with wood window frames reflecting those below. The central plank tie plate over the upper storey and the offset front portal may be an indication of two cottages converted to one. The detached 18th-century Orchard House (listed 1985), south from Cliff Cottage at the junction of Todenham Road and the minor road to Great Wolford (Wolford Road), is of two storeys in dressed limestone. The offset entrance portal with four-panel door and half-porch overhang, six steps higher than the street pavement level, has two bays of twelve-pane sash windows to the left, and one to the right. There are three chimney stacks: one at each gable end and one at eave level between the two left side window bays.

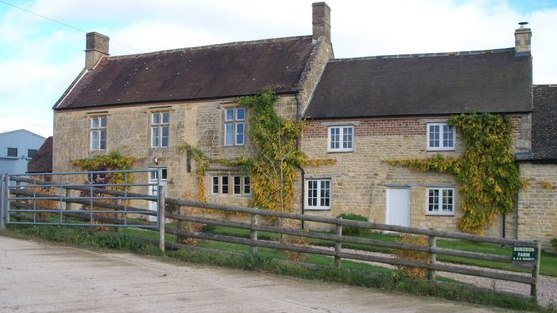
Home Farmhouse

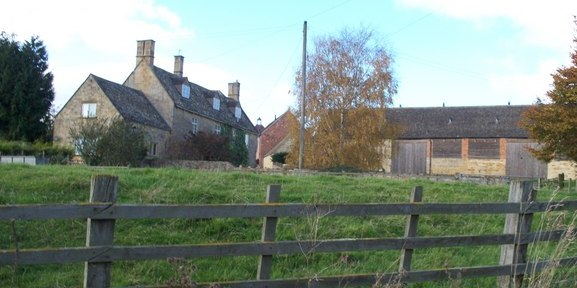
Dunsden Farmhouse and barn

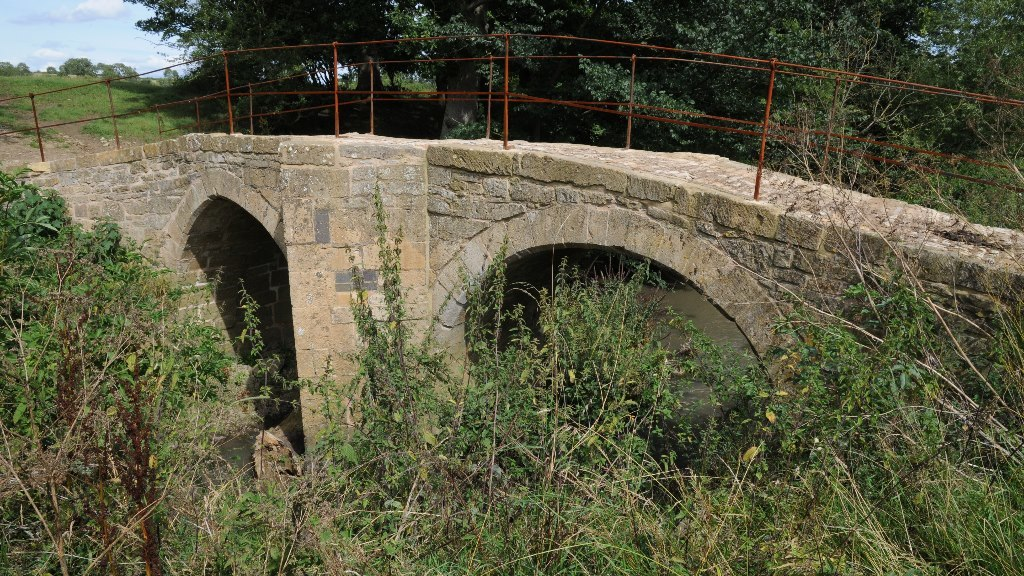
Packhorse bridge

On the west side of Todenham Road just inside the southern road entry sign to Todenham are Phillip's Farmhouse and Wyatts Farmhouse (both listed 1985), closely adjacent. Both are two-storey detached houses of dressed limestone, Phillip's, of rectangular plan, dates to the mid-19th century, and Wyatts, T-plan, to the late 17th to early 18th century. Phillip's windows are 19th-century metal casements. Its porch, open sided with hipped roof, with first floor window forms a central bay; the bay either side with ground and first floor windows. A chimney stack is at each gable end. Wyatts' windows are stone mullioned, of irregular placement, and of three- and four lights.

Farther north, at 120 yards (100 m) along the road to Fosse way from its junction with Todenham Road, are two farmhouses, one with a listed barn. Home Farmhouse (listed 1985 with its attached row cottages) dates to the late 18th- to early 19th century, its cottages to the 19th. The range is of dressed limestone, limestone rubble and tile roofs, with one cottage with some red brick infill in English garden wall bond. The farmhouse and its immediate cottage and the cottage at the right end of the range are of two storeys, with a one-storey residence with stable door entrance and ground to eave picture window between. The farmhouse, at the left of the range, is of three bays, the centre of entrance door and window above, those to the left and right of ground and first floor windows, all stone mullioned of four quartered lights with casements and hood moulds, the ground floor right only being a range of single lights. On the opposite side of the road to home Farmhouse is Dunsden Farmhouse (listed 1960). The rectangular plan detached house, in dressed limestone with limestone slate roof, dates mostly to the late 17th century; a datestone on a rear wing giving 1647. It is of two storeys plus an attic with three casement gable dormers, and with three chimney stacks, one at each gable end and one off-centre left. The fascia is of four bays, with the entrance door in the second bay from right. The window openings are inset with 20th-century mullions, transoms and glazing bars. At 120 yards (100 m) north from Dunsden Farmhouse is a barn (listed 1960), in part possibly 17th century, but dated by tie beam initials to 1718 at the time the barn was re-roofed. Altered in the 19th century, it is of elongated rectangular plan, and of dressed limestone with some brick infill and weather boarding. Appearing single storey on its south side, with two ground-to-eave wooden barn doors and a stable door, the north side is two storey, with two ground-to-eave window and floor pier insets. Today the barn is converted to residential use.

Listed outside the village in Todenham parish are a further farmhouse and a bridge. Mount Sorrel Farmhouse (listed 1985) is a late 18th- to early 19th-century farmhouse with a mid-19th-century extension, at the extreme southern edge of the parish on the road to Great Wolford (Wolford Road), and 1 mile (1.6 km) south from the village parish church. Its main body facade is of dressed limestone and ashlar, of two storeys and attic, and three bays: the central bay of panelled entrance door with first floor window above; the bays left and right of ground floor and first floor windows. All windows are sash with twelve panes. The tiled roof has two gable dormers and a chimney stack at each gable end. The two-storey extension, at the right, which runs at right angles to and projects slightly forward of the main body is in Flemish bond, with door on front face with twelve-pane sash window on the above first floor. Pack horse bridge (listed 1985), over Knee Brook at the northern edge of the parish and 1,300 yards (1.2 km) north from the village parish church, dates to the 16th century but was rebuilt in the 18th. Constructed of dressed limestone, it is of two arches with central pier.
