= Archdeacon Missioner =

Archdeacon Missioner may refer to:

- Archdeacon Missioner (Archdeacon of Warwick), an Archdeacon in the Diocese of Coventry of the Church of England
- Archdeacon Missioner, an Archdeacon in the Diocese of St Davids of the Church in Wales
