= Richard Frith =

British retired Anglican bishop (born 1949)

The Right Reverend Richard Frith
- Bishop of Hereford
- Church: Church of England
- Diocese: Diocese of Hereford
- In office: 2014–2019
- Predecessor: Anthony Priddis
- Successor: Richard Jackson
- Other posts: Archdeacon of Taunton (1992–1998); Bishop of Hull (1998–2014)

Orders
- Ordination: 1974 (deacon); 1975 (priest) by Mervyn Stockwood
- Consecration: c. 1998

Personal details
- Born: 8 April 1949 (age 77)
- Denomination: Anglican
- Spouse: 1. (m. 1975–2000) 2. (m. 2006)
- Children: 4, including James Frith
- Education: Fitzwilliam College, Cambridge

Richard Michael Cockayne Frith (born 8 April 1949) is a British retired Anglican bishop who served as Bishop of Hull and Bishop of Hereford.

== Early life ==
Frith was born into a clerical family on 8 April 1949; his father was Roger Cokayne Frith, sometime canon and Vicar of Feltwell. He was educated at Marlborough College and Fitzwilliam College, Cambridge. He undertook training for ministry at St John's College, Nottingham.

== Ordained ministry ==
Frith was made a deacon at Michaelmas 1974 (6 October) and ordained a priest the Michaelmas following (28 September 1975), both times by Mervyn Stockwood, Bishop of Southwark, at Southwark Cathedral. He began his ordained ministry as a curate in Mortlake, after which he was Vicar of Thamesmead. Following this he was Rector of Keynsham. Finally, before his ordination to the episcopate, he was the Archdeacon of Taunton from 1992.

Frith is also a trustee of maritime welfare charity the Mission to Seafarers.

=== Episcopal ministry ===
In January 1999, Frith became suffragan Bishop of Hull. On 16 July 2014, it was announced that Frith was to become the next Bishop of Hereford. His canonical election was confirmed on 17 October 2014 and he was installed 22 November 2014 in Hereford Cathedral. His retirement was announced, effective 30 November 2019.

=== Views ===
Frith is a supporter of introducing a blessing service to follow a civil same-sex marriage or civil partnership.

== Personal life ==
Frith was married first to Jill Richardson from 1975 until 2000, having four children, and remarried in 2006. His son, James, is the Labour MP for Bury North.

== Styles ==
- The Reverend Richard Frith (1974–1992)
- The Venerable Richard Frith (1992–1998)
- The Right Reverend Richard Frith (1998–present)

Church of England titles
Preceded by James Jones	Bishop of Hull; 1998–2014	Succeeded by Alison White
Preceded by Anthony Priddis	Bishop of Hereford; 2014–2019	Succeeded by Richard Jackson
