= Keith Arnold (bishop) =

Bishop of Warwick (1926–2021)

The Rt Revd Keith Arnold MA(Cantab)
- Bishop of Warwick
- Diocese: Diocese of Coventry
- In office: 1980–1990
- Successor: Clive Handford
- Other posts: Honorary assistant bishop in Oxford (1996–2021); Honorary assistant bishop in Newcastle (1991–1996)

Orders
- Ordination: 1952 (deacon); c. 1953 (priest)
- Consecration: 1980

Personal details
- Born: 1 October 1926
- Died: 17 January 2021 (aged 94)
- Denomination: Anglican
- Parents: Dr Frederick Holt and Alice Holt
- Spouse: Deborah Glenwright (m. 1955)
- Children: 2; 1 son, 1 daughter
- Education: Trinity College, Cambridge

Keith Appleby Arnold (1 October 1926 – 17 January 2021) was an English Anglican clergyman who served as the inaugural Bishop of Warwick from 1980 to 1990.

He was educated at Winchester College and Trinity College, Cambridge. After World War II service in the Coldstream Guards he was ordained in 1952 and began his ecclesiastical career with a curacy at Haltwhistle. From here he was successively Rector of St John's, Edinburgh, Kirkby Lonsdale and Vicar of Hemel Hempstead before he ascended to the episcopate.

Arnold died in January 2021 at the age of 94.

Church of England titles
New title	Bishop of Warwick; 1980–1990	Succeeded by Clive Handford
