= Sarah Jones (minister) =

Transgender British cleric

The Reverend Canon Sarah Jones
- Church: St John the Baptist Church, Cardiff
- Diocese: Llandaff

Orders
- Ordination: September 2005 by Anthony Priddis

Personal details
- Born: London
- Education: St Hugh's College, Oxford

Sarah Jones is an English Anglican priest. Currently priest-in-charge at St John the Baptist Church in Cardiff. She was the first transgender person to be ordained in the Church of England.

== Personal life ==
Jones left school at 16, and worked a variety of jobs, mostly within the music business. She married a woman when she was 20, but divorced after realising she was transgender. In 1991, she legally changed her name, and underwent gender-affirming surgery. She then began a psychology degree at St Hugh’s College. During her degree, she was received into the Church of England.

== Ordained ministry ==
In 2000 she applied to train for ordination with the Church of England, and found the church supportive of her transition. In 2002 she began her training, and was ordained at Hereford Cathedral in 2004. This made her the first transgender person to be ordained in the Church of England. Jones was subsequently outed to the media, and the church faced criticism for ordaining her. The Bishop of Hereford, Anthony Priddis, remained supportive of Jones, stating that she was a superb candidate, and her transition did not affect her calling as a priest.

In July 2004 Jones joined the Diocese of Hereford as an Assistant Curate, and became a Rector in December 2007. Her last service in Hereford was in September 2018 as in October 2018 she joined the St John the Baptist Church in Cardiff, becoming the priest-in-charge. In 2019 she became an honorary Canon of Llandaff Cathedral.

Jones was awarded a Pride Award by Attitude magazine in June 2021.

Jones helped opened the Grace Café, in February 2023. The café is located in St John's, and serves free tea, coffee, and toast for visitors and members of the "street community". It opens once a week, and is staffed by volunteers from the church. The café's startup costs were jointly funded by St John's and Llandaff Cathedral.

In 2024 Jones was named on the Pinc List, Wales Online's list of influential LGBT+ people in Wales.

Biography accompanying Jones' nomination on WalesOnline's Pinc List (2024)

Rev Sarah is an Anglican, transgender priest at the city parish of St John The Baptist, Cardiff, and an honorary canon of Llandaff Cathedral. In the aftermath of the death of trans teenager Brianna Ghey, who was tragically murdered in 2023, Rev Sarah wrote a prayer which was used at vigils across the UK and at Brianna's funeral service. Rev Sarah has helped create an LGBTQ+ chaplaincy within Llandaff diocese and has worked on a new theatre show which "explores trans identity and the toxic debate about trans people in the UK today". Passionate about inclusivity and trans issues, she is a stalwart of the LGBTQ+ community and a symbol of kindness. At a time when for many religion feels so juxtaposed to living an authentic life as an LGBTQ+ person, Rev Sarah's role as a pillar of Wales' queer religious community is crucial.

— Jonothon Hill, WalesOnline
