= St Paul's Church, Leamington Spa =

Church in Leamington Spa, Warwickshire, England

Coordinates: 52°17′38″N 01°31′42.29″W

St. Paul’s Church, Leamington Spa
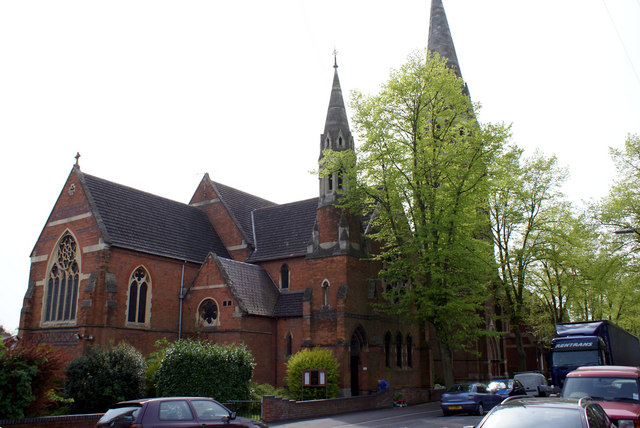
- St. Paul’s Church, Leamington Spa
- St. Paul’s Church, Leamington Spa
- Denomination: Church of England
- Churchmanship: charismatic evangelical
- Website: stpl.org.uk

History
- Dedication: St Paul

Administration
- Province: Canterbury
- Diocese: Coventry
- Parish: Leamington Spa

St. Paul's Church, Leamington Spa is a Grade II listed parish church in Leamington Spa, England.

== History ==
St. Paul's Church was built between 1873 and 1874 to designs by the architect John Cundall of Leaminton. It was formed from the parish of St. Mary's. The church had 1150 seats, half free, and half rented to pay the Vicar's stipend.

The church and associated parish rooms were subject to later additions and alterations. These included a redevelopment in the 1980s by architect John Holmes.

== List of vicars ==
- 1877–1894 James Bradley
- 1894–1910 George Edward Augustus Pargiter MA
- 1910–1919 James Mervyn Glass
- 1919–1928 Robert Woods Colquhoun MA
- 1928–1934 George Ernest Arrowsmith MA
- 1934–1947 William Walton Rogers MA
- 1947–1962 John Charles Dunham MA
- 1963–1977 Norman Leonard Warren MA
- 1978–1988 Andrew J M Dow MA
- 1988–1999 Bill Merrington BSc, MPhil
- 2000–present Jonathan Noel Jee MA
