= Edmonton County School =

Location
- Great Cambridge Road; Enfield, London, EN1 1HQ; England; 51°38′07″N 0°04′03″W

Information
- Type: Comprehensive school Academy
- Motto: Non Nobis Solum (Not For Ourselves Alone)
- Established: 1919
- Local authority: Enfield
- Department for Education URN: 143197 Tables
- Ofsted: Reports
- Gender: Coeducational
- Age: 4 to 18
- Enrolment: 1800
- Former name: Edmonton County Grammar School
- Website: http://www.edmontoncounty.co.uk/

Edmonton County School is a coeducational comprehensive all-through school and sixth form for pupils aged 4 to 18. The school is located over two sites in Edmonton in the London Borough of Enfield in north London, England.

== Admissions ==
The Cambridge Campus (formerly the upper school until the end of 2009/2010 academic year) buildings are the site which was used by the former grammar school on the Great Cambridge Road (A10) near Bush Hill Park railway station. The Bury Campus (formerly the lower school until the end of 2009/2010 academic year) buildings are the site which was used by the former secondary modern school on Little Bury Street.

== History ==
=== Grammar school ===
The school was founded in January 1919 as Edmonton Central School. It catered for both girls and boys, but originally they were taught in separate buildings. In 1922, Middlesex County Council took over the school from the Municipal Borough of Edmonton, and changed its name to Edmonton County Secondary School.

The school was evacuated to Braintree, Essex in the Second World War.

Later, the name was changed to Edmonton County Grammar School, reflecting the distinctions between types of secondary school in the Education Act 1944.

=== Comprehensive ===
In 1967, it was amalgamated with Rowantree Secondary Modern School to form a comprehensive school and was renamed Edmonton School, but was often referred to as 'Edmonton County'. The school was given its current name of Edmonton County School in 1996. It was granted the status of a specialist technical college in February 2003.

=== Academy ===
Previously a community school administered by Enfield London Borough Council, in September 2016 Edmonton County School converted to academy status. the school is now sponsored by the Edmonton Academy Trust.

== Notable former pupils ==
- Kriss Akabusi, athlete
- Kevan James, cricketer
- Kelly Johnson, guitarist
- Debbie Kurup, actress
- Kev Orkian, entertainer
- Martin Poll, priest
- Ray Winstone, actor
- Mike Thalassitis British footballer and TV personality

=== Edmonton County Grammar School ===
- John Berry, speedway promoter
- Bill Fay, singer-songwriter
- Prof John Hinch, Professor of Fluid Mechanics since 1998 at the University of Cambridge
- Basil Hoskins, actor
- Prof Annette Karmiloff-Smith CBE, psychologist researching language development
- Larry Lamb, actor
- Keith Mack, Controller of National Air Traffic Services from 1985 to 1988, and Director General from 1989 to 1993 of Eurocontrol
- Colin Parnell, founder of Decanter (magazine)
- Ronald Edward Perrin, organist
- Prof John G. Ramsay CBE, Professor of Geology from 1977 to 1992 at the University of Zurich
- Sir Roy Strong, historian
- Norman Tebbit, Baron Tebbit of Chingford, politician
