= Clive Handford =

English Anglican bishop

The Most Reverend Clive Handford CMG
- President Bishop
- Church: Episcopal Church in Jerusalem and the Middle East
- In office: 2002 to 2007
- Predecessor: Iraj Mottahedeh
- Successor: Mouneer Anis
- Other post: Bishop in Cyprus and the Gulf (1997–2007)
- Previous posts: Bishop of Warwick (1990–1996); Archdeacon of Nottingham (1984–1990)

Orders
- Ordination: c. 1962 (deacon) c. 1964 (priest)
- Consecration: 1990

Personal details
- Born: 17 April 1937 (age 89)
- Denomination: Anglican
- Parents: Cyril & Alice
- Spouse: Anne Atherley (m. 1962)
- Children: 1 daughter
- Occupation: Anglican bishop
- Education: Hatfield College, Durham

George Clive Handford CMG (born 17 April 1937) is an English Anglican bishop. He was the fourth Anglican Bishop in Cyprus and the Gulf.

== Early life ==
Handford was born on 17 April 1937. He studied at Hatfield College, Durham University, graduating with a 2:1 degree in Modern Arabic Studies. He then underwent ministerial formation at Queen's College, Edgbaston.

== Ordained ministry ==
Handford was made a deacon at Michaelmas in 1963 (22 September), by Morris Gelsthorpe, Assistant Bishop of Southwell, and ordained a priest at the Trinity Sunday following (24 May 1964), by Gordon Savage, Bishop of Southwell, both times at Southwell Minster. He then began his ministry as an assistant curate at St Peter and St Paul's Church, Mansfield in the Diocese of Southwell and Nottingham between 1963 and 1967.

In 1967, Handford started what was to be a long association with the Middle East. He was a chaplain in Baghdad, Iraq, in 1967, followed by six years as a chaplain in Beirut, Lebanon. He then served as Dean of St. George's Cathedral, Jerusalem from 1974 to 1978. Then, from 1978 to 1983, he was co-currently Archdeacon in the Gulf and chaplain in Abu Dhabi and Qatar.

Often embroiled in centuries old disputes, he clearly stated his own view in a letter to The Times in 1977:

"I am neither pro-Arab nor pro-Jew, I am pro-human."

Returning to England, he became Vicar of Kneesall, Archdeacon of Nottingham. Then in 1990, he was elected Bishop suffragan of Warwick and consecrated a bishop on 6 December at Westminster Abbey. He was then translated to the Mediterranean Anglican Diocese of Cyprus and the Gulf where he served the Anglican Community until retirement in 2007. During much of that time, he served as Presiding Bishop of the Episcopal Church in Jerusalem and the Middle East.

In retirement, he still maintains his links with the church and serves as an honorary assistant bishop in the Diocese of Ripon and Leeds.

Church of England titles
| Preceded by Keith Arnold | Bishop of Warwick; 1990–1996 | Succeeded by Anthony Priddis |
Anglican Communion titles
| Preceded by John Brown | Bishop in Cyprus and the Gulf; 1997–2007 | Succeeded by Michael Lewis |
