= St Lawrence's Church, Oxhill =

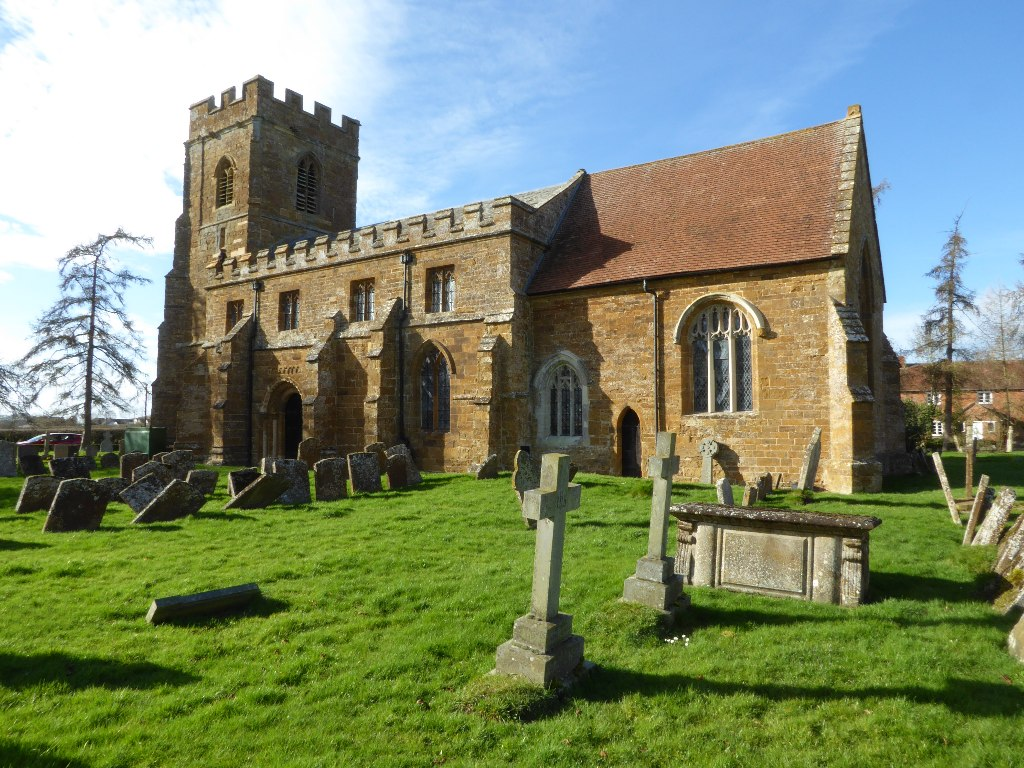
- St Lawrence's Church, Oxhill
- 52°06′25.56″N 1°32′19.28″W
- OS grid reference: SP 31691 45514
- Location: Oxhill, Warwickshire
- Country: England
- Denomination: Church of England
- Website: oxhill.org.uk/StLawrence.htm

Administration
- Diocese: Diocese of Coventry

Listed Building – Grade I
- Official name: Church of St Lawrence
- Designated: 13 October 1966
- Reference no.: 1364748

Listed Building – Grade II*
- Official name: Tomb of Myrtilla approximately 3 metres south of chancel of Church of St Lawrence
- Designated: 23 February 1988
- Reference no.: 1035552

St Lawrence's Church is an Anglican church in the village of Oxhill, in Warwickshire, England. It is in the Diocese of Gloucester. The building, of which the earliest parts date from the 12th century, is Grade I listed.

== History and description ==
The church is built of ironstone and some rubble. There is a nave, chancel, west tower and north porch. The nave and chancel date from the 12th century, and the chancel arch, doorways and one window in the north wall of the nave date from this time.

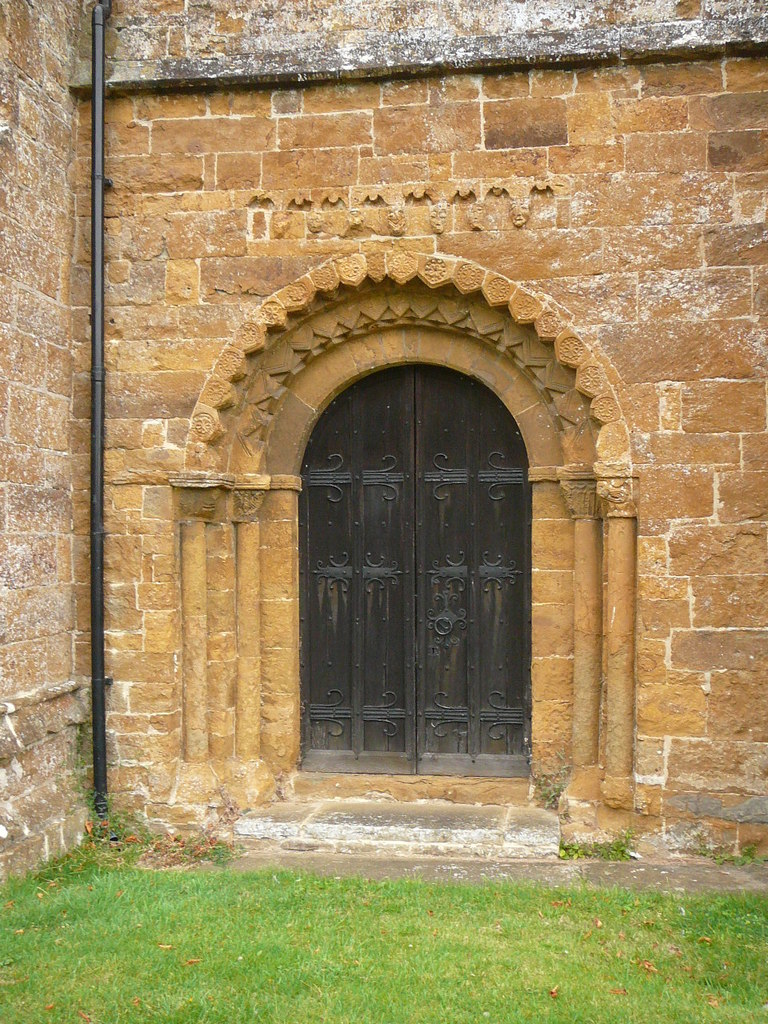
The Norman doorway on the south side

The south doorway has a Norman arch with three orders, of which the outer has flowers, the middle has chevron ornaments, and the inner is plain. Above is a corbel table, of the 12th century, reset from elsewhere, of which the corbels are carved as faces. The north doorway, within the later porch, is also Norman; its archway has three plain orders.

The font dates from the 12th century. Around the tub-shaped bowl are sixteen bays carved in low relief; two are of Adam and Eve, and the others with decorations such as trees and flowers. At one time it was replaced by another font; it was re-installed in the church in 1879, after a period in use as a garden ornament.

The west tower and north porch were added in the 15th century. The porch has a moulded archway, and gargoyles either side of a coped parapet. The nave has a clerestory dating from the 16th century. The east wall of the chancel dates from the 17th or 18th century.

There was extensive restoration in the late 19th century, undertaken by the Rector, V. H. Macy. The architects were Bodley and Garner. Modifications to the chancel in 1865 include the east window, in 14th-century style. The nave was modified in 1876–78, including restoring the floor, removing the gallery. replacing the clerestory windows on the south side, replacing the roof and adding embattled parapets.

In the tower archway is part of a 15th-century chancel screen, originally from another church and installed at Oxhill in 1876, initially as a chancel screen. It was moved to its present position in 1908.

=== Bells ===
There are five bells. Three of these were cast in 1701 by William Bagley of Chacombe. During the restoration of 1878, John Taylor & Co of Loughborough added two bells, and recast the existing tenor bell, which was cracked. Because of weakness of the supporting structure, the bells were not rung from the 1960s until renovation in 1989.

== Churchyard ==
In the churchyard, about 6 metres north of the church porch, is the base of a medieval preaching cross, made of ironstone. It is Grade II listed.

Several headstones and two chest tombs in the churchyard south of the church are Grade II listed; the headstones, dating from the late 17th to early 18th century, are of ironstone and moulded with putti heads and wings. The chest tombs are from the 18th and 19th centuries.

=== Grave of Myrtilla ===
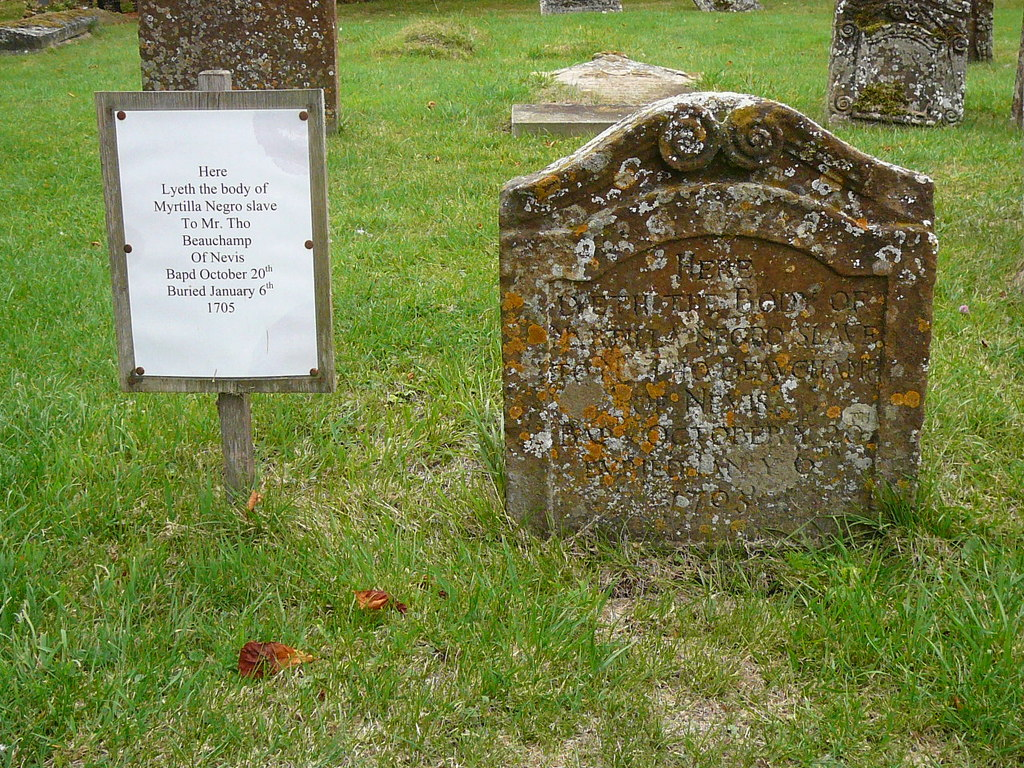
The grave of Myrtilla

In the churchyard south of the church is the grave of Myrtilla; the inscription reads "Here lyeth the body of Myrtilla, negro slave to Mr Thomas Beauchamp of Nevis, baptised Oct 20th, buried Jan 6th 1705". (The year of burial was shown as 1705 in accordance with the old style calendar, and would now be regarded as 1706.) Nevis is a Caribbean island known for sugar production at that time, and Thomas Beauchamp may have had business interests there. She was brought to England perhaps as a domestic servant. It is thought that her baptism may have been soon after her arrival; she died a few months later, perhaps unable to stand the severity of the winter. The grave is Grade II* listed.
