= Scott Brown (Royal Navy chaplain) =

British admiral (born 1968)

The Reverend Scott J Brown CBE
- Chaplain of the Fleet
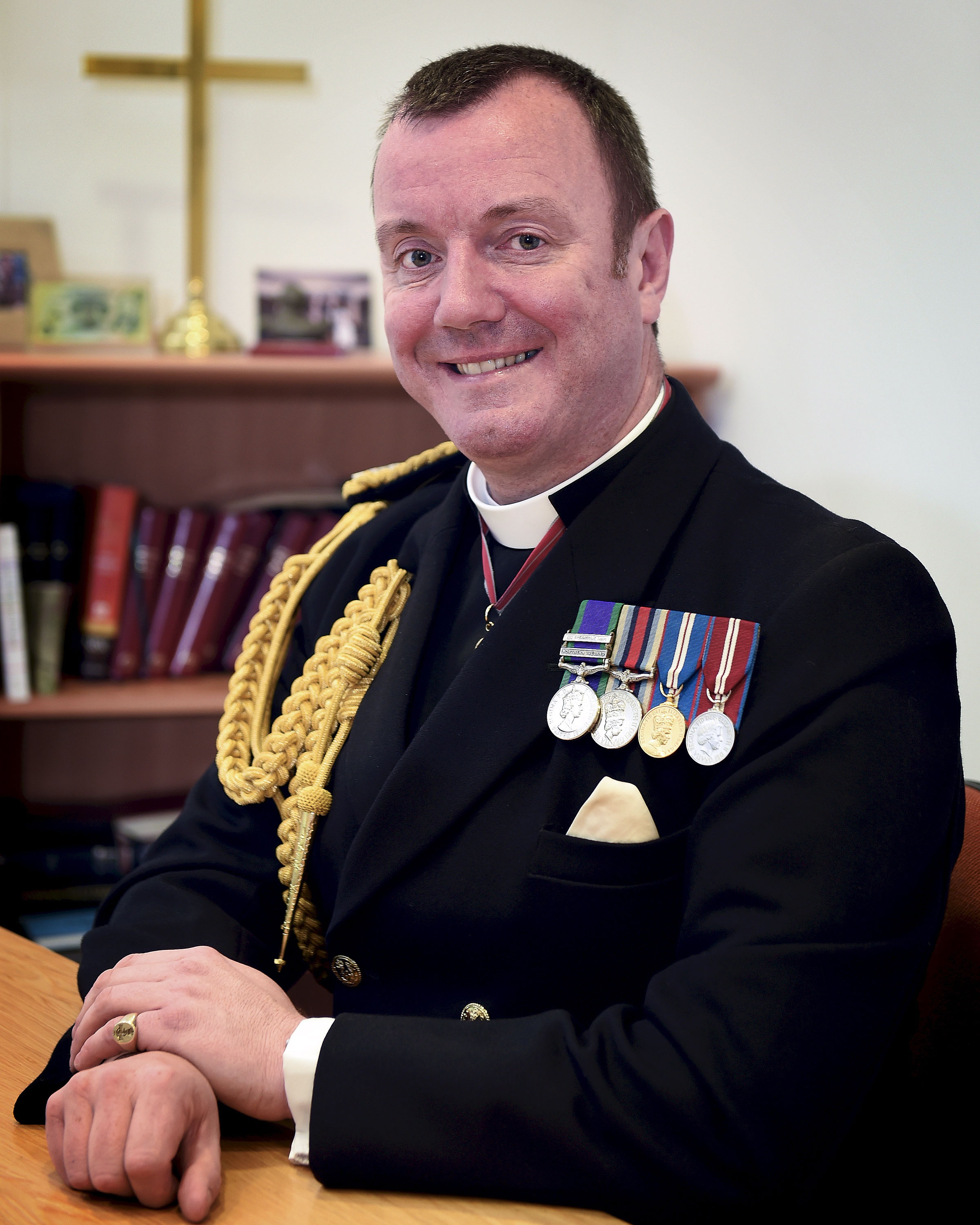
- Brown in 2014
- Church: Scottish Episcopal Church (Anglican)
- In office: 2010 to 2014
- Predecessor: John Green
- Successor: Ian Wheatley

Orders
- Ordination: 1993 (minister, CoS); 2026 (deacon and priest, SEC) by The Bishop of St Andrews, Dunkeld and Dunblane
- Consecration: by The Rt Rev Ian Paton

Personal details
- Born: Scott James Brown; 16 May 1968 (age 58) Bellshill, Lanarkshire, Scotland,
- Denomination: Episcopal
- Residence: Stirling
- Spouse: Colin Fleming (m. 2006)
- Education: University of Aberdeen

Scott James Brown, CBE (born 16 May 1968) is a Scottish Anglican priest and former Royal Navy chaplain. From 2010 to 2014, he served as Chaplain of the Fleet and was therefore the senior military chaplain in the Royal Navy. After serving as a Church of Scotland minister, he was ordained in the Scottish Episcopal Church in 2026.

== Early life ==
Scott was born in Bellshill, Lanarkshire, Scotland, on 16 May 1968, the son of Margaret and Jim Brown of Hamilton. Educated at Hamilton Grammar School and Bell College of Technology. He graduated from the University of Aberdeen with a Bachelor of Divinity (BD) degree in 1992. While studying at university, he was also a member of the Aberdeen URNU.

== Career ==
Following graduation, Brown underwent an assistantship at St Andrew's West, Falkirk, from 1992 to 1993. He was ordained by the Church of Scotland in 1993 by the Presbytery of Hamilton.

=== Military career ===
Brown joined the Royal Navy in April 1993 and served in the ships of the Commodore Minewarfare, Fishery Protection and Diving, HMS Raleigh, HMS Neptune, and HMS Sultan. He then served on exchange with the Royal Australian Navy and then in HMS Cardiff, HMS Kent, and HMS Iron Duke. He then served with the Command Training Group, and was Staff Chaplain to the Chaplain of the Fleet. From 1999 to 2000, he served as Chaplain to the Very Reverend Dr John Cairns during his term as Moderator of the General Assembly of the Church of Scotland.

He was promoted Principal Chaplain in 2007. He was appointed at the same time to be an Honorary Chaplain to the Queen (QHC). On 1 November 2010, he was appointed Chaplain of the Fleet, and accorded the equivalent rank of a Rear Admiral. He retired in January 2015.

=== Later career ===
Brown was inducted to the parishes of Buchlyvie and Gartmore in March 2019, returning to parish ministry after 23 years as a Naval Chaplain . He demitted his office as a Church of Scotland Minister in September 2026.

Brown was appointed as National Chaplain of the Royal British Legion in October 2023. He resigned in 2025 due to ill health.

Brown joined the Scottish Episcopal Church, and was ordained as a deacon and priest in 2026 by Bishop Ian Paton, the Bishop of St Andrews, Dunkeld and Dunblane.

== Personal life ==
Brown married Colin Fleming in 2006.

== Honours and decorations ==
Brown was appointed Commander of the Order of the British Empire (CBE) in the 2014 New Year Honours. He is a recipient of the Queen Elizabeth II Golden Jubilee Medal and the Queen Elizabeth II Diamond Jubilee Medal.

Military offices
Preceded by John Green	Chaplain of the Fleet, Royal Navy; 2010 to 2015	Succeeded by Ian Wheatley
