= Tessa Blackstone, Baroness Blackstone =

British politician (born 1942)

The Right Honourable The Baroness Blackstone PC
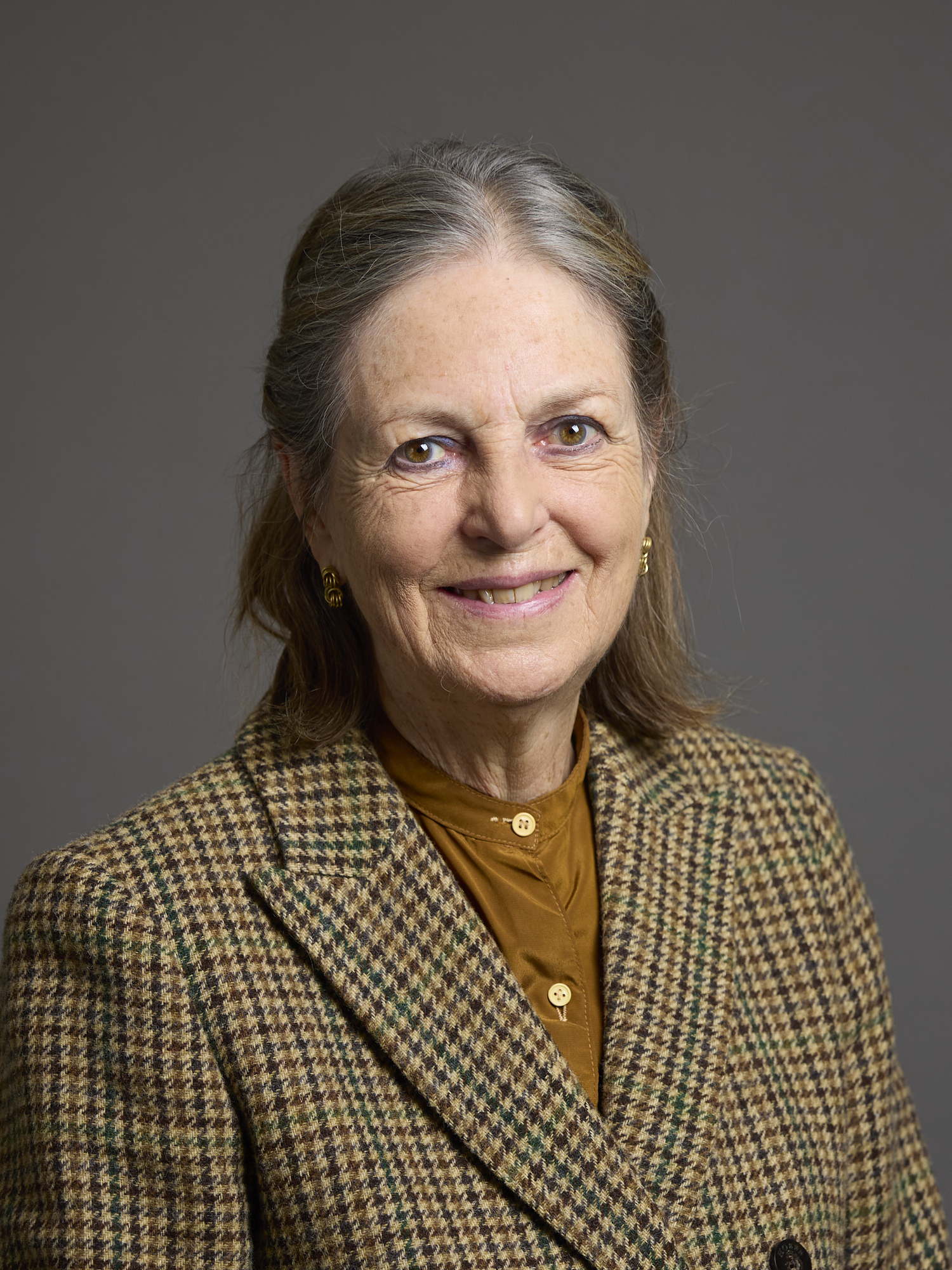
- Official portrait, 2024

Minister of State for the Arts
- In office 8 June 2001 – 13 June 2003
- Prime Minister: Tony Blair
- Preceded by: Alan Howarth
- Succeeded by: Estelle Morris

Minister of State for Education and Employment
- In office 2 May 1997 – 8 June 2001
- Prime Minister: Tony Blair
- Preceded by: The Lord Henley
- Succeeded by: office abolished

Member of the House of Lords
- Lord Temporal
- Life peerage 18 March 1987

Personal details
- Born: Tessa Ann Vosper Blackstone; 27 September 1942 (age 84)
- Party: Labour
- Spouse: Tom Evans
- Children: Ben Evans
- Education: London School of Economics

Tessa Ann Vosper Blackstone, Baroness Blackstone PC (born 27 September 1942) is an English politician and university administrator.

== Early life ==
Her father, Geoffrey Vaughan Blackstone, was the Chief Fire Officer for Hertfordshire and her mother, Joanna Vosper, was an actress and model for the House of Worth in Paris. She was educated at Ware Grammar School for Girls and the London School of Economics, where she gained a doctorate. Her doctoral thesis, titled "The provision of pre-school education: A study of the influences on the development of nursery education in Britain from 1900–1965", was submitted in 1969.

== Career ==
Her academic career began at the former Enfield College (now Middlesex University) before she went on to become a lecturer at the LSE and Professor of Educational Administration at the University of London Institute of Education.

Blackstone was Deputy Education Officer of the Inner London Education Authority (1983–1986). She has also worked as a policy adviser in the Cabinet Office. As a member of Jim Callaghan's Downing Street thinktank, she upset the Foreign Office by criticizing diplomats' lavish lifestyles.

She headed Birkbeck College, University of London, for a decade as Master (from 1987 to 1997) until her appointment to the new Labour government in 1997. She has also concurrently held research fellowships at the Centre for Studies in Public Policy and the Policy Studies Institute. Blackstone became Vice-Chancellor of the University of Greenwich, holding this position up to 2011.

She has served as chairman of the ballet board of the Royal Opera House, the Fabian Society, and the Institute for Public Policy Research (IPPR), and has sat on the governing bodies of numerous other organisations. She has been on the Board of Trustees of The Architecture Foundation. She is currently Chairman of the British Library and Chairman of Great Ormond Street Hospital. She is currently the patron of Hamlin Fistula UK, a charity whose aim is to raise funds and awareness to support the Addis Ababa Fistula Hospital.

== Politics ==
She is a Labour life peer and sits in the House of Lords, having been created Baroness Blackstone, of Stoke Newington in Greater London, on 18 March 1987. Originally on the Opposition front bench in House of Lords, Blackstone held a succession of portfolios during her time at Birkbeck.

Self-described as 'vintage' rather than old or new Labour, Blackstone was Minister for Education at the Department of Education from 1997 to 2001 then Minister for the Arts at the Department of Culture, Media and Sport 2001–2003. While in her position here she attended The European Higher Education Area Ministerial Conferences and was a member of the European Ministers of Education that signed The Bologna Declaration of 19 June 1999.

On 15 September 2010, Blackstone, along with 54 other public figures, signed an open letter published in The Guardian, stating their opposition to Pope Benedict XVI's state visit to the UK.

== Current activities ==
She is a Patron of Humanists UK and chairs the Royal Institute of British Architects (RIBA) trust. She is an honorary associate of the National Secular Society. In 2009 she became the chair at Great Ormond Street Hospital, and in 2010 she became chair at the British Library, a 4-year term. In September 2012 she joined the board of the Orbit Group housing association as its future chair.

In January 2013, she became co-chair at the Franco-British Council together with Christian de Boissieu, an organisation that seeks to promote better understanding between Britain and France and to contribute to the development of joint action. She is the chair to the British Section of the council. She became the Chair of the Bar Standards Board in January 2018.

== Publications ==
Her publications, which mainly cover education and social policy issues, include:

- Disadvantage and Education with Jo Mortimore (Heinemann, 1982)
- Race Relations in Britain with Bhikhu Parekh and Peter Saunders (Routledge, 1997)
- Blackstone, Tessa (1997). "The Boy Who Threw an Inkwell: Bevan and Education". In Goodman, Geoffrey (ed.). The State of the Nation: The Political Legacy of Aneurin Bevan. London: Gollancz. pp. 156–178. ISBN 0-575-06308-4.
- Millicent Garrett Fawcett: The Fight for Votes for Women (Biteback Publishing, 2024)

Party political offices
Preceded by Jenny Jeger	Chair of the Fabian Society; 1984–1985	Succeeded by Andrew McIntosh
Political offices
Preceded by Eric Forth	Minister for Higher and Further Education; 1997–2001	Succeeded by Margaret Hodge
Preceded by Alan Howarth	Minister for the Arts; 2001–2003	Succeeded by Estelle Morris
