= John Stroyan (bishop) =

British Anglican bishop

The Right Reverend John Stroyan
- Bishop of Warwick
- Church: Church of England
- Diocese: Diocese of Coventry
- In office: 2005–2023
- Predecessor: Anthony Priddis

Orders
- Ordination: 1983 (deacon); Keith Arnold; 1984 (priest) by John Gibbs
- Consecration: 21 April 2005

Personal details
- Born: 5 May 1955 (age 71) Scotland, United Kingdom
- Denomination: Anglican
- Residence: Warwick House, Offchurch
- Spouse: (m. 1990)
- Children: two
- Education: University of St Andrews

John Ronald Angus Stroyan (born 5 May 1955) is a retired Anglican bishop who served as the Bishop of Warwick, the suffragan bishop of the Church of England Diocese of Coventry, from 2005 until his retirement in 2023.

== Family, early life and education ==
Born the son of Ronald Stroyan, a judge, in Scotland, John was educated at Harrow School. He attended the University of St Andrews (whence he gained his Master of Theology {MTh} degree in 1976) and trained for the ministry at Queen's College, Edgbaston.

== Ministry ==
Stroyan was ordained deacon at Petertide (3 July) 1983 by Keith Arnold, Bishop of Warwick, and ordained priest the Petertide following (1 July 1984) by John Gibbs, Bishop of Coventry, both times at Coventry Cathedral, and served his title post as assistant curate of St Peter's, Hillfields (in the "Coventry East" team ministry). From 1987 until 1994 he was Vicar of St Matthew with St Chad, Smethwick (in the Diocese of Birmingham) then Bloxham with Milcombe and South Newington (in the Cotswolds) for a further eleven years, the last three as Area Dean of Deddington.

His pastoral dedication and his priority of spiritual renewal led to his appointment in 2005 to the episcopate when Anthony Priddis was translated to Hereford. He was consecrated in Southwark Cathedral in 21 April 2005 and installed at Coventry Cathedral on 1 May 2005.

Stroyan retired effective 7 August 2023.

== Styles ==
- The Reverend John Stroyan (1984–2005)
- The Right Reverend John Stroyan (2005–present)

Church of England titles
Preceded by Anthony Priddis	Bishop of Warwick; 2005–2023	TBA
