= St Mary's Church, Leamington Spa =

Coordinates: 52°17′0.68″N 01°31′18.94″W

St. Mary’s Church, Leamington Spa
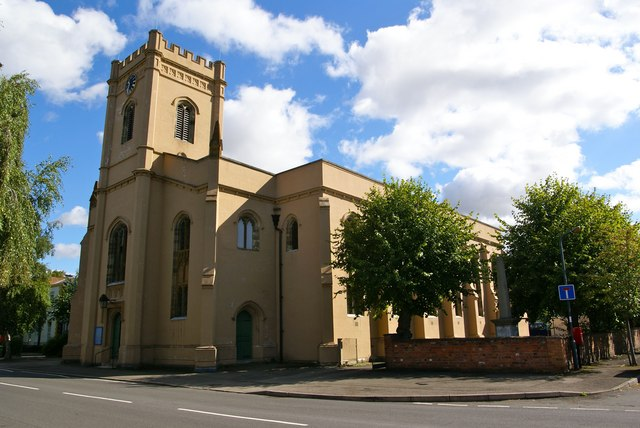
- St. Mary’s Church, Leamington Spa
- St. Mary’s Church, Leamington Spa
- Denomination: Church of England
- Website: stmarysleamington.com

History
- Dedication: St Mary

Administration
- Province: Canterbury
- Diocese: Coventry
- Parish: Leamington Spa

St. Mary's Church, Leamington Spa is a Grade II listed parish church in Leamington Spa, England.

== History ==
St. Mary's Church was built between 1838 and 1839 to designs by the architect J.G. Jackson. 1897 saw a vicarage purchased at 15 St Mary's Road for £1,500 and the current vicarage (number 28) is also on the same street as the church. In the 1970s a substantial property called "Southlands" was left to the church. This was promptly sold and a former brewery warehouse called The Maltings was purchased and used as a church youth centre called "The Landing Stage". The Maltings were sold and converted to housing by the Orbit Group. The existing church hall was completed in 1996.
