= Basil Hoskins =

British actor (1929–2005)

- Born: 10 June 1929; Edmonton, Middlesex, England
- Died: 17 January 2005 (aged 75); London, England
- Resting place: St Mary the Virgin, Church Lane, Salehurst, East Sussex, England
- Education: Edmonton County School
- Years active: 1952-1995
- Partner: Harry Andrews

Basil William Hoskins (10 June 1929 – 17 January 2005) was an English theatre and film actor.

== Life and career ==
Hoskins, a native of Edmonton, London, was educated at the Edmonton County School. Hoskins studied acting at RADA and joined the Nottingham Playhouse Company in 1951. Hoskins was the long-term partner of fellow English actor Harry Andrews. They are buried alongside each other at St Mary the Virgin, Salehurst, in East Sussex.

His best-known films are Ice Cold in Alex (1958) and North West Frontier (1959). On television, he played the part of Number 14 on The Prisoner television series (episode "Hammer Into Anvil").

== Filmography ==
- It Started in Paradise (1952) – 2nd Detective (uncredited)
- Ice Cold in Alex (1958) – C.M.P. Lieutenant (Alexandria)
- North West Frontier (1959) – A.D.C.
- The Millionairess (1960) – First Secretary
- Edge of Sanity (1989) – Mr. Bottingham
