= Campion School, Leamington Spa =

Campion School

Location
- Sydenham Drive; Leamington Spa, Warwickshire, CV31 1QH; England; 52°16′31″N 1°31′02″W

Information
- Type: Academy
- Local authority: Warwickshire
- Department for Education URN: 137766 Tables
- Ofsted: Reports
- Gender: Coeducational
- Age: 11 to 18
- Enrolment: 538
- Website: http://www.campion.warwickshire.sch.uk/

Campion School was formed in 1977 when it moved to the present site on Sydenham Drive in Leamington Spa, Warwickshire, England. In 2006, Campion was awarded dual specialisms of Business and Enterprise, and Visual Arts. The school became an academy on 1 January 2012.

Campion School is a mixed 11 to 18 secondary school. Although the school mainly serves South Leamington, it also take pupils from Whitnash, Radford Semele and Bishop's Tachbrook, other areas of Leamington, and the Heathcote area of Warwick. The maximum number of pupils admitted in any one year is 155.

== Facilities ==
Campion School has facilities that include: sports hall, youth centre, adult education centre, sixth form centre, playing fields, community rooms, conference/assembly hall, floodlit activity area, provision for the disabled, and a new technology block.

Sydenham Sports Centre is a dual use facility opened in the late 1970s that is situated in the school grounds.
