= Ian Wheatley =

British Anglican priest and former Royal Navy officer

The Venerable Ian Wheatley CB QHC
- Chaplain of the Fleet
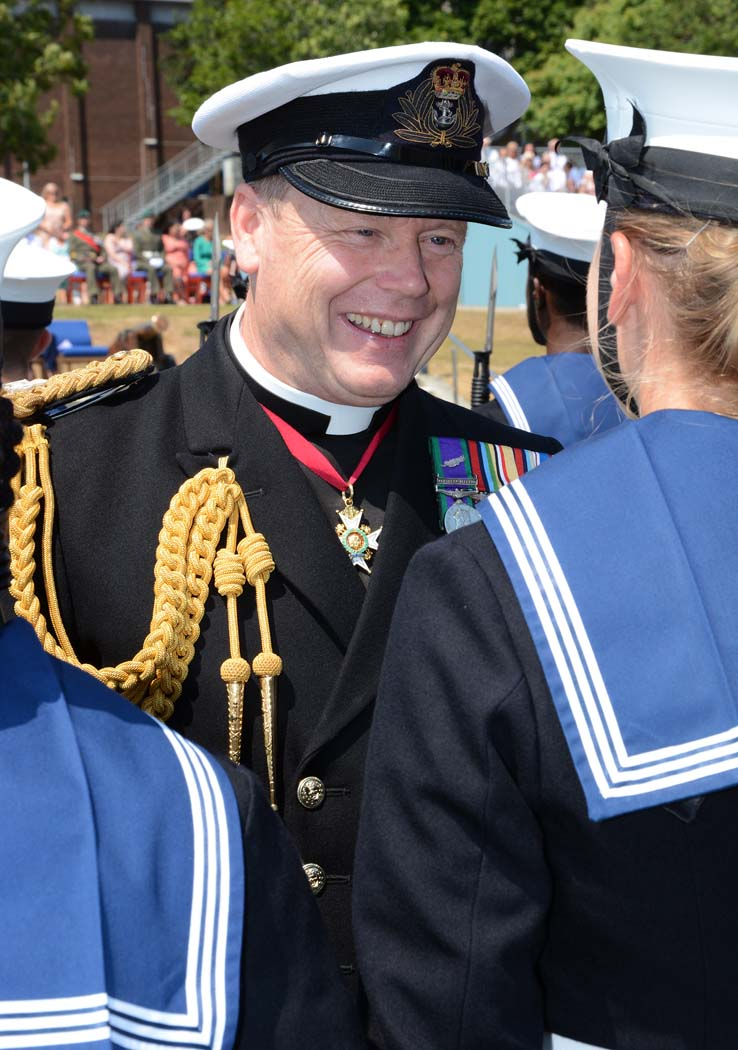
- Wheatley in 2018
- Church: Church of England
- In office: 2014–2018
- Predecessor: Scott Brown
- Successor: Martyn Gough
- Other posts: Archdeacon for the Royal Navy (2012–2018); Deputy Chaplain of the Fleet (2012–2014)

Orders
- Ordination: 1994 (deacon); 1995 (priest)

Personal details
- Born: Ian James Wheatley; 1962 (age 63–64)
- Denomination: Anglicanism
- Education: Chichester Theological College

Ian James Wheatley, CB, QHC (born 1962) is a British Anglican priest and former Royal Navy officer. From 2014 to 2018, he has served as Chaplain of the Fleet, the senior military chaplain of the Royal Navy: he had also served as Deputy Chaplain of the Fleet and Principal Anglican Chaplain from 2012 to 2014.

== Early military career ==
Before becoming a military chaplain, Wheatley served an officer in the Royal Navy. Having completed officer training at the Britannia Royal Naval College, he was commissioned on 1 May 1983 with the rank of sub-lieutenant. He was promoted to lieutenant on 1 September 1985. He transferred to the Retired List on 14 September 1991.

== Religious life ==
Having left the Royal Navy in 1991, Wheatley then began training for ordination into the Church of England. He studied at Chichester Theological College and graduated with a Bachelor of Theology (BTh) degree in 1994. He was ordained a deacon in 1994 and a priest in 1995. From 1994 to 1997, he served as an assistant curate at St Brannock's Church, Braunton, Devon.

=== Later military career ===
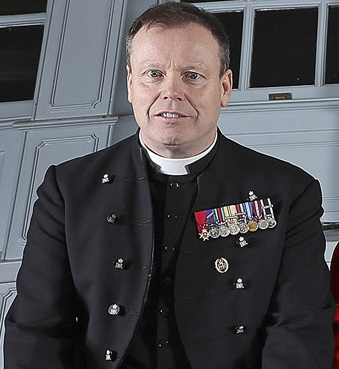
Chaplain of the Fleet Wheatley in 2017

In 1997, Wheatley joined the Royal Navy as a military chaplain. In 2001, he deployed to Northern Ireland. In 2011, he deployed to Afghanistan with 3 Commando Brigade Royal Marines, to whom he was padre, as part of Operation Herrick.

On 7 August 2012, he was appointed Deputy Chaplain of the Fleet. As the then Chaplain of the Fleet was a Church of Scotland minister, he also became the Principal Anglican Chaplain and Archdeacon for the Royal Navy. On 18 December 2014, he was appointed Chaplain of the Fleet in succession to The Rev Scott Brown. With this appointment, he became head of the Royal Navy Chaplaincy Services and is therefore the most senior chaplain in the Royal Navy. As Chaplain of the Fleet, he was also the Honorary Chaplain to the Royal Naval Association.

From October 2012 to 2018, he was a member of the House of Clergy of the General Synod of the Church of England. This role came with his appointment as Principal Anglican Chaplain and Archdeacon for the Royal Navy.

Wheatley retired from the Royal Navy on 16 November 2018.

== Later life ==
Wheatley has been retired from full time ministry since 2018. He and his wife run a bed and breakfast with holiday cottages in Cornwall.

== Honours ==
On 29 April 2003, Wheatley was awarded the Queen's Commendation for Valuable Service "in recognition of gallant and distinguished services in Northern Ireland during the period 1 April 2002 to 30 September 2002". In the 2017 New Year Honours, he was appointed Companion of the Order of the Bath (CB). He is a recipient of the General Service Medal with Northern Ireland clasp, the Operational Service Medal for Sierra Leone, the Iraq Medal, and the Operational Service Medal for Afghanistan.

On 9 February 2014, he was appointed an honorary canon of Portsmouth Cathedral.
