= Sue Field =

English Anglican priest

Susan Elizabeth Field (born 10 May 1959) is an English Anglican priest and former Archdeacon Pastor (and Archdeacon of Coventry) in the Diocese of Coventry from 18 March 2018 resigning in January 2023.

Field was educated at King Edward VI High School for Girls, Birmingham and the University of York. She taught maths at Queensbridge School for three years. She studied for the priesthood at Queen's College, Birmingham. She was ordained deacon in 1987; and priest in 1994. After a curacy in Coleshill, Warwickshire she was the Chaplain at Loughborough University from 1991 to 1998. She was Team Vicar of Loughborough from 1998 until 2014; and Vicar of Nanpantan from 2014 until her appointment as Archdeacon Pastor. During her time in Loughborough, she also held other senior leadership posts.

On 4 January 2023, Field accepted a Penalty by Consent and resigned her role as Archdeacon as the result of a complaint under a Clergy Discipline Measure. ("Conduct unbecoming & inappropriate to the office and work of a clerk in Holy Orders"). An injunction was also taken out against her.

In April 2023, The Bishop of Leicester appointed Rev. Sue Field to be Team Rector of the Ashby-de-la-Zouch and Breedon on the Hill Team Ministry in the Leicester Diocese. Her service of institution and induction took place on 10 May 2023 at St Helen's Church, Ashby-de-la-Zouch and was conducted by the Bishop of Loughborough, The Right Reverend Saju Muthalaly.
