= Diocese of Coventry =

Diocese of the Church of England

Coordinates: 52.4085°N 1.5072°W

Diocese of Coventry Dioecesis Coventriensis
- Coat of arms

- Flag

Location
- Ecclesiastical province: Canterbury
- Archdeaconries: Warwick, Coventry

Statistics
- Parishes: 199
- Churches: 245

Information
- Cathedral: Coventry Cathedral
- Language: English

Current leadership
- Bishop: Sophie Jelley
- Suffragan: Bishop of Warwick
- Archdeacons: Barry Dugmore, Archdeacon Missioner (Archdeacon of Warwick); Archdeacon Pastor/Archdeacon of Coventry (vacant)

Website
- Official website

The Diocese of Coventry is a Church of England diocese in the Province of Canterbury. It is headed by the Bishop of Coventry, who sits at Coventry Cathedral in Coventry, and is assisted by one suffragan bishop, the Bishop of Warwick. The diocese covers Coventry and Warwickshire.

The diocese is divided into two archdeaconries, Warwick and Coventry. Warwick archdeaconry is then divided into the deaneries of Shipston, Fosse, Alcester, Southam and Warwick & Leamington, whilst Coventry archdeaconry is divided into the deaneries of Rugby, Nuneaton, Kenilworth, and Coventry South, East and North.

The diocese was formed on 6 September 1918 from part of the Diocese of Worcester.

An ancient diocese exists (now called the Diocese of Lichfield) which had the title the "Diocese of Coventry" from 1102 until 1228, then "Diocese of Coventry and Lichfield" until 1539, then "Diocese of Lichfield and Coventry" until 1837, when Coventry itself was passed to the Diocese of Worcester. There were then two Bishops suffragan of Coventry in that diocese, 1891–1903.

== Bishops ==
The diocesan Bishop of Coventry (Sophie Jelley) is assisted by a Bishop suffragan of Warwick (vacant). The provincial episcopal visitor (for parishes in the diocese who reject the ministry of priests who are women) is the Bishop suffragan of Oswestry, who is licensed as an honorary assistant bishop of the diocese in order to facilitate his work there.

David Evans, a former Bishop of Peru and Bolivia, has been licensed as an honorary assistant bishop in the diocese since 2003; returned to England in 1988 and retired to Warwick in 2010.

=== 2023–25 vacancy ===
From 6 November 2023 until 31 December 2024, Ruth Worsley (Bishop of Taunton in the Diocese of Bath and Wells) was also part-time Acting Bishop of Coventry; and from 9 November 2023, Saju Muthalaly (Bishop of Loughborough in the Diocese of Leicester) was also part-time Assistant Bishop of Coventry. From 1 January 2025, retired bishop Tim Thornton became acting diocesan bishop.

== Archdeaconries and archdeacons ==
While the diocese is divided into archdeaconries and has archdeacons like other dioceses, Coventry diocese is unique in that the two do not correlate. In 2010, the post of Archdeacon of Warwick was replaced by that of Archdeacon Missioner (Morris Rodham was appointed) and statutory oversight over the archdeaconry of Warwick was delegated to the Archdeacon of Coventry (then Ian Watson). Following Watson's retirement in 2012, John Green was appointed as Acting Archdeacon of Coventry pending his installation into the new role of Archdeacon Pastor, which duly occurred on 9 December 2012. These arrangements follow the Bishop's 2009 document Signposts for the Future, and the creation of the two posts of Archdeacon Missioner and Archdeacon Pastor are consistent with the suggested "transitional period" after which there will be only one archdeacon in the diocese. Rodham and Green remained, legally, collated to the Archdeaconries of Warwick and of Coventry. Green retired at the end of August 2017, and Clive Hogger joined him as Acting Archdeacon for July and August, then remained Acting Archdeacon after Green's retirement. Sue Field was collated Archdeacon Pastor and Archdeacon of Coventry on 18 March 2018; Barry Dugmore was collated Archdeacon Missioner and Archdeacon of Warwick on 6 October 2019. Field was required to resign in January 2023 following disciplinary proceedings.

== List of churches ==
Location	Church
Alcester	St. Nicholas, Butter Street
Alderminster	St. Mary and Holy Cross
Allesley	All Saints, Birmingham Road
Allesley Park	St. Christopher, Winsford Avenue
Alveston	St. James
Ansley	St. Lawrence, Church End
Ansty	St. James
Arley	St. Wilfrid, Rectory Road
Arrow	The Holy Trinity
Ashow	The Assumption of our Lady
Astley	St. Mary the Virgin, Nuthurst Lane
Aston Cantlow	St. John Baptist
Atherstone	St. Mary, Market Square
Attleborough	Holy Trinity, Fifield Close
Baginton	St. John Baptist, Church Road
Barcheston	St. Martin
Barford	St. Peter, Church Street
Barton-on-the-Heath	St. Lawrence
Bearley	St. Mary the Virgin, Church Lane
Beaudesert	St. Nicholas
Bedworth	All Saint's
Berkswell	St. John Baptist, Church Lane
Bidford on Avon	St. Laurence, Church Street
Bilton	St. Mark, Church Walk
Binley	St. Bartholomew, Brinklow Road
Binton	St. Peter
Birdingbury	St. Leonard, Frankton Road
Bishop's Itchington	St. Michael
Bishops Tachbrook	St. Chad, Church Hill
Bourton	St. Peter
Brailes	St. George, High Street
Brinklow	St. John Baptist
Brownsover	Christ Church, Helvellyn Way
Bubbenhall	St. Giles
Budbrooke	St. Michael, Church Hill
Bulkington	St. James, School Road
Burmington	St. Barnabas and St. Nicholas
Burton Dassett	All Saints
Burton Hastings	St. Botolph
Butlers Marston	St. Peter and St. Paul
Caldecote	St. Theobald and St. Chad
Camp Hill	St. Mary and St. John
Canley	St. Stephen
Charlecote	St. Leonard
Cherington	St. John Baptist
Chesterton	St. Giles
Cheylesmore	Christ Church
Chilvers Coton	All Saints
Church Lawford	St. Peter
Churchover	The Holy Trinity
Claverdon	St. Michael and All Angels
Clifford Chambers	St. Helen
Clifton-upon-Dunsmore	St. Mary
Combroke	St. Mary and St. Margaret
Copston Magna	St. John
Corley	
Coughton	St. Peter
Coventry	St. Alban
Coventry	St. Anne and All Saints
Coventry	St. Margaret, Ball Hill
Coventry	St. Peter Hillfields
Coventry	Holy Trinity
Coventry	St. George
Coventry	St. John Baptist
Coventry	St. Mary Magdalen
Coventry	St. Michael (Cathedral)
Cubbington	St. Mary
Darlingscott	St. George
Dunchurch	St. Peter
Earlsdon	St. Barbara
Eastern Green	St. Andrew
Ettington	Holy Trinity and St. Thomas of Canterbury
Exhall	St. Giles
Farnborough	St. Botolph
Fenny Compton	St. Peter and St. Clare
Fillongley	St. Mary and All Saints
Finham	St. Martin in the Fields
Flecknoe	St. Mark
Fletchamstead	St. James
Foleshill	St. Laurence
Foleshill	St. Paul
Frankton	St. Nicholas
Gaydon with Chadshunt	St. Giles
Grandborough	St. Peter
Great Alne	St. Mary Magdalen
Halford	St. Mary
Hampton Lucy	St. Peter ad Vincula
Harborough Magna	All Saints
Harbury	Holy Trinity
Haselor	St. Mary and All Saints
Haseley	St. Mary
Hatton with Haseley	Holy Trinity
Henley-in-Arden	St. John the Baptist
Hillmorton	St. John the Baptist
Holbrooks	St. Luke
Honiley	St. John the Baptist
Honington	All Saints
Hunningham	St. Margaret
Idlicote	St. James the Great
Ilmington	St. Mary
Kenilworth	St. John
Kenilworth	St. Nicholas
Kenilworth	St. Barnabas
Keresley	St. Thomas
Kineton	St. Peter
Kinwarton	St. Mary the Virgin
Ladbroke	All Saints
Langley	St. Mary
Leamington	St. John Baptist
Leamington Hastings	All Saints
Leamington Priors	All Saints
Leamington Priors	St. Mary
Leamington Priors	St. Paul
Leamington Spa	Holy Trinity
Leamington Spa	St. Mark
Leek Wootton	All Saints
Lighthorne	St. Laurence
Lillington	St. Mary Magdalene
Long Compton	St. Peter and St. Paul
Long Itchington	Holy Trinity
Longford	St. Thomas
Long Lawford	St. John
Lower Shuckburgh	St. John the Baptist
Lowsonford	St. Luke
Loxley	St. Nicholas
Luddington	All Saints
Mancetter	St. Peter
Mappleborough Green	Holy Ascension
Marton	St. Esprit
Meriden & Great Packington	St. Laurence
Monks Kirby	St. Edith's
Moreton Morrell	Holy Cross
Morton Bagot	Holy Trinity
Napton on the Hill	St. Lawrence
New Arley	St. Michael
Newbold-on-Avon	St. Botolph
Newbold on Stour	St. David
Newbold Pacey	St. George
Newton	The Good Shepherd
North End	All Saints
Norton Lindsey	Holy Trinity
Nuneaton	St. Mary
Nuneaton	St. Nicolas
Offchurch	St. Gregory
Old Milverton	St. James
Oldberrow	St. Mary
Oxhill	St. Lawrence
Pailton	St. Denys
Pillerton Hersey with Pillerton Priors	St. Mary
Potters Green	St. Philip
Preston Bagot	All Saints
Preston-on-Stour	St. Mary
Princethorpe	St Cuthbert
Priors Hardwick	St. Mary
Priors Marston	St. Leonard
Radford (North)	St. Francis of Assisi
Radford Semele	St. Nicholas
Radford	St. Nicholas
Radway	St. Peter
Ratley	St. Peter ad Vincula
Rowington	St. Lawrence the Martyr
Rugby	St Matthew
Rugby	St Oswalds
Rugby	Overslade Church
Ryton on Dunsmore	St. Leonard
Salford Priors	St. Matthew
Sambourne	Mission Church
Sherbourne	All Saints
Shilton	St. Andrew
Shipston on Stour	St. Edmund
Shottery	St. Andrew
Shotteswell	St. Laurence
Snitterfield	St. James the Great
Southam	St. James
Spernall	St. Paul
Stockingford	St. Paul
Stockton	St. Michael
Stoneleigh	St. Mary
Stratford upon Avon	Holy Trinity
Stretton-on-Dunsmore	All Saints
Stretton on Fosse	St. Peter
Studley	Nativity of Blessed Virgin Mary
Styvechale	St. James
Sutton under Brailes	St. Thomas a Becket
Temple Grafton	St. Andrew
Thurlaston	St. Edmund
Tiddington	St. Peter
Tidmington	
Tile Hill	St. Oswald
Tredington	St. Gregory
Tysoe	Assumption of the Blessed Virgin Mary
Ufton	St. Michael and All Angels
Ullenhall	St. Mary the Virgin
Walsgrave on Sowe	St. Mary
Walton D'Eivile	St. James
Wappenbury	St. John Baptist
Warmington	St. Michael
Warwick	Christ Church
Warwick	All Saints
Warwick	Collegiate Church of St Mary
Warwick	St. Nicholas
Wasperton	St. John the Baptist
Weddington	St. James
Weethley Hamlet	St. James
Wellesbourne	St. Peter
Weston under Wetherley	St. Michael
Westwood	St. John the Baptist
Whatcote	St. Peter
Whichford	St. Michael
Whitchurch	St. Mary
Whitley	St. James
Whitnash	St. Margaret
Willenhall	St. John the Divine
Willey	St. Leonard
Willoughby	St. Nicholas
Withybrook	All Saints
Wixford	St. Milburga
Wolford	St. Michael
Wolston	St. Margaret
Wolverton	St. Mary the Virgin
Wolvey	St. John the Baptist
Wood End	St. Chad
Wootton Wawen	St. Peter
Wormleighton	St. Peter
Wyken	St. Mary Magdalene
Wyken Croft	Risen Christ
