= Barry Hammett =

Barry Keith Hammett, CB, QHC (born 9 October 1947) is a Church of England priest and former Royal Navy chaplain. He was Chaplain of the Fleet, Director General of the Naval Chaplaincy Service and Archdeacon for the Royal Navy from 2002 to 2006.

== Early life and education ==
Hammett was born on 9 October 1947. He was educated at Eltham College, then a direct grant grammar school in London. He studied at Magdalen College, Oxford, graduating with a Bachelor of Arts (BA) degree in 1971. He then trained for holy orders at St Stephen's House, Oxford, between 1971 and 1974. He additionally spent time as an exchange student at the Venerable English College, a Roman Catholic seminary in Rome, Italy.

== Ordained ministry ==
Hammett was ordained in the Church of England as a deacon in 1974 and as a priest in 1975. He served his curacy at St Peter's Church, Plymouth in the Diocese of Exeter.

He served as a chaplain in the Royal Navy from 1977 to 2006. He worked as a staff chaplain at the Ministry of Defence from 1986 to 1990, and principal of the Armed Forces' Chaplaincy Centre from 1996 to 2000. He was an Honorary Chaplain to the Queen (QHC) from 1999 to 2006. From 2002 to 2006, he served as Chaplain of the Fleet and director general of the Royal Navy Chaplaincy Service. As the most senior Anglican chaplain in the Navy, he also served as Archdeacon for the Royal Navy in the Church of England. In the 2006 New Year Honours, he was appointed Companion of the Order of the Bath (CB).

He retired from the Royal Navy in 2006, and then held permission to officiate in the Diocese of Portsmouth from 2007 to 2015. Since 2015, he has held permission to officiate in the Diocese of Oxford.
