= Oxhill, Warwickshire =

Village in Warwickshire, England

Coordinates: 52.11053°N 1.53999°W

Oxhill
- Village
- Main Street

- Church of St Lawrence

- Location within Warwickshire
- Population: 387 (2021)
- OS grid reference: SP3145
- Shire county: Warwickshire
- Region: West Midlands
- Country: England
- Sovereign state: United Kingdom
- Post town: Warwick
- Postcode district: CV35
- Dialling code: 01295
- Police: Warwickshire
- Fire: Warwickshire
- Ambulance: West Midlands
- UK Parliament: Stratford-on-Avon

Oxhill is a village in South Warwickshire, England, off the A422 road between Stratford-upon-Avon and Banbury. The population taken at the 2021census was 387. It lies in the administrative district of Stratford-on-Avon in the area known as the Vale of the Red Horse. The village is mentioned in the Domesday Book as "Octeselve" and has a 12th-century church dedicated to Saint Lawrence. The indentions in the chancel window mullions are believed by many to be the marks made by local archers sharpening their arrowheads. Because of the holiness and sacredness of the church, the blessed arrows were also presumed to have divine accuracy.

== Myrtilla's Tomb ==
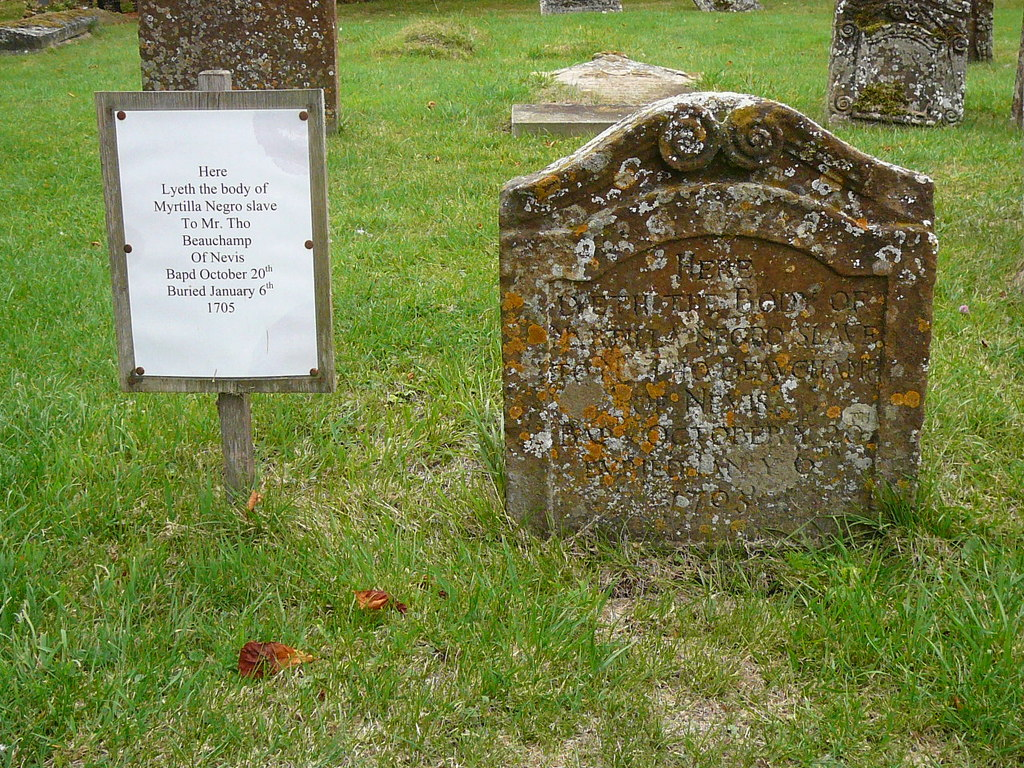
Headstone dedicated to Myrtilla

In the graveyard of St Lawrence's Church there is the grave of Myrtilla, with a headstone dated 1706 (1705, in accordance with the Old Style or Julian calendar). It is one of the earliest known graves in England commemorating a person of African descent. The inscription reads:

Here lyeth the body of Myrtilla, negro slave to Mr. Thos Beauchamp of Nevis. Bapt. Oct. ye 20th. Buried Jan ye 6th, 1705.

The headstone identifies Myrtilla as being enslaved by Thomas Beauchamp, whilst in the church register, she is described as 'a negro girl of Mrs Beauchamp's'. Thomas Beauchamp is believed to be a sugar planter from Nevis, who was married to Perletta Meese, a daughter of the Rector of Oxhill, Nicholas Meese. The gravestone is a simple version of the local style, located on the south-east side of the church, and is Grade II* listed.
