= John Green (priest) =

British priest and Royal Navy chaplain

The Venerable John Green CB QHC DL
- Chaplain of the Fleet
- Church: Church of England
- In office: March 2006 – October 2010
- Predecessor: Barry Hammett
- Successor: Scott Brown
- Other posts: Archdeacon Pastor, Diocese of Coventry (2012–2017); Archdeacon for the Royal Navy (2006–2010)

Orders
- Ordination: 1983

Personal details
- Born: 14 August 1953 (age 73)
- Denomination: Anglicanism
- Education: North East London Polytechnic
- Military career
- Allegiance: United Kingdom
- Branch: Royal Navy
- Service years: 1991–2010
- Unit: Royal Navy Chaplaincy Service
- Commands: Director General of the Royal Navy Chaplaincy Service
- Awards: Companion of the Order of the Bath

John Green, CB, QHC, DL (born 14 August 1953) is a Church of England priest and former Royal Navy chaplain. He was Chaplain of the Fleet, Director General of the Naval Chaplaincy Service and Archdeacon for the Royal Navy from 2006 to 2010. He was Archdeacon Pastor in the Diocese of Coventry from 2012 until his retirement in 2017.

He was born on 14 August 1953 and educated at North East London Polytechnic. From 1974 to 1980 he was a Project Engineer with Thorn Lighting Ltd. He was ordained in 1983 after studying at Lincoln Theological College and began his ecclesiastical career with curacies at St Michael and All Angels, Watford and St Stephen's Church, St Albans.

He became a naval chaplain in 1991: his service included

- HMS Sultan, 1991–1992
- 3rd Destroyer Sqdn, 1992–1993
- HMNB Portsmouth, 1993–1994
- HMS Excellent, 1994–1995
- Minor Warfare Vessel Flotilla, 1996–1998
- Staff Chaplain to Chaplain of the Fleet, 1998–2001
- HMS Ark Royal, 2001–2003
- HMS Collingwood, 2003–2006
- Chaplain of the Fleet and Director General, Naval Chaplaincy Service 2006–2010

He headed the Naval Chaplaincy Service Board of Management with responsibility for policy making and overall leadership. As Archdeacon for the Royal Navy he was the senior Anglican chaplain in the Royal Navy.

Green was appointed Companion of the Order of the Bath (CB) in the 2010 New Year Honours.

In September 2013, Green became Associate Minister at St Mary Magdalen, Chapelfields, in the Diocese of Coventry, a post which he relinquished on his retirement in 2017.

In 2019, Green moved to the northwest Highlands of Scotland, near the village of Drumbeg, and holds permission to officiate in the united diocese of Moray, Ross and Caithness in the Scottish Episcopal Church. He was appointed a Deputy Lieutenant of Sutherland in March 2025.

== Footnotes ==
Church of England titles
Preceded by Barry Hammett	Chaplain of the Fleet; 2006 –2010	Succeeded by Scott Brown
