= Bishop of Warwick =

Anglican suffragan bishop in England

The Bishop of Warwick is an episcopal title used by a suffragan bishop of the Church of England Diocese of Coventry, in the Province of Canterbury, England. The title takes its name after Warwick, the county town of Warwickshire; the See was erected under the Suffragans Nomination Act 1888 by Order in Council dated 19 December 1979.

The see is presently vacant following the retirement of the most recent bishop, John Stroyan in 2023.

== List of bishops ==
Bishops of Warwick
From	Until	Incumbent	Notes
1980	1990	Keith Arnold	(1926–2021)
1990	1996	Clive Handford	(b. 1937) Translated to Cyprus and the Gulf
1996	2005	Anthony Priddis	(b. 1948) Translated to Hereford
2005	2023	John Stroyan	(b. 1955) Retired 7 August 2023.
