= Fletchamstead =

Area of Coventry, West Midlands, England

Coordinates: 52.4°N 1.56°W

Fletchamstead is an area of Coventry. It is located adjacent to the Birmingham railway about 2 miles SW of Coventry and has a church, a pub and a business park.
