= Burmington =

Village in Warwickshire, England

Coordinates: 52.039°N 1.614°W

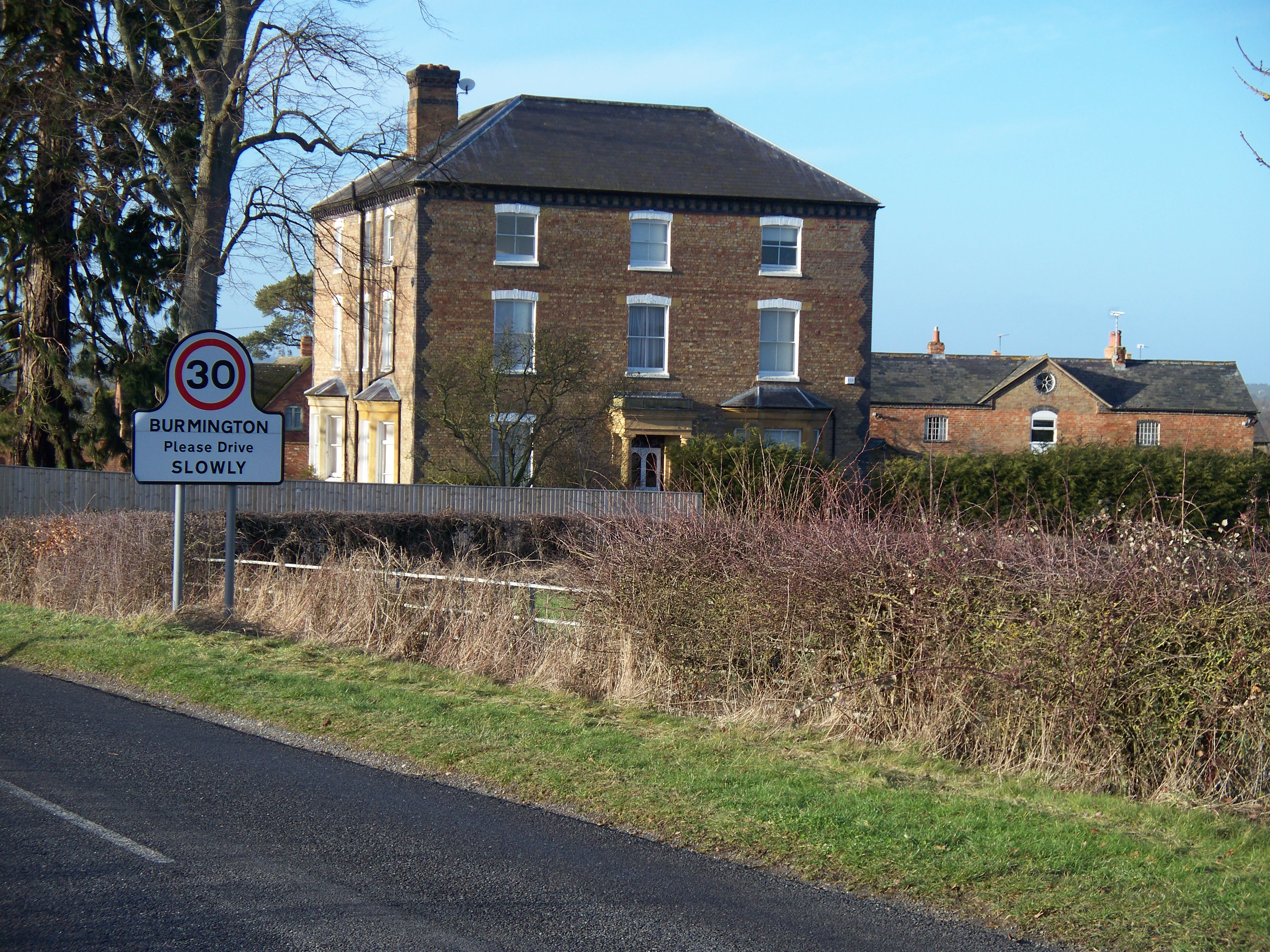

- Location within Warwickshire
- Population: 164
- OS grid reference: SP264379
- Civil parish: Burmington
- District: Stratford-on-Avon
- Shire county: Warwickshire
- Region: West Midlands
- Country: England
- Sovereign state: United Kingdom
- Post town: SHIPSTON-ON-STOUR
- Postcode district: CV36
- Dialling code: 01608
- Police: Warwickshire
- Fire: Warwickshire
- Ambulance: West Midlands
- UK Parliament: Stratford-on-Avon

Burmington is a village and civil parish in Warwickshire, England. It is 2 miles (3 km) south of Shipston-on-Stour. The population at the 2001 Census was 127, increasing to 164 at the 2011 Census.
