= Orbit Group =

Orbit Group is a housing group providing affordable housing to around 47,000 households in England, mainly in the Midlands, East Anglia and the south east, operating out of 7 offices with its head office in Coventry.

The group manages a portfolio of homes for over 100,000 customers in differing stages of life, from first timers to enhanced supported living, and is one of the largest builders of affordable homes in the UK.

Orbit Group is a not-for-profit organisation that is socially driven and commercially minded and is committed to creating a better society, building affordable homes and communities, and to do so in more socially responsible and sustainable ways.

== History ==
Orbit Housing Association was established in 1967. In 1998 the company established Orbit Bexley Housing Association to take on the management of the 4,500 transferred from the London Borough of Bexley, under a process known as large scale voluntary transfer (LSVT). Thanet Community Housing Association joined the group in 2004 and brought with it stock in east Kent. In October 2007 Orbit Bexley and Thanet Community were merged to form Orbit South.

Orbit is active in promoting shared ownership as well as providing homes for affordable rent. In 2010, Orbit helped 117 families through the Government's 'Mortgage Rescue' scheme, more than any other association.

In 2009 Orbit Homes, the development and sales arm of the Orbit Group was formed. Orbit Homes build in excess of 1,000 new homes per year across a range of tenures including Shared Ownership and Outright Sale throughout the Midlands, East and South East of England

From 2012 to 2021, Baroness Tessa Blackstone sat on the board of Orbit Group as its future chair.

Orbit Group appointed Phil Andrew, the former CEO of StepChange, as its new CEO in July 2023.

In May 2024, Orbit Group announced a 2030 strategy aimed at prioritising customer experience and building 5,700 new build homes.

== Leadership ==
- Chief Executive Officer; Phil Andrew
- Group Finance Director; Jonathan Wallbank
- Group Director of People and Reputation; John Wrighthouse
- Group Director of Orbit Homes; Helen Moore
- Group Director of Corporate Services; Afzal Ismail
- Group Board Chair; David Weaver
