= List of United Kingdom locations: Dr =

The United Kingdom

This is part of the list of United Kingdom locations: a gazetteer of place names in the United Kingdom showing each place's locality and geographical coordinates.

== Dr ==
=== Dra ===
Location	Locality	Coordinates (links to map & photo sources)	OS grid reference
Drabblegate	Norfolk	52.80°N 01.26°E	TG2028
Draethen	Caerphilly	51.57°N 03.12°W	ST2287
Draffan	South Lanarkshire	55.68°N 03.92°W	NS7945
Dragley Beck	Cumbria	54.18°N 03.08°W	SD2977
Dragonby	North Lincolnshire	53.61°N 00.64°W	SE9014
Dragon's Green	West Sussex	50.99°N 00.37°W	TQ1423
Dragon's Hill	Dorset	50.73°N 02.93°W	SY3493
Drakehouse	Sheffield	53.35°N 01.35°W	SK4384
Drakeland Corner	Devon	50.40°N 04.01°W	SX5758
Drakelow	Derbyshire	52.774°N 01.636°W	SK246196
Drakelow	Worcestershire	52.41°N 02.26°W	SO8280
Drakemyre	Aberdeenshire	57.44°N 02.06°W	NJ9639
Drakemyre	North Ayrshire	55.71°N 04.72°W	NS2950
Drakes Broughton	Worcestershire	52.13°N 02.11°W	SO9248
Drakes Cross	Worcestershire	52.38°N 01.88°W	SP0876
Drakestone Green	Suffolk	52.06°N 00.90°E	TL9945
Drakewalls	Cornwall	50.50°N 04.22°W	SX4270
Draughton	Northamptonshire	52.37°N 00.88°W	SP7676
Draughton	North Yorkshire	53.96°N 01.95°W	SE0352
Drawbridge	Cornwall	50.45°N 04.59°W	SX1665
Drax	North Yorkshire	53.72°N 00.98°W	SE6726
Draycot	Oxfordshire	51.74°N 01.07°W	SP6405
Draycot Cerne	Wiltshire	51.50°N 02.11°W	ST9278
Draycote	Warwickshire	52.32°N 01.35°W	SP4470
Draycot Fitz Payne	Wiltshire	51.35°N 01.80°W	SU1462
Draycot Foliat	Swindon	51.49°N 01.74°W	SU1877
Draycott	Derbyshire	52.89°N 01.34°W	SK4433
Draycott (Cam)	Gloucestershire	51.71°N 02.37°W	SO7402
Draycott (Blockley)	Gloucestershire	52.01°N 01.73°W	SP1835
Draycott	Shropshire	52.52°N 02.28°W	SO8192
Draycott (Rodney Stoke)	Somerset	51.24°N 02.76°W	ST4750
Draycott (Limington)	Somerset	50.98°N 02.65°W	ST5421
Draycott	Worcestershire	52.12°N 02.22°W	SO8547
Draycott in the Clay	Staffordshire	52.84°N 01.77°W	SK1528
Draycott in the Moors	Staffordshire	52.95°N 02.03°W	SJ9840
Drayford	Devon	50.90°N 03.73°W	SS7813
Drayton	Leicestershire	52.51°N 00.77°W	SP8392
Drayton	Lincolnshire	52.93°N 00.15°W	TF2439
Drayton	Norfolk	52.67°N 01.22°E	TG1813
Drayton	Northamptonshire	52.25°N 01.18°W	SP5662
Drayton (Cherwell)	Oxfordshire	52.06°N 01.38°W	SP4241
Drayton (Vale of White Horse)	Oxfordshire	51.64°N 01.32°W	SU4794
Drayton	City of Portsmouth	50.84°N 01.04°W	SU6705
Drayton (Langport)	Somerset	51.01°N 02.85°W	ST4024
Drayton (South Petherton)	Somerset	50.93°N 02.78°W	ST4515
Drayton	Warwickshire	52.19°N 01.76°W	SP1655
Drayton	Worcestershire	52.37°N 02.14°W	SO9075
Drayton Bassett	Staffordshire	52.59°N 01.72°W	SK1900
Drayton Beauchamp	Buckinghamshire	51.79°N 00.69°W	SP9012
Drayton Parslow	Buckinghamshire	51.94°N 00.79°W	SP8328
Drayton St Leonard	Oxfordshire	51.65°N 01.14°W	SU5996

=== Dre ===
Location	Locality	Coordinates (links to map & photo sources)	OS grid reference
Drebley	North Yorkshire	54.02°N 01.92°W	SE0559
Dreemskerry	Isle of Man	54.29°N 04.35°W	SC4791
Dreenhill	Pembrokeshire	51.78°N 05.01°W	SM9214
Drefach	Ceredigion	52.08°N 04.19°W	SN5045
Drefach (Dre-fach Felindre, Llangeler)	Carmarthenshire	52.01°N 04.40°W	SN3538
Drefach (Meidrim)	Carmarthenshire	51.85°N 04.48°W	SN2920
Drefach (Gorslas)	Carmarthenshire	51.79°N 04.14°W	SN5213
Dre-fach (Cyngor Bro Dyffryn)	Carmarthenshire	51.82°N 03.96°W	SN6516
Dreggie	Highland	57.33°N 03.62°W	NJ0228
Dreghorn	North Ayrshire	55.60°N 04.62°W	NS3538
Dreghorn	City of Edinburgh	55.89°N 03.24°W	NT2268
Dre-gôch	Denbighshire	53.20°N 03.34°W	SJ1068
Drellingore	Kent	51.12°N 01.20°E	TR2441
Drem	East Lothian	56.00°N 02.80°W	NT5079
Dresden	City of Stoke-on-Trent	52.97°N 02.15°W	SJ9042
Dreumasdal	Western Isles	57.30°N 07.38°W	NF7637
Drewsteignton	Devon	50.70°N 03.80°W	SX7391
Drewton	East Riding of Yorkshire	53.78°N 00.61°W	SE9132

=== Dri ===
Location	Locality	Coordinates (links to map & photo sources)	OS grid reference
Driby	Lincolnshire	53.24°N 00.06°E	TF3874
Driffield	East Riding of Yorkshire	54.00°N 00.44°W	TA0258
Driffield	Gloucestershire	51.68°N 01.90°W	SU0799
Drift	Cornwall	50.09°N 05.59°W	SW4328
Drigg	Cumbria	54.36°N 03.44°W	SD0698
Drighlington	Leeds	53.755°N 01.66°W	SE2228
Drimnagall	Argyll and Bute	55.99°N 05.67°W	NR7184
Drimnin	Highland	56.61°N 05.99°W	NM5554
Drimpton	Dorset	50.84°N 02.83°W	ST4105
Dringhoe	East Riding of Yorkshire	53.96°N 00.24°W	TA1554
Dringhouses	York	53.93°N 01.11°W	SE5849
Drinisiadar	Western Isles	57.84°N 06.77°W	NG1794
Drinkstone	Suffolk	52.21°N 00.85°E	TL9561
Drinkstone Green	Suffolk	52.20°N 00.86°E	TL9660
Drive End	Dorset	50.86°N 02.61°W	ST5707
Driver's End	Hertfordshire	51.85°N 00.22°W	TL2219

=== Dro ===
Location	Locality	Coordinates (links to map & photo sources)	OS grid reference
Drointon	Staffordshire	52.83°N 01.97°W	SK0226
Droitwich Spa	Worcestershire	52.26°N 02.16°W	SO8963
Droman	Highland	58.48°N 05.12°W	NC1859
Dron	Perth and Kinross	56.32°N 03.39°W	NO1415
Dronfield	Derbyshire	53.29°N 01.47°W	SK3578
Dronfield Woodhouse	Derbyshire	53.29°N 01.50°W	SK3378
Drongan	East Ayrshire	55.43°N 04.46°W	NS4418
Dronley	Angus	56.50°N 03.07°W	NO3435
Droop	Dorset	50.87°N 02.35°W	ST7508
Drope	The Vale of Glamorgan	51.46°N 03.28°W	ST1175
Dropping Well	Rotherham	53.44°N 01.41°W	SK3994
Droxford	Hampshire	50.95°N 01.14°W	SU6018
Droylsden	Manchester	53.47°N 02.16°W	SJ8998

=== Dru ===
Location	Locality	Coordinates (links to map & photo sources)	OS grid reference
Drub	Kirklees	53.73°N 01.71°W	SE1926
Druggers End	Worcestershire	52.04°N 02.30°W	SO7938
Druid	Denbighshire	52.97°N 03.43°W	SJ0443
Druidston	Pembrokeshire	51.80°N 05.10°W	SM8616
Druimarbin	Highland	56.79°N 05.14°W	NN0871
Druimindarroch	Highland	56.89°N 05.79°W	NM6984
Drum	Perth and Kinross	56.18°N 03.54°W	NO0400
Drum	City of Edinburgh	55.90°N 03.12°W	NT3068
Drumadoon Point	North Ayrshire	55.50°N 05.34°W	NR889289
Drumbeg	Highland	58.23°N 05.20°W	NC1232
Drumblade	Aberdeenshire	57.44°N 02.70°W	NJ5840
Drumbuie	Highland	57.31°N 05.70°W	NG7731
Drumburgh	Cumbria	54.92°N 03.15°W	NY2659
Drumchapel	City of Glasgow	55.90°N 04.36°W	NS5270
Drumchork	Highland	57.83°N 05.58°W	NG8788
Drumclog	South Lanarkshire	55.61°N 04.17°W	NS6338
Drumdollo	Aberdeenshire	57.43°N 02.68°W	NJ5938
Drumeldrie	Fife	56.21°N 02.90°W	NO4403
Drumelzier	Scottish Borders	55.59°N 03.38°W	NT1334
Drumfearn	Highland	57.16°N 05.85°W	NG6715
Drumgelloch	North Lanarkshire	55.86°N 03.96°W	NS7765
Drumgley	Angus	56.63°N 02.94°W	NO4250
Drumguish	Highland	57.06°N 03.99°W	NN7999
Drumlemble	Argyll and Bute	55.40°N 05.69°W	NR6619
Drumlithie	Aberdeenshire	56.91°N 02.36°W	NO7880
Drummersdale	Lancashire	53.61°N 02.92°W	SD3913
Drummond (Dingwall)	Highland	57.65°N 04.34°W	NH6065
Drummond (Inverness)	Highland	57.45°N 04.23°W	NH6643
Drummore	Dumfries and Galloway	54.68°N 04.90°W	NX1336
Drummuie	Highland	57.96°N 04.01°W	NH8199
Drummuir	Moray	57.48°N 03.03°W	NJ3844
Drummygar	Angus	56.57°N 02.73°W	NO5543
Drumnadrochit	Highland	57.33°N 04.49°W	NH5030
Drumnagorrach	Moray	57.55°N 02.80°W	NJ5252
Drumoak	Aberdeenshire	57.07°N 02.36°W	NO7898
Drumpellier	North Lanarkshire	55.86°N 04.06°W	NS7165
Drumry	West Dunbartonshire	55.90°N 04.40°W	NS5070
Drumsleet	Dumfries and Galloway	55.04°N 03.66°W	NX9474
Drumsmittal	Highland	57.51°N 04.27°W	NH6449
Drumsturdy	Angus	56.50°N 02.84°W	NO4835
Drumuie	Highland	57.43°N 06.25°W	NG4546
Drumuillie	Highland	57.25°N 03.75°W	NH9420
Drumvaich	Stirling	56.21°N 04.14°W	NN6704
Drury	Flintshire	53.16°N 03.06°W	SJ2964
Drury Lane	Wrexham	52.97°N 02.80°W	SJ4642
Drurylane	Norfolk	52.57°N 00.86°E	TF9401
Drury Square	Norfolk	52.69°N 00.81°E	TF9015

=== Dry ===
Location	Locality	Coordinates (links to map & photo sources)	OS grid reference
Drybeck	Cumbria	54.52°N 02.52°W	NY6615
Drybridge	Moray	57.64°N 02.95°W	NJ4362
Drybridge	North Ayrshire	55.59°N 04.62°W	NS3536
Drybrook	Gloucestershire	51.85°N 02.52°W	SO6417
Dryburgh	Scottish Borders	55.57°N 02.65°W	NT5931
Dryden	Scottish Borders	55.49°N 02.84°W	NT4723
Dry Doddington	Lincolnshire	53.00°N 00.73°W	SK8546
Dry Drayton	Cambridgeshire	52.23°N 00.01°E	TL3862
Dry Hill	Hampshire	51.11°N 01.07°W	SU6536
Dryhill	Kent	51.27°N 00.13°E	TQ4955
Dryhope	Scottish Borders	55.50°N 03.17°W	NT2624
Drylaw	City of Edinburgh	55.96°N 03.26°W	NT2175
Drym	Cornwall	50.14°N 05.33°W	SW6233
Drymen	Stirling	56.06°N 04.45°W	NS4788
Drymere	Norfolk	52.62°N 00.62°E	TF7806
Drymuir	Aberdeenshire	57.49°N 02.15°W	NJ9145
Drynham	Wiltshire	51.30°N 02.20°W	ST8656
Drynie Park	Highland	57.52°N 04.42°W	NH5551
Drynoch	Highland	57.29°N 06.31°W	NG4031
Dry Sandford	Oxfordshire	51.69°N 01.33°W	SP4600
Dryslwyn	Carmarthenshire	51.85°N 04.10°W	SN5520
Dry Street	Essex	51.54°N 00.43°E	TQ6986
Dryton	Shropshire	52.65°N 02.62°W	SJ5806
