= Draycott =

Draycott, Draycot or Draycote may refer to:

== Places in England ==
- Draycott, Derbyshire
- Draycott, Gloucestershire
- Draycott, Stroud, a location
- Draycot Moor or Draycott Moor, a former civil parish in Berkshire, now in Oxfordshire
- Draycot, Oxfordshire, a hamlet on the River Thame in Tiddington-with-Albury civil parish, Oxfordshire
- Draycott, Shropshire, a location
- Draycott, Somerset
  - Draycott Sleights, an SSSI
  - Draycott railway station (Somerset), a former station
- Draycott, South Somerset, a hamlet in Limington parish, Somerset
- Draycott in the Clay, Staffordshire
- Draycott in the Moors, Staffordshire
- Draycote, Warwickshire
  - Draycote Water
- Draycot Cerne, Wiltshire
- Draycot Foliat, Wiltshire
- Draycott, Worcestershire

== People ==
- Draycott (surname)

== See also ==
- Draycot, Oxfordshire, a hamlet in the parish of Tiddington-with-Albury, Oxfordshire
- Drayton (disambiguation)
