= Drayton =

Drayton may refer to:

== People ==
- Drayton (surname)

== Legal cases ==
- United States v. Drayton, 536 U.S. 194 (2002)

== Places ==
=== Australia ===
- Drayton, Queensland, a locality in the Toowoomba Region
- Shire of Drayton, a former local government area in Queensland

=== Canada ===
- Drayton, Ontario

=== United Kingdom ===
- Drayton, Hampshire, a close suburb of Portsmouth
- Drayton, Leicestershire
- Drayton, Norfolk, a satellite village of Norwich
- Drayton, Northamptonshire, a suburb of Daventry
- Drayton, Cherwell, Oxfordshire, a satellite village of Banbury
- Drayton, Vale of White Horse, Oxfordshire, a satellite village of Abingdon
- Drayton St. Leonard, Oxfordshire, locally abbreviated sometimes to Drayton
- Drayton, Somerset
- Drayton Beauchamp, Buckinghamshire
- Drayton, a former hamlet, later known as Drayton Green, now part of West Ealing, Greater London
  - Drayton Green railway station
  - Drayton Manor High School
- Drayton, the south-east of the parish of Swineshead, Lincolnshire
- Drayton, a reduced, much renamed and subdivided estate of Barton Stacey, north-west Hampshire
- Drayton, a reduced, partly renamed and subdivided estate of South Petherton, Somerset
- Drayton, Worcestershire, a largely subdivided estate of Chaddesley Corbett, Worcestershire

=== United States ===
- Drayton, Georgia
- Drayton, North Dakota
- Drayton, South Carolina, an unincorporated community
- Drayton Hall, South Carolina
- Drayton Plains, Michigan

== Other place names ==
=== United Kingdom ===
- Drayton Bassett, Staffordshire
- Drayton Beauchamp, Buckinghamshire
- Drayton House, Northamptonshire
- Drayton Manor, Staffordshire
  - Drayton Manor Theme Park, Staffordshire
- Drayton Park railway station, Greater London
- Drayton Parslow, Buckinghamshire
- East Drayton, Nottinghamshire
- Fenny Drayton, Leicestershire
- Market Drayton, Shropshire
- West Drayton, Greater London
- West Drayton, Nottinghamshire

== See also ==
- Draycott (disambiguation)
