= Drawbridge (disambiguation) =

A drawbridge is a type of moveable bridge. In American English, drawbridge can also refer to moveable bridges in general.

Drawbridge may also refer to:

== People ==
- John Drawbridge, a 20th-century New Zealand artist

== Geography ==
- Drawbridge, California, a ghost town in the USA
- Drawbridge, Cornwall, a hamlet in England
- Drawbridge Peak, a mountain in Alberta, Canada
- Kuala Terengganu Drawbridge, a bridge in Terengganu, Malaysia

== Other uses ==
- Drawbridge (company), based in California, US
- The Drawbridge, a quarterly newspaper in London
- Drawbridge in Nieuw-Amsterdam, a painting (1883) by Vincent Van Gogh.
- Drawbridge mentality, a term describing a selfish mentality.
