= Jim Yardley (cricketer) =

English cricketer

Personal information
- Full name: Thomas James Yardley
- Born: 27 October 1946; Chaddesley Corbett, Worcestershire, England
- Died: 20 November 2010 (aged 64); Canada
- Batting: Left-handed
- Bowling: Right arm medium
- Role: Batsman, occasional wicket-keeper

Domestic team information
- Years: Team
- 1967–1975: Worcestershire
- 1976–1982: Northamptonshire
- First-class debut: 9 August 1967 Worcestershire v Nottinghamshire
- Last First-class: 21 May 1982 Northamptonshire v Surrey
- List A debut: 29 June 1969 Worcestershire v Yorkshire
- Last List A: 13 June 1982 Northamptonshire v Kent

Career statistics
Competition	First-class	List A
Matches	260	239
Runs scored	8287	3166
Batting average	25.81	19.42
100s/50s	5/40	0/12
Top score	135	75*
Balls bowled	48	7
Wickets	0	0
Bowling average	–	–
5 wickets in innings	0	0
10 wickets in match	0	n/a
Best bowling	0/3	0/3
Catches/stumpings	232/2	82/2
- Source: CricketArchive, 30 September 2008

Thomas James Yardley (27 October 1946 – 20 November 2010) was an English first-class cricketer. He was a left-handed batsman, an occasional wicket-keeper and an even more occasional right-arm medium pace bowler (he bowled only eight overs in first-class cricket). He played for Worcestershire and Northamptonshire between 1967 and 1982.
