= Harvington Hall =

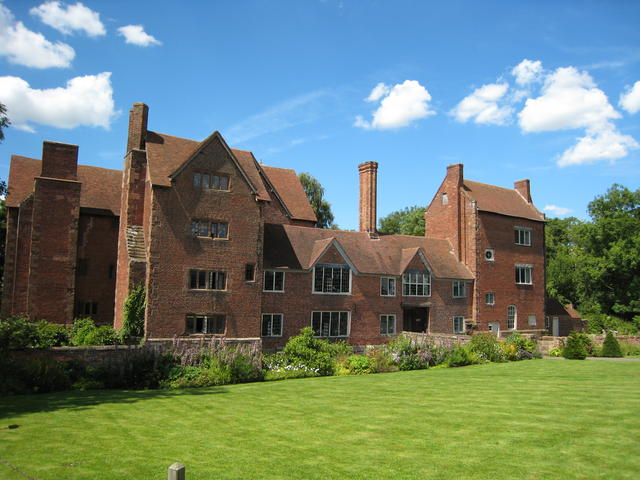

- Location in England

General information
- Type: stately home
- Location: Chaddesley Corbett, Worcestershire, England
- Coordinates: 52°22′04″N 2°10′51″W
- Owner: Roman Catholic Archdiocese of Birmingham

Website
- www.harvingtonhall.com

Harvington Hall is a moated medieval and Elizabethan manor house in the hamlet of Harvington in the civil parish of Chaddesley Corbett, southeast of Kidderminster in the English county of Worcestershire.

It is open to the public.

== History ==
Harvington's moat and artificial island can be traced back to the 13th century, older than the bulk of the 14th-century building work that survives behind a layer of bricks. The Hall's centre block was probably the “solar” of a typical H-shaped timber-framed building.

Adam de Harvington (Herwynton), Chancellor of the Exchequer, lived and, probably, died there in March 1344. After his death, the estate was passed into the hands of the 11th Earl of Warwick and, in 1529, was sold to a wealthy lawyer, Sir John Pakington.

Sir John Pakington's great-nephew, Humphrey Pakington, inherited the estate in 1578, who transformed this manor with the features that are most notable today.

Though the Hall's scale is large in the present day, it is currently only about half of its original size as two additional wings were demolished in around 1700.

Humphrey was a Catholic during the time of the harsh Elizabethan penal laws against Catholicism in England. Humphrey was a recusant, which means that he refused to abide by the practices of the Church of England, such as attending the church service on Sundays, a refusal that was extremely costly financially.

In 1585, it became illegal for a Catholic priest to set foot in England, which prompted Humphrey to construct numerous priest holes (or "priest hides") in the Hall for the protection of Catholic priests or followers. These priest holes have remained till today. Most notably, some of them were the handiwork of the master carpenter Nicholas Owen, a Jesuit lay brother.

Humphrey died in 1631 and left the Hall to his wife, Abigail, as the dower house. When Abigail died in 1657, she left the Hall to her daughter, Lady Mary Yate, who died in the Hall in 1696 at the age of 85, outliving her son and grandson. The Hall was inherited by her granddaughter, another Mary Yate. Mary was married to Sir Robert Throckmorton of Coughton Court in Warwickshire, the son of Sir Francis Throckmorton. Sir Robert had little use for Harvington Hall and demolished two wings.

In the 19th and early 20th centuries, most of the furnishings were stripped, leaving Harvington in a bare and dilapidated state. One oak staircase was taken for reuse at Coughton Court.

In 1923, Mrs Ellen Grant Ferris (1870–1955) purchased and gave Harvington Hall to the Archdiocese of Birmingham. Ferris was the mother of Robert Grant Ferris, who was Deputy Speaker of the House of Commons from 1970 to 1974 and later became Lord Harvington.

In 1958 Harvington Hall, and its attached east bridge, was Grade I listed. In 2001 a moatside garden was replanted, including medicinal herbs mentioned in Elizabethan letters from John Halsey to Elizabeth Pakington at Little Malvern Court in Worcestershire.

== See also ==
- Father Wall
