= River Garnock =

River in south-west Scotland

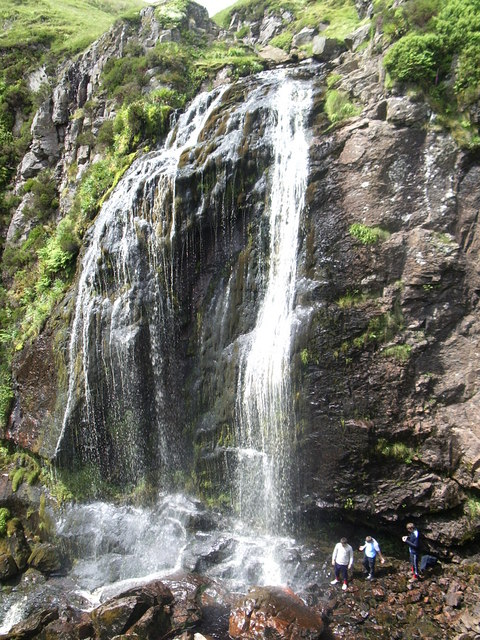
- "The Spout"
- Native name: Abhainn Ghairneig (Scottish Gaelic)

Location
- Country: Scotland
- Region: North Ayrshire

Physical characteristics
- Source
  - location: Hill of Stake, Ayrshire, Scotland
  - elevation: 522 m (1,713 ft)
- Mouth
  - location: Firth of Clyde, Irvine
- Length: 39 km (24 mi)

The River Garnock (Scottish Gaelic: Gairneag / Abhainn Ghairneig), the smallest of Ayrshire's six principal rivers, has its source on the southern side of the Hill of Stake in the heart of the Clyde Muirshiel Regional Park. About one and a half miles (2.4 km) south of this starting point the stream tumbles over the Spout of Garnock, the highest waterfall in Ayrshire, once thought to be the river's origin. The river then continues, for a total length of around 20 miles (32 km), through the towns of Kilbirnie, Glengarnock, Dalry and Kilwinning to its confluence with the River Irvine at Irvine Harbour.

The main tributaries are the Rye Water and Caaf Water, which join north and south of Dalry respectively, and the Lugton Water, which joins just south of Kilwinning.

== Garnock Valley ==
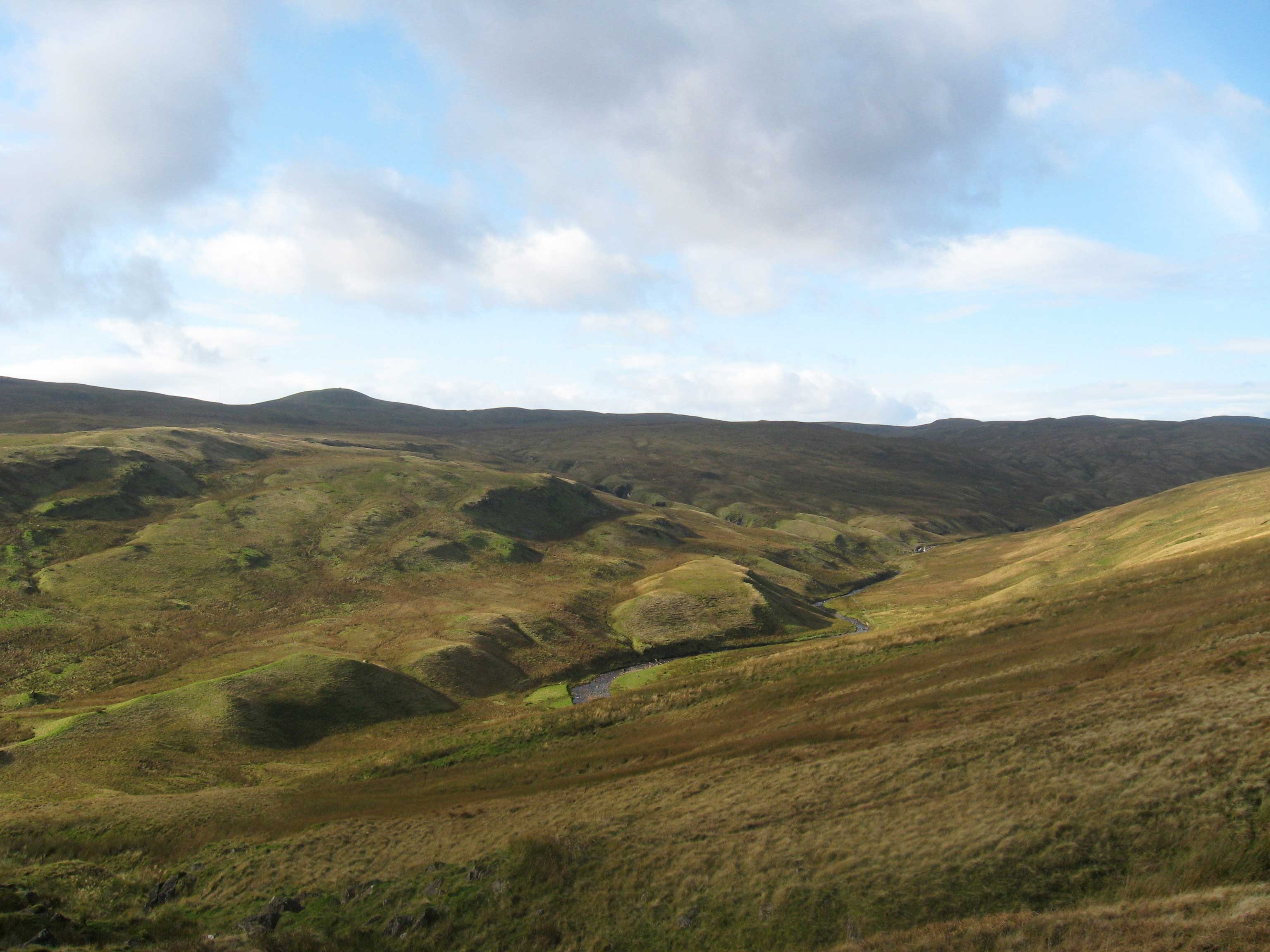
The river upstream from Glen Garnock

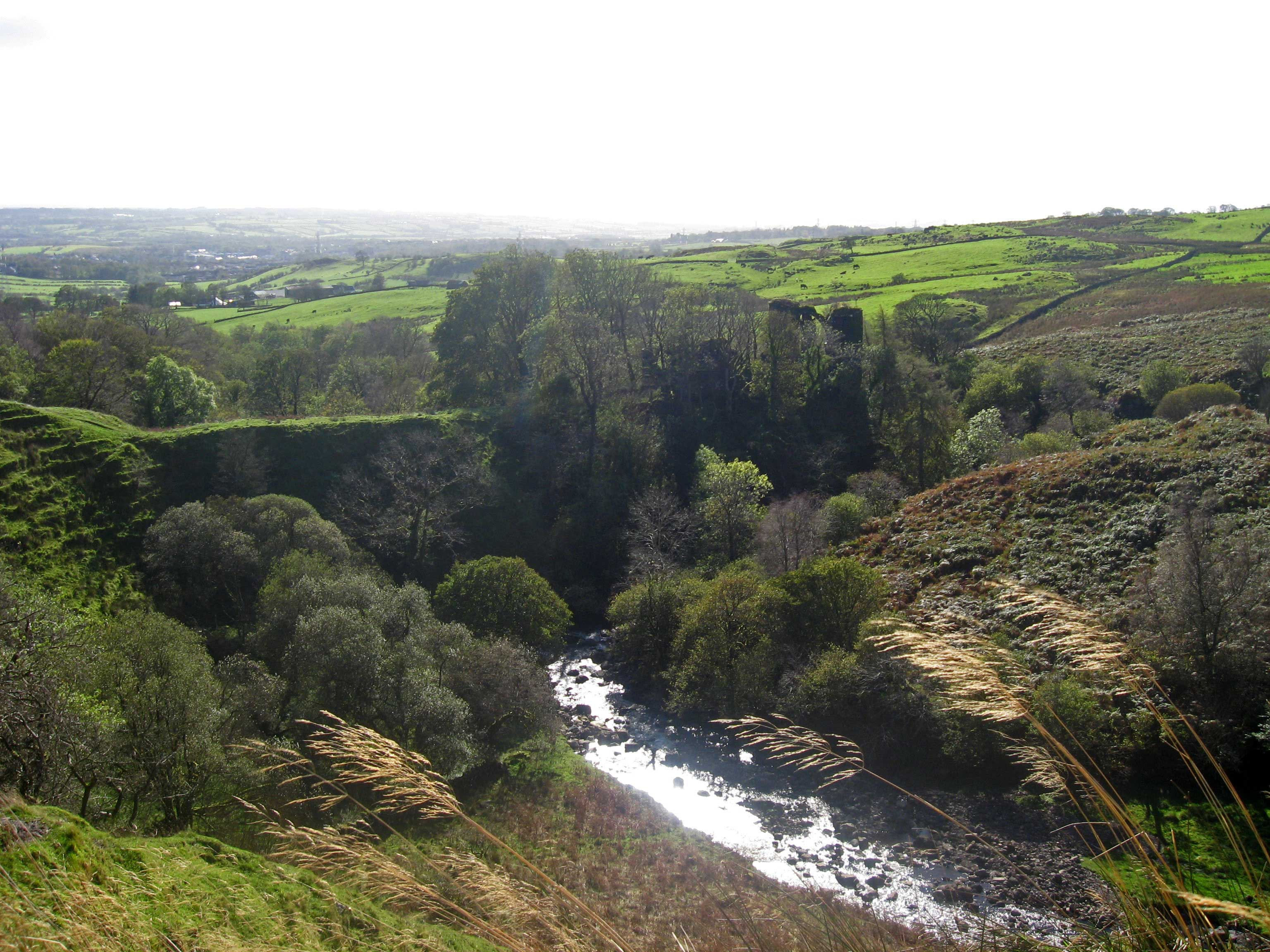
The ravine of Glen Garnock, and Glengarnock Castle

"Glen Garnock" pertains specifically to the short, sometimes precipitous, section of ravine overlooked by the ruins of Glengarnock Castle north of Kilbirnie; whereas "The Garnock Valley" refers to a wider geographic area of North Ayrshire abutting Renfrewshire, which encompasses the former parishes of Beith, Dalry, and Kilbirnie.

== Estuary ==
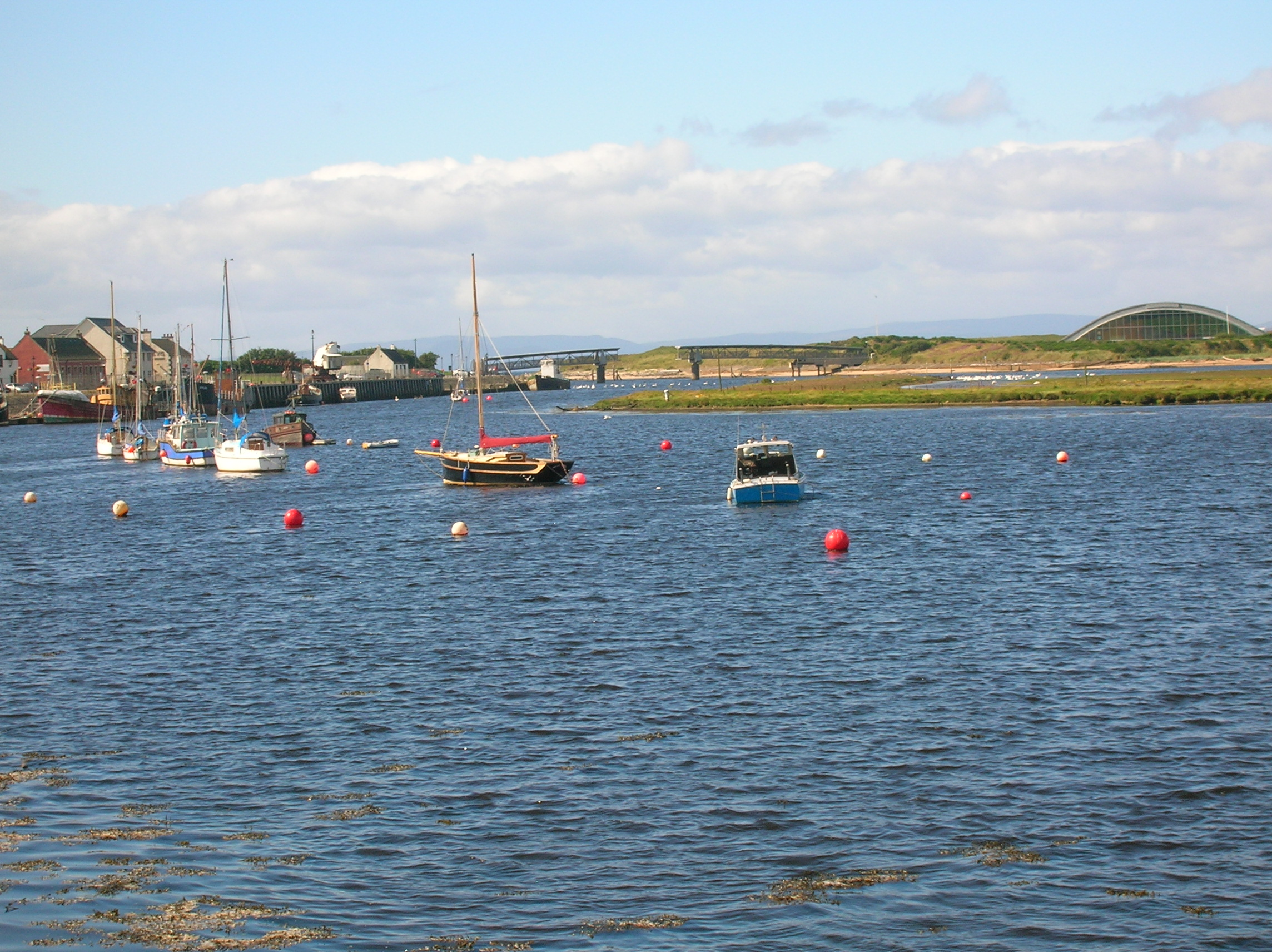
The Garnock Estuary with Irvine Harbour

The largest estuary within Ayrshire has developed at the confluence of the Irvine and Garnock Rivers, behind the Ardeer Peninsula. As a bar-built estuary, it is the only major estuary between the Solway and inner Clyde. The majority of the estuary has been designated a SSSI, in recognition of its national importance for three bird species: eider, red-breasted merganser and the goldeneye). It is also a feeding ground for thousands of migrating birds during the spring and autumn. Otters and water voles live on the estuary as well as numerous breeding birds, including water rail, grasshopper warbler, and sand martin. The Garnock-Irvine estuary is also a Wildlife Site.

Bogside Flats SSSI covers 253.8 ha (627 acres) that include inter-tidal mudflats, salt-marsh and adjacent pasture land.

== Places of interest ==
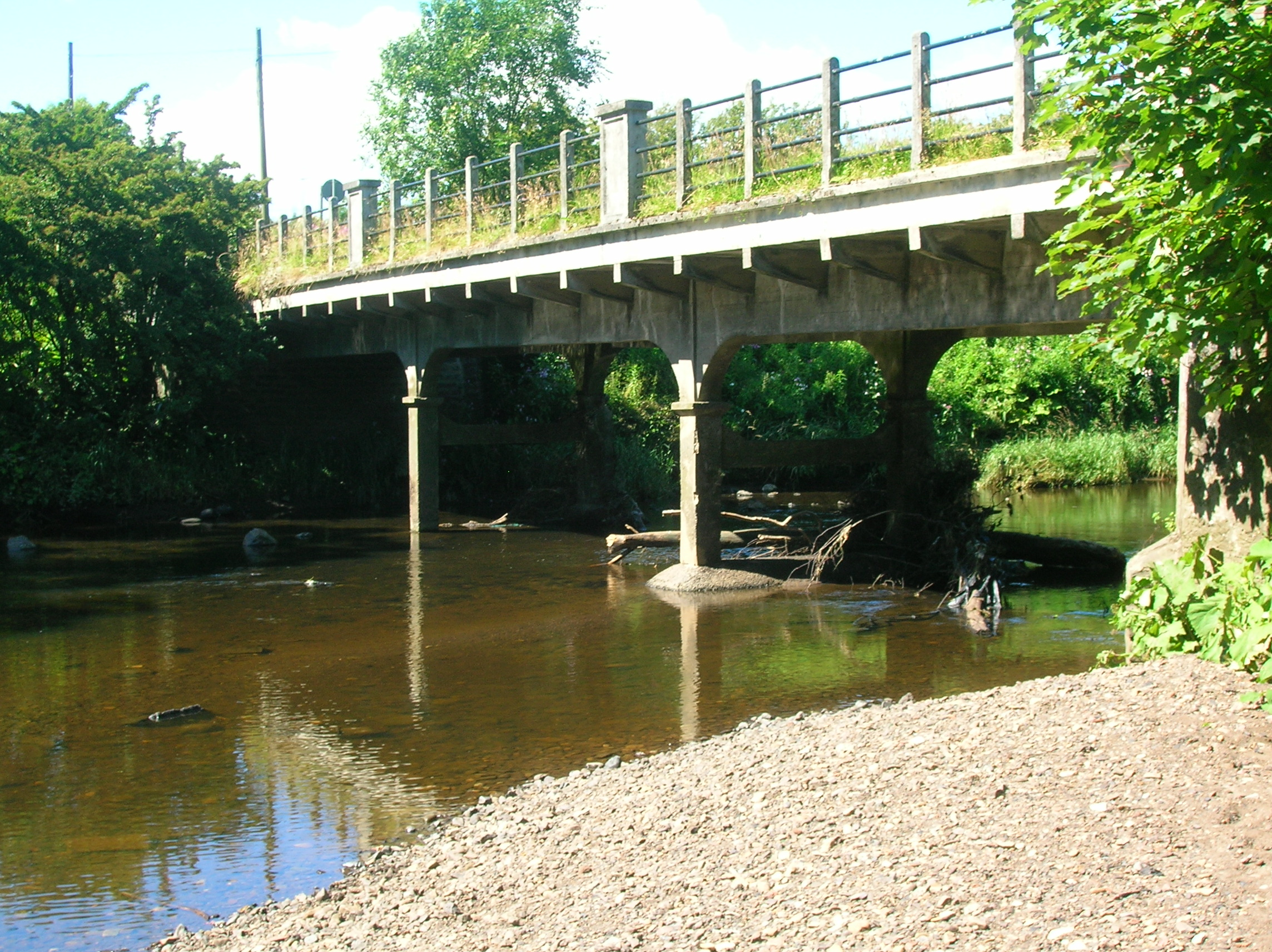
Dalgarven Bridg leading to the mill

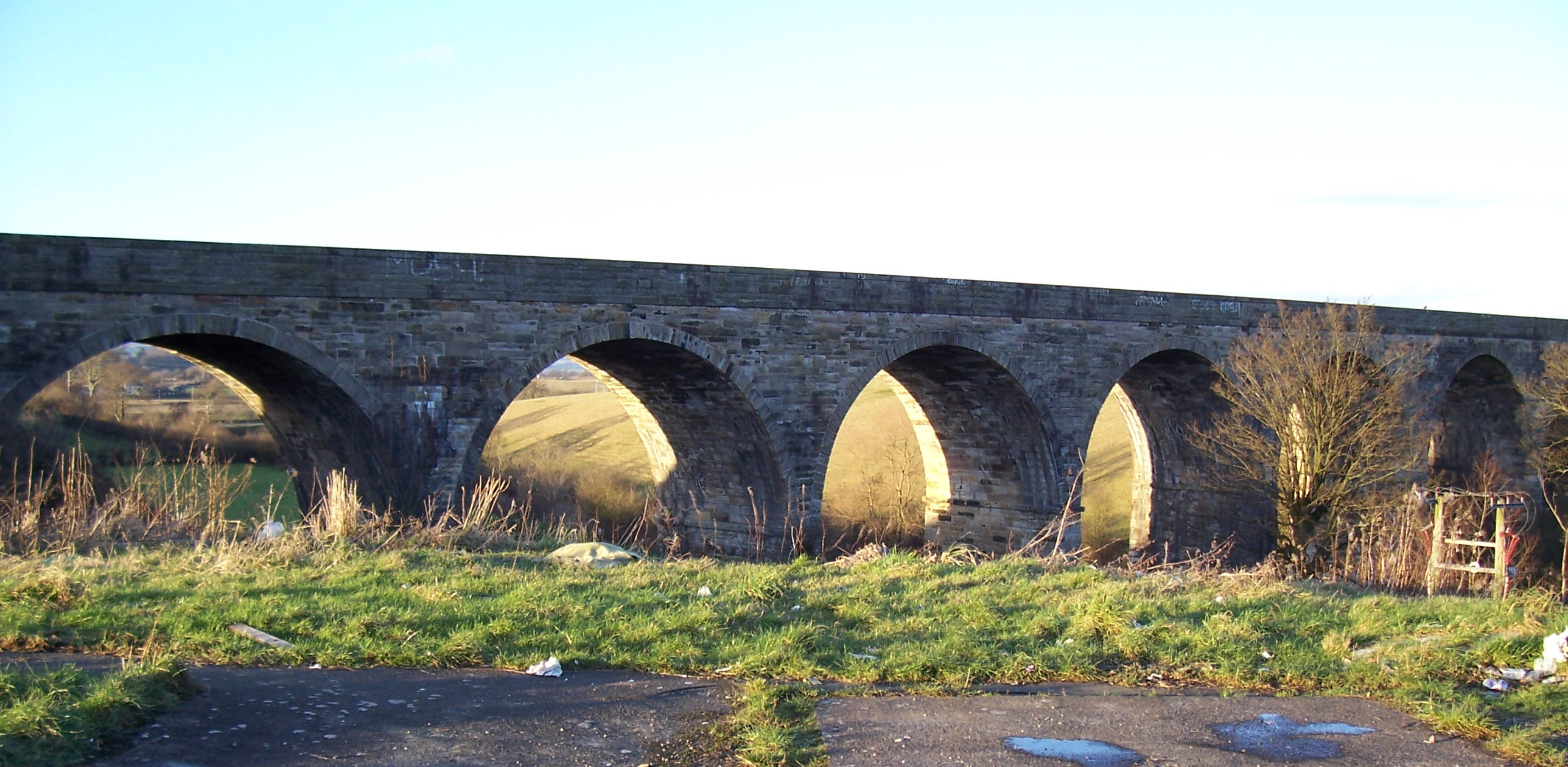
Kilwinning Viaduct

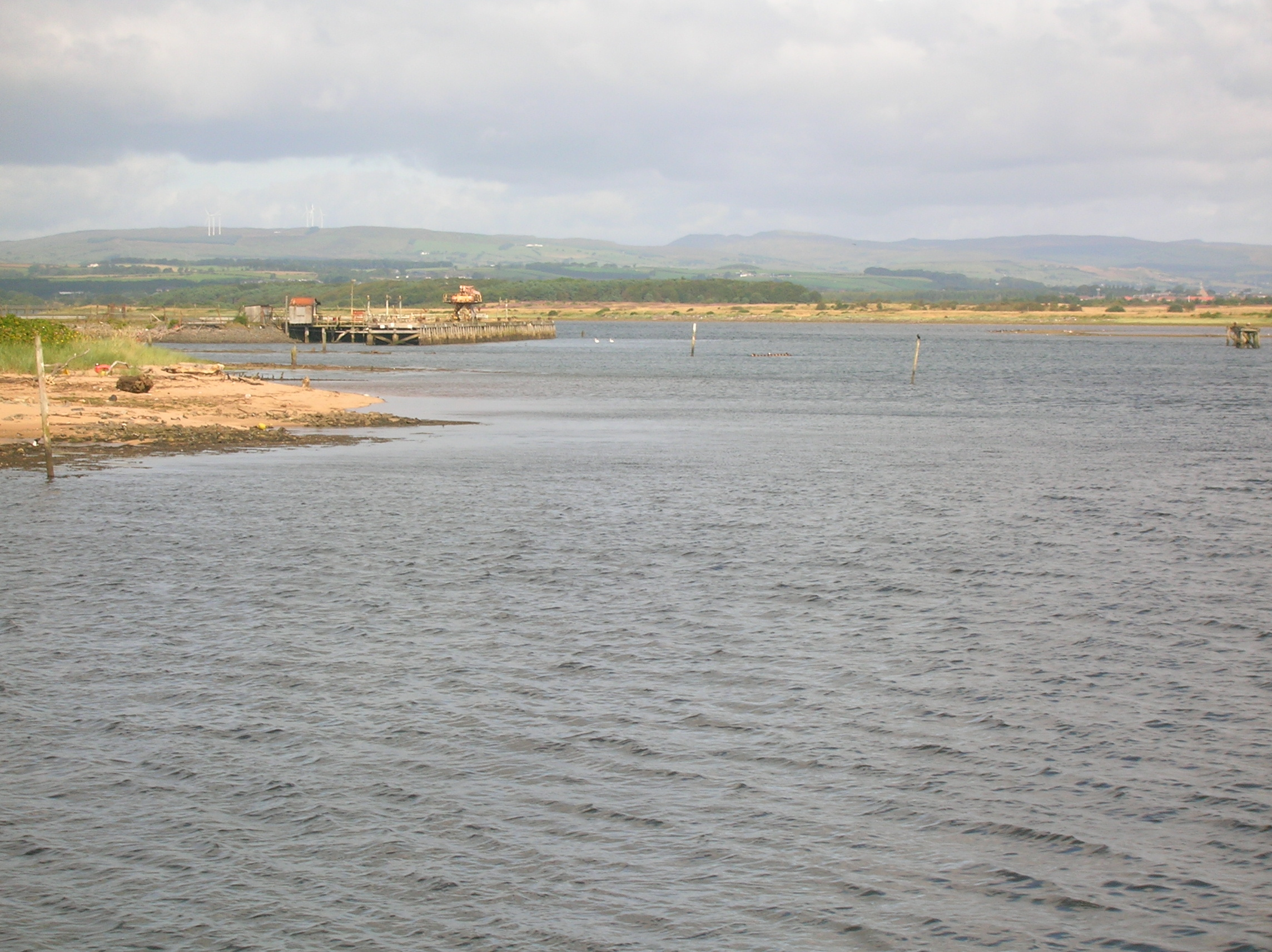
Ardeer Factory the disused jetty

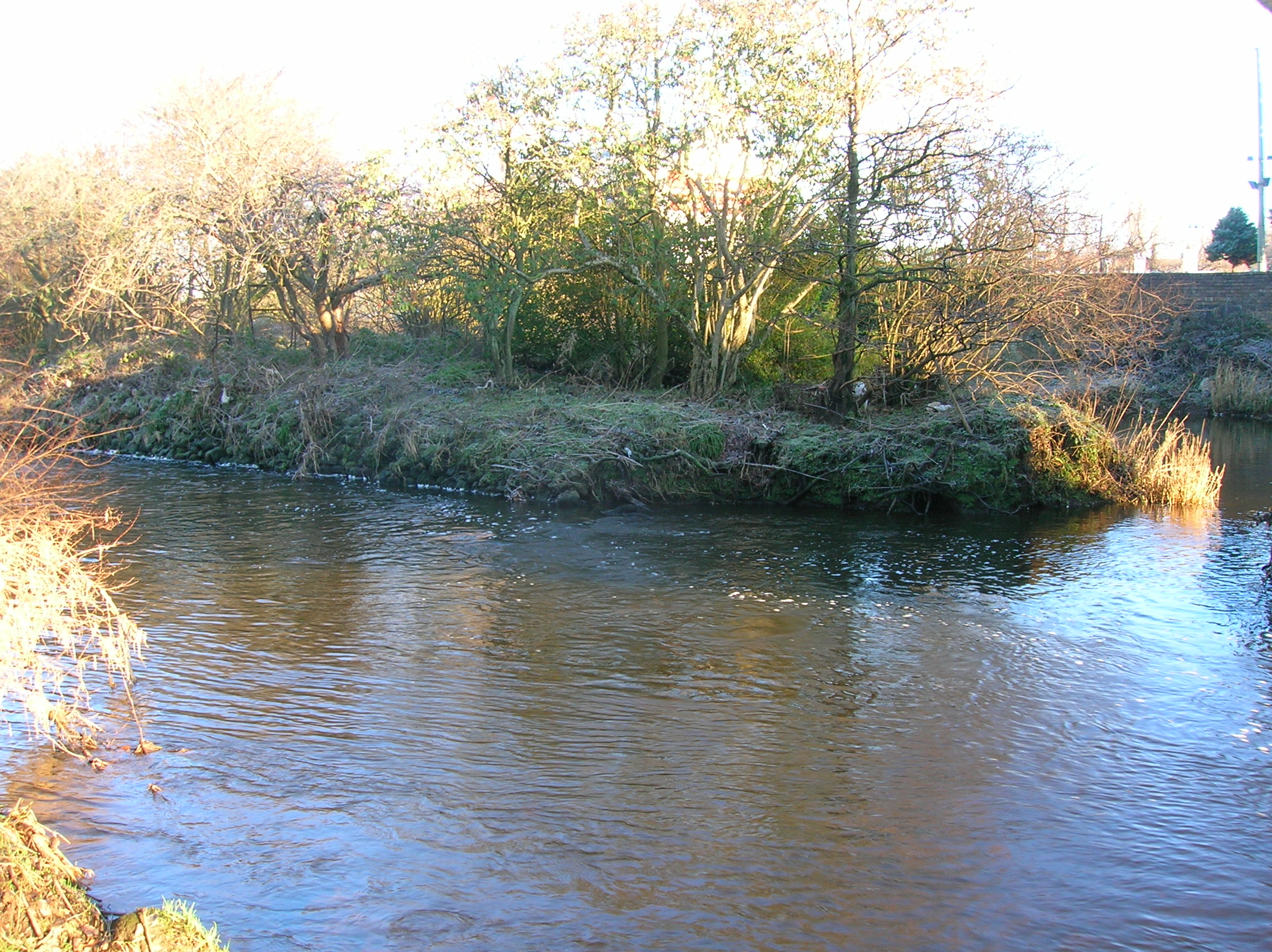
The islet in the Garnock at Kilwinning, just upstream of the bridge and shown as part of the old Bleaching Green on the 1896 OS map

- Clyde Muirshiel Regional Park is the source of the headwaters of the Garnock.
- Spout of Garnock is the highest waterfall in Ayrshire.
- Glengarnock Castle is a ruined keep standing on a remote rocky promontory overlooking the river, about 2 miles (3.2 km) north of Kilbirnie.
- Nether Mill (or Nethermyln), in Kilbirnie, is a ruined watermill that leaves as its legacy the name of the local football team, Kilbirnie Ladeside, who originally played in a field beside the mill lade running from a weir on the river to the mill at the end of Knoxville Road.
- Dalgarven Mill still draws water from the Garnock to turn the restored undershot waterwheel. The mill complex, located off the A737 road north of Kilwinning, is now a tourist attraction with the mill building being home to the Museum of Ayrshire Country Life and Costume.
- Kilwinning Viaduct, on the former Lanarkshire and Ayrshire Railway, is now used by the Sustrans Garnock Valley Cycleway to get across the river.
- Eglinton Country Park was developed around the ancient Eglinton Castle Estate, home for 600 years to the Earls of Eglinton and Winton.
- In the River Garnock, some distance below Kilwinning Bridge in the Dirrans area in the vicinity of the old saw mill and close to where the lade to the mill started, was Saint Ninian's Isle, named after the saint who is otherwise mainly commemorated at Whithorn. It is now part of the river banking.
- Down river near the confluence with the Lugton Water were the "Mess John's Steps", stepping stones across the river as shown on the first edition of the 6 inch OS map. This term was used in the 17th century as a jocular, but derogatory, term for a minister, especially a Presbyterian one not appointed by the congregation. The term "mess" derives from "the mass". The name is thus effectively "The Minister's Steps".
- Between Ninian's Isle and the steps, just before the bend of the river, is an area named Cullim's Hole.
- Smith records in 1895 that an island called Ringen's Isle existed in the Garnock. This may have been named after Saint Ringen or Winning.
- Salmon generally arrive in the Garnock at the end of July, with the most productive part of the river being the stretch between Kilbirnie and Dalry.
- Garnock Floods is a wildlife reserve of the Scottish Wildlife Trust in Kilwinning, enclosed between the railway line, Sandy Road and the river. One of two "lost loops" of the River Garnock ran through it and now only carries the Redburn to its confluence with the Garnock.
- Two sections of canal were dug in the 19th century at Nethermains and between Longford and Bogend to permit the drainage of two loops of the Garnock.
- Ardeer Factory, once the world's largest commercial explosives factory, is situated on a natural peninsula with the Firth of Clyde on its west side, the River Garnock to the east, and the mouth of the River Irvine to the south.

== Tributaries ==
=== Pundeavon Burn ===
Confluence from the right at Coordinates : 55°45′23″N 4°41′08″W

The Pundeavon Burn drains from Pundeavon Reservoir and enters the Garnock just upstream of Kilbirnie Cross.

=== Paduff Burn ===
Confluence from the right at Coordinates : 55°45′13″N 4°41′08″W

The Paduff Burn is a small stream, known locally as Jock's Burn, which comes into play on the golf course at Kilbirnie Place Golf Club.

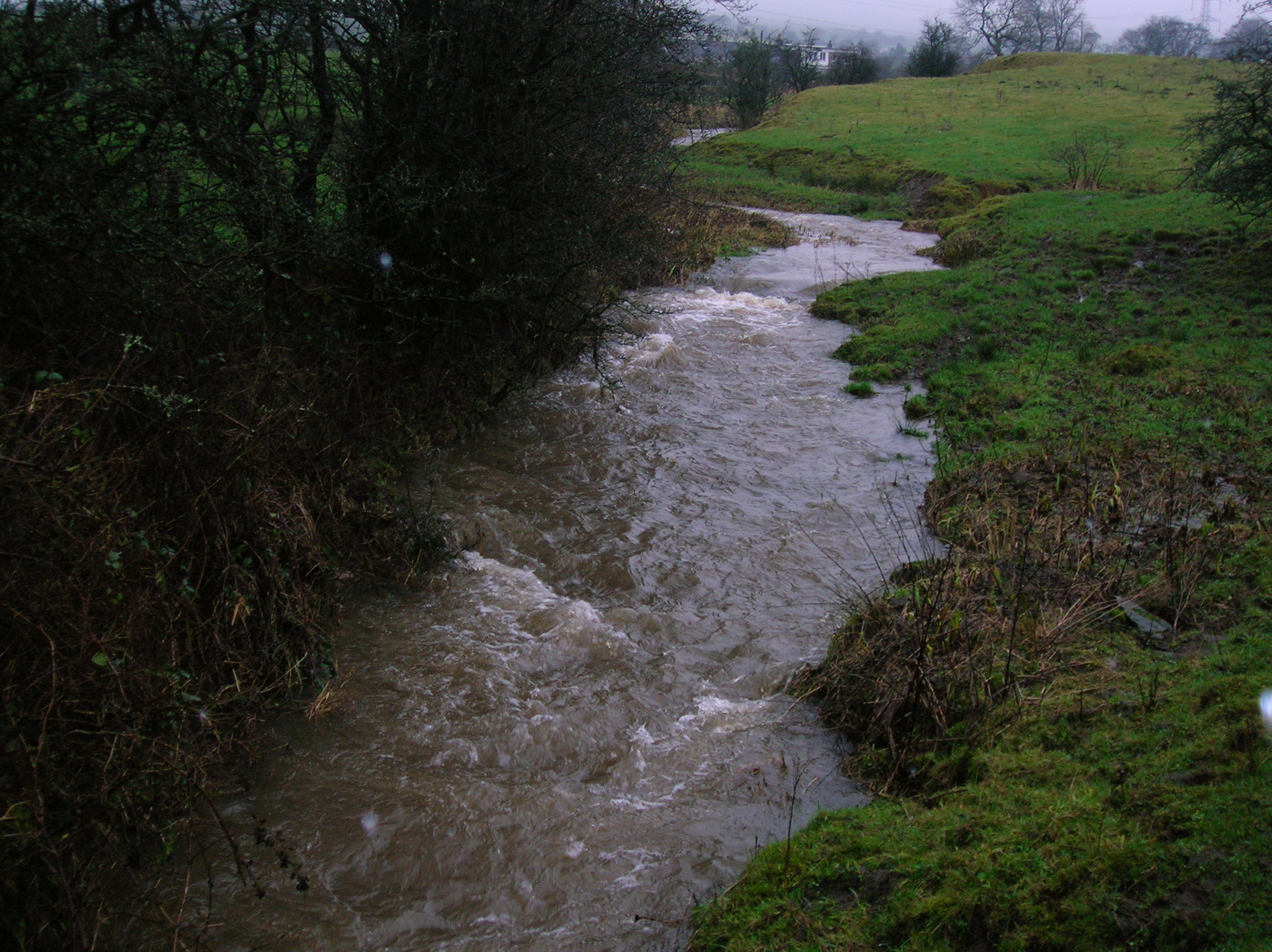
Powgree Burn near Geilsland from Broadstone Bridge.

=== Powgree Burn ===
Confluence from the left at Coordinates : 55°44′11″N 4°40′46″W

The Powgree Burn rises on Cuff hill in the Gateside area, runs east of the old Speir's school, through Auchengree and Longbar then shortly after runs under Glengarnock railway station.

=== Pitcon Burn ===
Confluence from the right at Coordinates : 55°43′09″N 4°42′14″W

The Pitcon Burn cuts deep into the hillside causing the tree lined gully known as Swinlees Glen, a Nature Conservation Site, and enters the Garnock near its namesake Pitcon House.

=== Rye Water ===
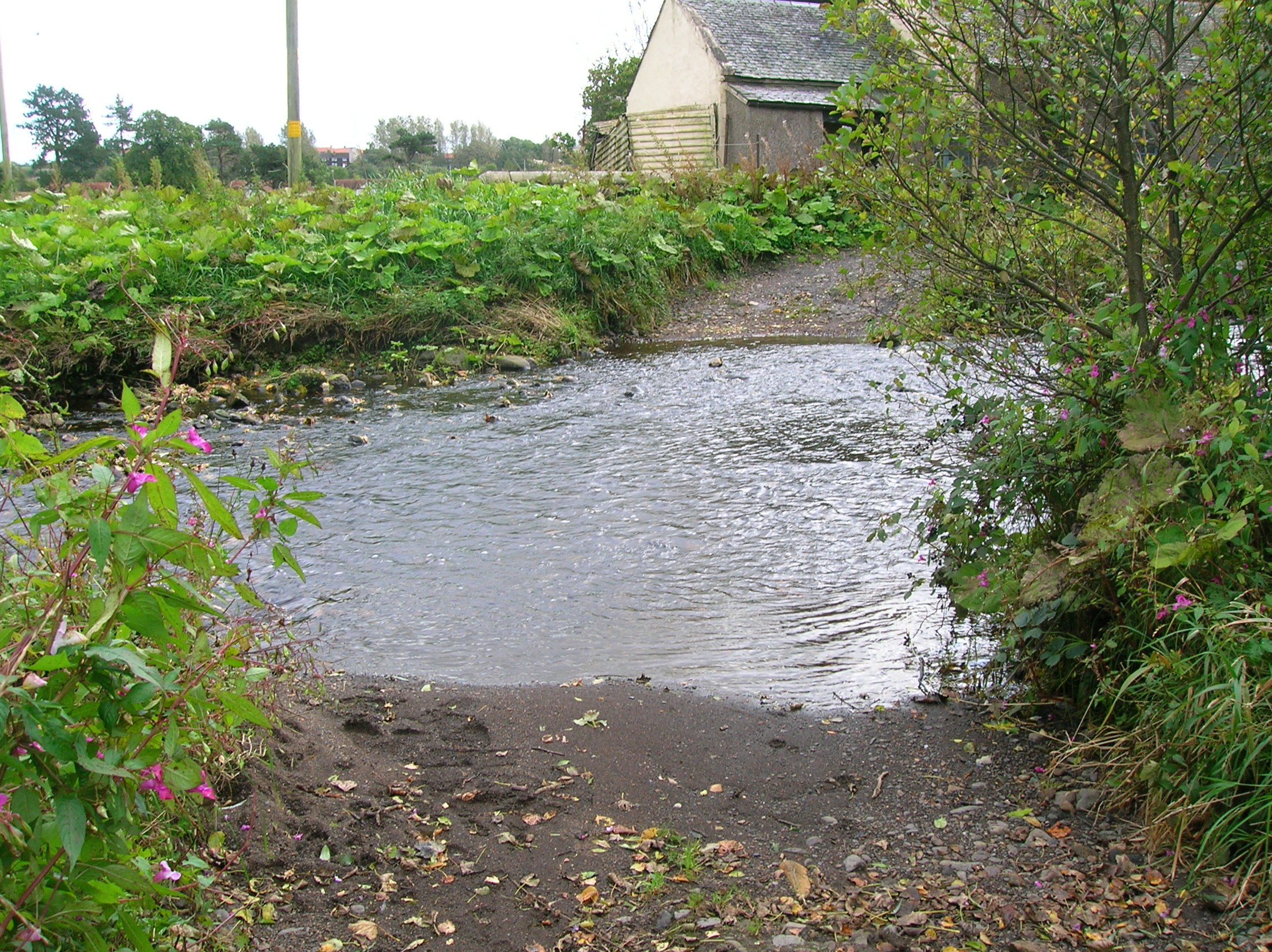
The Rye Water and ford in Dalry.

Confluence from the right at Coordinates : 55°42′42″N 4°42′28″W

The Rye Water drains from the area of Muirhead Reservoir and Camphill Reservoir and runs through the old village of Drakemyre to join the Garnock north of Dalry near Brownhill Junction on the main railway line. A ford across the river at Drakemyre is associated with the song "Comin' Thro' the Rye".

=== Putyan Burn ===
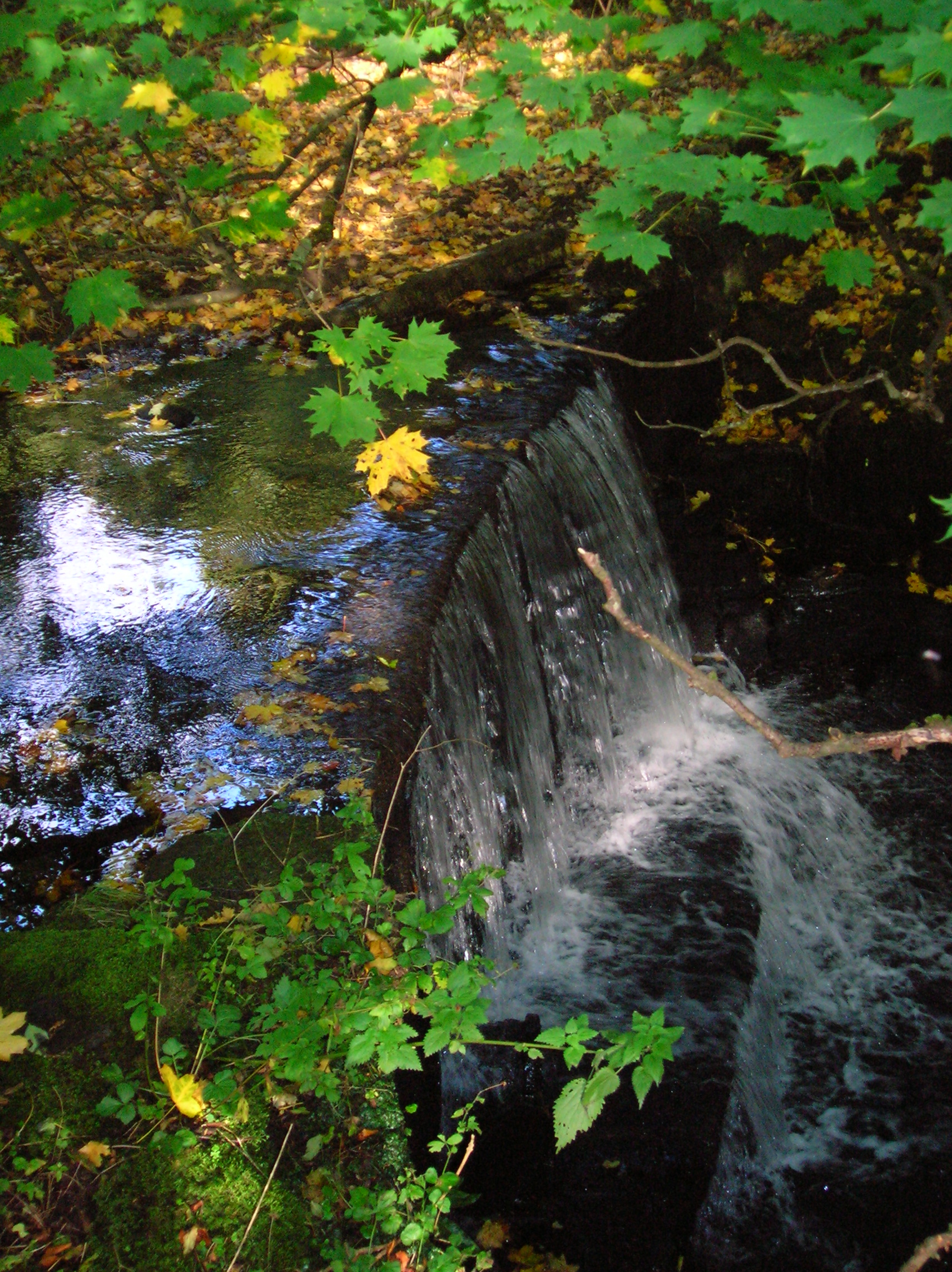
The weir or dam on the Putyan Burn.

The Putyan Burn forms from a number of small burns, etc., such as the Baidland Burn from Baidland Hill and springs at Baidland Mill. It reaches its confluence with the Garnock at Putyan Cottage and the Lynn Holm, near the road junction for Ardrossan at the Kilwinning end of the town. It passes Broadlie House where a small weir or dam still exists as part of an abandoned 1892 hydroelectric scheme which provided the house with its own electricity. The burn has its confluence with the Garnock near the Lovers' Bridge in Dalry.

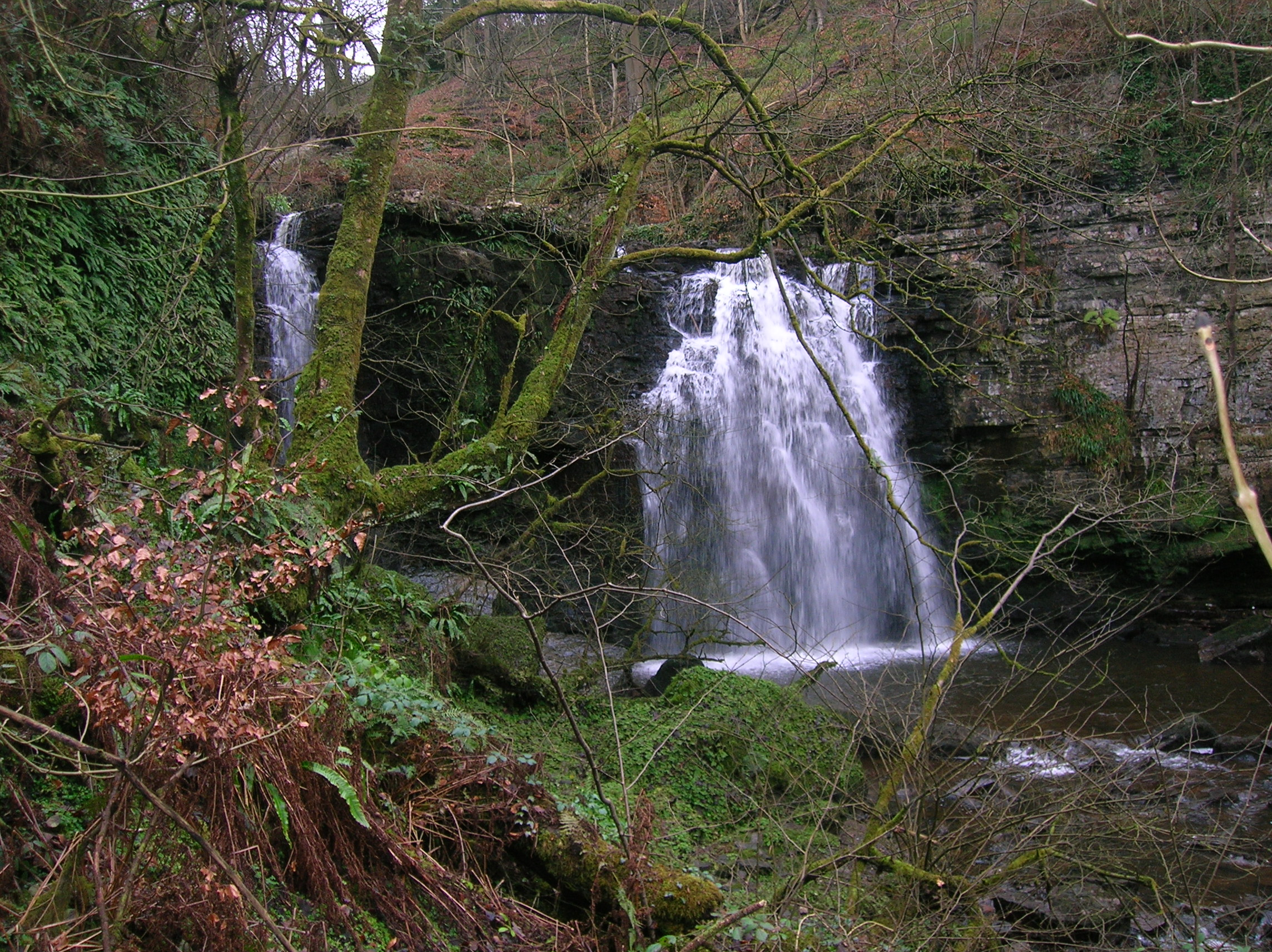
Lynn Glen

=== Caaf Water ===
Confluence from the right at Coordinates : 55°41′52″N 4°42′50″W

The Caaf Water drains from Caaf Reservoir and soon passes the Michelin star rated Braidwoods Restaurant, before entering the Lynn Glen with its waterfall and finally enters the Garnock south of Dalry.

=== Bombo Burn ===
Confluence from the left at Coordinates : 55°41′28″N 4°42′34″W

The Bombo Burn is a small stream, only about 5 miles (8.0 km) in length, that runs across the north side of Bankhead Moss, a Special Area of Conservation and joins the Garnock soon after passing through the Blair Estate:

The delightfully landscaped grounds and gardens of the Estate contain a wonderful mixture of species trees and shrubs from all over the world. The Bombo Burn meanders gently for a mile through the gardens creating many natural beauty spots. The ancient yew tree recorded in the Domesday Book leans over the banks of the Bombo Burn presiding on the changes over the centuries.

=== Dusk Water ===
Confluence from the left at Coordinates : 55°40′49″N 4°42′44″W

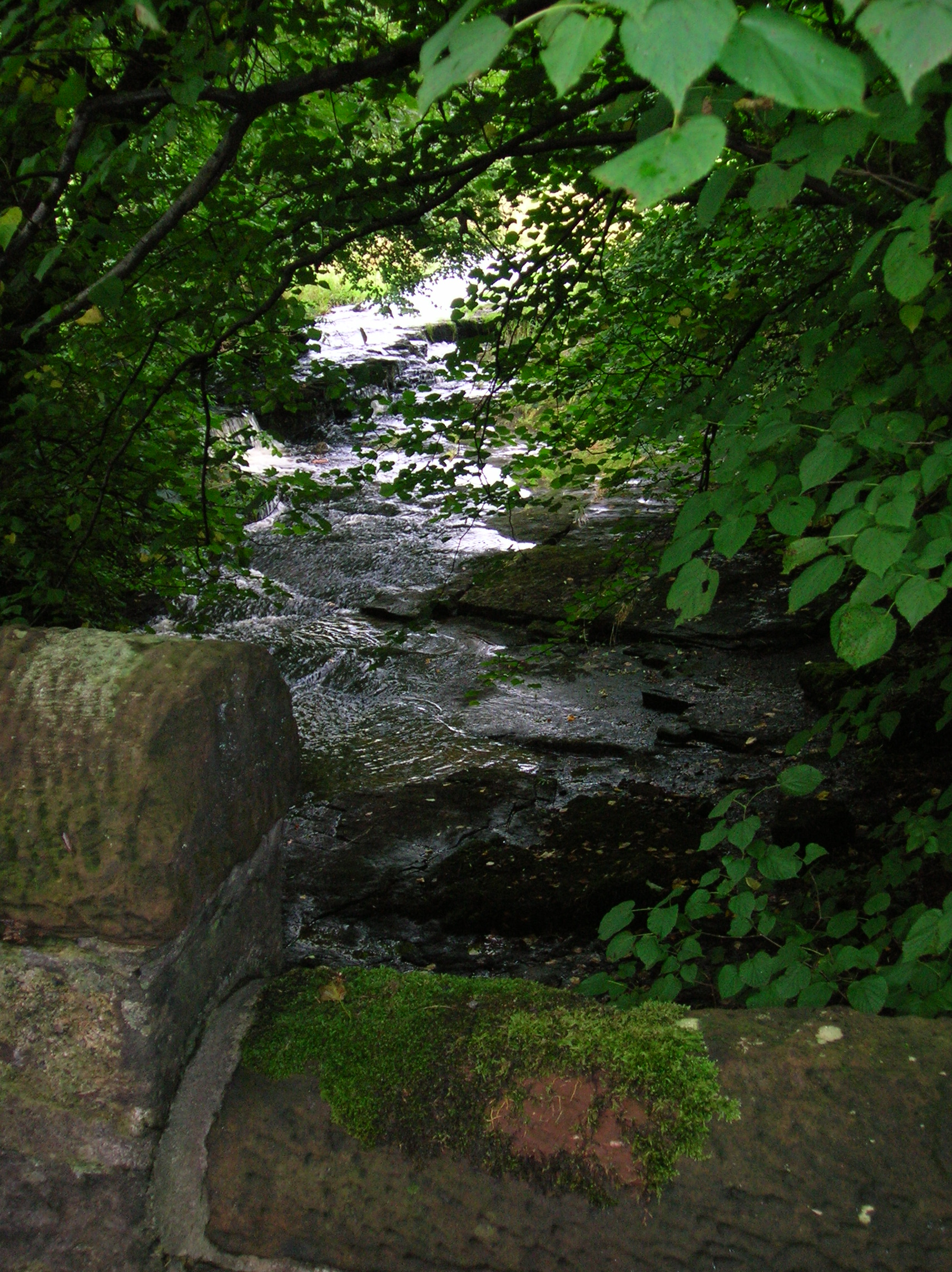
The Dusk Water at Hessilhead Town Farm running down towards the old saw mill.

The Dusk Water is a stream that has its beginnings on Cuff Hill, near Beith, and runs through Barrmill to eventually join the Garnock upstream of Dalgarven.

Interesting places along its course, as well as several old watermills, are Giffin House, a large and handsome mansion-house, and Cleeves Cove, a system of caves in the Dusk Glen.

A couple of miles from the source of the Dusk, a sluice diverts water via a tunnel into the eastern end of the Roebank reservoir, which feeds the Muirdykes water treatment works supplying much of the Paisley area with drinking water.

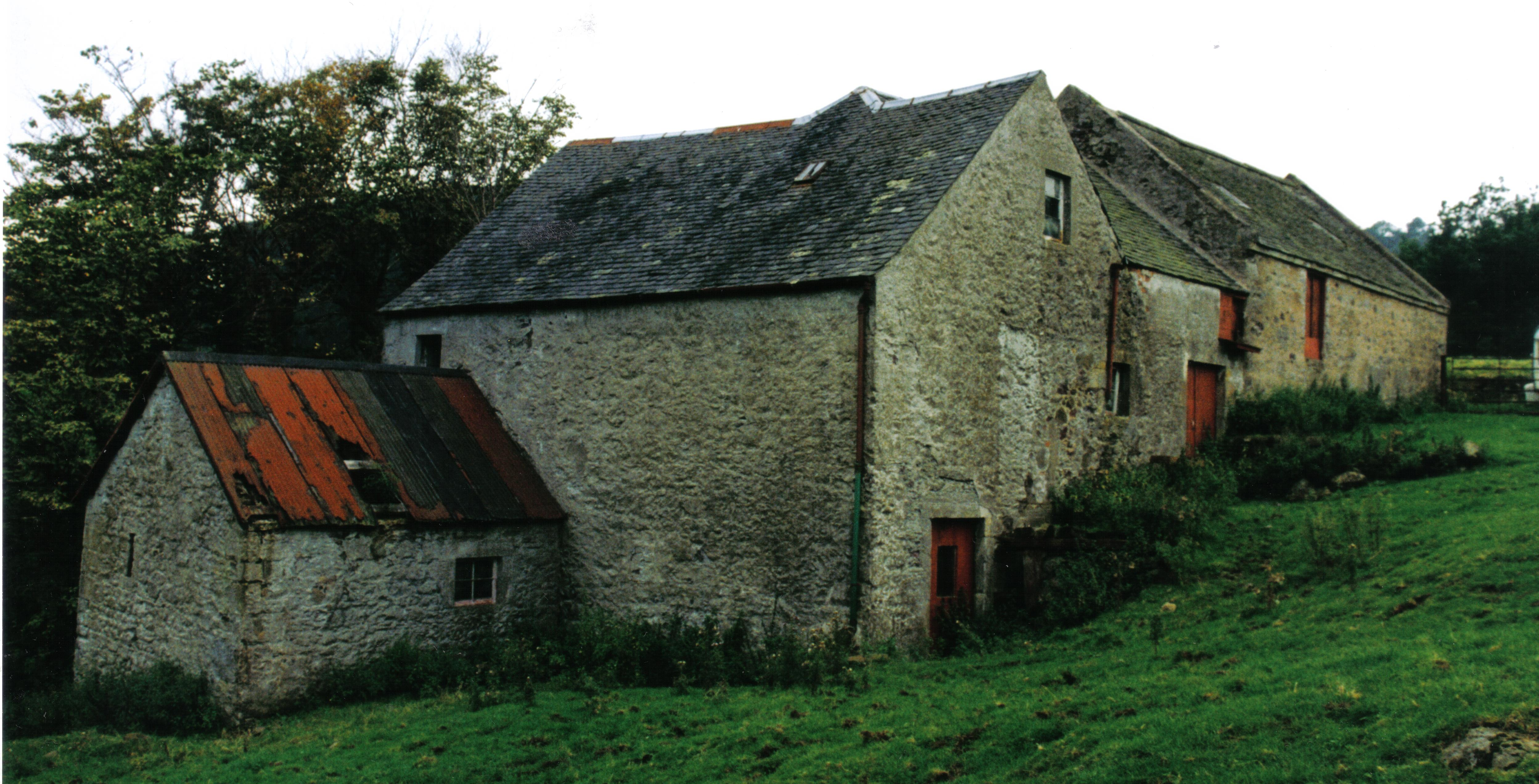
Coldstream Mill

==== Mills ====
- Coldstream Mill is located on the south side of Cuff Hill. The grain mill can still operate today, albeit only for demonstration purposes, with water supplied from the scenic mill dam.
- Giffen Mill (or Barr Mill) is a ruined grain mill in the village of Barrmill.
- Blair Mill was a traditional corn mill for the large Blair estate in Dalry. It was probably built in the late 18th century and ceased to be used as a mill in the 1950s.
- Waterside Mill, lying downstream of the Dusk Glen, is now a residence.

=== Lugton Water ===
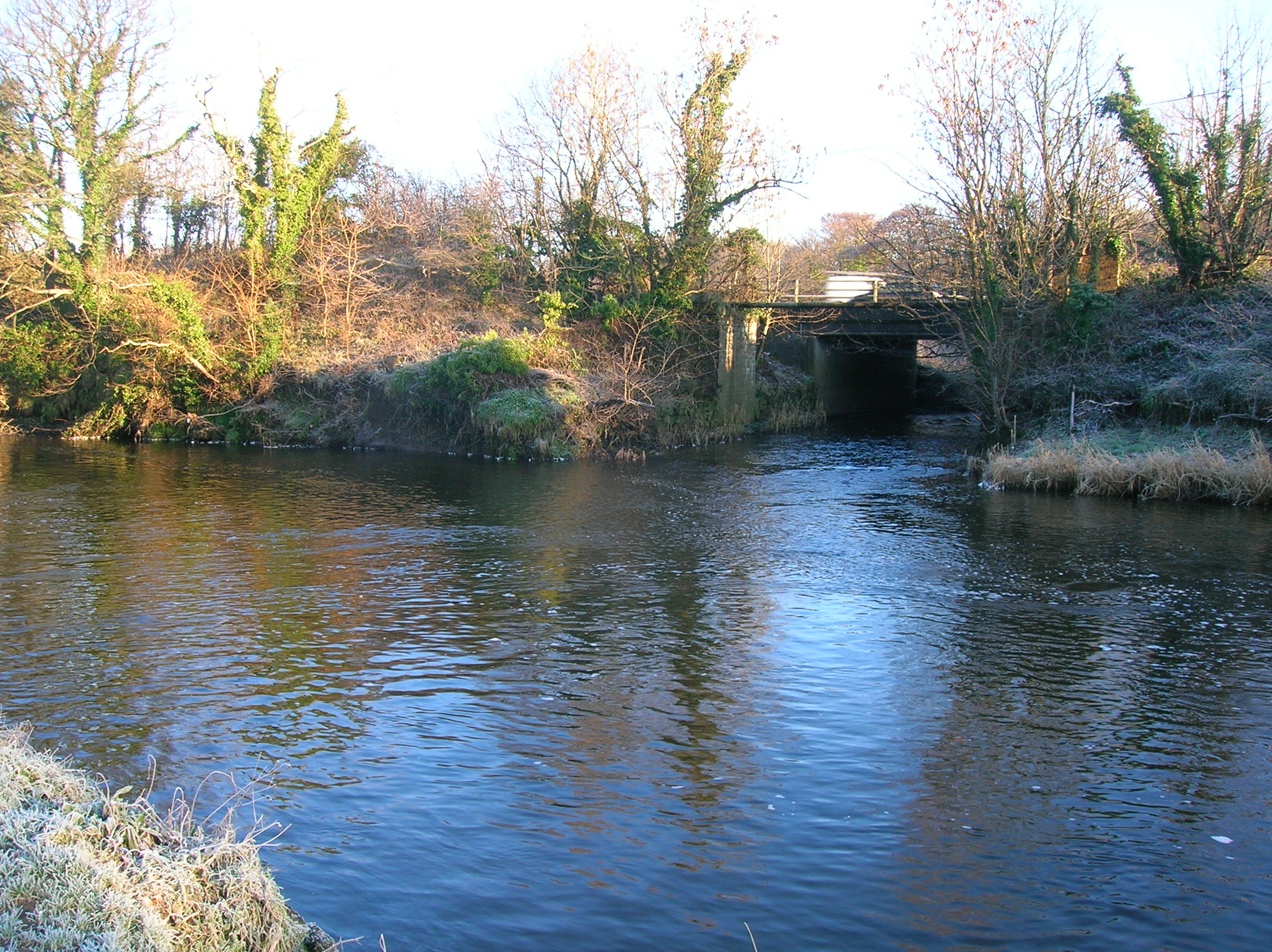
The confluence of the Lugton Water and the River Garnock.

Confluence from the left at Coordinates : 55°38′35″N 4°41′08″W

The Lugton Water, the largest tributary of the Garnock, runs 14 miles (23 km) from Loch Libo (395 feet above sea-level) in Uplawmoor, through Lugton and the parishes of Neilston, Beith, Dunlop, Stewarton and Kilwinning. The Lugton joins the Garnock below the tidal limit, shortly after passing through Eglinton Country Park, developed around the ancient estate of the Earl of Eglinton.

== River Irvine ==
Confluence at Coordinates : 55°26′38″N 4°41′23″W

The two main rivers of North Ayrshire, the Irvine and the Garnock, come together in the estuary at Irvine Harbour where they jointly enter the Firth of Clyde.

Major tributaries of the Irvine are the Glen Water, Cessnock Water, Kilmarnock Water (combined Fenwick and Craufurdland Waters), Carmel Water and Annick Water..

== The Garnock and the Irvine ==
These rivers flow into the estuary, the Garnock being swelled by the Annick Water that has its confluence at the Dirrans in Kilwinning. The silt from these rivers has created the Bogside mudflats and the course of these rivers has been greatly altered over the centuries through both natural and man made influences.

=== A mining disaster ===
On 20 June 1833 the surface of the Garnock was seen to be ruffled and it was discovered that a section of the river bed had collapsed into mineworkings beneath. The river was now flowing into miles of mineworkings of the Snodgrass, Bartonholm and Longford collieries. Attempts were made to block the breach with clay, whin, straw, etc. to no avail. The miners had been safely brought to the surface and were able to witness the sight of the river standing dry for nearly a mile downstream, with fish jumping about in all directions. The tide brought in sufficient water to complete the flooding of the workings and the river level returned to normal. The weight of the floodwater was so great that the compressed air broke through the ground in many places and many acres of ground were observed to bubble up like a pan of boiling water. In some places rents and cavities appeared measuring four or five feet in diameter, and from these came a roaring sound described as being like steam escaping from a safety valve. For about five hours great volumes of water and sand were thrown up into the air like fountains and the mining villages of Bartonholm, Snodgrass, Longford and Nethermains were flooded.

Archibald William, the enterprising 13th Earl of Eglinton purchased all the lands concerned in 1852 and through the simple expedient of cutting a short canal at Bogend, across the loop of the river involved, he bypassed the breach and once the river course had been drained and sealed off he was able to have the flooded mineworkings pumped out. The breach lay on the sea side of the loop close to Bogend on the Snodgrass Holm side. The Earl leased the mines to Bairds of Gartsherrie and the "Eglinton Iron Works" were born.

== The curse of Saint Winning ==
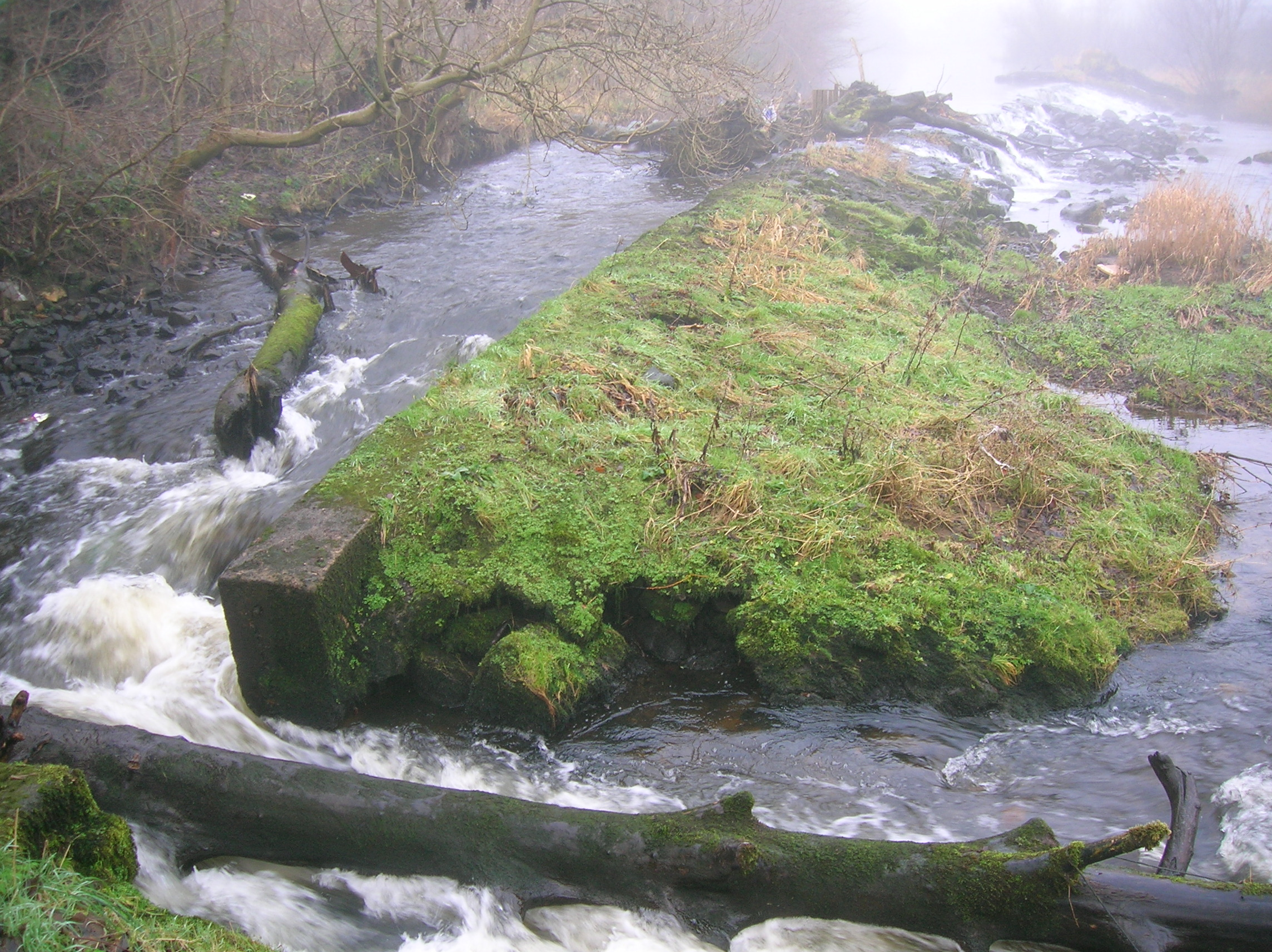
The old Bridgend Mill weir, once the possession of Kilwinning Abbey

A legend tells of Saint Winning sending his monks to fish in the Garnock, however no matter how hard they tried or how long they persevered they could catch nothing. The saint in response placed a curse on the river, preventing it from ever having fish in its waters; the river responded by changing course and thereby avoiding the curse. It is clear that the river has substantially changed its course in recorded history, previously having entered the sea at Stevenston. Ardeer therefore being an island at that time. Blaeu's map printed in 1654 shows this.

It was also noted during the construction of a canal serving early coal pits at Ardeer that the small lochans used to ease construction lay on the old course of the River Garnock.

== The Earls of Eglinton ==
It is recorded in official documents of the 1770 "Trial of Mungo Campbell for the Murder of Alexander, Earl of Eglinton" that Alexander Montgomery, 10th Earl of Eglinton was very protective of his fishing rights on the River Garmock to the extent that he banned fishing on the river altogether. Mungo Campbell even sold his fishing rod; however the murder of the earl in 1769 was as a direct result of Mungo being accused of poaching at Ardrossan's North Bay and Lord Eglinton's attempt to confiscate his gun.
