= Chaddesley Corbett =

Village in Worcestershire, England

Coordinates: 52.360725°N 2.159672°W

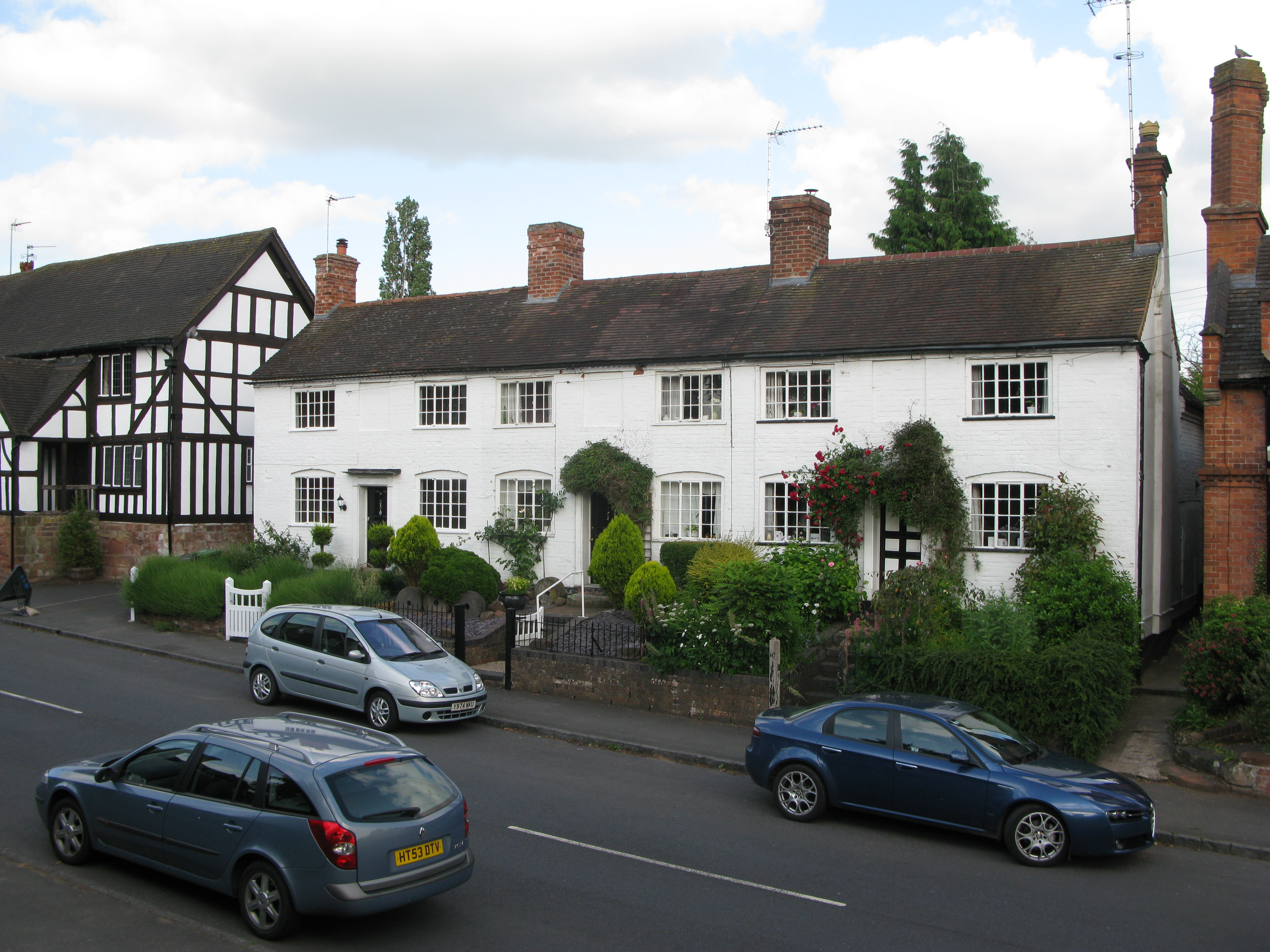
- Church View, Chaddesley Corbett

- Location within Worcestershire
- Population: 1,491 (2021)
- Civil parish: Chaddesley Corbett
- District: Wyre Forest
- Shire county: Worcestershire
- Region: West Midlands
- Country: England
- Sovereign state: United Kingdom
- Post town: Kidderminster
- Postcode district: DY10
- Website: https://www.chaddesley-corbett.co.uk/

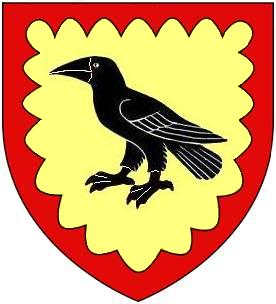
Arms of Corbet of Chaddesley Corbet: Or a raven proper within a bordure engrailed gules. A cadet branch of the ancient family of Corbet of Caus Castle was seated at the manor of Chaddesley.

Chaddesley Corbett is a village and civil parish in the Wyre Forest District of Worcestershire, England. The Anglican and secular versions of the parish include other named neighbourhoods, once farmsteads or milling places: Bluntington, Brockencote, Mustow Green, Cakebole, Outwood, Harvington, and Drayton. The parish population was 1,491 in 2021.

== History ==
The village was named Chad Lea, or the place of Chad, in Saxon times, and is recorded in the Domesday Book of 1086 as Cedeslai, when it was held by a woman, Eadgifu, who also held it in the time of King Edward before the Norman Conquest of 1066. It consisted of eight berewicks and 25 hides of which 10 were free of geld and had the value of £12. The area was subject to forest law for around a century to 1301, as part of Feckenham Forest.

== Geography ==
Chaddesley Corbett is centred on the north side of the A448 approximately midway between the north Worcestershire towns of Bromsgrove and Kidderminster.

In 1913 the parish was stated to have just under 5% woodland, namely 242 3/4 acres (98.2 ha). Of this the main feature is Chaddesley Woods, which is recognised as a national nature reserve and lies to the east of the village. It is thought to be a remnant of the medieval Feckenham Forest. It is under the care of the Worcestershire Wildlife Trust, founded in 1968 to conserve, protect and restore the county's wildlife. The main section of the woods has a network of public footpaths to facilitate access.

== Demography ==
Chaddesley Corbett covers a relatively large 6,079 acres, that is 24.6 square kilometres (9.5 sq mi) and had a population of 1343 persons and 280 houses in 1821.

The same area had a population of 1,440 persons across 607 households in 2001.

== Governance and religion ==
Chaddesley Corbett civil parish falls under the Wyre Forest District Council ward of Wyre Forest Rural, the Worcestershire County Council division of Chaddesley, and the parliamentary constituency of Wyre Forest, whose MP since 2010 is Mark Garnier of the Conservative Party.

It is within the Church of England province of Canterbury, the Diocese of Worcester, the Archdeaconry of Dudley, and the deanery of Kidderminster.

== Landmarks ==
=== St Cassian's Church ===
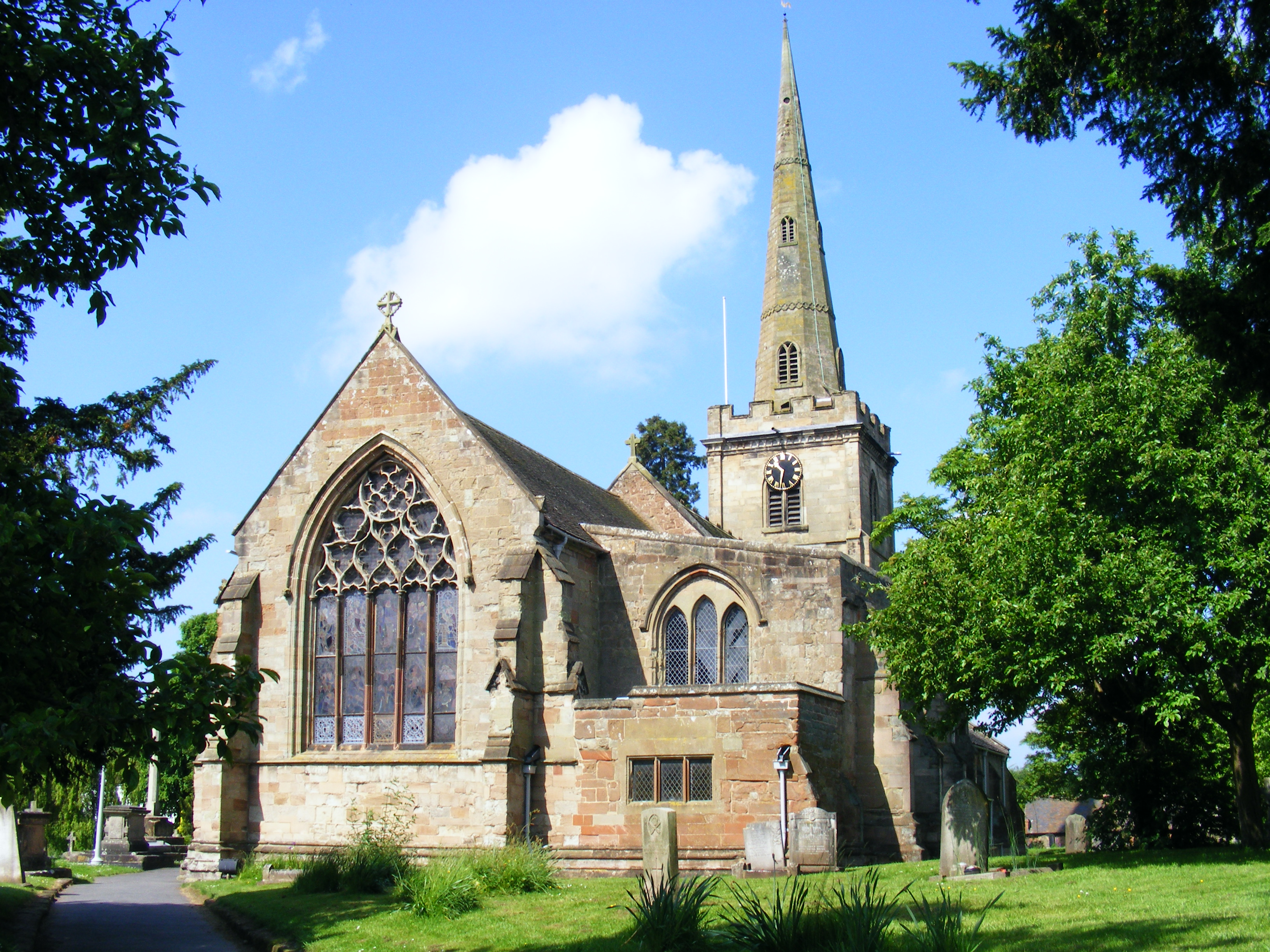
St Cassian's Church from the lych gate.

Within the village urban area is the Church of England church of St Cassian. The Domesday Book implies that there was a church at Chaddesley Corbett before 1086, although the present nave dates from the 12th century with later additions. St Nicholas Chapel was added in the 13th century, the chancel and north and south aisles in the 14th century, and the vestry probably added in the 16th century when the south aisle and St Nicholas Chapel were also altered. The tower and spire were added in the 18th century and the north aisle widened and vestry altered in the 19th century. The pipe organ, currently 3 manuals plus pedals, was first built in 1817 and relocated from a west gallery during major restoration and alterations in 1863–64. More recent additions include a roll of honour, housed in the tower, that lists those who served in World War I, and two windows commemorating soldiers killed during World War II.

The monuments include former owners of Harvington Hall as well as members of the Corbett family, local lords of the manor and benefactors of the church. Sir Thomas Holte, 1st Baronet in 1647 erected a memorial to his daughter Elizabeth. The fittings include a Norman stone font, which is thought to be the work of the Herefordshire School of sculptors, active c.1125–1150, which drew on Romanesque models from southern Europe. It features a main motif of interlaced dragons—symbolising, perhaps, the evil of original sin which is washed away in baptism—with other interlacing patterns along the rim and base. The dragons resemble Romanesque north Italian models, especially the pulpit of San Giulio abbey in Piedmont, but their interlacing is a motif of indigenous Anglo-Irish origin.

The churchyard contains the war graves of 4 British Army soldiers of World War I and 2 Royal Air Force officers of World War II.

=== Harvington Hall ===
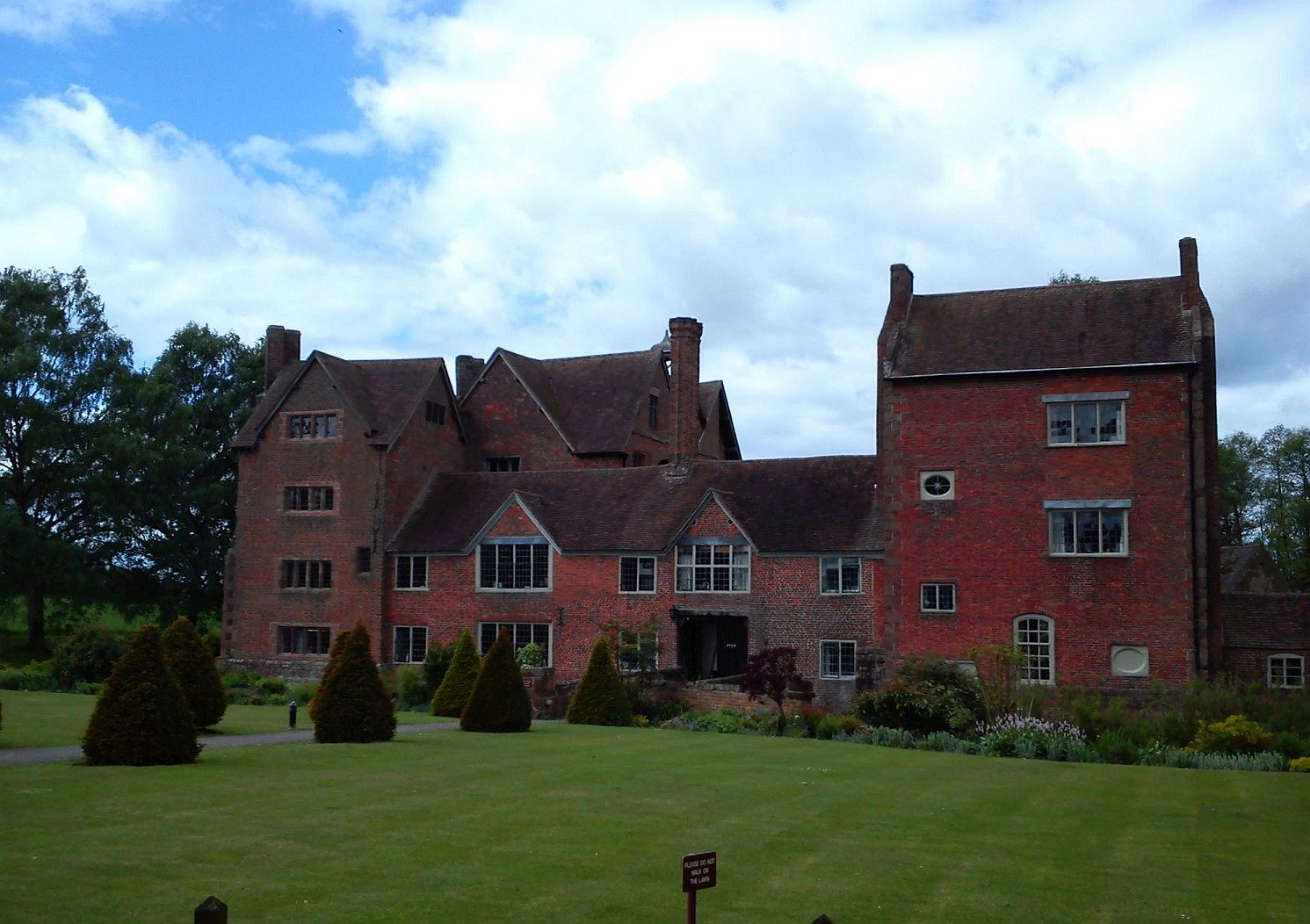
Harvington Hall near Chaddesley Corbett

Harvington Hall, located in the hamlet of Harvington in the civil parish of Chaddesley Corbett, is a moated medieval and Elizabethan manor house. Harvington Hall is particularly notable for its vestment-hide and seven priest-holes, four of which are built around the main staircase and are thought to be the work of Nicholas Owen.

=== Chapels ===
There is also a Methodist Chapel in Bluntington and a Catholic chapel associated with Harvington Hall.

== Amenities ==
The three village pubs, The Talbot, The Swan and The Fox were named in the 2007 Good Beer Guide.

There is also a post office and general store, a butcher, hairdresser and beauty salon, a flower shop, delicatessen and a GP surgery.

== Education ==
There are two schools in the village: Chaddesley Corbett Primary School and the independent Winterfold House School. The primary school caters for Reception to Year 6 and replaced the previous Chaddesley Corbett Endowed First School under the Wyre Forest education review. Each school has an associated pre-school nursery.

== Sport ==
Chaddesley Corbett Sports Club is located in Fox Lane and has rugby, football and cricket sections, all of which play in one or more local leagues. The cricket club is one of the oldest cricket clubs in Worcestershire having been established in 1862. The football team also known as Chaddesley Ravens have two adult teams, as well as a junior section. The club was established in 1906.

The village is the location for the Lady Dudley Cup, a point to point race that was first run in 1897.

== Notable people ==
- Sir Geoffrey Corbett (1881–1937), a member of the Indian Civil Service and a mountaineer, was brought up at Chaddesley Corbett
- Ellen Ferris (1870–1955), née Grant, owner of Harvington Hall, who gave it to the Diocese of Birmingham
- Robert Grant-Ferris, Baron Harvington (1907–1997), Deputy Speaker of the House of Commons 1970–1974, only son of Robert and Ellen Ferris (above)
- William Henry Perrins, co-inventor of Worcestershire sauce, was born in Chaddesley Corbett.
- Ernest Perry, first-class cricketer, was born in Chaddesley Corbett.
- Elizabeth Verelst, née Bach (1700-c. 1761), of Chaddesley Corbett, mother of Harry Verelst, Governor of the Presidency of Bengal, 1767–1769.
- Jim Yardley was born in Chaddesley Corbett and played cricket for Chaddesley Corbett CC before going on to play first-class cricket for Worcestershire, and Northamptonshire.
