= Comin' Thro' the Rye =

1784 poem by Robert Burns

"Comin' Thro' the Rye" is a poem written in 1784 by Robert Burns (1759–1796). The words are put to the melody of the Scottish Minstrel "Common' Frae The Town". This is a variant of the tune to which "Auld Lang Syne" is usually sung—the melodic shape is almost identical, the difference lying in the tempo and rhythm.

It has a Roud Folk Song Index number of 13589.

== Origin and meaning ==
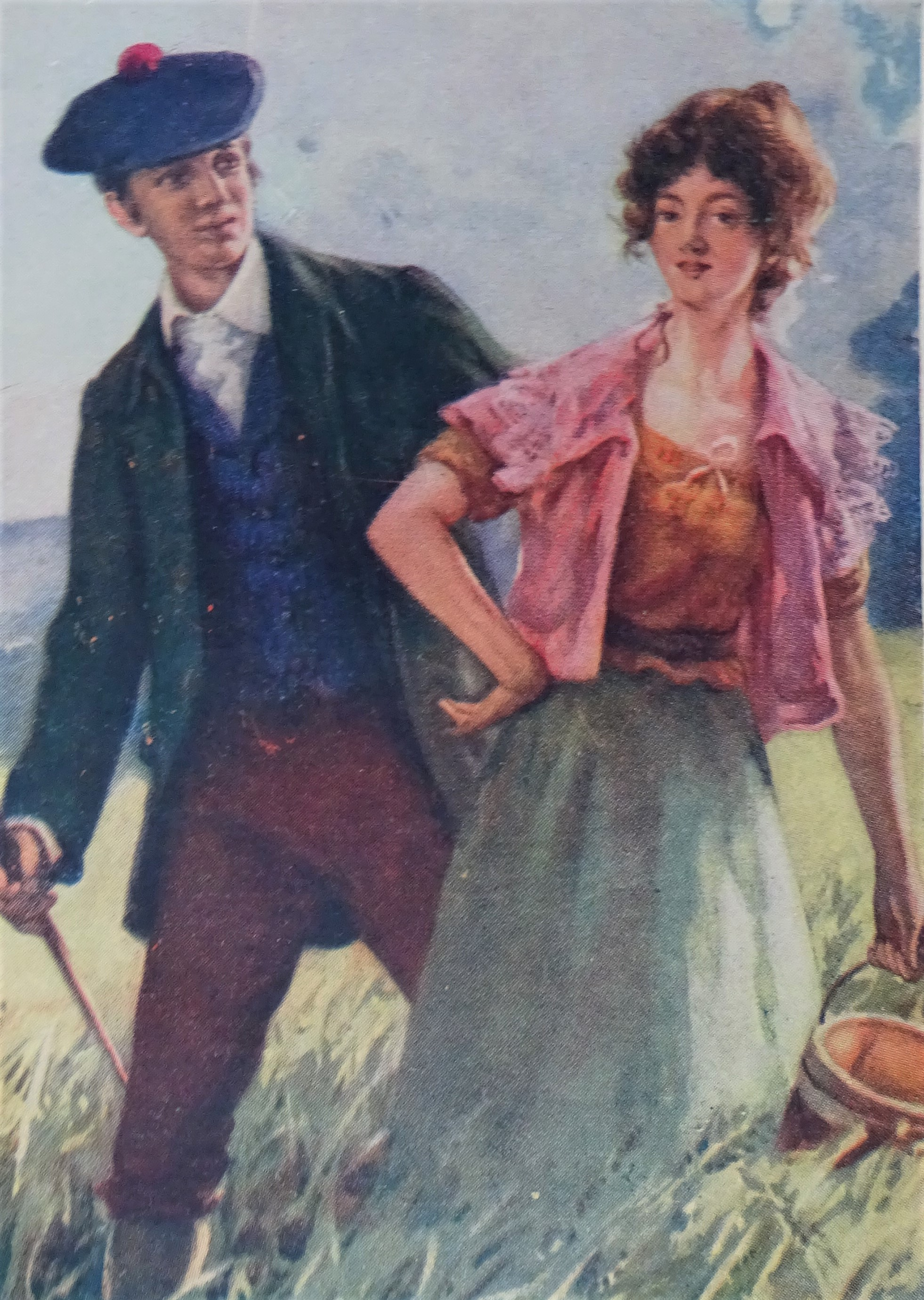
Illustration to "Comin' Thro' the Rye" (published in Poetical Works of Robert Burns, 1920)

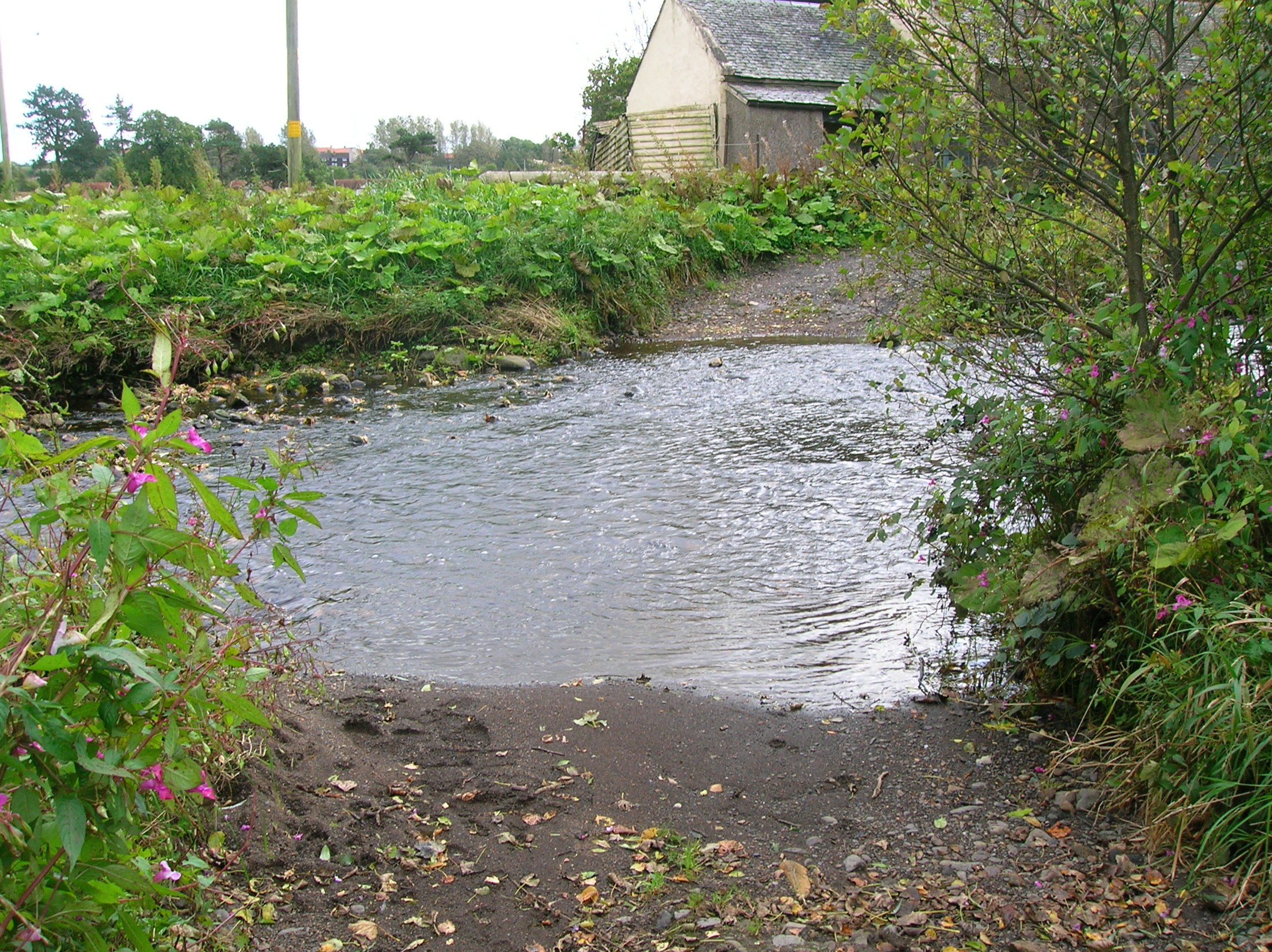
The ford across the Rye Water in Drakemyre, Dalry

G. W. Napier, in an 1876 Notes and Queries, wrote:

The original words of "Comin' thro' the rye" cannot be satisfactorily traced. There are many different versions of the song. The version which is now to be found in the Works of Burns is the one given in Johnson's Museum, which passed through the hands of Burns; but the song itself, in some form or other, was known long before Burns.

The protagonist, "Jenny", is not further identified, but there has been reference to a "Jenny from Dalry" and a longstanding legend in the Drakemyre suburb of the town of Dalry, North Ayrshire, holds that "comin thro' the rye" describes crossing a ford through the Rye Water at Drakemyre to the north of the town, downstream from Ryefield House and not far from the confluence of the Rye with the River Garnock. When this story appeared in the Glasgow Herald in 1867, it was soon disputed with the assertion that everyone understood the rye to be a field of rye, wet with dew, which also fits better with other stanzas that substitute "wheat" and "grain" for "rye". An alternative suggestion is that "the rye" was a long narrow cobblestone-paved lane, prone to puddles of water.

While the original poem is already full of sexual imagery, an alternative version makes this more explicit. It has a different chorus, referring to a phallic "staun o' staunin' graith" (roughly "an erection of astonishing size"), "kiss" is replaced by "fuck", and Jenny's "thing" in stanza four is identified as her "cunt".

== Burns' lyrics ==
Comin' Thro' the Rye
Tune for Comin' Thro' the Rye

O, Jenny's a' weet,^{[A]} poor body,
Jenny's seldom dry:
She draigl't^{[B]} a' her petticoatie,
Comin thro' the rye!

Chorus:
Comin thro' the rye, poor body,
Comin thro' the rye,
She draigl't a' her petticoatie,
Comin thro' the rye!

Gin^{[C]} a body meet a body
Comin thro' the rye,
Gin a body kiss a body,
Need a body cry?^{[D]}

(chorus)

Gin a body meet a body
Comin thro' the glen
Gin a body kiss a body,
Need the warl'^{[E]} ken?^{[F]}

(chorus)

Gin a body meet a body
Comin thro' the grain;
Gin a body kiss a body,
The thing's a body's ain.^{[G]}

(chorus)

- ^{A} weet – wet
- ^{B} draigl't – draggled
- ^{C} gin – given, in the sense of "if"
- ^{D} cry – call out [for help]
- ^{E} warl – world
- ^{F} ken – know
- ^{G} ain – own

== Lyrics usually sung ("Ilka lassie") ==
Even the "cleaner" version of the Burns lyrics is quite bawdy, and it is this one, or an "Anglicised" version of it, that is most commonly "covered".

Gin a body meet a body
Comin' thro' the rye
Gin a body kiss a body
Need a body cry?

Chorus:
Ilka lassie has her laddie
Nane, they say, hae I
Yet a' the lads they smile at me
When comin' thro' the rye.

Gin a body meet a body
Comin' frae the town
Gin a body kiss a body
Need a body frown?

(Chorus)

Gin a body meet a body,
Comin' frae the well,
Gin a body kiss a body,
Need a body tell?

(Chorus)

'Mang the train there is a swain
I dearly lo'e myself
But what his name or whaur his hame
I dinna care to tell

(Chorus)

== The Catcher in the Rye ==
The title of the novel The Catcher in the Rye (1951) by J. D. Salinger comes from the poem's name. Holden Caulfield, the protagonist, misremembers the line of the poem as, "if a body catch a body," rather than, "if a body meet a body." He keeps picturing children playing in a field of rye near the edge of a cliff, and himself catching them when they start to fall off.

== Cover versions ==
- The song was covered by many opera singers in the early years of recording, during the first two decades of the 20th century including Nellie Melba, Geraldine Farrar and Marcella Sembrich.
- The song is sung by Ava Gardner in the 1953 John Ford film Mogambo.
- Jo Stafford covered the song on her album Songs of Scotland.
- John C. Reilly sang the song on a special whiskey-themed episode of Bob Dylan's Theme Time Radio Hour in 2020.
- John Serry collaborated with the guitarist Tony Mottola and the Joe Biviano Accordion and Rhythm Sextette in a "Jazz Age" recording of the song for Sonora Records in 1946 (Accordion Capers, MS-476).

== See also ==
- "Korobeiniki", a Russian folk song that uses a similar bawdy allusion to rye.
