= Draycott (surname) =

Draycott is an English surname. Notable people with the surname include:

- Billy Draycott (1869–1943), English footballer
- Henry Draycott (c. 1510–1572), English-born Irish judge and politician
- Jane Draycott (born 1954), English poet
- Jane Draycott (archaeologist), British archaeologist and historian
- Philip Draycott (died 1559), English politician

== See also ==
- Anthony Draycot (died 1571), English Roman Catholic priest
