= Draffan =

Coordinates: 55.686°N 3.920°W

Draffan is a hamlet in South Lanarkshire, Scotland, located 4 miles (6.4 km) southeast of Larkhall and 1-mile (1.6 km) east of the M74 motorway.
