= Drayford =

Village in Devon, England

Coordinates: 50°54′39″N 3°44′07″W

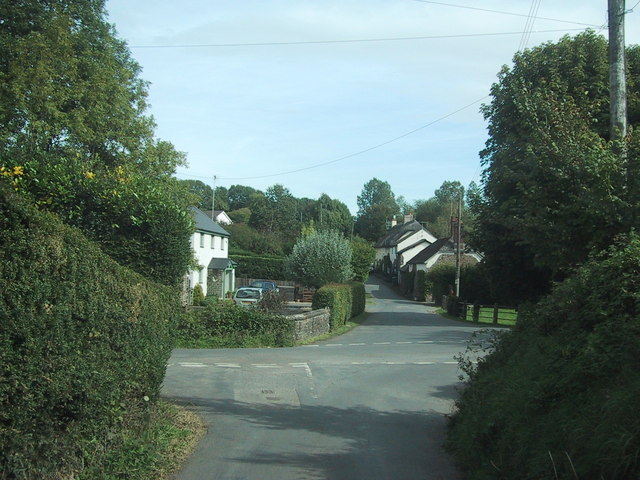
Road junction in Drayford

Drayford is a hamlet in the English county of Devon, approximately 15 miles north west of Exeter.
