= Drub, West Yorkshire =

Hamlet in West Yorkshire, England

Coordinates: 53.7387°N 1.7025°W

Drub
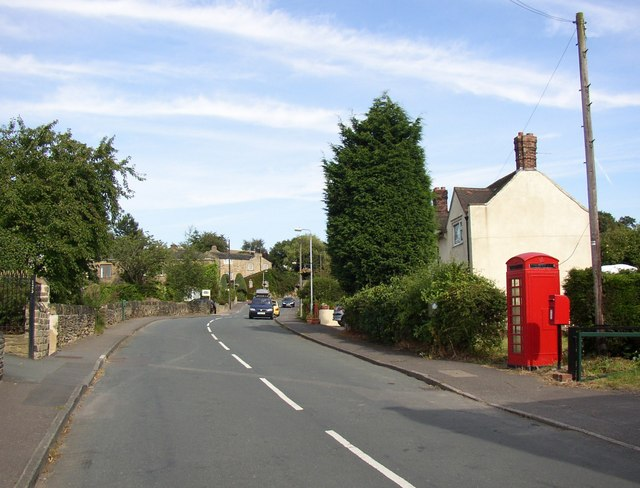
- Drub Lane leading through the settlement

- Location within West Yorkshire
- Metropolitan borough: Kirklees
- Metropolitan county: West Yorkshire
- Region: Yorkshire and the Humber
- Country: England
- Sovereign state: United Kingdom

Drub is a hamlet in the Kirklees district, in the county of West Yorkshire, England. It is located between Cleckheaton, Birkenshaw, and Gomersal and is considered part of the latter. The name "Drub" derives from rubbish found in coal, was transported which was the former function of Drub Lane as a thoroughfare.
