= Drakemyre, North Ayrshire =

Coordinates: 55.7162°N 4.7219°W

Drakemyre
- Location within North Ayrshire
- OS grid reference: NS29115 50338
- Council area: North Ayrshire
- Lieutenancy area: Ayrshire and Arran
- Country: Scotland
- Sovereign state: United Kingdom
- Post town: DALRY
- Postcode district: KA24
- Dialling code: 01294
- Police: Scotland
- Fire: Scottish
- Ambulance: Scottish
- UK Parliament: North Ayrshire and Arran
- Scottish Parliament: Cunninghame North

Drakemyre or Drakemire was once a distinct village on the Rye Water in North Ayrshire, Parish of Dalry, Scotland. The settlement on the B780 road to Kilbirnie has become incorporated as a suburb within the town of Dalry.

== History ==
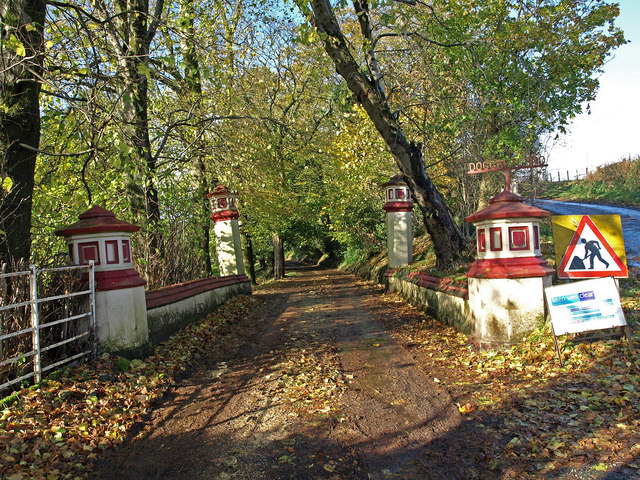
The entrance to Doggartland House at Drakemyre.

In the 1870s it was recorded as forming a northern suburb of Dalry with woollen manufactories such as Doggartland Mill and a population of 325.

The cottages of Fordmouth record that a ford on the Rye Water existed until a bridge was built nearby at Bridge End.

The 'Trades Hotel' was a lodging house where itinerant workers could stay for sixpence a night.

"By Drakemyre we descend - see the claith-spread enclosure
Emblazoned by very bright colour and dye;
Saint Margaret hersel' ne'er displayed
sic braw dresses As are worn ilka day by the wives of Dalry".

Andrew Aitken 1873

The old village of Burnside lies slightly further north and once had the school that served the area.

=== Doggartland House ===
Doggartland House at Drakemyre may derive its name from 'Dogger' which is Scots for a course ironstone, much mined in the area as witnessed by waste bings below Ryefield and at Flashwood. An impressive, but now largely redundant cast iron bridge crosses the Rye Water within the grounds of Doggartland House. This bridge has very elaborate cast-iron balustrades and the nearby house has been described as 'Italianate' and the driveway is guarded by two pairs of quirky gatepiers, one tall and the other small, octagonal with panels at the top (See photograph).

Doggartland Farm was the property of the Blair Estate in the 1870s. The name element 'Doggart' is recorded as 'Douat' by Timothy Pont in the early 17th century.

=== Ryefield House ===
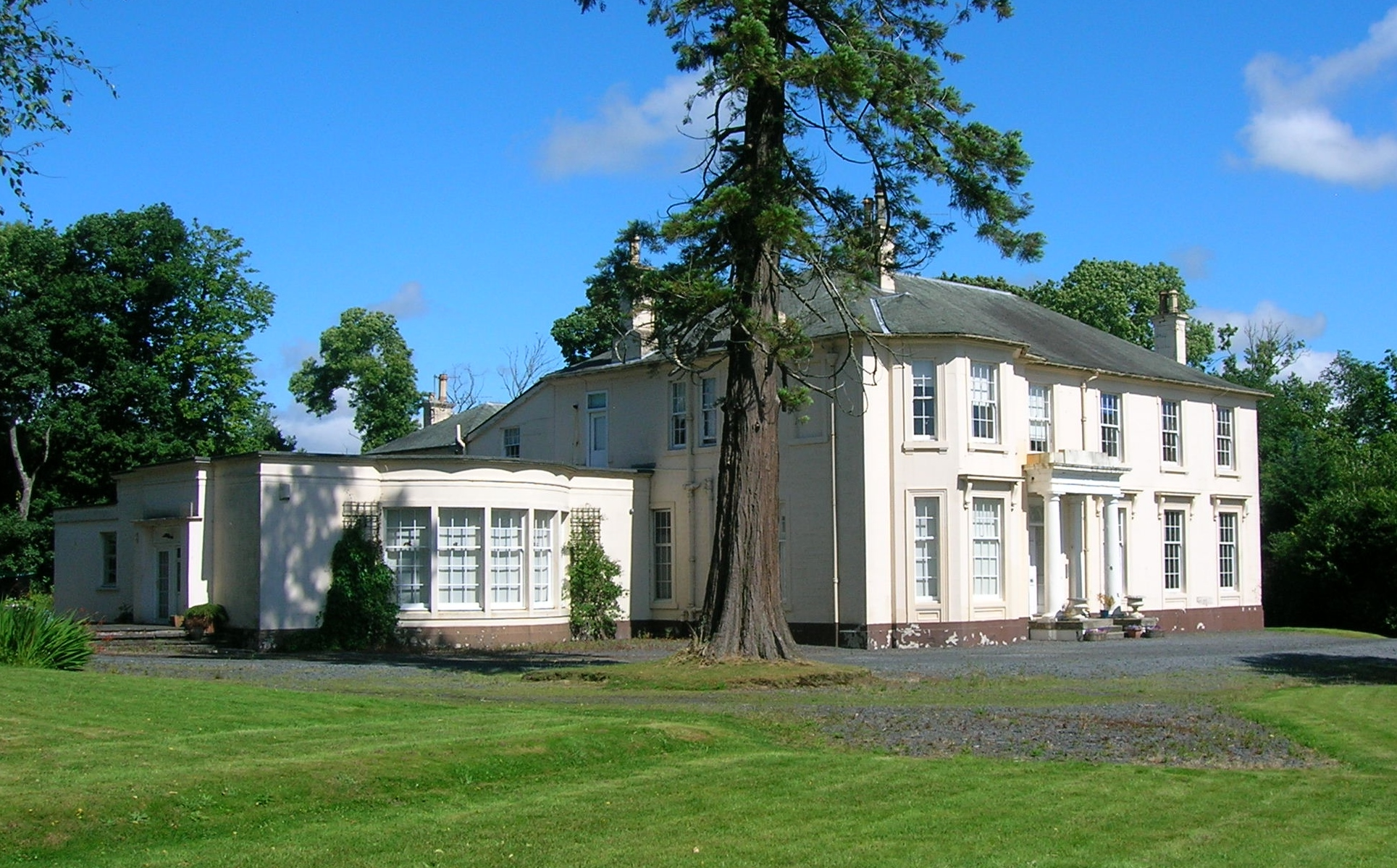
Ryefield House.

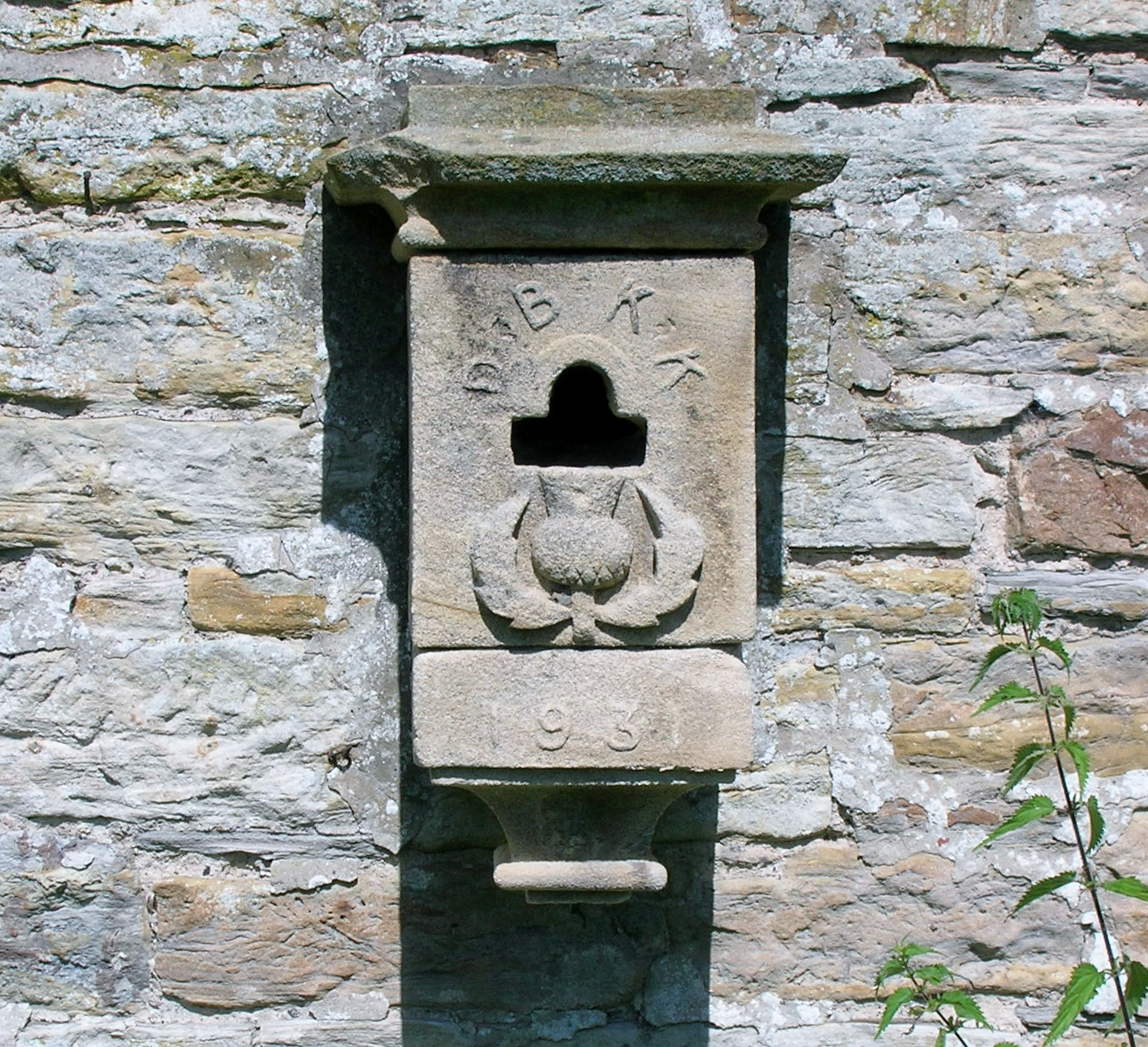
Possible water spout feature

Ryefield House was described as "almost new" in 1851 and the estate possessed a fine 'U-shaped' stable block with a courtyard to the east of the mansion house as well as a large walled garden to the west. The mansion house is of a classical style, built of ashlar with a Doric porch and in the 1920s a single storey ballroom was added, also used as an art gallery by William Barr Knox. William first married Gladys Burrell, a niece of Sir William Burrell the Scottish shipping merchant and philanthropist, made famous through the Burrell Collection. Edith Dunlop of Strathaven was the second wife of William Barr Knox, he is buried in Largs, however a commemorative plaque is also present at the Knox family memorial in Kilbirne 'Auld Kirk' cemetery where he is recorded as being of 'Redheugh and Ryefield'. His daughter was named Diana.

The mansion house is now divided up into flats and the stable block is a private dwelling. The original entrance drive entering from the west was abandoned when a waggonway was laid along the lane that had provided access, forcing a new entrance to be created that branches off near the back of Doggartland Mill.

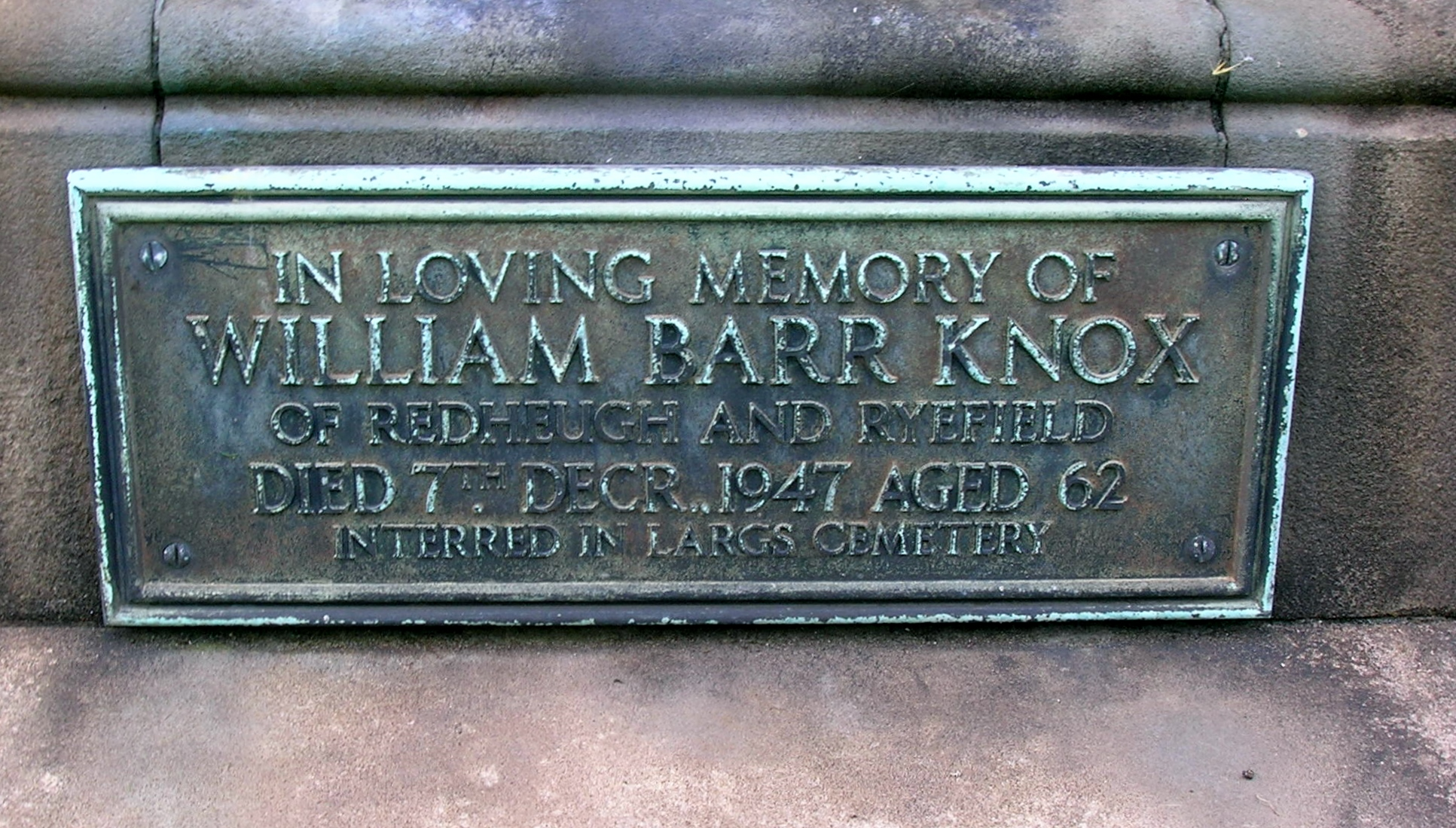
Plaque to William Barr Knox at Kilbirnie.

The walled garden survives, but without the previous ornate garden and central pond that once lay within. A marriage stone with the date '1786' and the initials 'JK' paired with 'WM' has been incorporated into the inside of one wall of the walled garden, presumably originating from an early dwelling house belonging to the Knox family, such as 'Redheugh' in Kilbirnie, childhood home of William Barr Knox. 'wBk 1924' (William Barr Knox) is carved on a panel above the keystone above the entrance that faces the house. 'DB KK 1931' is carved on a probable fountain spout near the shelter on the western end of the walled garden. A pair of finely carved ornate stone features project from the arches that front the old shelter or summer house. The remains of another summerhouse overlooks the site of the old tennis court as shown on OS maps.

== Local Industry ==
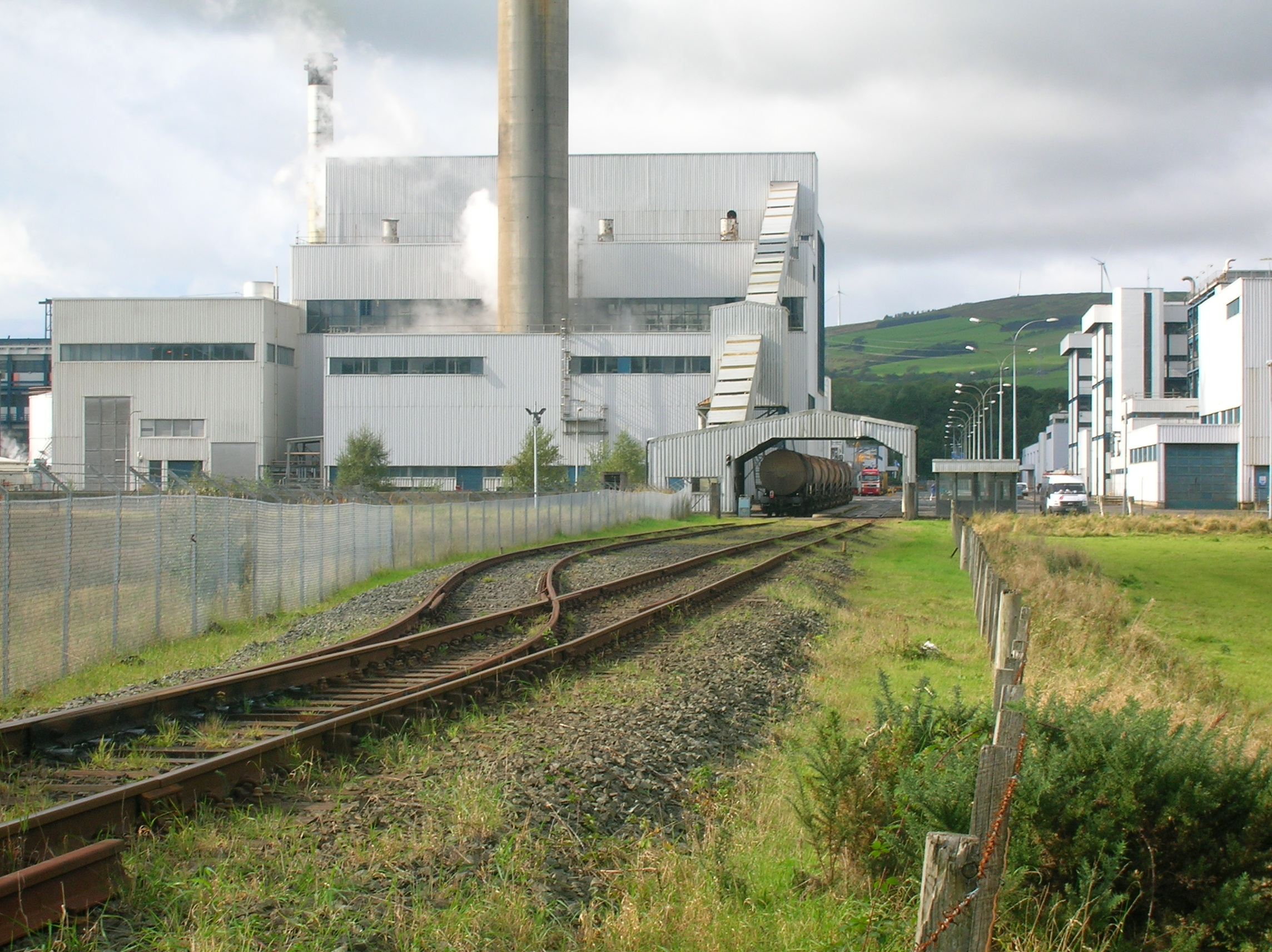
The rail connection to the DSM plant

A print works is shown above Doggartland in 1856, ironstone pits and their associated refuse tips were present at Hillend and Ryesholm, and a coal pit was also located at Ryesholm with an extensive network of mineral lines in the area.

Doggartland Mill was a woollen mill that was supplied with water power via the Rye Water and a series of lades and millponds. This mill was disused by 1909. In 1895 a large woollen mill lay on the eastern side of the Rye Water at Ryeside near Fordmouth, this was disused by 1938 and the old Doggartland had become a dye works.

Roche built a chemical works at Ryesholm in 1957 to manufacture Vitamins B1 and B5, and in subsequent expansion also produced a range of chemicals. The factory was enlarged in 1983 to become a major producer of Vitamin C. In 2003 Roche focussed on its healthcare products, and sold its chemical interests, including the Ryeholm works, to the Netherlands-based multinational DSM, which concentrated vitamin C production at Ryeholm and closed its works in the United States. In 2014 DSM disclosed plans to expand its already large vitamin and chemicals manufacturing in China, and there were concerns about the future of the Ryeholm works. DSM also has UK factories at Heanor in Derbyshire and Belfast.

== Association with Robert Burns ==
As stated, the Rye Water had a ford below Ryefield House which has been linked with the song "Comin' Thro' the Rye" collected by Robert Burns:-

"Gin a body meet a body Comin’ through the Rye,
Gin a body kiss a body Need a body cry ?,
Ilka lassie has her laddie, Nane, they say, ha’e I !
Yet a’ the lads they smile on me,
When comin’ through the Rye."

== Micro-history ==
Stepping stones once crossed the Rye Water near the cottages at Fordmouth.
