= Drayton (surname) =

Drayton is a surname. Notable people with the surname include:

== Academia ==
- Harold Drayton (1929–2018), Guyanese academic
- Richard Drayton (born 1964), Guyana-born historian

== Military ==
- Percival Drayton (1812–1865), United States Navy officer, son of US Representative William Drayton of South Carolina
- Thomas Drayton (1809–1899), Confederate States Army general, son of US Representative William Drayton of South Carolina

== Performing arts ==
- Charley Drayton (born 1965), American drummer, multi-instrumentalist, and producer – grandson of jazz bassist Charlie Drayton
- Charlie Drayton (1919–1953), American jazz bassist
- Clay Drayton (born 1947), American songwriter and record producer
- Paul Drayton (composer), English musician
- Poppy Drayton (born 1991), English actress
- Flavor Flav (born William J. Drayton in 1959), American rap artist

== Public service and law ==
- J. Coleman Drayton (1852–1934), American lawyer and socialite, first husband of Charlotte Augusta Astor
- John Drayton (1766–1822), American politician, governor of South Carolina
- Joy Drayton (1916–2012), New Zealand teacher and politician
- William Drayton (1776–1846), American politician, US Representative from South Carolina
- William Henry Drayton (1742–1779), American lawyer, South Carolina delegate to Continental Congress
- William Drayton Sr. (1733–1790), American lawyer and judge

== Sports ==
- Jerome Drayton (1945–2025), Canadian long-distance runner
- Maurice Drayton (born 1976), American football coach
- Paul Drayton (athlete) (1939–2010), American athlete, gold medal winner at the 1964 Summer Olympics

== Other professions ==
- Bill Drayton (born 1943), American social entrepreneur and environmentalist
- Dean Drayton (born 1941), Australian church leader
- Michael Drayton (1563–1631), English poet
