= Draycott, Worcestershire =

Hamlet in Worcestershire, England

Coordinates: 52.13011°N 2.21616°W

Draycott
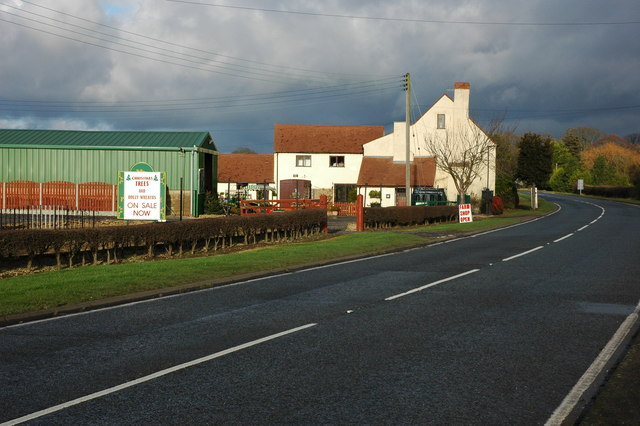
- Hartland's Nursery

- Location within Worcestershire
- OS grid reference: SO853480
- Civil parish: Kempsey
- District: Malvern Hills
- Shire county: Worcestershire
- Region: West Midlands
- Country: England
- Sovereign state: United Kingdom

Draycott is a hamlet in the English county of Worcestershire.

It is located on the A38 road due south of the city of Worcester. It forms part of the civil parish of Kempsey and the Malvern Hills district. Kempsey parish had a population of 4,358 in 2021.

== Etymology ==
Draycott's name comes from the phrase 'cottages by the dræg'. A 'dræg' is a small anchor with four arms.
