= Drawbridge, Cornwall =

Hamlet in England

Coordinates: 50.458°N 4.594°W

Drawbridge: Cornish: Ponsdrayl
- Location within Cornwall
- OS grid reference: SX160652
- Civil parish: St Neot
- Unitary authority: Cornwall
- Ceremonial county: Cornwall
- Region: South West
- Country: England
- Sovereign state: United Kingdom
- Post town: Liskeard
- Postcode district: PL14 6

Drawbridge (Cornish: Ponsdrayl) is a hamlet in the parish of St Neot (where the 2011 census was included), Cornwall, England, UK.
