= Drayton, Worcestershire =

Coordinates: 52.3824°N 2.1388°W

Drayton
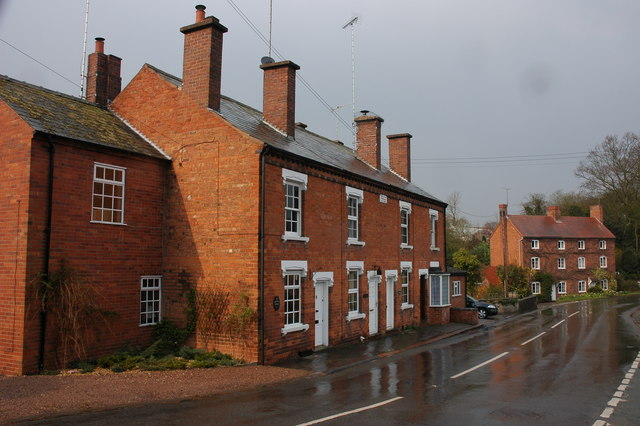

- Location within Worcestershire
- OS grid reference: SO906760
- District: Wyre Forest
- Shire county: Worcestershire
- Region: West Midlands
- Country: England
- Sovereign state: United Kingdom
- Post town: Stourbridge
- Postcode district: DY9
- Police: West Mercia
- Fire: Hereford and Worcester
- Ambulance: West Midlands

Drayton is a hamlet in Worcestershire, England which remains part of the ecclesiastical parish of Chaddesley Corbett, which from its select vestry formed a civil parish and which also continues. The population of the Chaddesley Corbett parish was 1,491 in 2021.

Belne Brook, which originates in the Clent Hills and is a tributary of the River Stour, flows equally through Belbroughton immediately upstream and through Drayton.

== History ==
Charcoal and water-powered forges were a major feature in the area, the water used to turn sharpening wheels for scythe-making. There was once a water-mill here: there is still a mill-pond, a mill building (which now houses local businesses) and 19th century terraced housing, all of which is evidence of the former industry.
