= Leamington Hastings =

Village in Warwickshire, England

Coordinates: 52.303425°N 1.347302°W

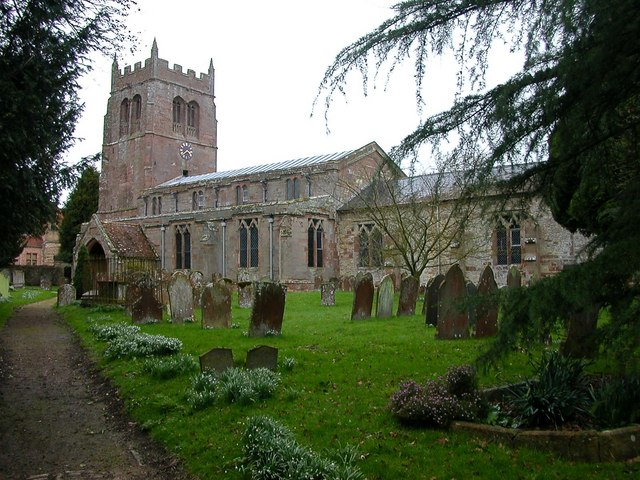
- All Saints' parish church, Leamington Hastings

- Location within Warwickshire
- Population: 466 (2021 census)
- OS grid reference: SP4467
- Civil parish: Leamington Hastings
- District: Rugby
- Shire county: Warwickshire
- Region: West Midlands
- Country: England
- Sovereign state: United Kingdom
- Post town: RUGBY
- Postcode district: CV23
- Dialling code: 01926
- Police: Warwickshire
- Fire: Warwickshire
- Ambulance: West Midlands
- UK Parliament: Kenilworth and Southam

Leamington Hastings is a small village and larger civil parish in Warwickshire, England. The civil parish covers Leamington Hastings itself, plus the nearby hamlets of Broadwell, Hill and Kites Hardwick. Its population in the 2011 census was 440, increasing slightly to 466 at the 2021 census.

== Village ==
The village is about 7 miles (11 km) south-west of Rugby and west of the A426 road between Rugby and Southam. To the north of the village is the Draycote Water reservoir. Administratively, Leamington Hastings forms part of the Borough of Rugby.

The name of the village is due to it being just south of the River Leam, and the 'Hastings' part is due to the 'Hastang' family, the medieval lords of the manor.

The village contains the historic Church of All Saints and some preserved 17th-century almshouses, which date from 1608, but were extensively restored during 1980-81.

The Christopher Saxton map of Warwickshire (1637 edition) includes a curious transposition: Leamington Hastings appears as Lemington priors, and what is now called Leamington Spa, or Royal Leamington Spa, appears as Lemington hastings.

The first mention of a post office in Leamington Hastings was in September 1845, when a type of postmark known as an undated circular handstamp was issued. The village post office closed in May 1979.

Leamington Hastings Infant School is located in the village.

== Notable residents ==
The Victorian philosopher Richard Congreve was born at Leamington Hastings.

A branch of the Sitwell family lived at Leamington Hastings, where they had inherited their holdings from a Wheler heiress. Edward Sacheverell Wilmot was lord of the manor from 1801 to 1819. From them the later Wilmot-Sitwell family of Horsley, Derbyshire descended.

Rev. Degge Wilmot Sitwell, who lived at The Manor House at Leamington Hastings, served as vicar of the church. His grandson was Major General Hervey Degge Wilmot Sitwell, born in 1896, who served as General Officer commanding the British troops on Java in 1942, when he was captured by Japanese forces and spent the next three years in Japanese prisoner of war camps. He was made a Companion of the Order of the Bath in 1946. From 1953 until 1968 he was Keeper of the Jewel House in London.
