= Kites Hardwick =

Hamlet in Warwickshire, England

Coordinates: 52.310°N 1.313°W

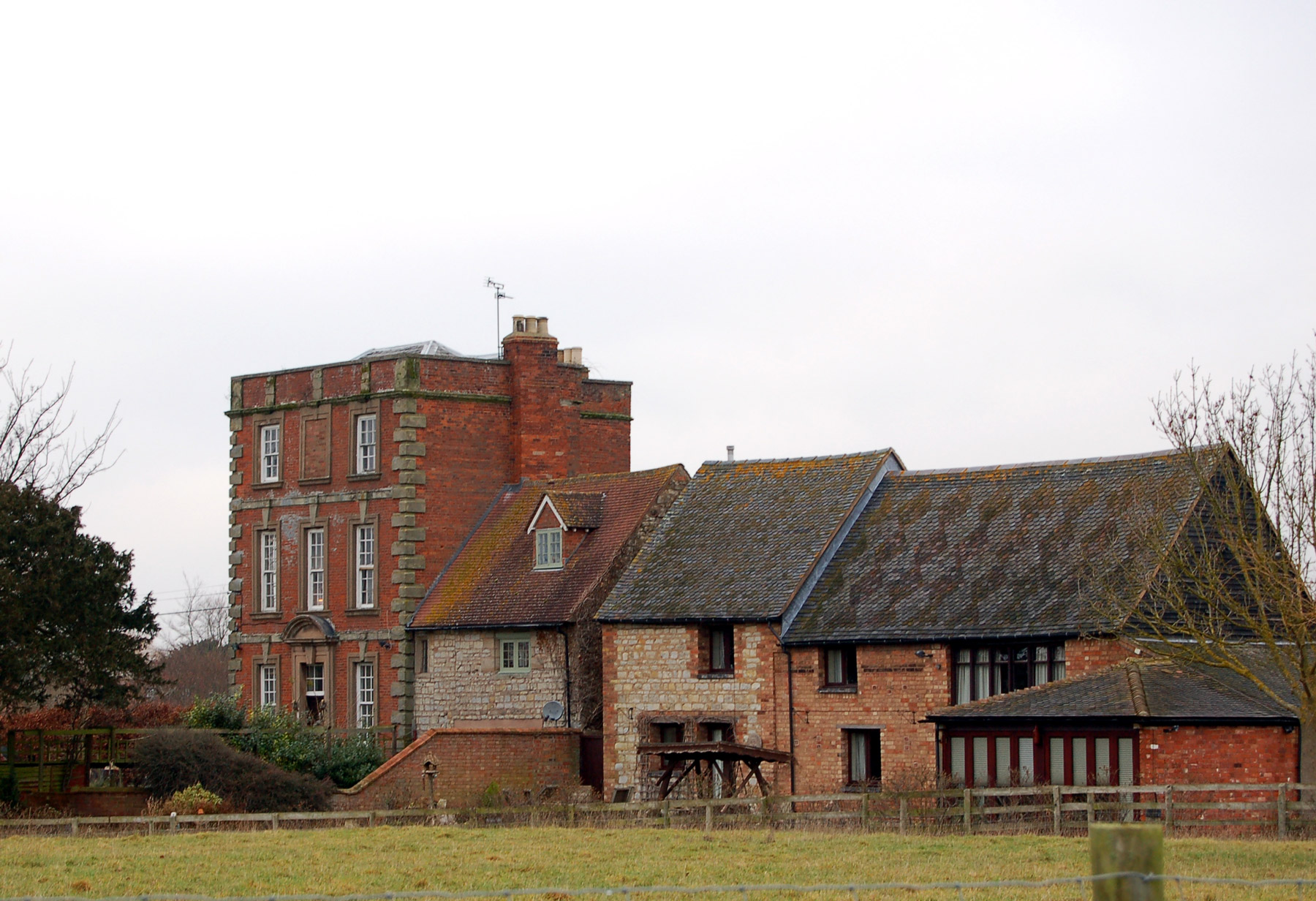
The Grade II listed Georgian Manor at Kites Hardwick

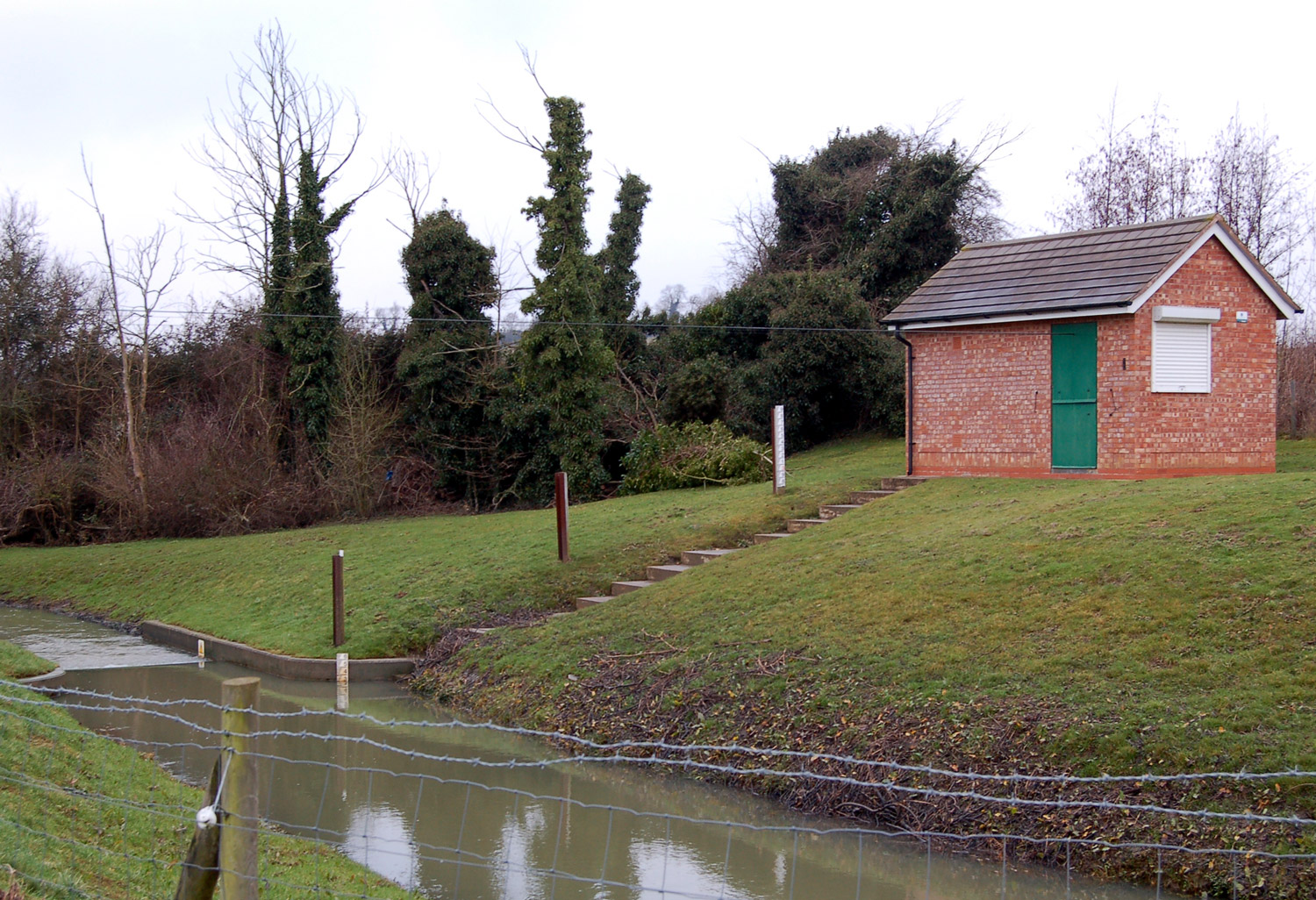
The Severn Trent Water gauging station on the River Leam at Kites Hardwick

Kites Hardwick is a hamlet in east Warwickshire, England, in the Leam Valley ward of Rugby Borough and in the civil parish of Leamington Hastings

== Hamlet ==
The hamlet straddles the A426 Rugby to Southam road two miles (3 km) south of Dunchurch. It lies in the valley of the River Leam which passes under the A426 at Thurlaston Bridge, just north of Kites Hardwick. This spot was the location of frequent flooding of the road until in 2001 the Environment Agency constructed a gauging station immediately west of the bridge with associated works to ease the flow of the river.

Kites Hardwick takes the second part of its name from the Herdewyk family (who are mentioned in the Domesday Book and throughout the late Middle Ages): there are numerous references to the family (also spelled Herdwych and Herdewic) in medieval records from the midlands of England. It is less clear where the first part of the village's name originates but it may refer to red kites, a bird of prey common in England until the 19th century. Kites Hardwick was a manor in its own right, separate from the manor of Leamington Hastings. The first mention of the manor is in 1236, when Robert Hastang (whose family gives the name to Leamington Hastings) went to law against William de Herdewic regarding customs and services owed. By the 16th century, the manor was known as Hardwick Grimbald.

Leamington Hastings parish is entirely rural farming and Kites Hardwick remains an agricultural settlement. According to L. F. Salzman's History of the County of Warwick an early-17th-century document states: The glebe land of Ougham and Westcroft (in Kites Hardwick) was capable of supporting 10 milch cows besides 'rearers' and two or three hundred sheep, and also contained 4 yard land of corn and hay Today, there is a mix of livestock (mostly sheep) and arable farming. However, Salzman records that much of the arable land had once been pasture; this seems borne out as late as 1853 in a reference by RS Surtees to: ... the wide-stretching grazing grounds of Southam and Dunchurch.

A ewe from the Manor Farm flock of Southdown sheep won Reserve Supreme Champion for Kites Hardwick farmer John Goode at the Royal Show at Stoneleigh in 2000. Manor Farm is on the east side of the A426 road and is architecturally the most notable of the farms in the village. The house is a three-storey early Georgian red brick house with stone dressings and has been Grade II listed since December 1951. Kites Hardwick is served by a bus service running between Rugby and Leamington Spa although most residents have cars. The speed limit through the village was 60 mph but was recently reduced to 50 mph although, unusually, the police objected to the lowering of the limit. A golf driving range was constructed on agricultural land just north of the village in 1992. It now operates as Leam Valley Golf Centre and provides a 14-bay range which is floodlit at night, a nine-hole golf course and putting greens.

Draycote Water lies north of the village. It is operated by Severn Trent Water as a domestic water storage reservoir. It was opened in 1970 and holds up to 5,000,000,000 imperial gallons (22,700,000 m^{3}) of water. The reservoir sits beside and above the River Leam and water is pumped up from the river during the winter. Draycote supplies nearby Rugby by pipe and can also feed water back into the River Leam to supply the Leamington Spa area. There is a visitor centre, a sailing club and the reservoir is popular with walkers, birdwatchers and anglers. Kites Hardwick was once more of village status, with 3 pubs. They drank beer because of the lack of clean water. It is said that the people of Kites Hardwick were very drunk. The people who lived there were wiped out by the Black Death (the plague) in the 15th century. Kites Hardwick is also known as Kytes Hardwick.
