= Hill, Warwickshire =

Hamlet in Warwickshire, England

Coordinates: 52.29926°N 1.33714°W

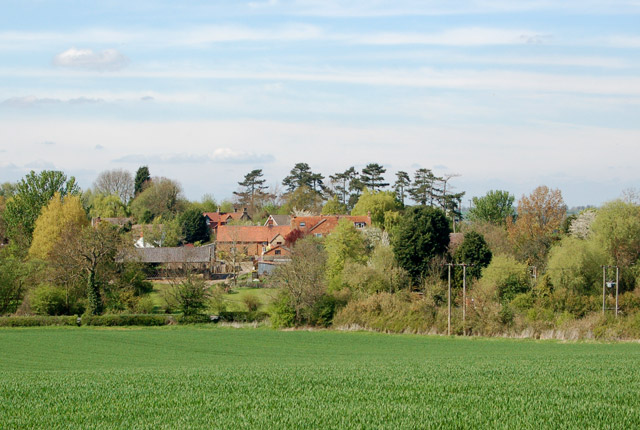
View of Hill from footpath

Hill is a hamlet in the civil parish of Leamington Hastings and the borough of Rugby, in Warwickshire, England. The hamlet is between Leamington Hastings and the A426 road from Rugby to Southam.
