= Bourton-on-Dunsmore =

Village in Warwickshire, England

Coordinates: 52.329823°N 1.361149°W

Bourton on Dunsmore
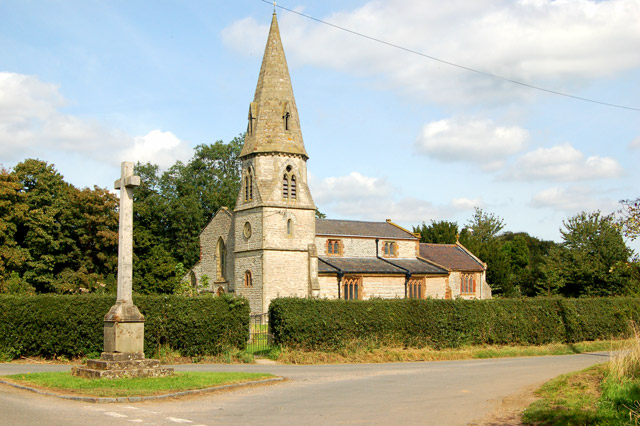
- Church of St Peter and war memorial, Bourton-on-Dunsmore

- Location within Warwickshire
- OS grid reference: SP4370
- Civil parish: Bourton and Draycote
- District: Rugby
- Shire county: Warwickshire
- Region: West Midlands
- Country: England
- Sovereign state: United Kingdom
- Post town: RUGBY
- Postcode district: CV23
- Police: Warwickshire
- Fire: Warwickshire
- Ambulance: West Midlands

Bourton-on-Dunsmore is a small village in Warwickshire, England. It is within the civil parish of Bourton and Draycote, along with the nearby hamlet of Draycote.

Bourton is part of the borough of Rugby and is located around 5 miles (8.0 km) south-west of the town of Rugby, just south of the B4453 road. Bourton is located upon a ridge of high ground overlooking the Draycote Water reservoir. A short distance to the east, downhill of Bourton is the hamlet of Draycote, and a short distance west is the village of Frankton.

Bourton-on-Dunsmore was mentioned in the Domesday Book of 1086. The village church of St Peter dates to the 13th century, but was mostly rebuilt in the 19th century, it is now grade II listed.

In the village is the grade II listed Bourton Hall; a large stone mansion house which dates from 1791, with later additions. It once had gardens designed by Harold Peto, but had fallen into dereliction by the early-1980s. It was restored, and for many years was the headquarters of the development charity Practical Action (formerly known as Intermediate Technology). In 2019 the hall was bought by a company who sought to convert it into a luxury wedding venue. In 2021 the company was fined for carrying out renovation work to the hall without planning permission.

== Notable people ==
- Arthur Robert Kenney-Herbert (1840–1916), a Colonel and food writer; born in Bourton-on-Dunsmore
