= Toft, Warwickshire =

Hamlet in Warwickshire, England

Coordinates: 52.33141°N 1.29850°W

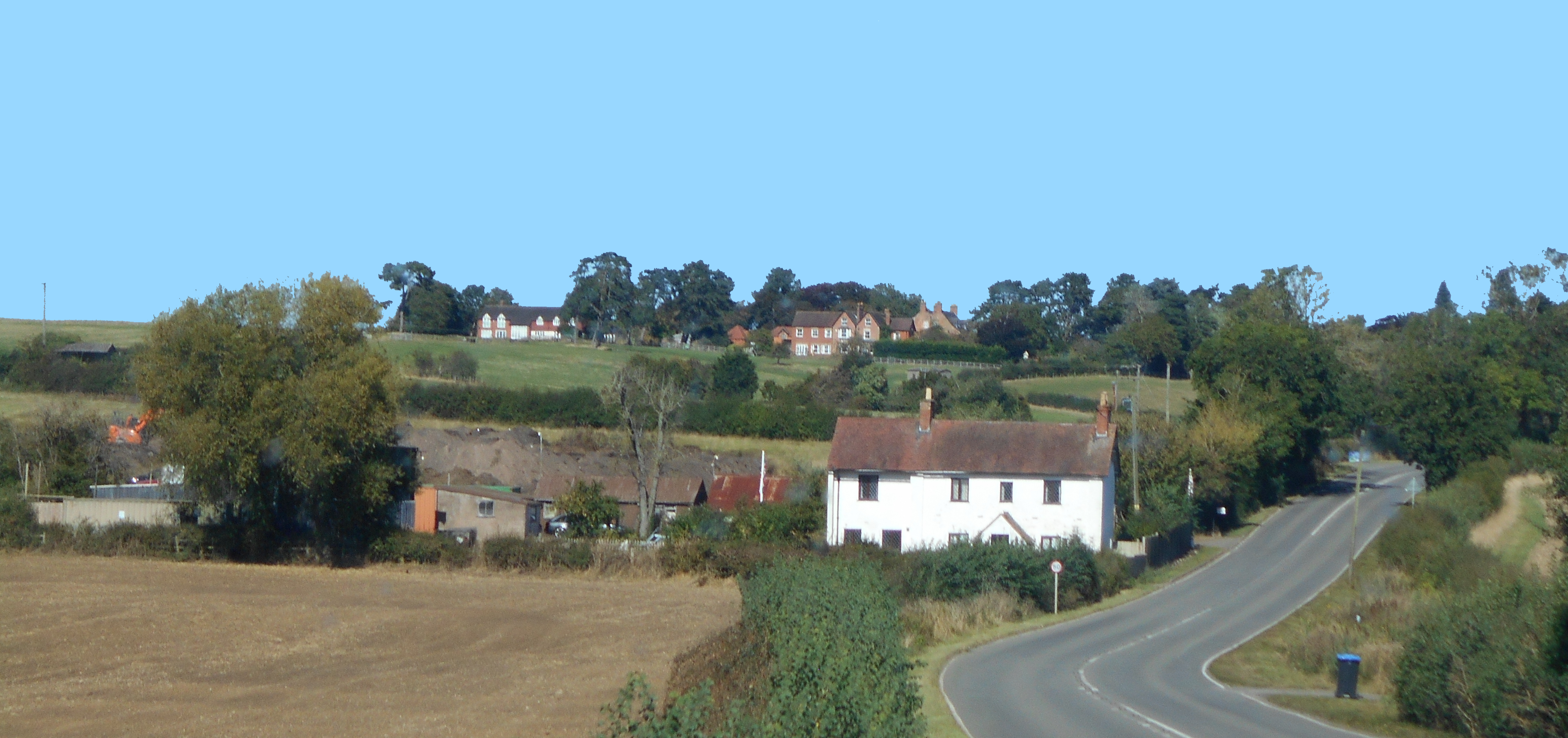
Toft seen from the A426 road

Toft is a small hamlet in the county of Warwickshire, England, just south of, and within the civil parish of Dunchurch, just off the A426 road and south of the M45 motorway. To the west Toft overlooks Draycote Water (a modern reservoir), across which lies the village of Thurlaston. The hamlet was first mentioned in the 15th century. It sits on a hill known as Toft Hill.

== Alpaca farming ==
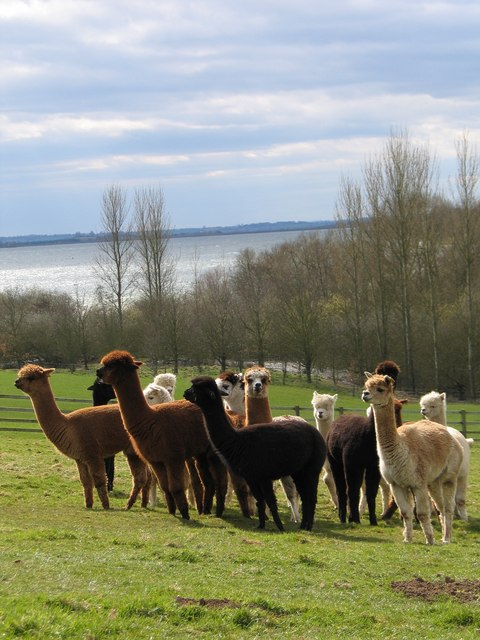
Alpacas at Toft

The fields around Toft are home to a herd of around 150 alpacas, which are native to South America. The animals are bred for their wool and as pets by Toft Alpacas, which is based at Toft Manor. Alpaca farming was started locally in 1997, when the retired theatre director Rob Bettinson and wife Shirley moved to Toft Manor and bought their first four alpacas.
