= Bourton and Draycote =

Civil parish in Warwickshire, England

Coordinates: 52.327°N 1.355°W

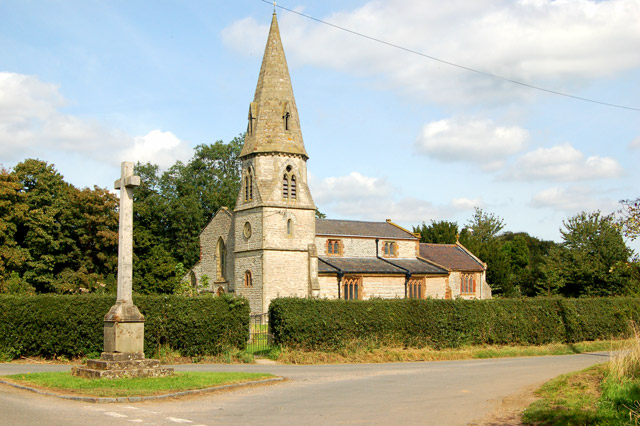
- Bourton-on-Dunsmore

- Location within Warwickshire
- Population: 275 (2011 census)
- Civil parish: Bourton and Draycote
- District: Rugby
- Shire county: Warwickshire
- Region: West Midlands
- Country: England
- Sovereign state: United Kingdom
- Police: Warwickshire
- Fire: Warwickshire
- Ambulance: West Midlands

Bourton and Draycote is a civil parish in the Rugby borough of Warwickshire, England which consists of the villages of Bourton-on-Dunsmore and Draycote. Of these, Bourton is the larger. In the 2001 Census the parish had a population of 231, increasing to 275 at the 2011 Census, decreasing slightly to 271 at the 2021 Census.
