= Southam Heritage Collection =

Coordinates: 52.25328°N 1.38807°W

- Housed at: Southam, Warwickshire, England
- Curators: Friends of the Cardall Collection

The Southam Heritage Collection contains artefacts, documents, and photographs relating to the history of the town of Southam, Warwickshire, England, including its people, and the surrounding villages.

Since its inception in 2006, the Collection was managed by a team of volunteers under the name of The Friends of the Cardall Collection. Members of the Friends are interested in the history of Southam and its surrounding villages. More recently the Collection has become a Registered Charity (No 1173033) in England and Wales and is now governed by a small committee of Trustees and a larger Management Committee under the new name of the Southam Heritage Collection.

The Collection is based in two of the Community Rooms located in Tithe Place, High Street, Southam. Access to the Exhibition Room is through the main entrance to Tithe Place, opposite the Southam Library in the Atrium. The second Community Room is used for storage of Collection items and for project related work. Access to the Exhibition Room is viable for people with disabilities since it is located on the ground floor with no steps and wide doors. In addition to the Southam Library, there is also a café open during normal daytime hours plus public toilets including one with baby changing facilities and disabled access.

== Background ==
The collection was started by the late Jack Cardall, and his widow, Rene, continued this work until her death in 2007. It contains in excess of 7,500 items. In addition, there is a photographic archive, largely donated by a local historian, that contains over 1,500 unique negatives and slides, and 450 unique glass negatives taken by an amateur photographer in the early days of the 20th century.

Southam is a historic market town in Warwickshire, England, and has many unique and ancient buildings. Located on major north–south and east–west routes, it was for many years a bustling transport and trading hub, particularly in the era before railways.

== Current projects ==
The volunteers help by identifying, recording and describing all items, creating a computer database of items, scanning all documents, photographing all objects and digitising all photographic material.

They are working with local schools and colleges, retirement homes and similar organisations, organise "Walk & Talk" events and host presentations for local groups, exhibitions and displays. They are in partnership with local artists, Southam Fire Service and Southam Primary Schools. The oral history includes digitally recording information and memories of local people and they sell oral history CDs. They introduce exchange students visiting Southam to the town. They are now creating a television documentary about one of Southam's historic buildings. and historians

Currently they are expanding, engaging awareness and widening the access of the Collection to the general public, they are hoping to encourage young people to get more involved in the Collection via the internet and social media and also assisting local schools with local history studies. The Collection is aiming to increase tourism and trade in the town.

== Funding and support ==
The Friends of Southam's Cardall Collection receives support from the Warwickshire Community Museum's Officer, including advice, training and information about funding opportunities. The work of the Friends is funded by donations, membership subscriptions, sales of small items, and small grants from awarding bodies. The Group has had some success with applications for small grants for specific projects. Computer equipment, scanners, lighting equipment, projectors, etc. have been acquired to support community work and to carry out the conservation work that underpins the group's activities. However, to pay for running costs (rent, rates, electricity, water,) volunteers also have to concentrate on revenue earning projects.

== Recent developments ==
In September 2025, the Southam Heritage Collection published a new book titled "Southam – The Timeline of a Warwickshire Market Town". The book, researched and written by volunteers Richard Clarke and Dr Roland Raffell, presents the town’s history in chronological order, from its earliest known settlement through to the modern era. It includes nearly 80 illustrations and photographs, many in colour, and aims to provide both residents and visitors with a readable account of Southam’s development.

The charity continues to build community engagement through exhibitions, talks and educational activities. It works with local schools, artists and community groups to promote awareness of Southam’s heritage and encourage wider access to its collections. Volunteers also mount window displays and temporary exhibitions in the atrium of Tithe Place, illustrating aspects of local history and inviting contributions from visitors and partner organisations.
