= Stanford Reservoir =

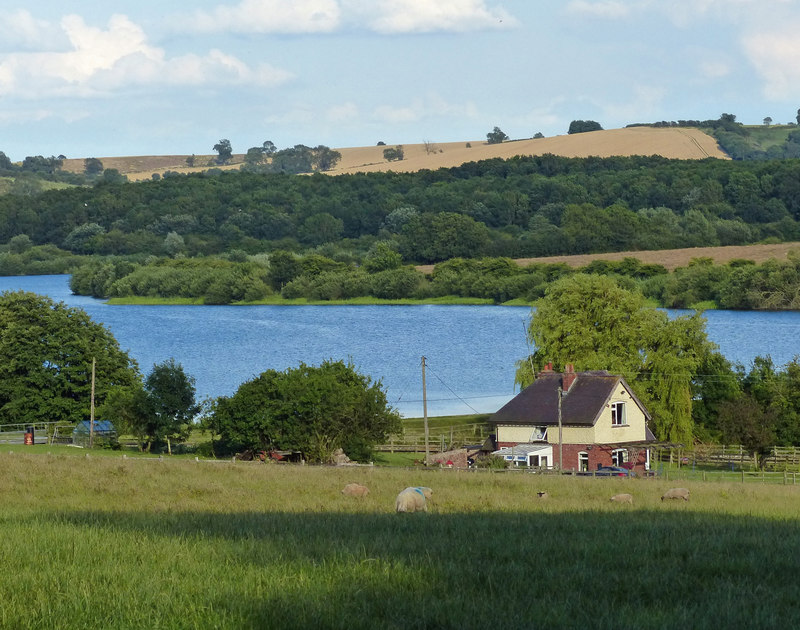
- Stanford Reservoir

- Location of the Stanford Reservoir in England
- Location: England
- Coordinates: 52°25′15″N 1°6′55″W
- Lake type: reservoir
- Primary inflows: River Avon
- Primary outflows: River Avon
- Catchment area: 55.2 square kilometres (21.3 sq mi)
- Basin countries: United Kingdom
- Water volume: 1.5 million cubic metres (330,000,000 imp gal)

Stanford Reservoir is a drinking water reservoir on the River Avon, England. It lies on the county boundary between Leicestershire and Northamptonshire near the village of Stanford-on-Avon.

The reservoir was built between 1928 and 1930 by the Rugby Urban District Council to supply the nearby town of Rugby with drinking water. It was created by building an earth and clay dam across the original river, and flooding a small valley between the villages of South Kilworth and Stanford. At its north-eastern extremity, the river enters the reservoir via a settling pond and leaves at the other end via a spillway and a specially constructed channel below the dam. There is a by-pass channel along the northern perimeter, controlled by sluice gates, which allows the water level in the reservoir to be regulated and reduced for repair and maintenance works, and for the flow of water in the river below the dam to be maintained.

The reservoir was enlarged between 1958 and 1959, and now covers an area of approximately 58 hectares (140 acres). The average width of the reservoir is around 300 metres (980 ft) and the overall length is approximately 1.8 kilometres (1.1 miles). Following a 1 in 100 year flood risk assessment, the spillway was substantially reconstructed in 2017.

The reservoir is still used for its original role, but is now a top-up for the much larger Draycote Water reservoir, some 15 miles (24 km) to the south-west which was created in the 1960s. It is now owned by the company Severn Trent Water.

The site is considered important for bird species including tufted duck, wigeon, pochard and shoveller and five species of bats. The Wildlife Trust for Bedfordshire, Cambridgeshire and Northamptonshire have a management agreement to look after wildlife aspects.

The reservoir is open to public visits, but requires a permit.
