= Southam College =

Location
- Welsh Road West; Southam, Warwickshire, CV47 0JW; England

Information
- Type: Academy
- Local authority: Warwickshire County Council
- Trust: Stowe Valley Multi Academy Trust
- Department for Education URN: 143905 Tables
- Ofsted: Reports
- Headteacher: M. Mason
- Gender: Coeducational
- Age: 11 to 18
- Enrolment: 1,653
- Houses: Webb Ellis, Godiva, Whittle, Shakespeare
- Website: http://www.southamcollege.com

Southam College is a coeducational secondary school and sixth form located in Southam, Warwickshire, England.

The College achieved its Specialist Technology Status in 2000, Humanities College Status in 2004 and Vocational College Status in 2006. The College has received a national award in recognition of its involvement in the Engineering Education Scheme. A February 2008 Ofsted report accorded the school a Grade 2 (good) However, since the 2011 Ofsted report the school has been Grade 1 (outstanding).

Previously a community school administered by Warwickshire County Council, in April 2017 Southam College converted to academy status. The school is now owned by the Stowe Valley Multi Academy Trust. it now has 1652 students on roll, 314 of whom are in the sixth form as stated on their website.
