= Barby Storage Reservoir =

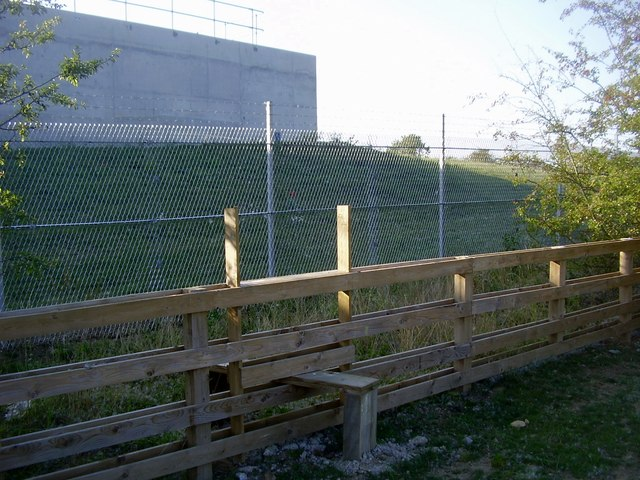

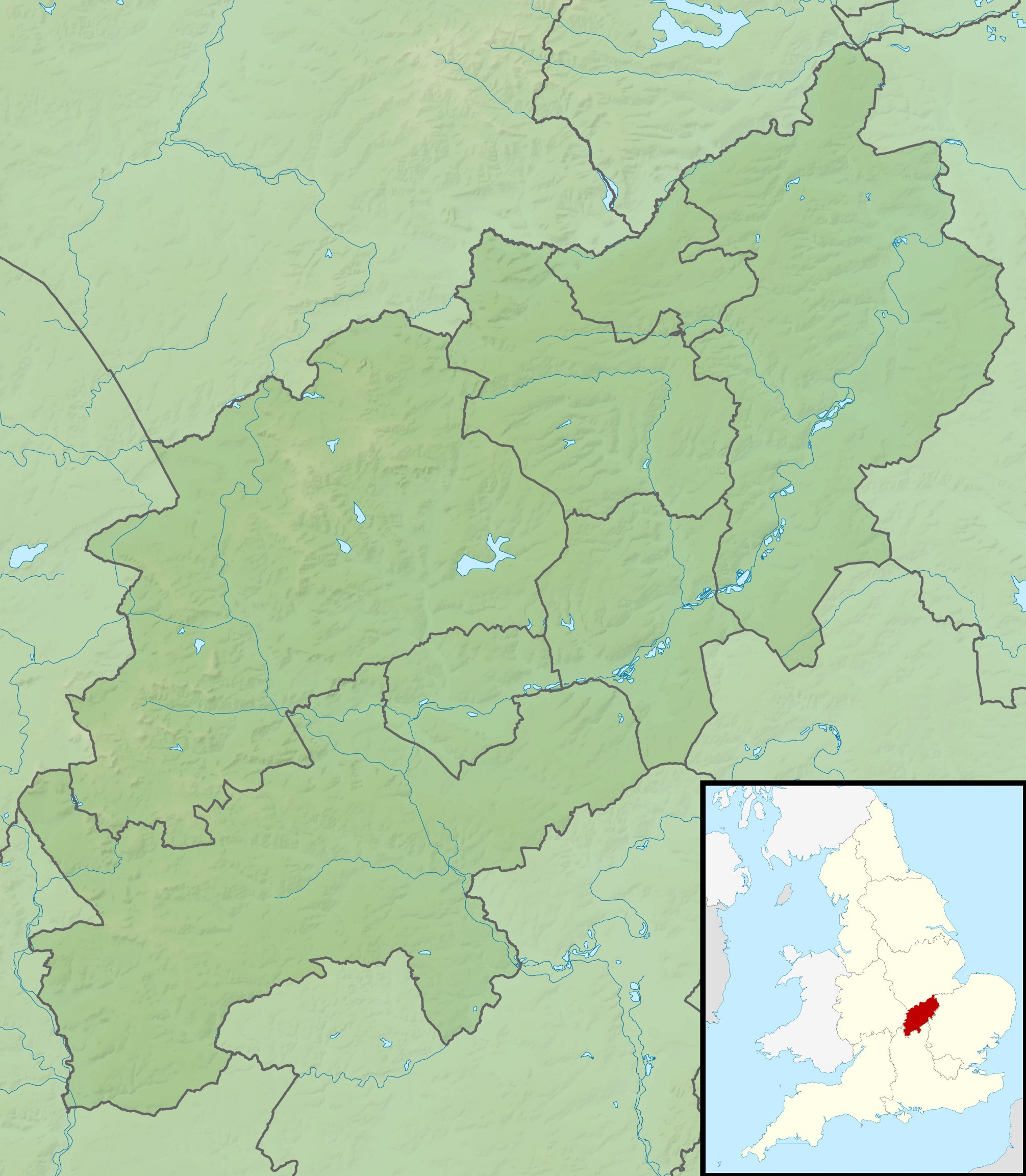
- Location within Northamptonshire
- Location: Northamptonshire
- Coordinates: 52.3205°N 1.1860°W
- Type: reservoir
- Primary inflows: Draycote Water
- Basin countries: United Kingdom
- Max. length: 1,460 feet (450 m)
- Max. width: 740 feet (230 m)
- Islands: 1

Barby Storage Reservoir is an underground reservoir near Barby in Northamptonshire, England, owned and operated by Severn Trent Water. It supplies drinking water to Rugby, being fed by water pumped from Draycote Water.

The site was subject to archaeological excavations between 2009 and 2015, prior to planned extension of the reservoir.
