= Henry Lilley Smith =

Henry Lilley Smith MRCS
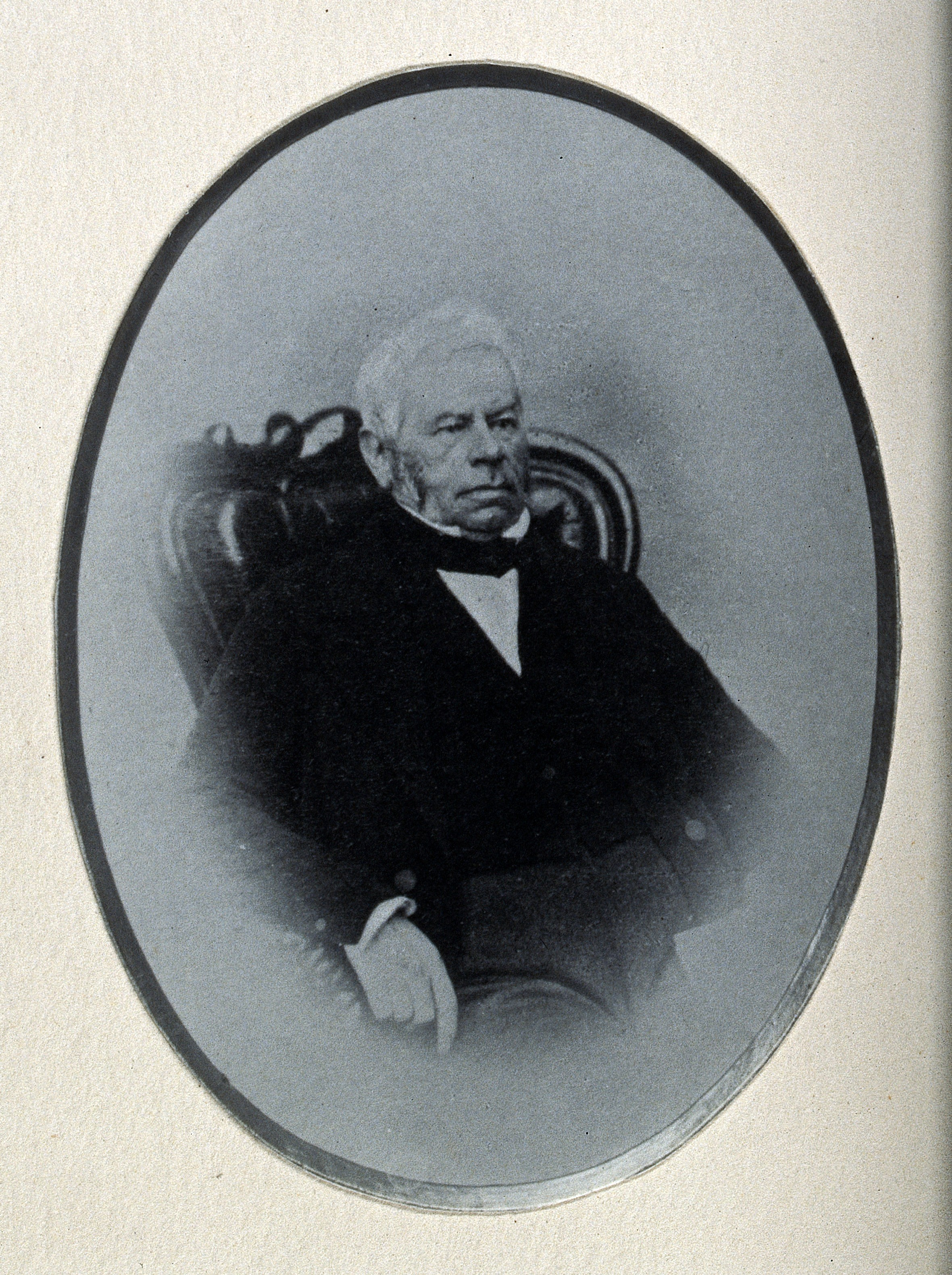
- Henry Lilley Smith. Credit: Wellcome Library
- Born: 1787 or 1788; Southam, Warwickshire, England
- Died: 1859; Southam
- Occupation: Surgeon

Henry Lilley Smith was born in Southam, Warwickshire, England in 1787 or 1788. He became assistant surgeon to the 45th Regiment and obtained a diploma of MRCS in 1810 and then practised at Southam, where he was appointed parish surgeon. In April 1818, he opened a small hospital for the treatment of eye and ear diseases. It was built on land adjoining his house and contained about fourteen beds and was supported by voluntary subscriptions and donations. Smith periodically visited Warwick, Rugby, Banbury, and Northampton to select suitable cases. About 100 in-patients and 250 out-patients were treated annually. In-patients received free professional attendance, medicine and lodging, but had to pay for their food, the charge for which was 10d (old pence) a day for a man, 8d for a woman and 6d for a child. During the first forty years of the 'Eye and Ear Infirmary' 12,220 patients were treated and two-thirds were discharged cured.

In 1823, fired by his ambition to improve medical care for the poor, he established a self-supporting dispensary in Southam under the presidency of Sir Grey Skipwith, MP for South Warwickshire, and his committee. The premises consisted of a two-storied thatched cottage, sited close to the Infirmary. Membership was for Southam residents who could not afford to pay doctor's fees. Patients had to be recommended by employers, clergymen of their parish or by two respectable inhabitants. The annual subscription was 3 shillings and 6d for adults and 2s for children. The dispensary was self-supporting but during the cholera epidemic of 1832 each family had to pay an additional 6d a week.

The Southam Dispensary was the first of its kind and its success resulted in the establishment of others in Atherstone, Chilvers Coton, Burton-on-Trent, Rugby, Coventry and Northampton. Smith was one of the original members of The British Medical Association and was an adviser to those wishing to follow his example.

He also initiated a 'Maypole Holiday' in 1825 which is still held as the 'May Fair' in Southam today (2012) and provided allotments for local boys aged between 8 and 14. Each boy was required to grow some flowers, herbs and at least 6 kinds of vegetable. A small rent was charged and a small library for them was provided.

Smith died in 1859 in Southam, where, on Leamington Road, there is a memorial to his life and work close to the site of his dispensary, which was demolished in 1868. The memorial, erected in 1889, is to be found next to his hospital building which is now enlarged and used as a wedding venue called Warwick House.
