= Draycote Meadows =

Site of scientific interest in Warwickshire. UK

Coordinates: 52.3339°N 1.3388°W

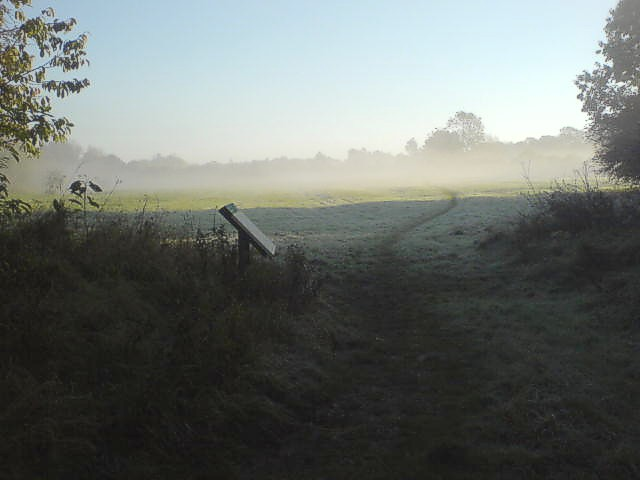
Draycote Meadows. Mist and dew on the Meadows Nature Reserve.

Draycote Meadows SSSI (grid reference SP451708) is a 10 acres (4.0 ha) Site of Special Scientific Interest, notified in 1973. The site is 4 miles (6.4 km) southwest of Rugby immediately to the north of Draycote village. It is accessed from the B4453, close to the A45's London Road interchange. The site is managed by the Warwickshire Wildlife Trust and is well known for its flower rich hay meadows and variety of butterflies.

== Description ==
Draycote Meadows encompasses two areas of meadow, described as "ridge and furrow" meadows lying over clay soil. The northern meadow is cut for hay at the end of each summer while the southern meadow is normally used for summer grazing. The reserve covers 6 hectares (15 acres)

== Flora ==
The two meadows at Draycote Meadows are species rich. Over 20,000 flower spikes of the green-winged orchids have been counted in some years, a sight which has been described as "breathtaking". Other wildflowers which can be seen here include cowslip, pepper saxifrage and the rare spiny restharrow. In addition, the grassland ferns adder’s-tongue and moonwort which are unusual in Warwickshire, grow here alongside better known meadow flowers such as yellow rattle, meadow vetchling and knapweed.

The stream running through the meadows is fed by spring-water creating a thriving community of wet loving herbs such as brooklime, lesser water-parsnip and meadowsweet. The site's hedgerows contain English elm, blackthorn and wild privet, with occasional common oak, ash and gean specimens adding diversity. Intermixed with the shrubs and trees are ivy and dog-rose.

In the autumn the site reveals its diversity of fungi and it is host to over a dozen species of waxcap while other fungi species recorded on site include white spindles, smokey spindles and meadow coral.

== Fauna ==
Over 20 species of butterfly have been recorded at Draycote Meadows, including common blue, small copper, marbled white, small skipper, large skipper and hedge brown. Grass snakes are found here while the trees and hedgerows around the meadows provide nesting sites for green woodpecker, great spotted woodpecker and Eurasian nuthatch in the summer as well as attracting wintering thrushes such as fieldfare and redwing during the winter months.
