= Draycote =

Hamlet in Warwickshire, England

Coordinates: 52.325968°N 1.348509°W

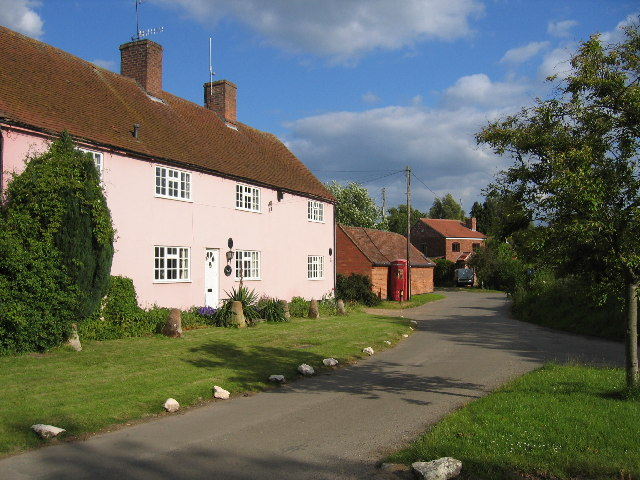
- Houses in Draycote

- Location within Warwickshire
- OS grid reference: SP4470
- Civil parish: Bourton and Draycote
- District: Rugby
- Shire county: Warwickshire
- Region: West Midlands
- Country: England
- Sovereign state: United Kingdom
- Post town: RUGBY
- Postcode district: CV23
- Dialling code: 01926
- Police: Warwickshire
- Fire: Warwickshire
- Ambulance: West Midlands
- UK Parliament: Kenilworth and Southam

Draycote is a small hamlet in Warwickshire, England. It forms part of the civil parish of Bourton and Draycote along with nearby Bourton-on-Dunsmore, which is located around half a mile to the west, uphill from Draycote.

Draycote is located in a valley just to the west of Draycote Water reservoir, which is named after the hamlet and is home to Draycote Water Sailing Club.

Draycote is quite remote, with only one narrow lane accessing the village from the B4453 road, which then loops back towards Bourton-on-Dunsmore.

The remains of the former Rugby to Leamington Spa railway line run west of Draycote. Part of the former line between Draycote and Birdingbury has recently been converted into a cycleway as part of the National Cycle Network.

Near the village is the Draycote Meadows nature reserve.
