= Dallas Burston Polo Club =

Coordinates: 52.254890°N 1.415170°W

The Dallas Burston Polo Club is a 600 acre polo club based near the market town of Southam, Warwickshire. Opened in 1999, and merged with the Stoneleigh Park club in 2003, it was until 2012 named the RLS Polo Club. It boasts 6 polo grounds, an all-weather SuperArena as well as a 3,000 person capacity conference and events venue which opened in 2014. There are 15 paddocks and 26 stables for horses. There is also a bar and lounge named the Millstone Hare which is open Monday to Sunday and serves traditional pub styled food. In November 2015 it was announced that there would be a £122 million investment in the club over the next 12 years, adding a hotel, up to 100 holiday lodges and a re-vamped player's pavilion.

In 2014 the club was used as a filming location for the E4 TV show "Made in Chelsea" when the cast go and watch a polo match together.

== Events ==
There are many events that take place over the course of the year at Dallas Burston Polo Club including the very popular 'Ladies day' a gripping Polo tournament and the VIP After-Party. The Equestrian Day show casing equestrian sports, and The Fine & Country Gold Cup – which has been running for over 10 years.
