= Draycote Water =

Reservoir in Warwickshire, England

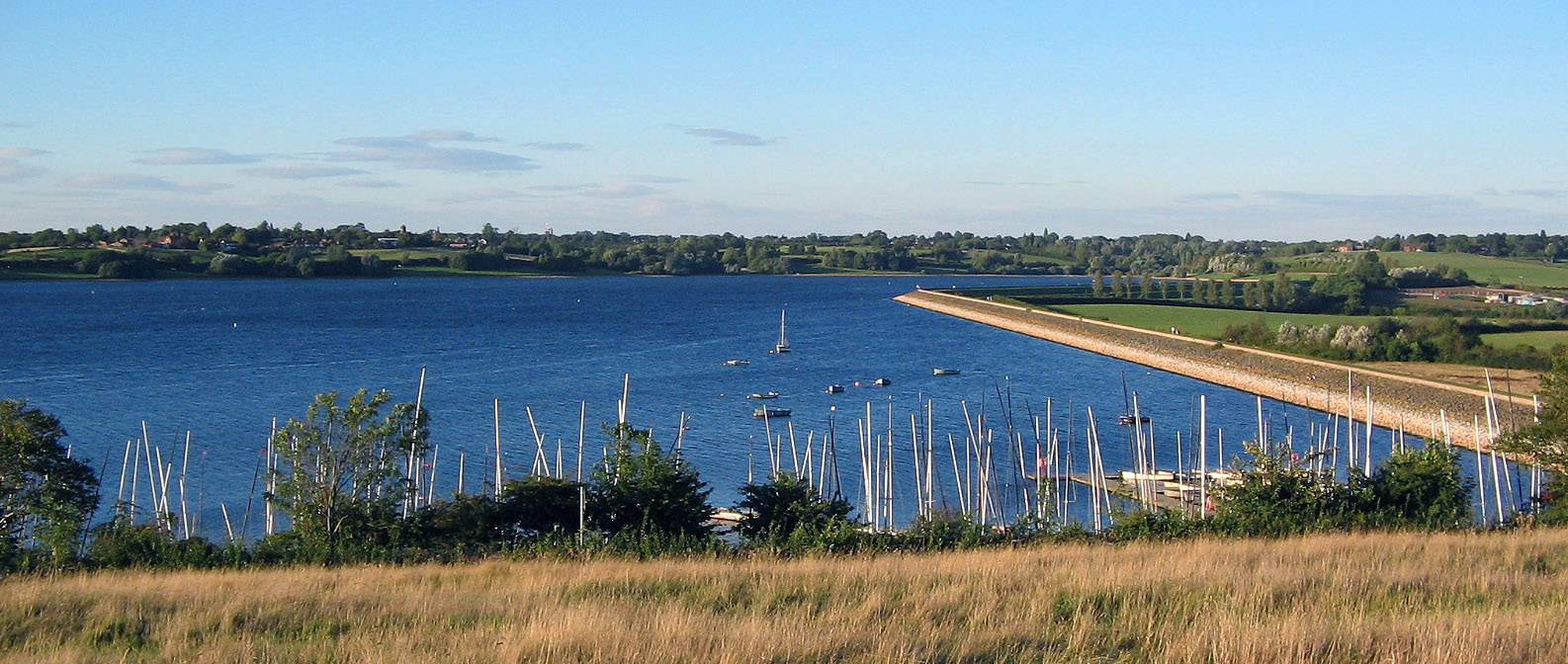
- Draycote Water

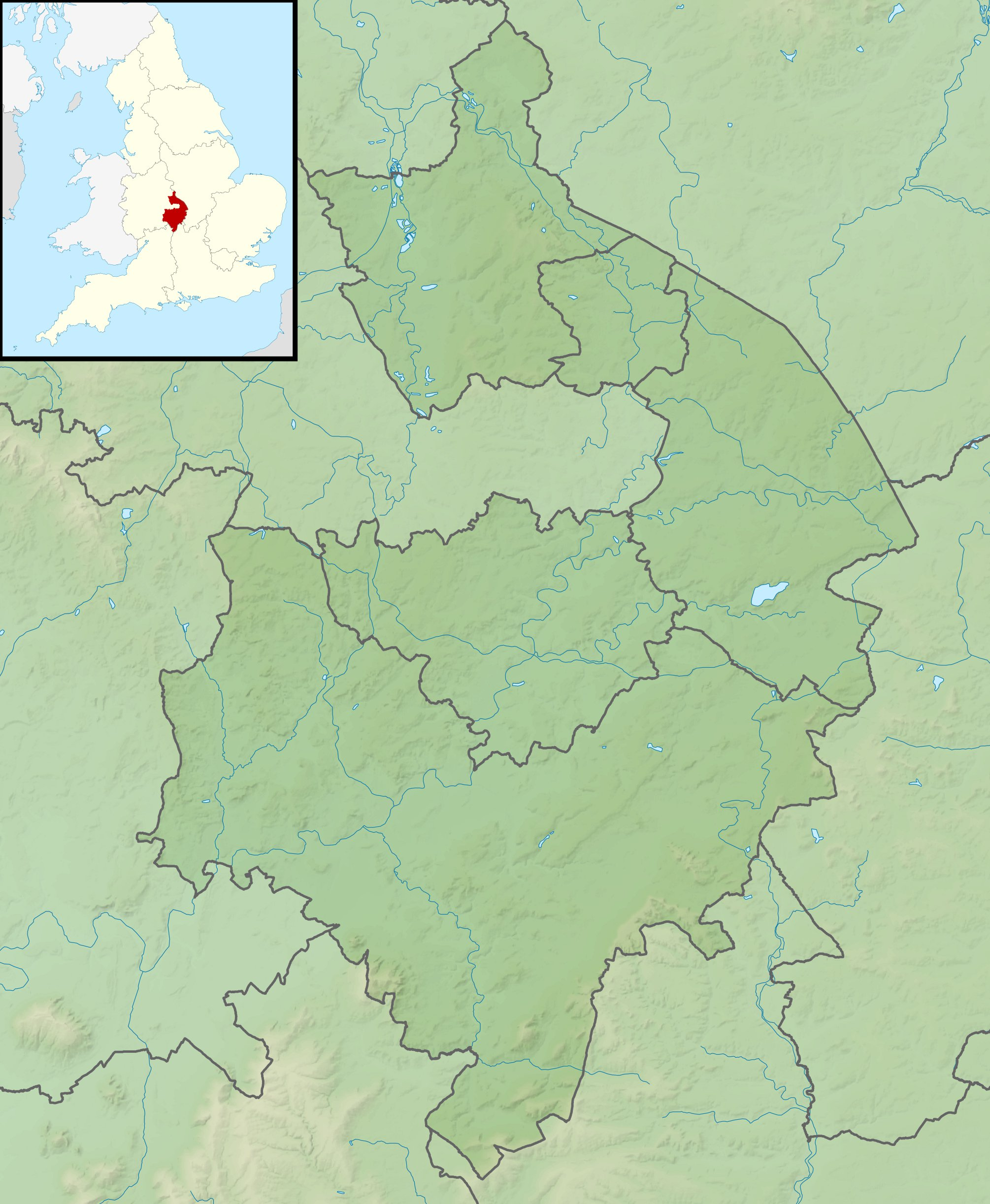
- Location within Warwickshire
- Location: Warwickshire
- Coordinates: 52.31727°N 1.34127°W
- Lake type: Reservoir
- Basin countries: United Kingdom
- Managing agency: Severn Trent Water
- First flooded: 1969
- Surface area: 240 hectares (590 acres)
- Average depth: 70 feet (21 m)
- Water volume: 5 billion gallons (23 million m³)

Draycote Water is a 240-hectare (590-acre) reservoir and country park near the village of Dunchurch, 3.75 miles (6 km) south of Rugby in Warwickshire, England, owned and operated by Severn Trent Water. It draws its water from the River Leam, and supplies drinking water to Rugby and Coventry. It is named after the nearby hamlet of Draycote and is the largest body of water within Warwickshire.

The reservoir was created in the 1960s and was opened in 1970, with a new pipe and pump installed in 2012. It has a capacity of up to 5 billion gallons (23 million m³) and a maximum depth of 70 feet (21 m).

It is a site for birdwatching and has a bird hide, with a feeding station sponsored by the West Midland Bird Club. Severn-Trent manage an adjacent 20 acres (8 ha) country park. Draycote is used by cyclists, runners, windsurfers, fly fishers and for boating. Fishing is for brown trout and rainbow trout from the banks or from boats. A farm to the north east of the site has a herd of alpacas.

== Description ==
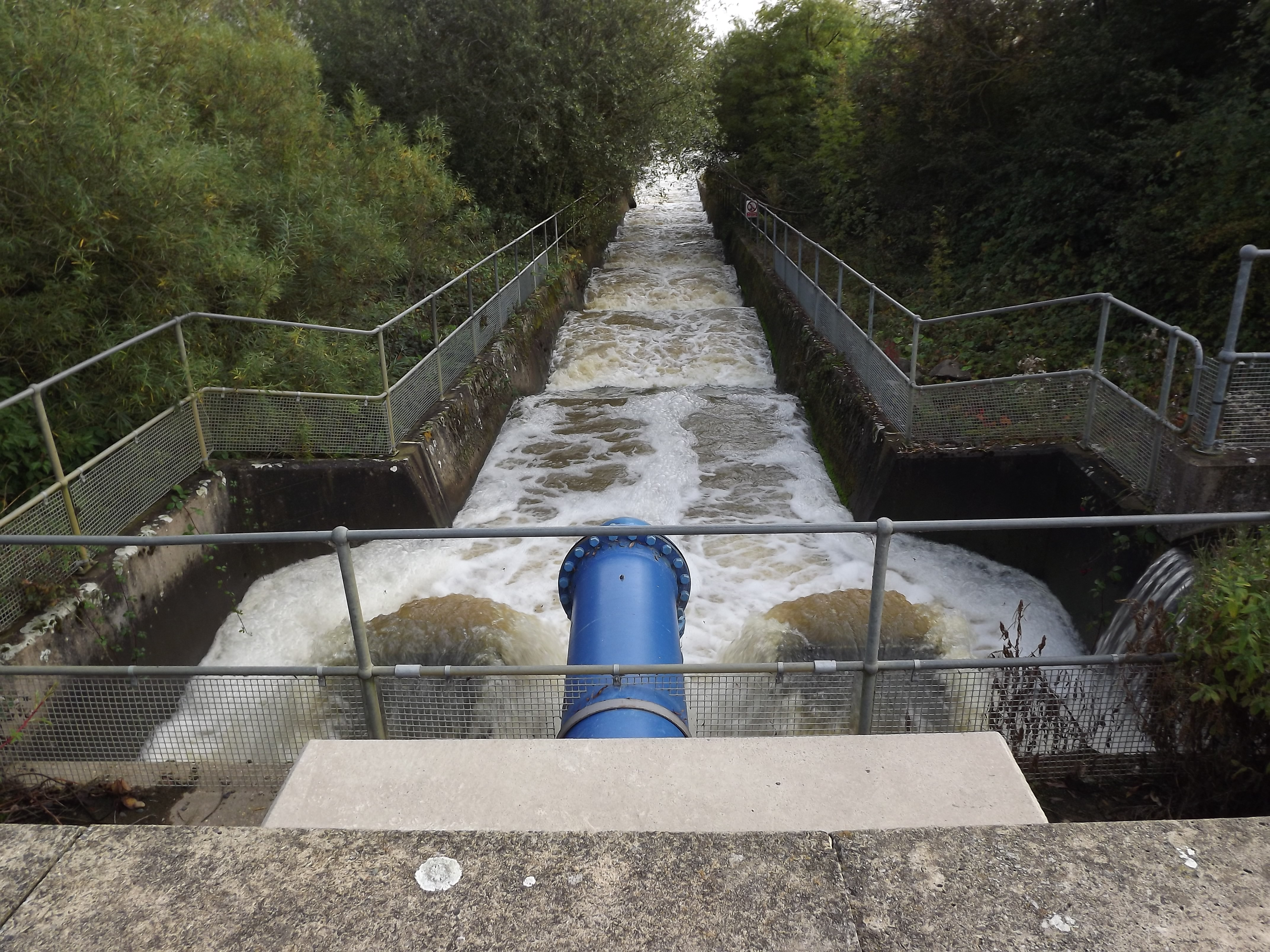
The water inlet of Draycote Water

Draycote Water is an artificial reservoir, which supplies water to southern and eastern Warwickshire, in particular Rugby (via Barby Storage Reservoir) and Coventry. Owned and managed by Severn Trent Water, it is located just to the south of the M45 motorway in the hamlet of Draycote, which is close to Dunchurch. It is accessed from the A426 road, at grid reference SP450690. The reservoir has no natural inlets, its water being obtained by pumping from the nearby River Leam and from nearby Stanford Reservoir which obtains its water from the River Avon. It has an area of approximately 240 hectares (590 acres), with a maximum depth of 70 feet (21 m) and a capacity of 5 billion gallons (23 million m³). The shoreline of the reservoir is a mixture of concrete and natural embankment.

Draycote Water was built between 1967 and 1969, to cope with rising demand in eastern and southern Warwickshire, and opened in 1970. In early 2012 the reservoir had to be closed temporarily, as record-low rainfall during the winter months had caused its level to reduce to less than 50% of capacity. Severn Trent responded by reversing the flow of water in an existing pipeline between Draycote Water and Welches Meadow Reservoir adjacent to the River Leam in Leamington Spa. This development required a short length of new pipe at the Draycote end and a new pump at Leamington.

== Flora and fauna ==
The reservoir features many bird species. This includes the great northern diver, which makes a prolonged visit during the winter months, along with kittiwake and small numbers of Mediterranean and little gulls. There are several species of diving duck with the tufted duck the most common, numbering around 1,200 individuals. The most common bird at the site is the black-headed gull, which forms the majority of a gull roost of more than 50,000 individuals. A number of waders visit Draycote in the autumn, including the ringed and little ringed plover.

The reservoir's fish include the brown trout and rainbow trout, some with a mass in excess of 5 kilograms (11 lb). These are fished for sport, both from boats and from the banks.

To the north east of the reservoir is Toft Farm, which features a herd of alpacas.

== Sport and leisure ==
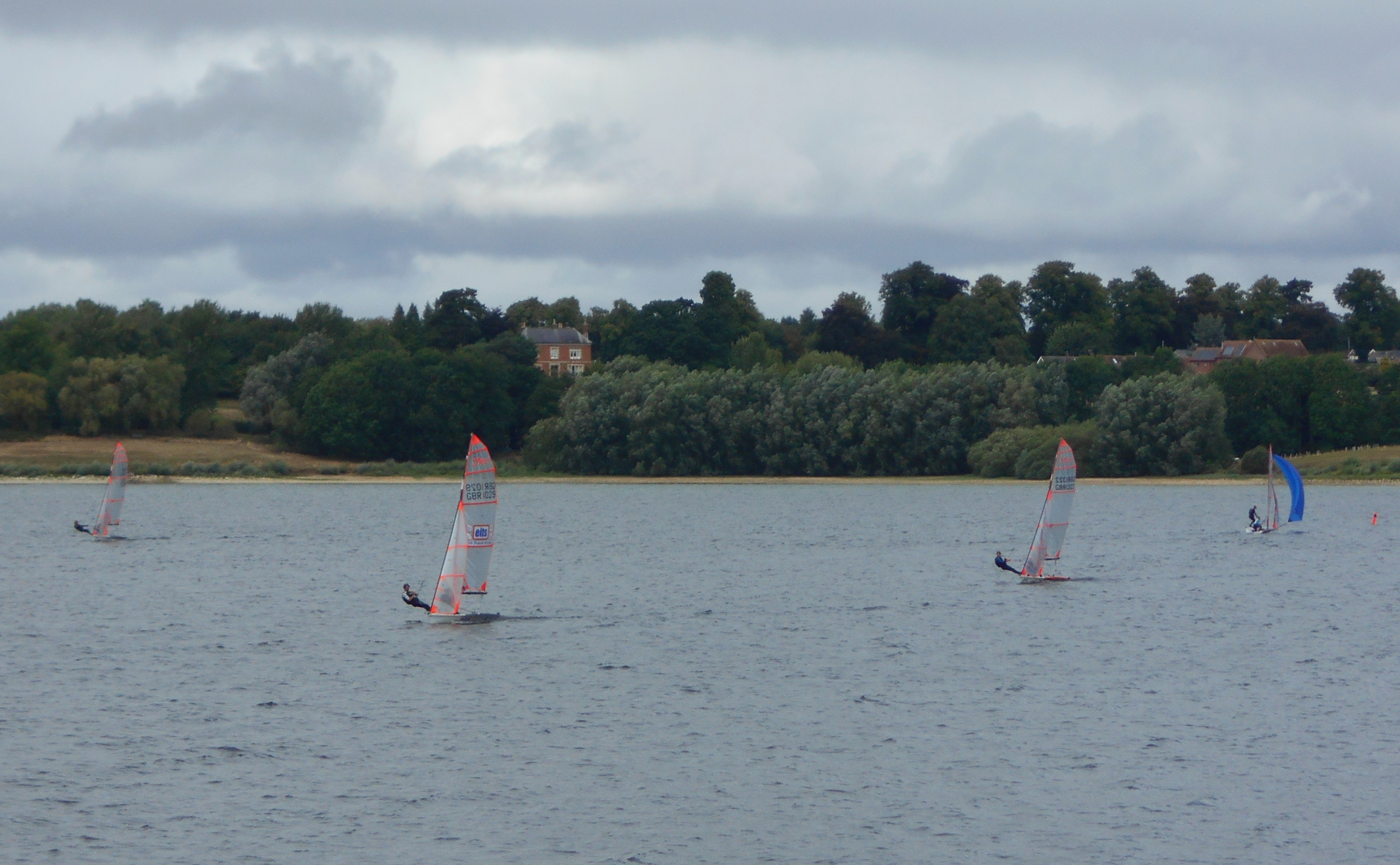
Sailing boats at Draycote Water.

Draycote Water has a country park on its southern shore, which extends across 21 acres (8.5 ha). The park has facilities for bird watching and fishing, as well as several nature trails and a visitor centre. A track around the perimeter allows cyclists and walkers to circumnavigate the reservoir, a total distance of 5 miles (8 km). The Draycote Water Sailing Club is situated on the shoreline and offers dinghy sailing and windsurfing as well as races.

The reservoir's owner, Severn Trent Water, warns the public not to swim in the reservoir, citing the large depth, potentially cold temperatures, and the risk of currents caused by the pumps which supply the water.

== See also ==
- Stanford Reservoir
