= Dunchurch =

Village in Warwickshire, England

Coordinates: 52°20′14″N 1°17′22″W

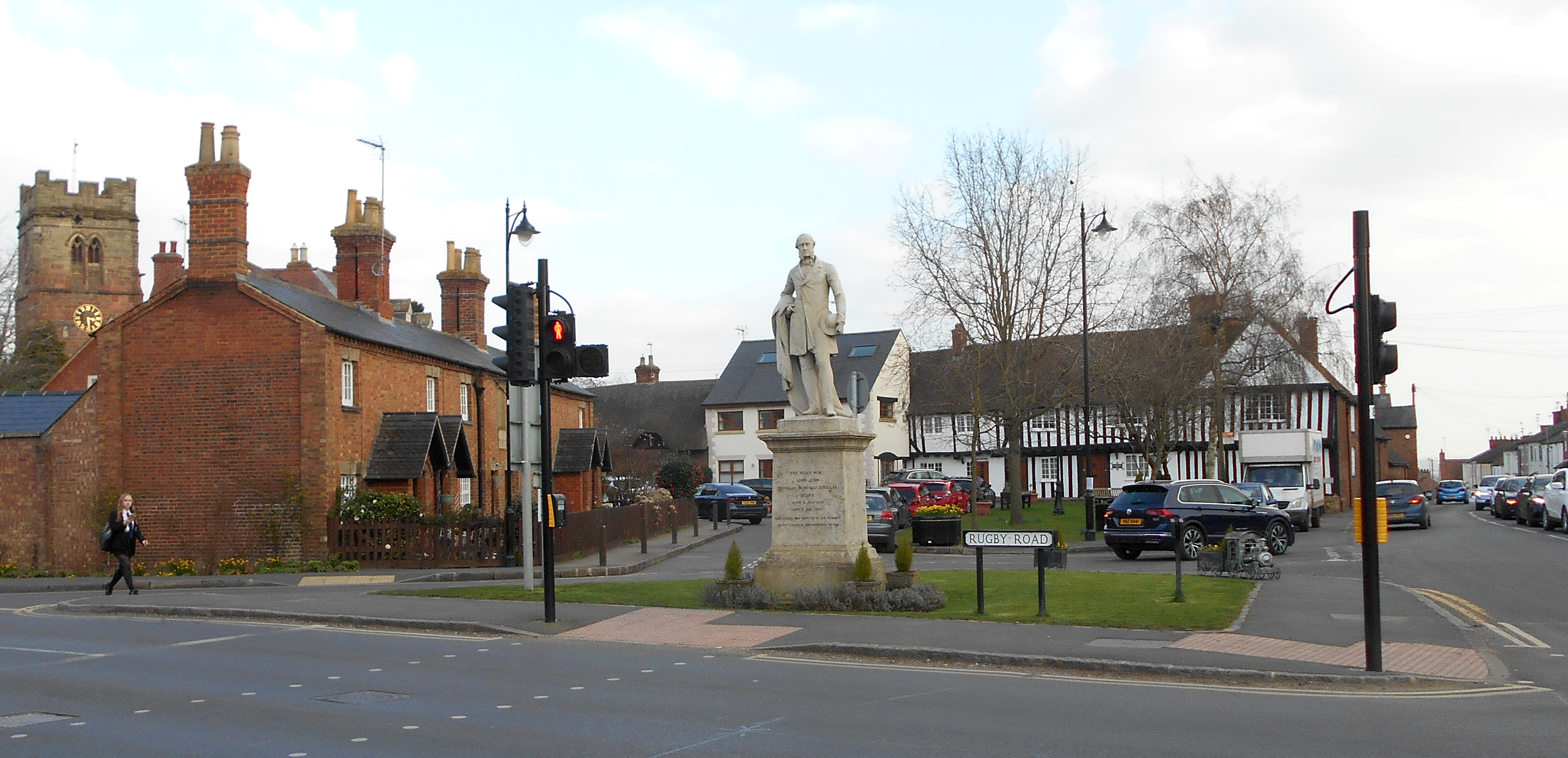
- Daventry Road and the Square viewed from Rugby Road in the village centre

- Location within Warwickshire
- Population: 4,123 (2021 census)
- OS grid reference: SP485712
- Civil parish: Dunchurch
- District: Rugby
- Shire county: Warwickshire
- Region: West Midlands
- Country: England
- Sovereign state: United Kingdom
- Post town: RUGBY
- Postcode district: CV22
- Dialling code: 01788
- Police: Warwickshire
- Fire: Warwickshire
- Ambulance: West Midlands
- UK Parliament: Kenilworth and Southam

Dunchurch is a village and civil parish in the Borough of Rugby, approximately 2.5 miles (4.0 km) south-west of central Rugby in Warwickshire, England. The civil parish, which also includes the nearby hamlet of Toft, had a population of 4,123 at the 2021 Census, a significant increase from 2,938 at the 2011 Census.

== History ==
The earliest historical reference to Dunchurch was in the Domesday Book of 1086, which mentioned a settlement called Don Cerce.

The core of the village has been declared a conservation area because it has many buildings of historical interest. Some of the buildings date to the 15th century are timber-framed and still have traditional thatch roofs.

As Dunchurch was located at the crossroads of the coaching roads between London and Birmingham (now the A45 road) (classified as B4429 through the village) and Oxford and Leicester (now the A426 road), it was for centuries an important staging post. At one point, there were 27 coaching inns in Dunchurch to cater for travellers. Two of these still remain; the 'Dun Cow' and 'The Green Man'

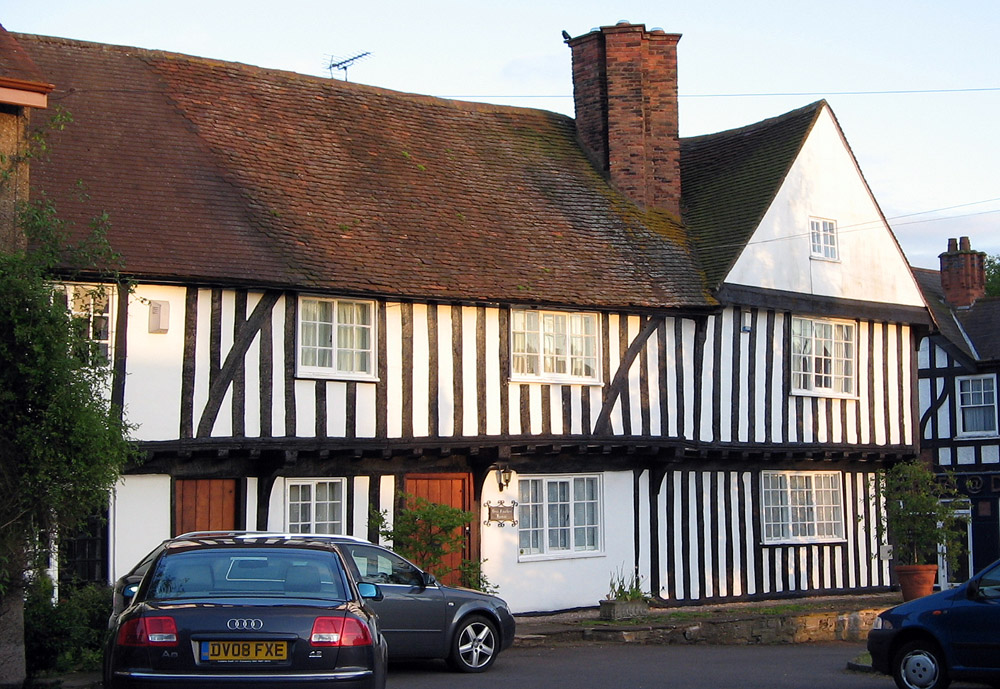
Guy Fawkes House, now a private residence, formerly the 'Lion Inn'

Many notable people have stayed at Dunchurch. Most notably, in 1605 the Gunpowder Plotters stayed at the 'Lion Inn' (now a private residence called 'Guy Fawkes House') in Dunchurch, convened by Sir Everard Digby, awaiting news of Guy Fawkes's attempt to blow up the Houses of Parliament. If he had been successful they planned to kidnap the King's daughter Princess Elizabeth from nearby Coombe Abbey.

Other well known people who have stayed in the village include the young Queen Victoria (before she became Queen) and the Duke of Wellington. Robert Stephenson stayed in Dunchurch when supervising the construction of the Kilsby Tunnel during the building of the London and Birmingham Railway.

Dunchurch was for many centuries a more important settlement than nearby Rugby, that changed however with the coming of the railways in the 19th century; Rugby became a major railway centre and grew into a large town, this led to a dramatic decline in the coaching trade, and a decline in the importance of Dunchurch. However, from 1871 until 1964 the village was served by its own railway station about two miles from the village on the Rugby to Leamington Spa line.

The ancient parish of Dunchurch included the village itself, plus the nearby settlements of Cawston, Thurlaston, and Toft; The former two have become separate civil parishes. In the early 1930s part of the civil parish of Dunchurch was transferred to Rugby, and the part of the parish of Bilton which was not merged with Rugby was transferred to Dunchurch.

== Education ==
There are three schools in the area: Dunchurch Infant and Nursery School (School Street), Dunchurch Boughton C of E Junior School (Dew Close) and Bilton Grange Preparatory School (Rugby Road).

== Religion ==
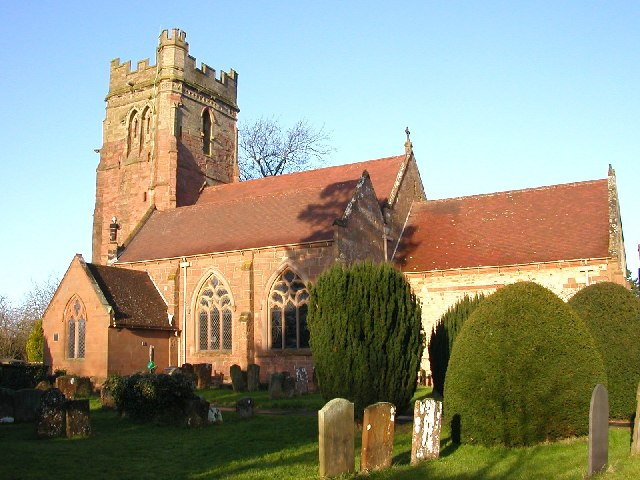
St Peter's church

There are three churches in the village: St Peter's (Church of England) in the centre, a Methodist chapel in Cawston Lane and a Baptist church on the outskirts of the village on the Coventry road.

St Peter's, dating from the 12th century, is a grade II* listed building.

== Culture ==
The village has a sportsfield on Rugby Road donated to the village by Baron Waring in the 1920s. Currently Dunchurch & Bilton Cricket Club play in the summer months and Dunchurch Football Club play in the winter. Cricket has been played on the land since the 1800s. In 1999 Dunchurch Cricket Club merged with Bilton Cricket Club to form Dunchurch & Bilton Cricket Club. The changing rooms for the pitches are found adjacent to the village hall which was opened in 2003. There is a large main hall which can seat up to 160 people as well as a smaller sports room. Both have attached kitchens.

Other groups in the village include: Dunchurch Silver Band, District of Dunchurch Brass, Dunchurch Festival Group, Guides, Dunchurch Health Walks, Scouts, Mothers' Union, Photographic Club, St. Peter's Bell Ringers, Dunchurch Twinning Association, Dunchurch and Thurlaston Women's Institute, Working Men's Club.

== Statue ==
In the centre of Dunchurch is a statue of Lord John Douglas-Montagu-Scott (1809–1860) a 19th-century local landowner, Scottish M.P. and younger brother of the 5th Duke of Buccleuch. Sculpted by Joseph Durham A.R.A., the statue is a Grade II listed structure.

Since the 1970s, a tradition has developed to decorate the statue as a cartoon or TV character at the beginning of the Christmas holidays. The statue was dressed up as Queen Elizabeth II during her diamond jubilee weekend celebrations. In 2012 the statue was dressed up as an Olympian for the final leg of the Olympic torch relay sporting a headband and runners jersey. In recent years, it has also been dressed in other guises, including Paddington Bear, and The Grinch.

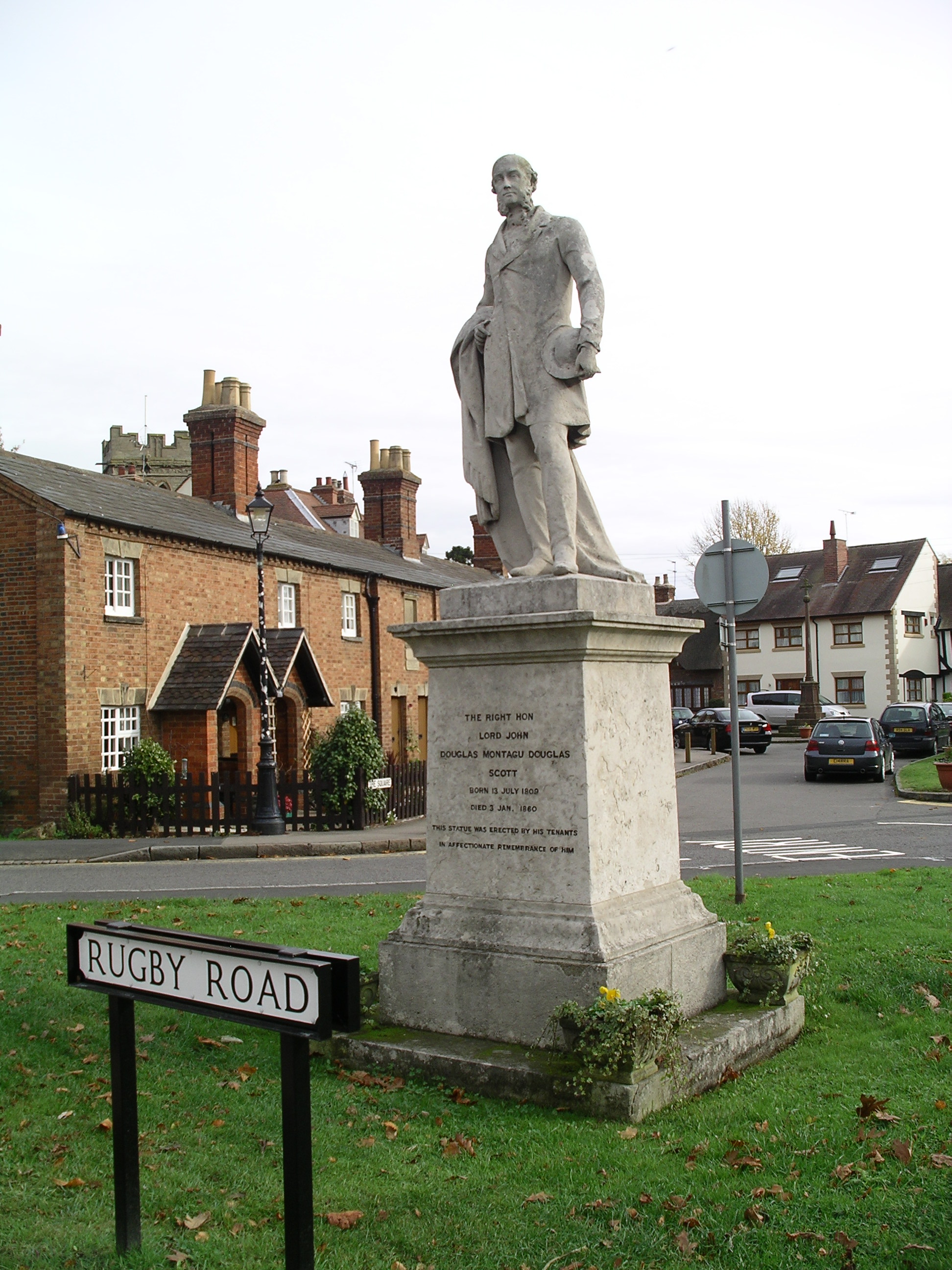
Statue of Lord John Douglas-Montagu-Scott by Joseph Durham

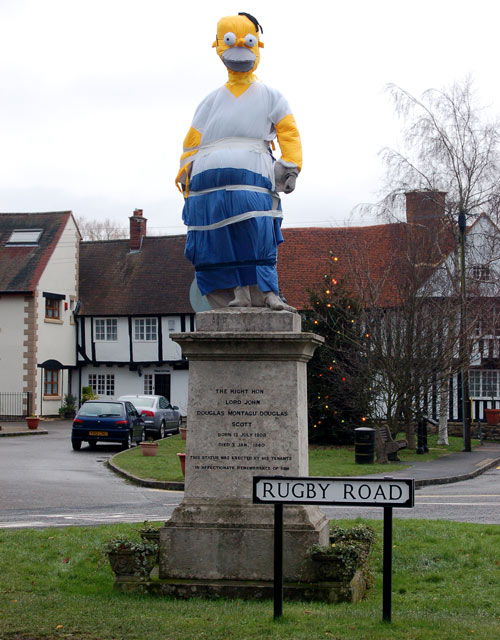
The statue dressed up as Homer Simpson at New Year 2009

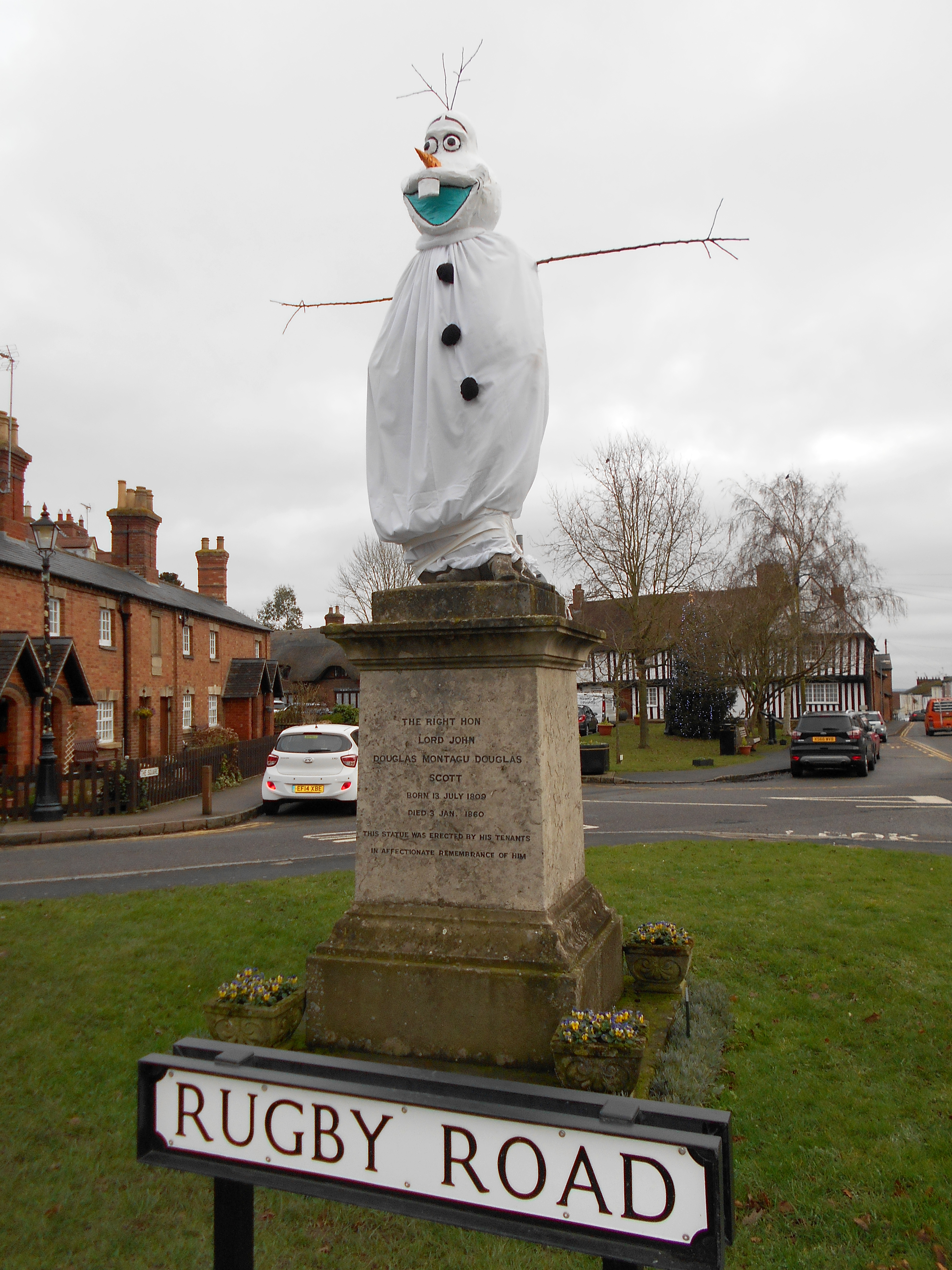
The statue dressed up as Olaf at New Year 2019

== Notable residents ==
- Ian Bell, (born 1982) cricketer
- Laura Bettinson (born 1987) singer, songwriter and record producer.
- Alan Hodgkinson MBE, (1936–2015) footballer
- Katharine Merry, (born 1974) retired athlete, sports commentator
- William Tans'ur, (1706–1783) 18th-century hymnwriter

== Twinning ==
In 1987, Dunchurch was twinned with the village of Ferrières-en-Brie in France.

== Legacy ==
In 1877, the community of Newcombe in Ontario was renamed Dunchurch, Ontario by then postmaster George Kelcey after his birthplace in Warwickshire.
