= Southam =

Market town in Warwickshire, England

Coordinates: 52.252°N 1.39°W

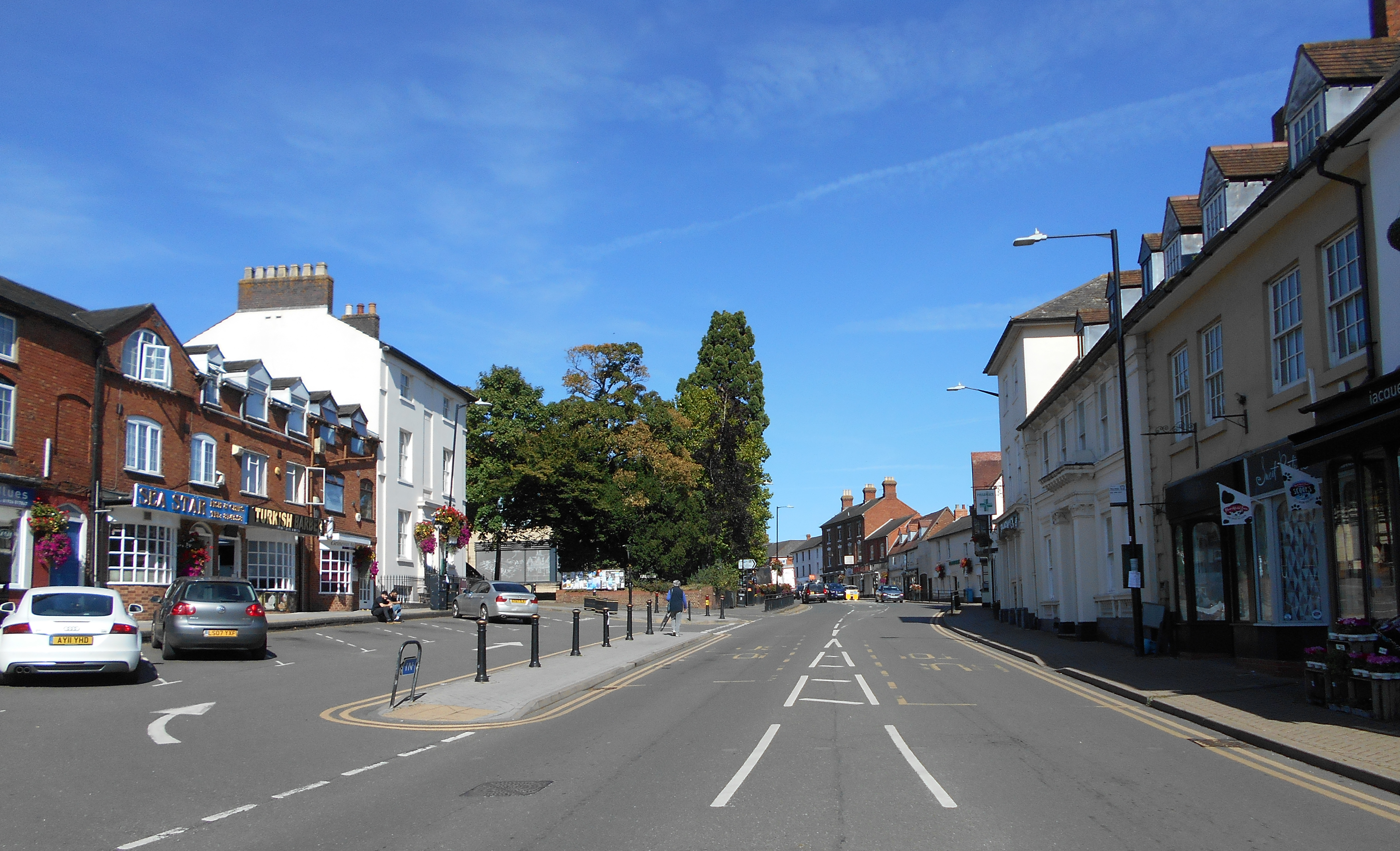
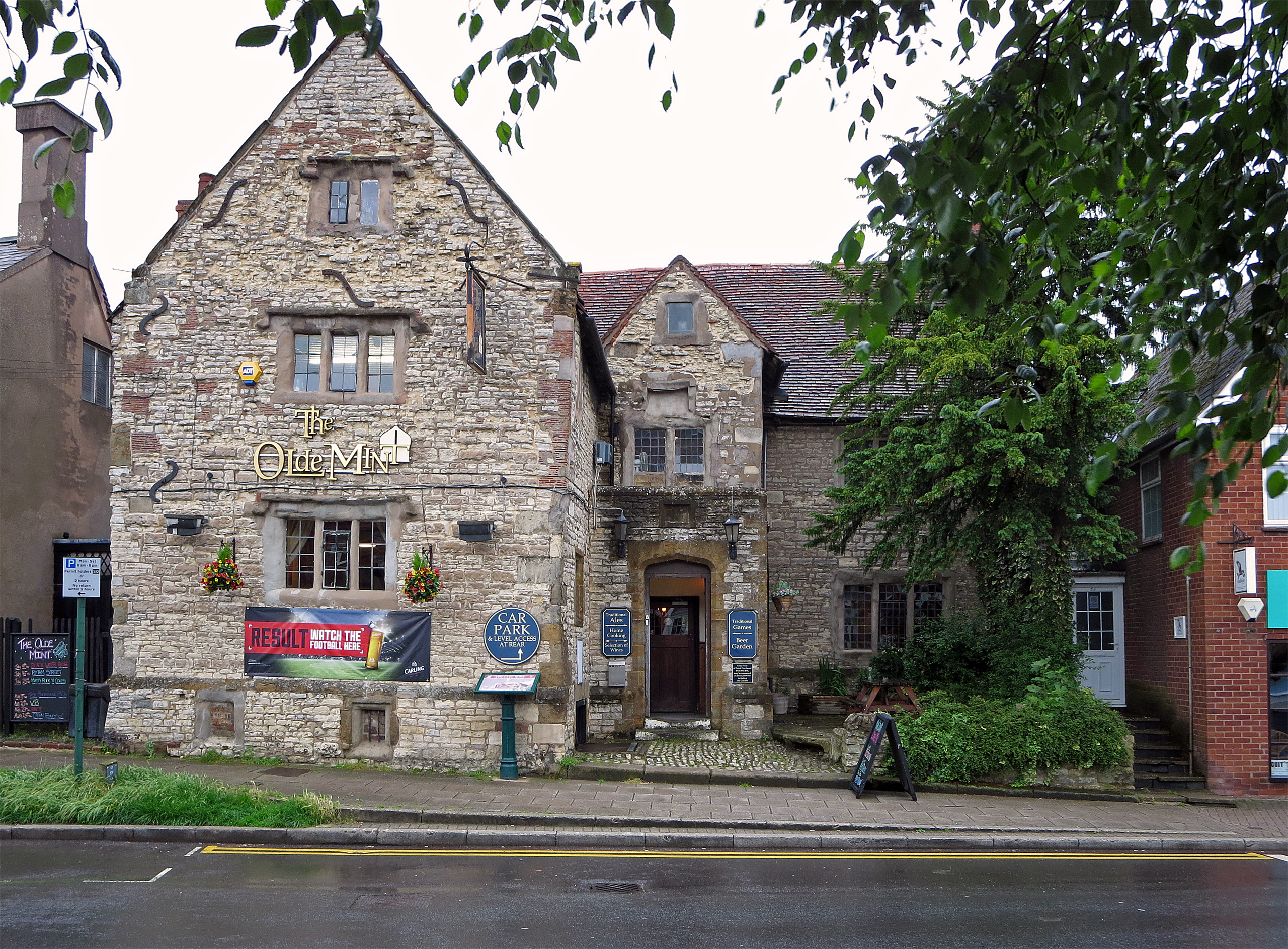
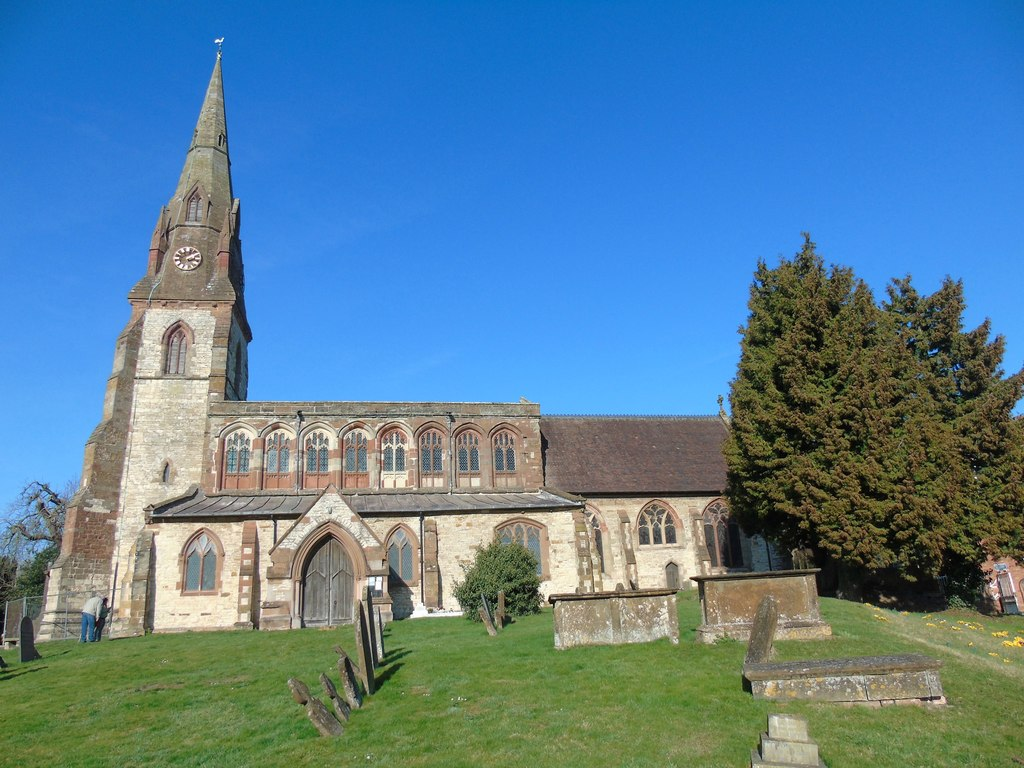
- From left to right: Top: Market Hill, at the centre of Southam; Bottom: The Olde Mint & St James' Church

- Location within Warwickshire
- Population: 8,114 (2021 census)
- OS grid reference: SP4161
- Civil parish: Southam
- District: Stratford-on-Avon
- Shire county: Warwickshire
- Region: West Midlands
- Country: England
- Sovereign state: United Kingdom
- Post town: SOUTHAM
- Postcode district: CV47
- Dialling code: 01926
- Police: Warwickshire
- Fire: Warwickshire
- Ambulance: West Midlands
- UK Parliament: Kenilworth and Southam

Southam (/ˈsaʊðəm/) is a market town and civil parish in the Stratford-on-Avon district of Warwickshire, England, located about 6 1/2 miles (10 km) east-southeast of Leamington Spa. In the 2021 census, the population of Southam was 8,114.

== History ==
The name Southam derives from the Old English sūðhām meaning 'south village' or perhaps sūðhamm meaning 'south hemmed-in land'.

Southam was a Royal manor until AD 998, when Ethelred the Unready granted it to Earl Leofwine. When Coventry Priory was founded in 1043, Leofwine's son Leofric, Earl of Mercia granted Southam to it. The Domesday Book records the manor as "Sucham". The Priory, which in the 12th century became the first Coventry Cathedral, kept Southam until the 16th century when it surrendered all its estates to the Crown in the Dissolution of the Monasteries.

Southam developed at the intersection of several roads: the main road between Coventry and Oxford (now the A423 road), the main road from Warwick to Northampton via Daventry, and the ancient drovers' road known as Welsh Road. In 1227, the monks of Coventry Priory were granted a market charter for their manor at Southam, causing it to develop into a market town. Southam later received charters to hold three yearly fairs: Medieval fairs were special markets, held only a few times a year, which attracted buyers and sellers from longer distances than the normal weekly market.

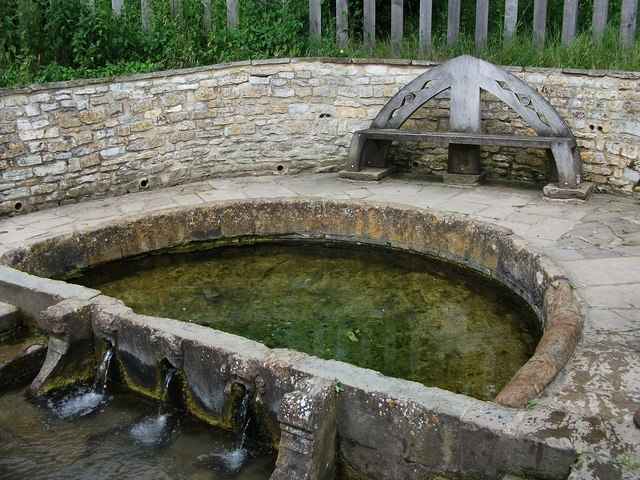
Southam's Holy Well

Southam's Holy Well, in the picturesque Stowe river valley, is Grade II listed and a Scheduled Ancient Monument, and was first recorded in the year 998. The Well was used in medieval times by local monks and for hundreds of years as the town's principal water supply. Water from a natural mineral spring feeds the semi-circular Well and pours through the mouths of carved stone gargoyles into the river. The water from the Well was said to cure eye complaints. The Holy Well and paths were renovated during 2005–2007 using a National Lottery grant.

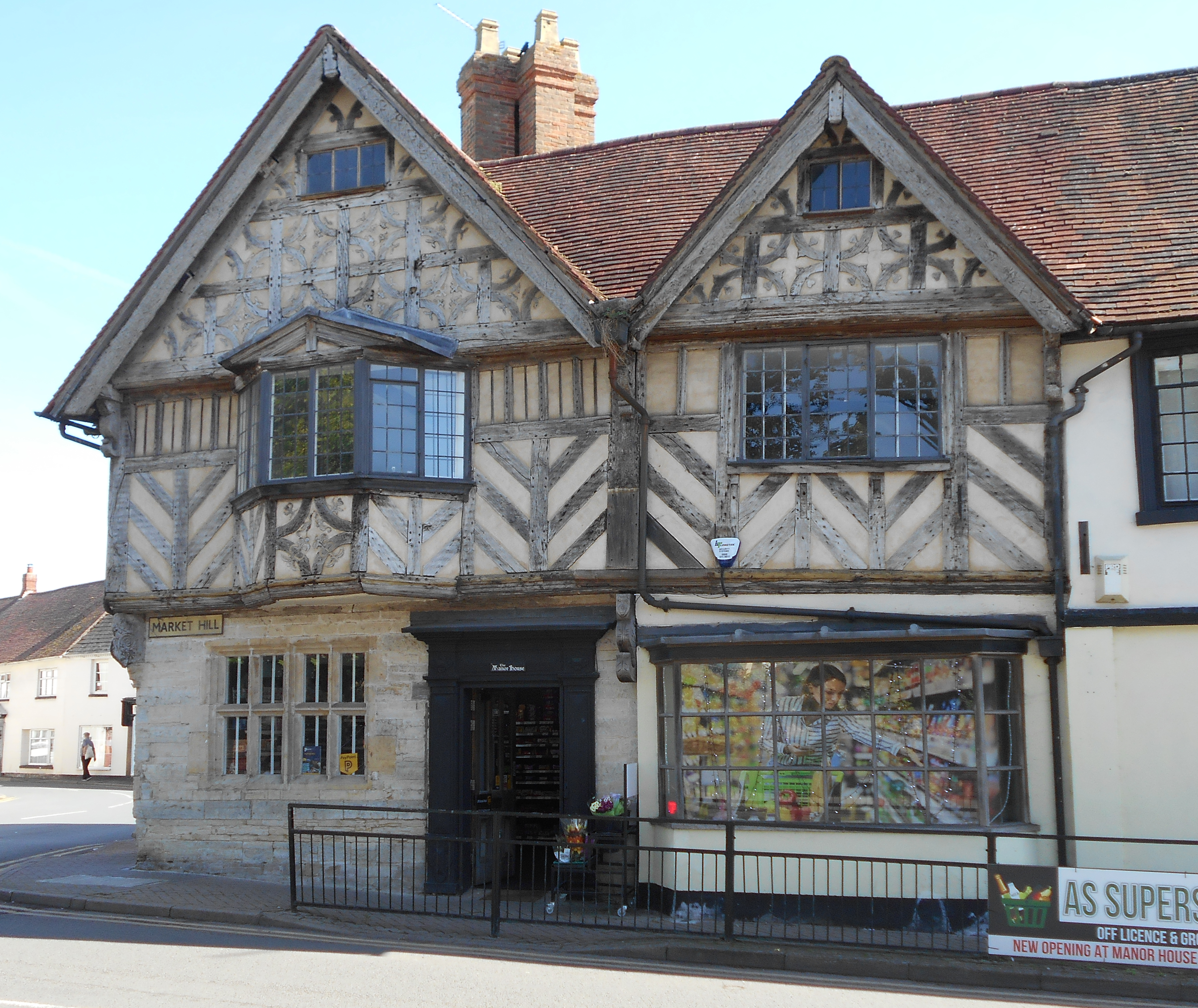
Old Manor House, Southam, dating from the 16th century. King Charles I is said to have stayed here

Southam's manor house in the centre of town is Grade II listed and dates from the 16th century. The present parish church of St James was built in the 14th century. In the 15th century the spire was added and the chancel was rebuilt. The nave's clerestory and present roof were added in the 16th century, along with the present west door. St James' is a Grade I listed building.

In the 1540s John Leland visited the town and described it as "a modest market town of a single street". William Shakespeare mentions Southam in Henry VI, part 3, Act V, Scene I, Lines 10–16:

WARWICK
Say, Somerville, what says my loving son?
And, by thy guess, how nigh is Clarence now?

SOMERSET
At Southam I did leave him with his forces,
And do expect him here some two hours hence.

WARWICK
Then Clarence is at hand, I hear his drum.

SOMERSET
It is not his, my lord; here Southam lies:
The drum your honour hears marcheth from Warwick.

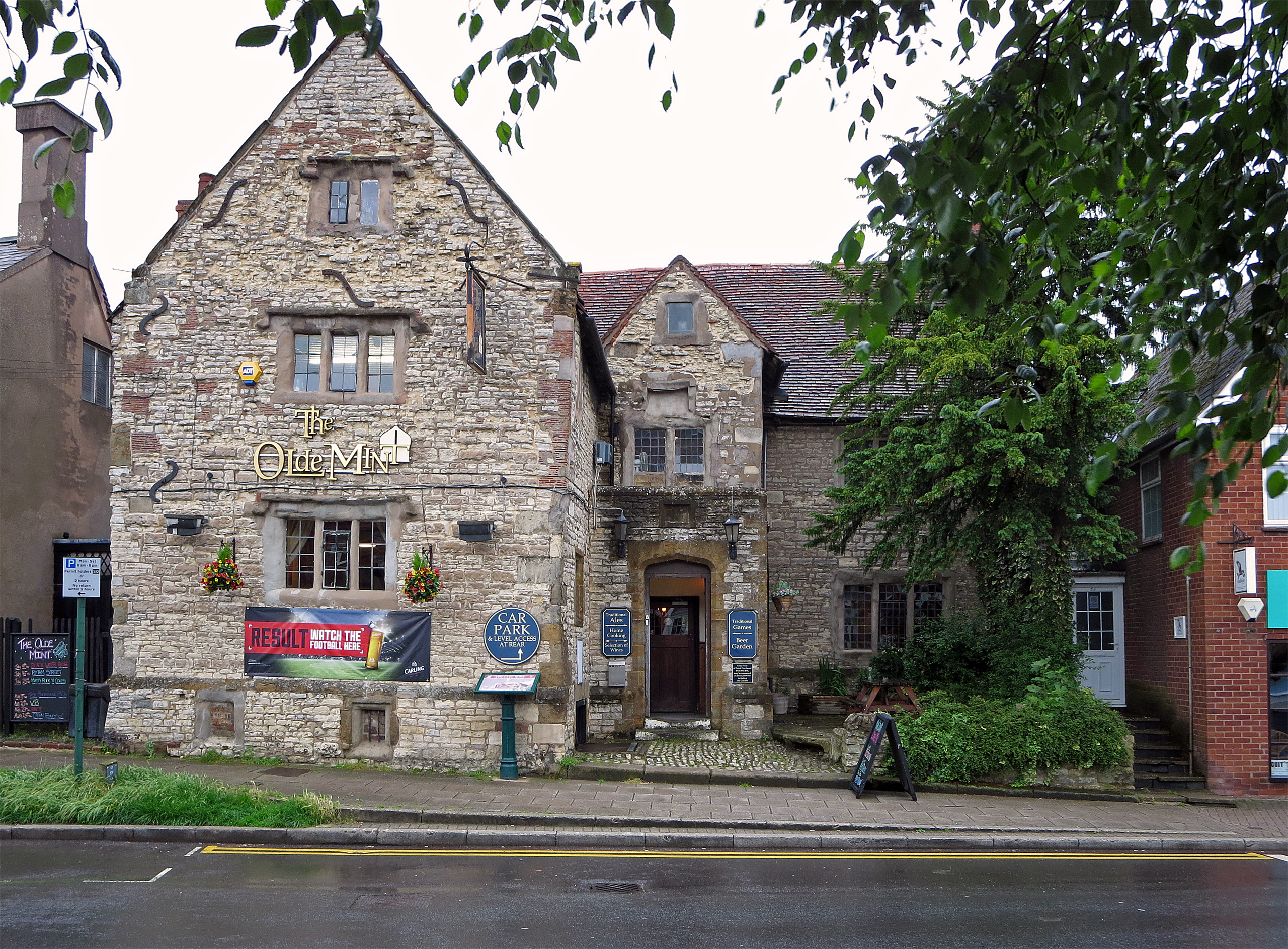
The Olde Mint public house, also 16th century

In the English Civil War, King Charles I used Southam's mint to make new coins to pay his troops. The grade II listed mint building dates from the early 16th century. It is now the Old Mint public house.

Charles I passed through Southam just before the outbreak of the Civil War and apparently was not made welcome by the townsfolk, who refused to ring the parish church bells. On 23 August 1642, the day after the King formally declared war on Parliament, a skirmish was fought outside the town between Parliamentary forces led by Lord Brooke and Royalist forces commanded by the Earl of Northampton. The Battle of Southam is claimed by locals to have been the first battle of the English Civil Wars. Later that year, Charles stayed at the Manor House in Southam before the Battle of Edgehill on 23 October 1642. In 1645 Oliver Cromwell and 7,000 Parliamentary troops stayed in the town.

In the stagecoach era Southam became an important stop on the coach road between Coventry and Oxford. Many old coaching inns remain in the town. However, few buildings in Southam date from before 1741, when a large fire devastated the town.

RAF Southam, about 0.6 miles (1 km) east of the town, was a World War II airfield. It was opened in 1940 and closed at the end of 1944. It was a training base and a relief landing ground.

Southam's history is commemorated in Southam's Cardall Collection.

=== Historic population ===
Year	Population
1801	935
1911	1,804
1961	2,212
2001	6,509
2021	8,114

== Geography ==
Southam is 9 1/2 miles (15.3 km) south-west of Rugby and 9 1/2 miles (15.3 km) west of Daventry, 13 miles (21 km) south-southeast of Coventry and 14 miles (23 km) north of Banbury.

Southam is situated on the River Stowe, a tributary of the River Itchen, which flows from Napton-on-the-Hill and joins the Itchen at Stoneythorpe, just outside the town.

== Economy ==
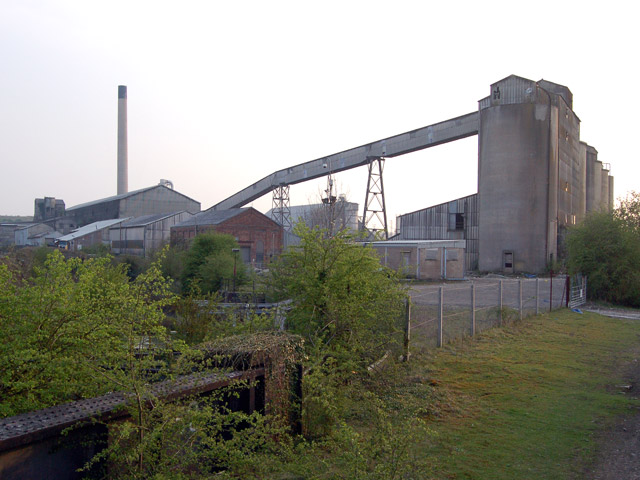
The former Southam cement works, demolished in 2011

The dominant rock type for the area is Blue Lias limestone. For many years there was a cement factory and associated limestone quarry 1 mile (1.6 km) north of the town. The works was served at one time by both rail and canal transport — the latter being a short arm from the Grand Union Canal. The cement operations at Southam were owned by the Rugby Cement company. In 2000 cement production was relocated to Rugby, and Southam cement works was closed, but quarrying at the site still continues. The former cement works was demolished in 2011.

Southam is part of the area known as Silicon Spa: the area around Leamington Spa which is known for its concentration of companies involved in the video game industry: The computer games company, Codemasters, is based in Southam, and was founded by two locals. It was Europe's largest privately owned computer games company, until its purchase by Electronic Arts in February 2021.

The railway rolling stock company Vivarail was based in Southam between 2019 and 2023 when it was dissolved.

South of the town is an industrial estate that is a significant source of local employment.

Southam has become a commuter town due to its road links and location. Taxi and minicab firms operate in the area and frequent bus services serve Southam and local villages.

== Politics ==
The principal local authorities administering Southam are Warwickshire County Council and Stratford-on-Avon District Council, each responsible for different aspects of local government. In addition to this, as a civil parish Southam has its own Town Council, which is represented by ten councillors from four wards.

Southam was the seat of the Southam Rural District from 1894 until 1974, when under the Local Government Act 1972 it was made part of Stratford-on-Avon District.

Southam was in the parliamentary constituency of Stratford-on-Avon until the boundary changes approved by Parliament in June 2007 when it became part of the new constituency of Kenilworth and Southam. The constituency was first contested in the 2010 general election.

== Facilities ==
=== Education ===
Southam has three primary schools and a secondary school (Southam College) with 1,643 students on roll from Southam and local villages. There is a leisure centre with swimming pool and gym next to the College on Welsh Road West.

=== Shopping ===
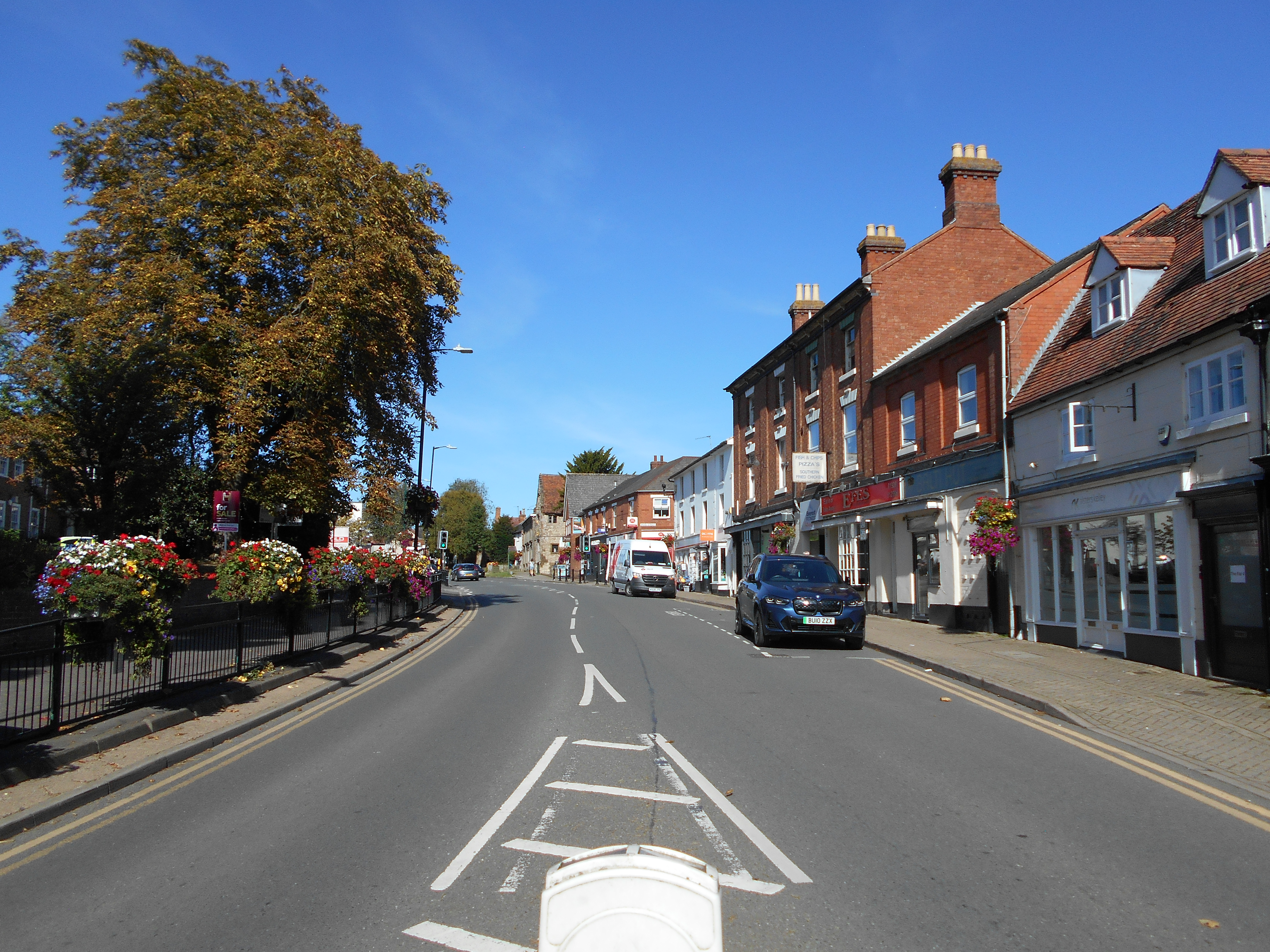
Southam High Street

The main shopping area is based around High Street and Market Hill in the town centre. A French street market has run in High Street since the 1990s, it was restarted again in 2022 after being cancelled due to the COVID-19 pandemic.

=== Religion ===
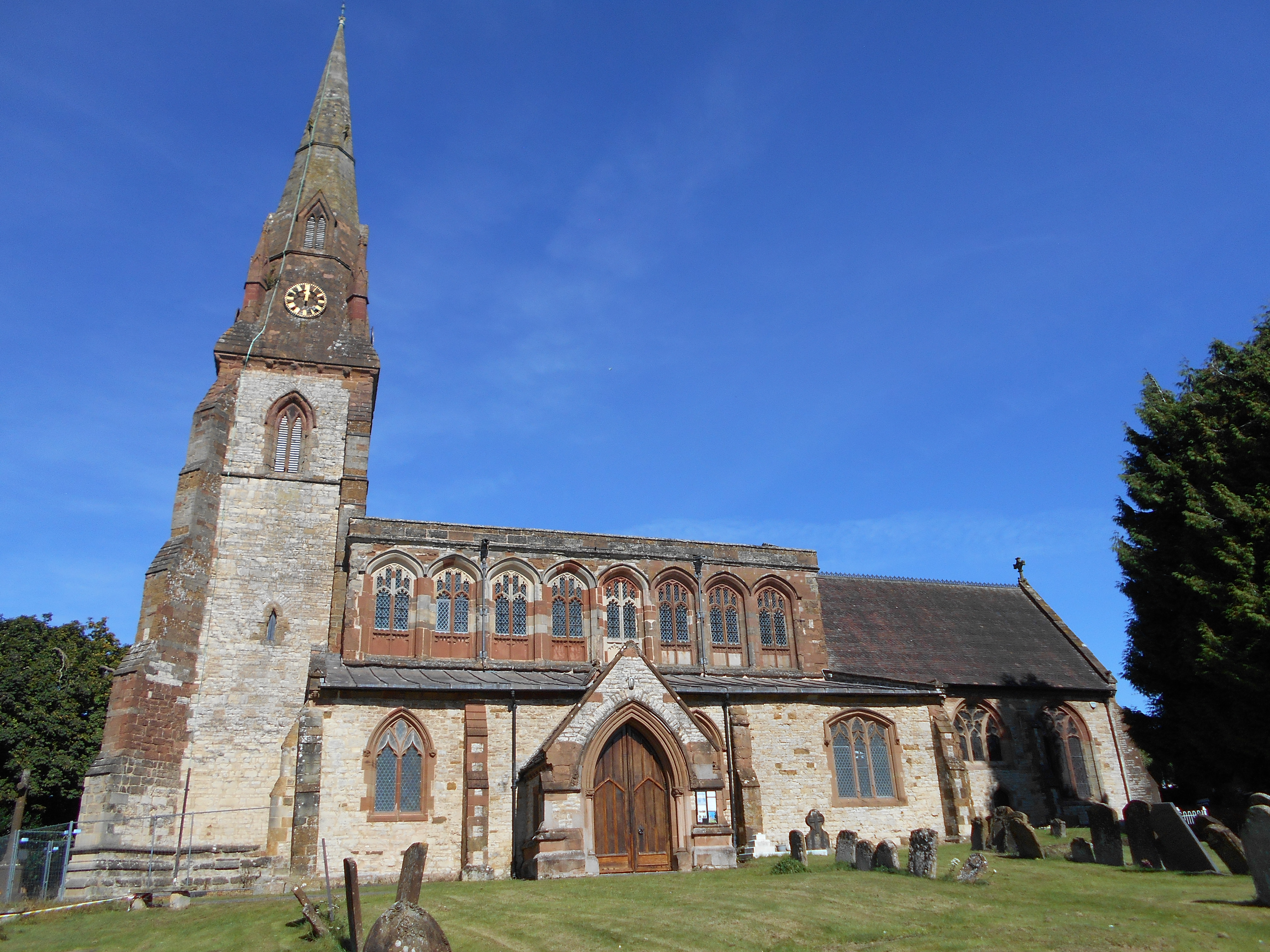
St James' parish church

There are four churches in Southam. St James's parish church is behind Market Hill. Both Our Lady and St Wulstan's Catholic church and the Congregational chapel are on Wood Street, and the Community Church is on Coventry Street. There is also a small but active Bahá´í group in the town. The footpath from St James church along the protected Stowe valley to the historic Holy Well and on to Stoneythorpe Hall is a popular route for local people, ornithologists and other naturalists.

=== Sport and recreation ===
Southam Rugby Club was formed in 1962. In 1969 the club purchased pitches at Kineton Road and started playing home games. Over three years' money was raised to build the club house which was constructed mainly by the players and was opened in 1972. Today the club plays in the Midland League and has three senior teams and a colts team.

Southam United F.C. is the town's association football club, and Southam also has a bowling club, a cricket club and the six pitch Dallas Burston Polo Club which includes conference and events facilities and the Millstone Hare pub and restaurant.

Southam is home to 2028 (Southam) Squadron Air Training Corps, a Royal Air Force-sponsored youth organisation for 13- to 20-year-olds. The squadron is based in Millar House, Wattons Lane.

There is a web of footpaths across fields and through woodland, with minimal need to use roads, giving foot access to surrounding villages.

=== Parks ===
Southam's recreational ground, locally known simply as 'the Rec', is located on Park Lane; the land adjoins St James' churchyard which itself extends to Park Lane, the lower part of Market Hill and the upper part of Warwick Street. The bottom of the park is a bare field used mainly for ball games and the upper part contains various kinds of play equipment, with a separate area for very young children. The second largest park is at Tollgate Road, locally referred to as 'Tollgate'. A small Zoo existed in the town between 1966 and 1985.

== Media ==
Local news and television programmes are provided by BBC West Midlands and ITV Central. Television signals can be received from the Sutton Coldfield TV transmitter. Local radio stations are BBC CWR, Heart West Midlands, Capital Mid-Counties, Hits Radio Coventry & Warwickshire, Fresh (Coventry & Warwickshire) and Greatest Hits Radio Midlands. The town is served by the local newspaper, The Leamington Observer.

== Transport ==
=== Road ===
Southam lies between Leamington Spa and Daventry on the A425 road and between Coventry and Banbury on the A423 road. The A426 road connects it to Rugby. About 7.5 miles (12.1 km) south of Southam is the M40 motorway, though the town is surprisingly not indicated on the Junction 12 signage, despite being the main population centre in the immediate area.

=== Bus ===
Stagecoach Midlands run regular bus services connecting Southam with Leamington, Rugby and some of the local villages: like Napton and Long Itchington.

=== Railway ===
The nearest railway stations are Leamington Spa, Rugby and Banbury.

Southam has never been directly served by its own railway station, although there were two within a few miles of the town: The Great Western Railway opened its line to Birmingham in 1852, and Southam had a station 3 miles (5 km) to the south-west, named Southam Road and Harbury. The station was closed to goods in 1963 and passengers in 1964 by British Railways (BR). The line is now part of the London Marylebone to Birmingham Chiltern Main Line.

The London and North Western Railway completed its Weedon to Marton Junction Line in 1895 and opened Southam and Long Itchington station on it 2 miles (3 km) north of Southam. British Railways closed the station to passengers in 1958 and goods in 1965, although the line remained open to goods trains serving the cement works until 1985.

The new High Speed 2 line will pass immediately south of Southam, but will have no stations between London and Birmingham.

== Notable people ==
- Lieutenant-General Sir Charles Allfrey, British Army commander, veteran of World War I and World War II.
- Steve Beaton, 1996 World Professional Darts Champion.
- Arthur Cox, who managed Newcastle United and Derby County football clubs between 1980 and 1993, was born at Southam in December 1939.
- Richard and David Darling, aka Codemasters, award-winning videogames developer company, founded in 1986 and retains its head office of several hundred employees in Southam.
- Flight Lieutenant Jon Egging, former Air Cadet at 2028 Squadron Air Training Corps, Red Arrows display team pilot during 2009 and 2011 seasons.
- Trina Gulliver, nine times women's World Professional Darts Champion, who moved to Somerset in 2008.
- Henry Lilley Smith (1787/88 – 1859) founded a cottage hospital, Southam Dispensary, in 1823.
- Steve Walwyn, guitarist with Dr. Feelgood, was born in Southam in 1956.
- Justin Welby, former Archbishop of Canterbury, was earlier in his clergy career Rector of Southam.
- Adam Woodyatt, EastEnders actor, had a home in Southam for many years.

== Twin towns ==
Southam has been twinned with Marolles-en-Hurepoix in France since 1992.

== Sources ==
- Allen, Geoff (2000). Warwickshire Towns and Villages. Ammanford: Sigma Leisure. pp. not cited. ISBN 1-85058-642-X.
- Pevsner, Nikolaus; Wedgwood, Alexandra (1966). Warwickshire. The Buildings of England. Harmondsworth: Penguin Books. p. 403.
- Salzman, L.F., ed. (1951). A History of the County of Warwick, Volume 6: Knightlow hundred. Victoria County History. pp. 219–226.
