= A426 road =

Cross-country road in England

Coordinates: 52.43851°N 1.20197°W

A426

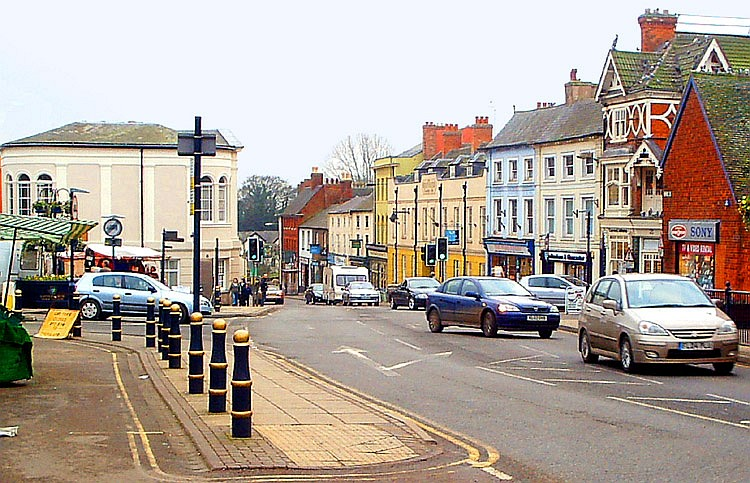
- The A426 in Lutterworth

Route information
- Length: 29 mi (47 km)

Major junctions
- North end: Leicester
- A594 road A563 A4303; A5; M6 J1 A428 A4071 A423
- South end: Southam

Location
- Country: United Kingdom
- Primary destinations: Leicester, Rugby

Road network
- Roads in the United Kingdom; Motorways; A and B road zones

The A426 road is a road in England. It runs from the city of Leicester to the market town of Southam in Warwickshire via the towns of Lutterworth and Rugby.

== History ==
Until the M1 motorway was completed in the 1960s this route formed the main route between Rugby and Leicester; but since that time it has become much quieter, for all but local traffic uses the motorway. However, the local traffic has increased as Magna Park, a prominent East Midlands warehouse facility, has developed close to Lutterworth. Broughton Astley, a couple of miles north-west of Dunton Bassett, and other local villages can often become congested with goods vehicles en route between Magna Park, the M1 motorway and the M6 motorway. At rush hours the road can become gridlocked and reduced to less than 40 mph, in particular for the reason that agricultural traffic frequently uses the stretch. Hence, journeys between Blaby and Rugby during rush hour can take much longer than anticipated.

The A426 crosses the route of the former A45 in Dunchurch; this formed one of the main routes between the Midlands and the South East. Dunchurch is now bypassed to the south by the M45 motorway, and the A426 no longer meets the A45.

== Route ==
The A426 begins on the Leicester Inner Ring Road and heads south through the suburbs of the city, crossing the Outer Ring Road and bypassing the village of Blaby. It crosses over the M1, to which it runs parallel for the next 10 miles (16 km) or so. The road becomes rural in nature until it enters the small town of Lutterworth and crosses the A4303 Southern Bypass. A further 2 miles (3.2 km) south, it crosses the A5 Watling Street at the Gibbet Roundabout, and eventually the M6 junction 1. It begins a descent into Rugby as a dual carriageway, with five local access roundabouts. Approaching the town centre, the road becomes single-carriageway again and crosses under the West Coast Main Line. It passes the main town centre to the west and heads southward out of the town towards Dunchurch, after which it passes over the M45 and again becomes a rural road for its final stretch, terminating at the A423 Southam bypass.

== Former routes ==
The A426, compared to other routes is a relatively untouched road, with only a single bypass:

- The road used to travel through the village of Blaby, which is now bypassed.

== Bus corridor ==
A controversial 2012 decision to allow a bus corridor to be constructed on the A426 from Blaby into Leicester was given the go-ahead, despite heavy local opposition.
