= Braunston London Road railway station =

Former railway station in Northamptonshire, England

Braunston London Road
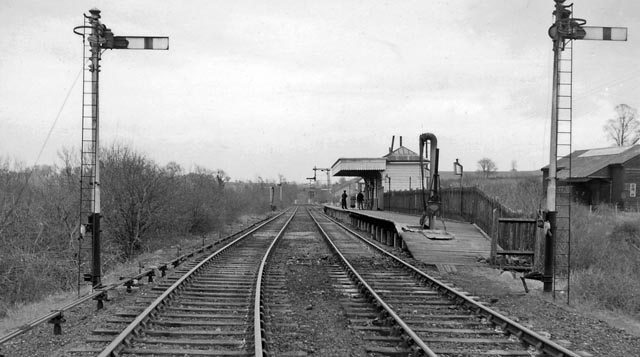
- The station after closure in 1962

General information
- Location: Braunston, West Northamptonshire; England
- Coordinates: 52.2869°N 1.2091°W
- Platforms: 2 (later just one)

Other information
- Status: Disused

History
- Original company: London and North Western Railway
- Pre-grouping: London and North Western Railway

Key dates
- 1 August 1895: Station opened as Braunston
- 1 July 1950: Renamed Braunston London Road
- 15 September 1958: Station closes for passengers
Location

Braunston London Road was one of two railway stations that served the village of Braunston in Northamptonshire, England. The station was built on the Weedon to Leamington Spa branch line on an embankment next to the village's wharf on the Grand Union Canal after the demolition of a number of houses and a pub that were in the way.

The station opened along with the Leamington extension of the Weedon line on 1 August 1895. It was on a passing loop and originally had two platforms with an underpass linking them, however the second platform was later taken out of use and removed, so trains in both directions called at the same platform, although the loop was retained for goods traffic until the line closed.

The station was originally known as just Braunston, however it was renamed as Braunston London Road in 1950, to differentiate it from the other station serving the village. Despite its small size, Braunston was also served by Braunston and Willoughby station on the former Great Central Main Line, which served Braunston and the village of Willoughby, which it was closer to.

The line closed to passengers in 1958, and freight in 1963.

During demolishment in 1960s, they only removed the buildings, track, and platforms, leaving all of the other structures. The area slowly became a woods with visibly smaller trees where the tracks once were. Although the remains can still be seen.

Preceding station	Disused railways	Following station
Daventry; Line and station closed	London and North Western Railway; Weedon to Leamington Spa line	Flecknoe; Line and station closed

== Layout ==
Braunston London Road had two 109 metre long and 3 metre wide platforms on either side of a passing loop. Though a lot of rural branch line halts were made of wooden trestles, Braunston’s platforms had concrete edges with wooden trestles capped with stones, as well as paved and gravelled surfaces, making Braunston more permanent and sturdier than most halts. The timber framed station buildings on the down (southbound) and up (northbound) platforms were also more permanent, as they had slate roof overhangs and measured 24 by 4.5 metres. An even smaller building was situated to the east of the north platform.

On the north side of the station was the original signal box, which measured 5 by 4 metres. The south platform had a new signal box which was not integrated into the station, after the north platform was taken out around 1956.

Three sidings and a goods shed were located south east of the station’s platforms. The south platform was accessible by a footpath from the A45 to the two covered flights of steps, which had roofs of corrugated iron. Near the bottom of the rail steps a subway underpass connected both sides by going under the rail embankment.
