= Willoughby, Warwickshire =

Village in Warwickshire, England

Coordinates: 52.303°N 1.244°W

Willoughby
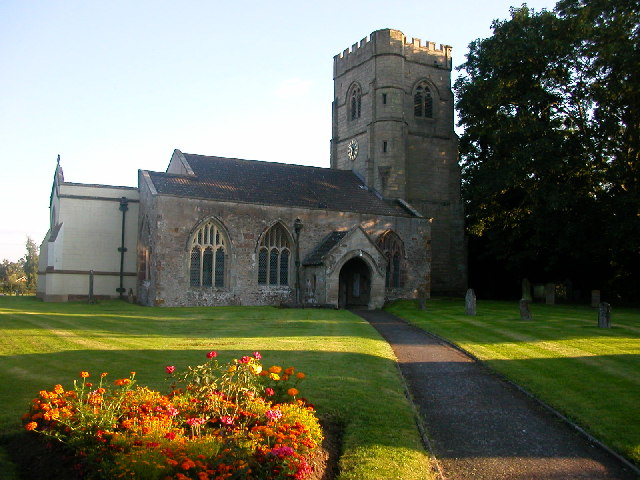
- St Nicholas' parish church

- Location within Warwickshire
- Population: 398 (2011 census)
- OS grid reference: SP5167
- Civil parish: Willoughby
- District: Rugby
- Shire county: Warwickshire
- Region: West Midlands
- Country: England
- Sovereign state: United Kingdom
- Post town: Rugby
- Postcode district: CV23
- Dialling code: 01788
- Police: Warwickshire
- Fire: Warwickshire
- Ambulance: West Midlands
- UK Parliament: Kenilworth and Southam
- Website: Willoughby, a Warwickshire Village

Willoughby is a village and civil parish about 5 miles (8 km) south of Rugby, Warwickshire, England. The village is about 4.5 miles (7 km) northwest of Daventry in neighbouring Northamptonshire and the eastern boundary of the parish forms part of the county boundary.

Willoughby's toponym is derived from Old Norse Viligbýr meaning "willow farmstead".

The parish is bounded to the south by the River Leam and to the west by one of its tributaries. The village is just west of the main road between Daventry and Coventry, now the A45 road.

The 2011 census recorded a parish population of 398.

== Manor ==
Before the Norman Conquest of England Willoughby comprised five small estates. Ordric held two hides, Leuiet and Goduin held half a hide and Ulvric held three small estates totalling one and a half virgates. The Domesday Book of 1086 records that the tenants still held their respective holdings, with Turchil of Warwick as their feudal landlord, but also the Norman baron Hugh de Grandmesnil held one and one sixth hides at Willoughby and Hillmorton.

Henry I (reigned 1100–35) granted the Grandmesnil estates at Willoughby and Shrewley to a man called Wigan in return for service. Wigan's son Ralph died by 1215 and the estate eventually descended to Ralph's brother William and nephew Ivo. By 1242 Ivo had died without an heir so his uncle Thurstan enfeoffed his 10 virgates at Willoughby to the Hospital of St John the Baptist, Oxford. The Augustinian Canons Ashby Priory in Northamptonshire also had an interest in the manor of Willoughby so the master of the hospital had to give the prior 50 marks of silver. However, landowners made further grants of land to the hospital and by 1316 it held the lordship of the manor.

In 1457 William Waynflete, Bishop of Winchester founded Magdalen College, Oxford on the site of the Hospital of St John the Baptist. All of the hospital's endowments were transferred to the new college, and remained in its possession until the 20th century.

== Parish church ==
Willoughby's parish church dates from 1215 at the latest. The font has Early English Gothic carvings on its rim and dates from 1230. Thurstan had granted the advowson to the Hospital of St John the Baptist by 1246. However, the present Church of England parish church of Saint Nicholas is a Perpendicular Gothic building dating entirely from the early part of the 16th century. It has north and south aisles and arcades with characteristically late-Perpendicular four-centred arches. The chancel was later rebuilt in brick, probably early in the 19th century. St Nicholas' is a Grade II* listed building.

The tower has a clock that may date from early in the 17th century. It has also a ring of six bells. Joseph Smith of Edgbaston cast five of them in 1713; William Chapman of the Whitechapel Bell Foundry cast the tenor bell in 1781.

St Nicholas' parish is now part of a single benefice with the parishes of Flecknoe, Grandborough, Leamington Hastings and Birdingbury.

== Economic and social history ==
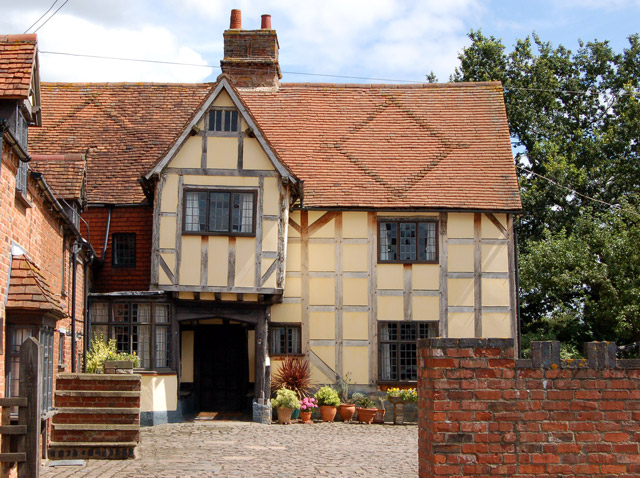
Vale House, a 17th-century timber-framed house in Lower Street

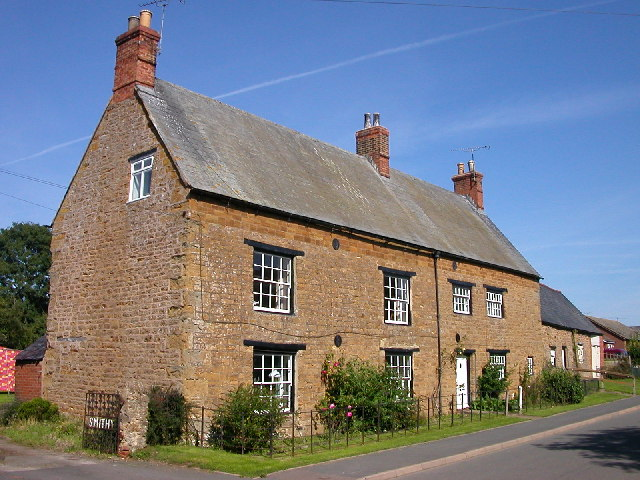
The Smithy, an 18th-century ironstone house in Main Street

In 1248 the Hospital of St John the Baptist was granted the right to hold a weekly market at Willoughby every Tuesday and a two-day annual fair at Whitsun. The Tuesday market was still held in the 1830s.

Pye Court was originally Pie Court and was the seat of the Court of Pie Powder. This was a court associated with the market whose business included licensing hawkers and punishing acts of misdemeanour or nuisance.

In October 1642 Parliamentarian troops on the way to the battle of Edge Hill tried to pull down an ancient cross in Willoughby but were dissuaded by the Vicar. It may have been a market cross or a preaching cross.

Construction of the Oxford Canal began north of Coventry in 1769 and was dug through Willoughby parish, reaching Napton-on-the-Hill by 1774. The canal passes east of Willoughby village and Willoughby Wharf was established 1/2-mile (800 m) northeast of the village where the road to Barby, Northamptonshire crosses the canal. Between 1794 and 1805 the rival Grand Junction Canal was built from Braunston to Brentford, with a wharf at Braunston competing with the Oxford's wharf at Willoughby. However, in the Act of Parliament authorising the Grand Junction the Oxford succeeded in obtaining a clause to levy "bar tolls" from the Grand Junction to compensate for any loss of trade from Willoughby Wharf.

Willoughby had a post office by 1865. It closed on 22 May 2002.

Willoughby Cricket Club was founded in 1901 and Willoughby Women's Institute was founded in 1920.

=== Railway ===
In the late 1890s the Great Central Main Line was built from the north of England to London Marylebone. It passed north–south through the parish, passing under the road to Barby on the west side of the canal wharf and over the Daventry – Coventry main road just east of the village. The new main line crossed the River Leam on a 13-arch viaduct almost 1 mile (1.6 km) south of the village. This was called Willoughby Viaduct but the site is not in the parish and half of it is not even in Warwickshire.

The Great Central Railway opened the line in March 1899 with a station at the village named "Willoughby for Daventry". In 1904 the GCR renamed the station "Braunston and Willoughby for Daventry". Both names were rather optimistic, as Daventry is 4.5 miles (7 km) away, Braunston is 1 mile (1.6 km) away and both had their own stations on a branch of the London and North Western Railway. In 1938 the GCR's successor the London and North Eastern Railway renamed the station Braunston and Willoughby. British Railways closed the station in April 1957 and the line in September 1966. Little remains of the station itself but the Station Master's red-brick house survives.

== Amenities ==
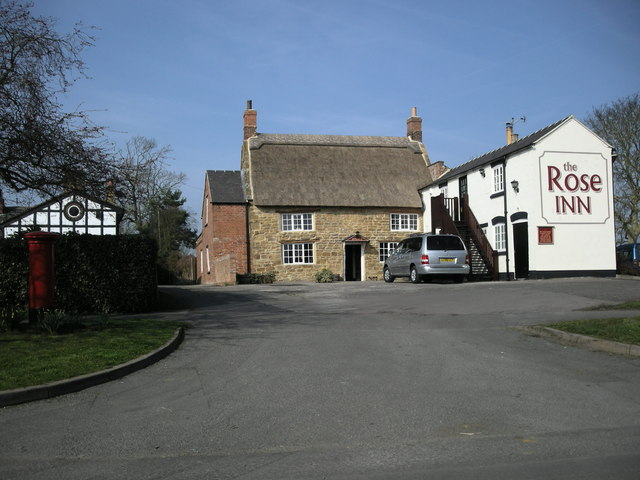
The Rose Inn

Willoughby has an 18th-century public house, The Rose Inn. The parish had three other pubs including the Four Crosses Inn and the Navigation. The Four Crosses has been turned into apartments and the other two former pubs are now private houses.

Willoughby has a hair salon and other retail businesses.
