= Braunston Cleves or Fawcliff =

- Lost Settlement
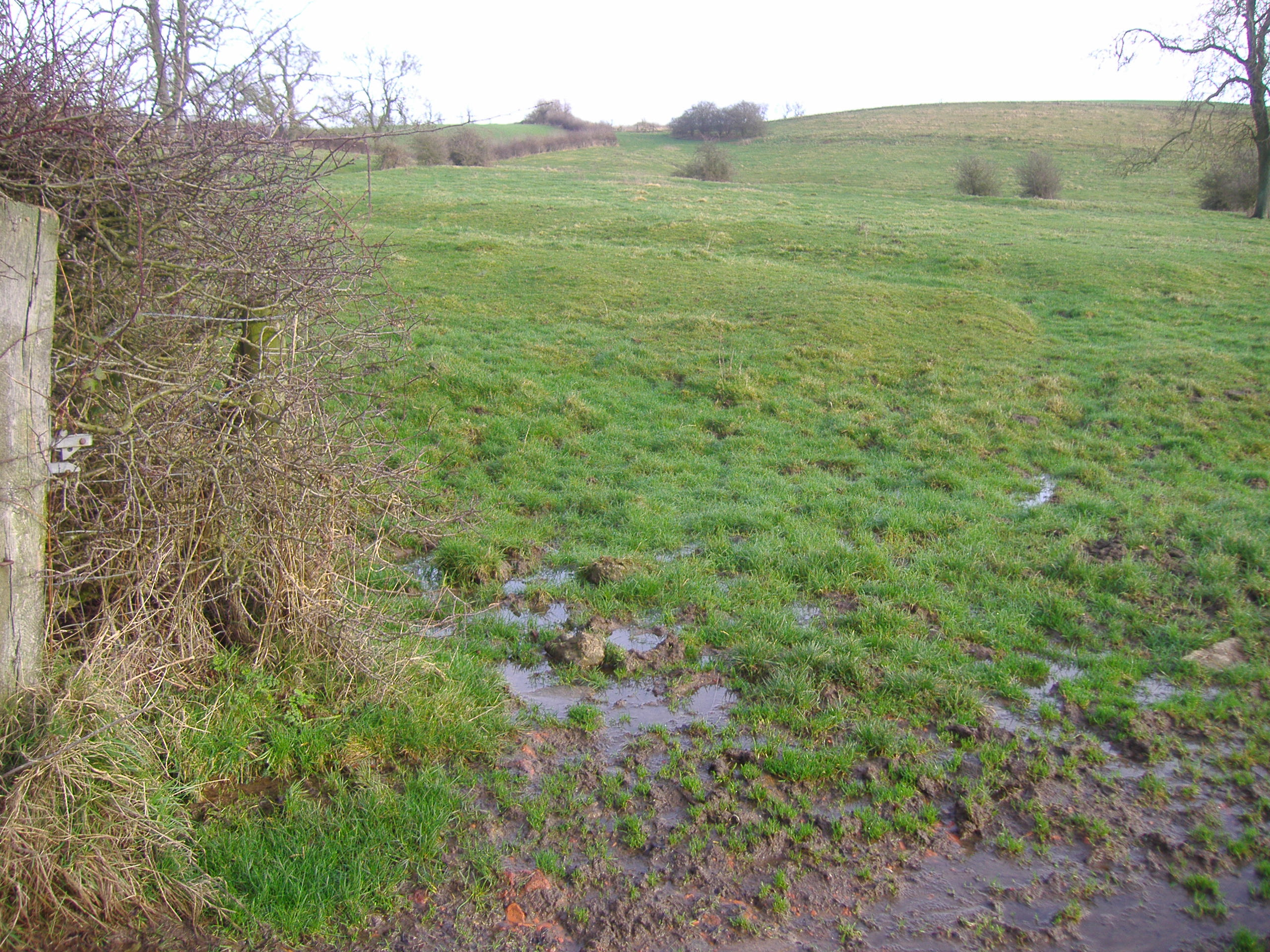
- Cleve’s Hill, the site of Braunston Cleves also known as Fawcliff

- Braunston Cleves or Fawcliff within Northamptonshire
- Coordinates: 52°18′30″N 1°12′10″W
- Country: England
- State: Northamptonshire
- Region: East Midlands
- District: Daventry
- Municipality: Braunston
- Map Ref: SP544682

The village of Braunston Cleves or Fawcliff is a deserted medieval village that stood north of the village of Braunston in the English county of Northamptonshire at its border with Warwickshire.

It has long been a "lost village", having no standing buildings, but its position and the topography of its street and houses can be traced from the irregularities of the ground where it once stood. It was on the southwest slope of Cleve's Hill within Braunston parish and appears to have been occupied in late Anglo-Saxon and early post-Conquest times. It is unknown why the village was deserted, but it had certainly been destroyed by the 18th century.

== History ==
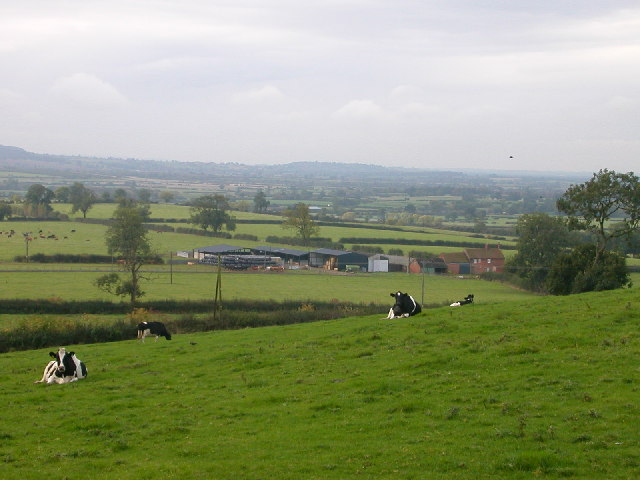
The settlement stood in a valley below this hill

The history of this settlement is virtually unknown. It is thought that the settlement lay within the manor at Braunston which, at the time of the Domesday Survey (1086), belonged to Walter de Aincurt. This passed to William Trussbutt (whose family held a barony seated in Yorkshire and Lincolnshire), and was divided between his three daughters.

Two other deserted village sites, named Braunstonbury and Wolfhampcote, exist within the immediate vicinity of Braunston, and were possibly part of the same manor. There is also an existing hamlet called Little Braunston.

The settlement called Fawcliff descended to Agatha Trussbutt, then wife of Hamo the grandson of Meinfelin (whose barony was seated at Wolverton, Buckinghamshire). After Hamo's death she remarried to William de Albini, who paid a fine to enjoy her lands, and she lived down to 1247. She thus outlived her sister Hilary (died 1241), who gave her share of the manor (including at least part of Braunstonbury) to Lilleshall Abbey in Shropshire.

== Remains today ==
The remains of the village can be found at the head of a small valley where there is a spring.

The village stood on the west bank of the water course. There is a series of depressions and platforms which were probably the sites of dwellings. Below the stream at the southern end of the site there are several ditched enclosures along which the stream flows today.
