= Braunston and Willoughby railway station =

Former railway station in Warwickshire, England

Coordinates: 52.29953°N 1.23301°W

Braunston and Willoughby
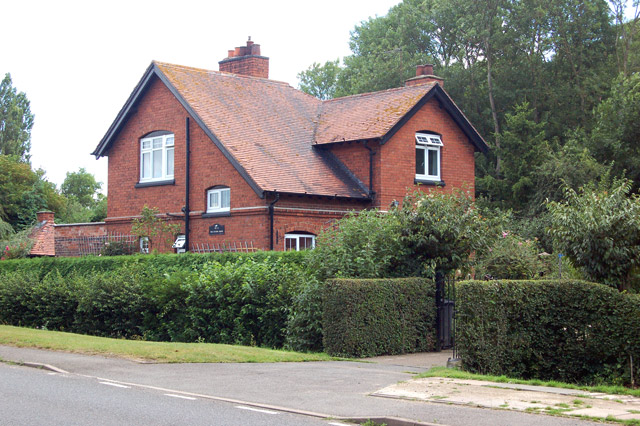
- Stationmaster's House in July 2009.

General information
- Location: Willoughby, Rugby; England
- Grid reference: SP524671
- Platforms: 2

Other information
- Status: Disused

History
- Original company: Great Central Railway
- Pre-grouping: Great Central Railway
- Post-grouping: London and North Eastern Railway; London Midland Region of British Railways

Key dates
- 15 March 1899: Opened as Willoughby for Daventry
- 1 January 1904: Renamed Braunston and Willoughby for Daventry
- 1938: Renamed Braunston and Willoughby
- 1 April 1957: Closed
Location

Braunston and Willoughby railway station was a station on the former Great Central Main Line. It served the small village of Willoughby which it was located next to, and the larger but more distant village of Braunston. The station opened with the line on 15 March 1899.

== History ==
The station was one of the standard island platform design typical of the London Extension, though here it was the less common "embankment" type reached from a roadway (the A45 Coventry to Daventry road), that passed beneath the line.

The station was situated close to the village of Willoughby, Warwickshire, and was originally known as Willoughby for Daventry although Daventry itself was some five miles to the south east in Northamptonshire and already had a station of its own on another line (the London & North Western branch line from Weedon to Leamington Spa). Braunston, also in Northamptonshire, lay between the two, some two miles away and also served by the same LNWR branch that ran through Daventry, but it was Braunston that was found to be providing the new Great Central station with the bulk of its usage. This was reflected in a renaming on 1 January 1904 to Braunston and Willoughby for Daventry (the for Daventry was eventually dropped in 1938).

Braunston and Willoughby station closed to passengers and goods on 1 April 1957 and the line itself closed on 5 September 1966. The station buildings had already been removed in 1961-2 although the platform remained for a while longer. Today there is little left to see at the site. The twin bridges over the A45 have been removed and the abutment walls substantially lowered. The stationmaster's house remains, however. A short distance to the south of the station was the 13-arch Willoughby Viaduct crossing the River Leam: this viaduct has now gone.

The other line passing through the area - the former LNWR Weedon to Leamington Spa branch line, via Daventry, closed on 15 September 1958.

== Route ==
Preceding station	Disused railways	Following station
Charwelton; Line and station closed	Great Central Railway; London Extension	Rugby Central; Line and station closed
