= Flecknoe railway station =

Former railway station in England

Coordinates: 52.2759°N 1.2724°W

Flecknoe
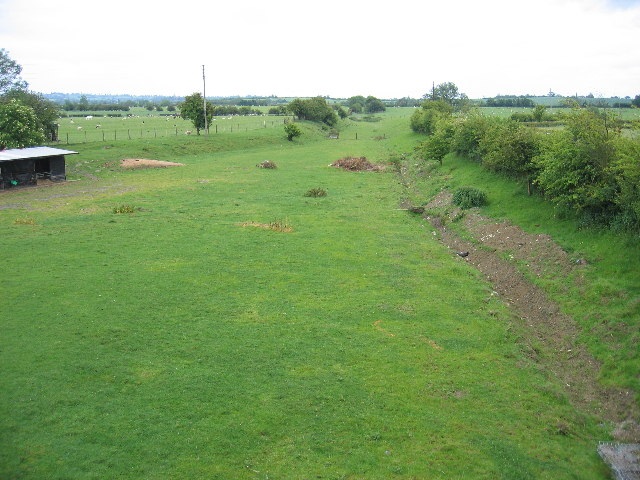
- The cutting where Flecknoe station stood, in 2005.

General information
- Location: Flecknoe, Warwickshire; England
- Platforms: 1

Other information
- Status: Disused

History
- Pre-grouping: London and North Western Railway
- Post-grouping: London and North Western Railway

Key dates
- 1 August 1895: Station opens
- 1 August 1917: station closes
- 1 March 1919: station re-opens
- 3 November 1952: Station closes to passengers
- October 1956: Station closes to freight
Location

Flecknoe was a railway station that served the village of Flecknoe in Warwickshire, England, on the Weedon to Leamington Spa branch line. The station was built in a remote location in open countryside around 1.5 miles north-west of Flecknoe, it also served the small nearby hamlets of Sawbridge and Lower Shuckburgh, both within a couple of miles of the station.

The station consisted of a single wooden platform with a wooden station building, which contained the waiting room and stationmaster's office. There were also some small goods sidings alongside the station.

The station was opened on 1 August 1895 along with the other stations on the Daventry to Marton Junction extension of the line. It was closed during the First World War from August 1917 to March 1919. The station's remote location and low usage meant that it closed to passengers on 3 November 1952, however, the goods sidings remained open for business until October 1956. The passenger service to the other stations on the line survived until 1958, and line survived carrying freight until 2 December 1963.

Nothing now remains of the station, as all of the station buildings have long since disappeared, however the cutting where the station stood is still clearly visible, spanned by a road bridge from which the site can be seen. A row of cottages which once housed railway workers stands a short distance to the north of the road bridge.

Preceding station	Disused railways	Following station
Braunston; Line and station closed	London and North Western Railway; Weedon to Leamington Spa line	Napton and Stockton; Line and station closed
