= Braunston =

Village in Northamptonshire, England

Coordinates: 52.292°N 1.209°W

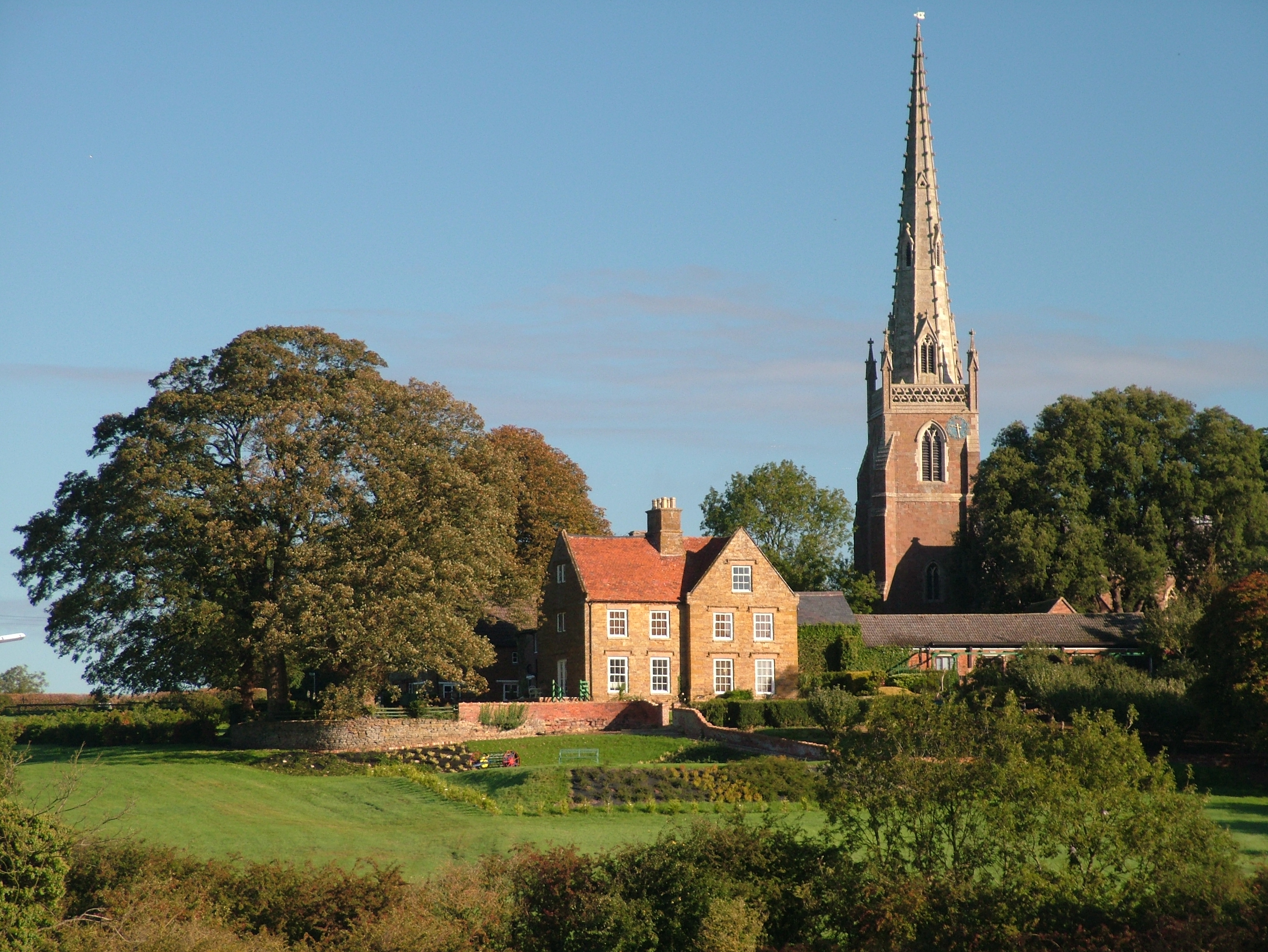
- All Saints' Church and Braunston Manor

- Location within Northamptonshire
- Population: 1,759 (2011 Census)
- OS grid reference: SP5366
- Civil parish: Braunston
- Unitary authority: West Northamptonshire
- Ceremonial county: Northamptonshire
- Region: East Midlands
- Country: England
- Sovereign state: United Kingdom
- Post town: DAVENTRY
- Postcode district: NN11
- Dialling code: 01788
- Police: Northamptonshire
- Fire: Northamptonshire
- Ambulance: East Midlands
- UK Parliament: Daventry

Braunston is a village and civil parish in the West Northamptonshire unitary authority area of Northamptonshire, England, next to the border with Warwickshire. At the 2011 Census, the parish had a population of 1,759, which increased in 2021 to 1,821. Braunston is situated just off the A45 main road and lies between the towns of Daventry and Rugby. Braunston is a hilltop village, most famous for its canal junction between the Oxford Canal and the Grand Union Canal, and associated marina.

== Description ==
The village's name means 'Brant's farm/settlement'.

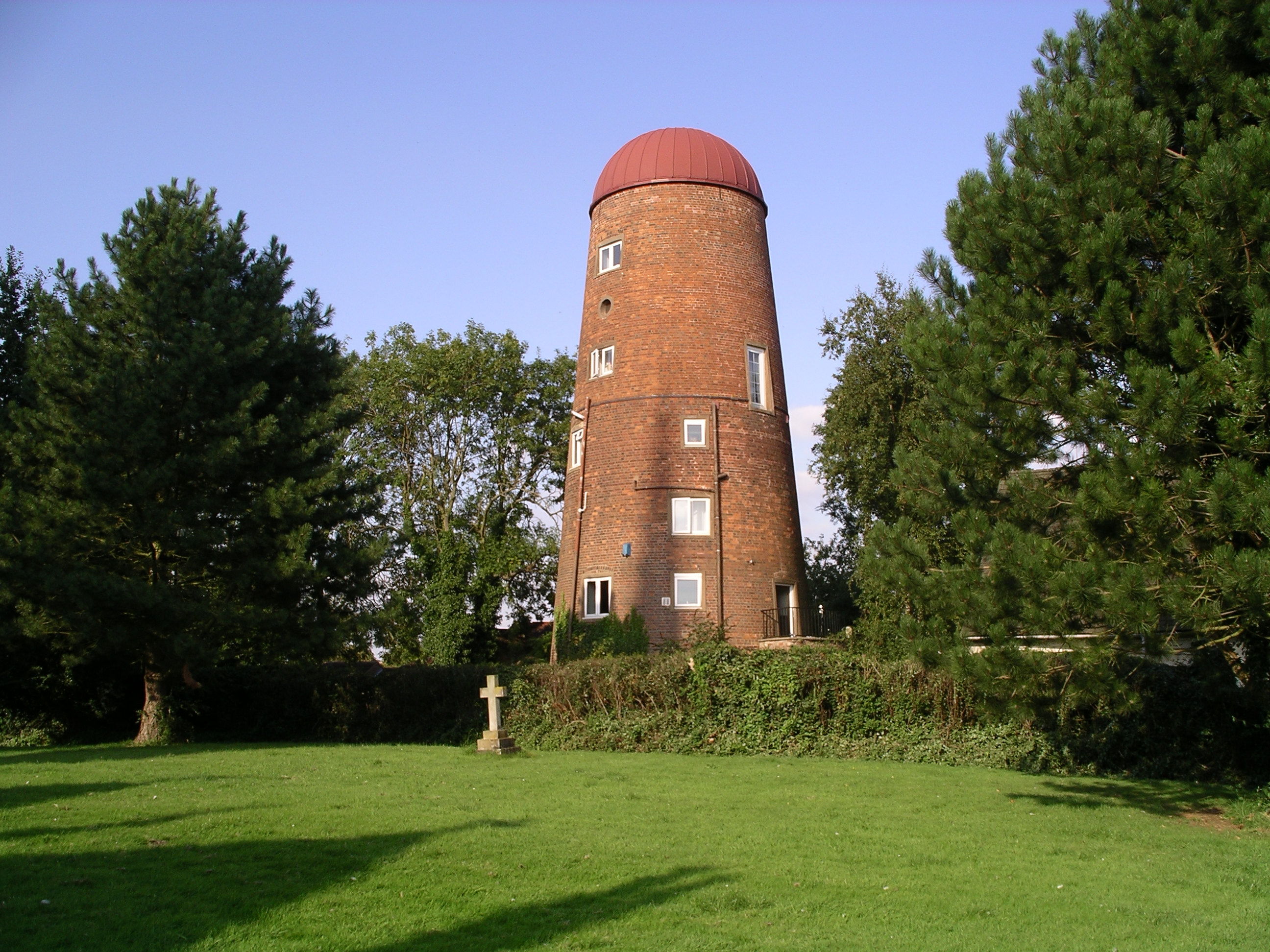
The former windmill in Braunston

The main village of Braunston is situated on a hill above the road and the canals, and formerly had a windmill, the building of which still stands but without any sails. The village contains several pubs (The Boathouse, The Admiral Nelson, The Plough, and The Wheatsheaf), a selection of shops, including a village store incorporating the post office, a hairdressers, a fish and chip shop, a car servicing garage and a primary school. The Braunston Manor Hotel has now closed with the main house reverting to residential use and the outhouse buildings redeveloped for a housing development. In 1374, the manor itself was the subject of one of a number of property disputes involving the landowning Corbet family.

Braunston's main claims to fame are its canal and church.

== Church ==
All Saints' Church Braunston has overlooked the village and the villagers for over 10 centuries and the canals and the boat people for over 300 years.

Otherwise known as the "Cathedral of the Canals", it has existed since the early 13th century. However, the land on which it stands has been sacred for longer still, as it was used as an ancient tumulus for the local farmsteads as early as the 10th century, although little evidence to this time is available.

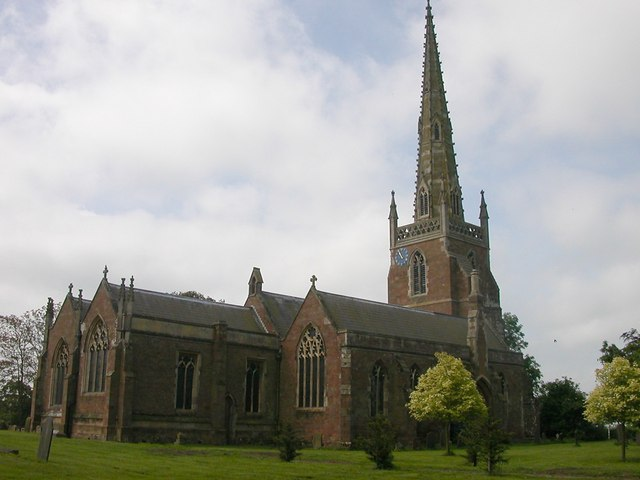
All Saints Church

Although the original Norman structure was nearly demolished when the site was polluted by several murders in 1290, the church was later rebuilt in the 14th century. The second incarnation of the church served the area for over 400 years, until the site was demolished, with authority from Rev. Alfred Butler Clough in 1848, due to dilapidation of the structure.

The third incarnation of the church cost £6,800, money raised primarily through donations and aided by grants from the Church Building Society and the Peterborough Diocesan Society. Notable contributors to the funds also include Her Majesty the Queen Dowager and the Oxford Canal Company.

In outline the new church was similar to its mediaeval predecessor in having no north chancel. The body of the church was made wider to provide accommodation for the enlarged population which had followed the coming of the canals. The new church had the number of seats increased from 363 to 732. Despite the overwhelming impression of space and light the interior design of the church was rather austere. The biggest change made was in the appearance of the chancel itself which was transformed by redecoration. This was the work of the leading High Church designer, William Butterfield, architect of Rugby School.

Today the church still provides regular services to the area, and often allows visitors to tour the ancient grounds, on non-service days. Several relics have been kept by the church since its original incarnation, such as:

- A sculpture, almost certainly in memory of William, Fourth Baron Ros, who died on a pilgrimage to the Holy Land in 1352. The De Ros family held the Braunston Manor from 1200 to 1508.
- The Church Chest, which once housed the Parish Records dating from 1538 and now deposited in the County Records Office in Northampton.
- The Norman Font, the only remaining part of the first church on the site.
- The Piscina, a stone basin used for draining water used in the Mass pre-Reformation.
- The Head of the Churchyard Cross, possibly fourteenth century which has on the four sides the remains of carvings of the Crucifixion, the Madonna and Child, a robed ecclesiastic and a warrior.

== Canals ==
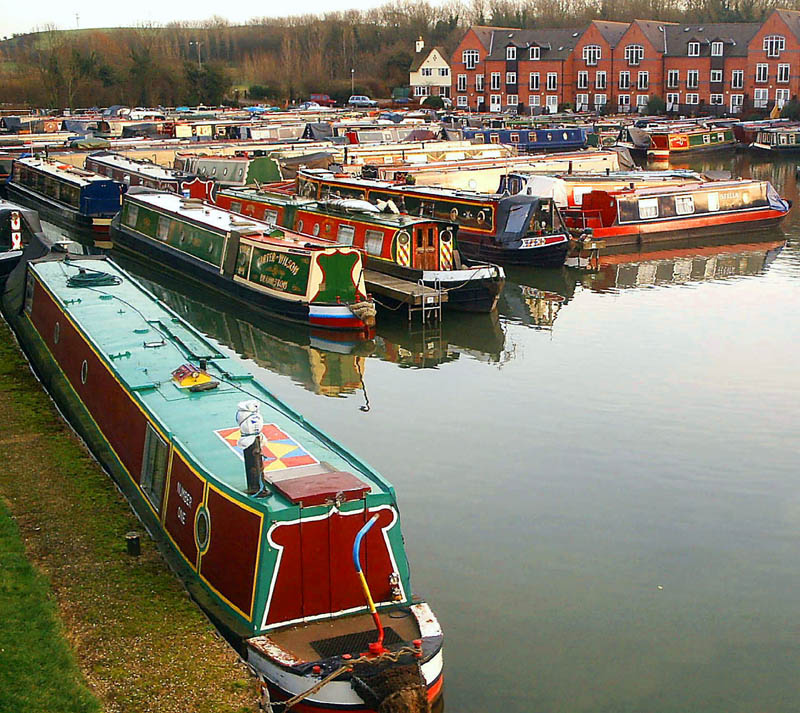
The marina at Braunston

The canal alongside Braunston is a junction between the Oxford Canal and the Grand Union Canal, which was once an important part of the national transport system. Many former boating families have links to Braunston, the churchyard in the village having many graves of boatmen and women.

The village thrived for over 150 years on the canal trade - carrying goods from the Midlands to London. Now it is a centre for leisure activities and boasts by far and away the busiest stretch of canal anywhere in the country.

The unique triangular junction between the two canals has two bridges made at Horseley Ironworks carrying the towpath over the canal. This was not the original meeting point of the Grand Junction and Oxford Canals: the junction was moved in the course of improvements to the Oxford Canal in the 1830s, prior to which the junction was near where the marina is today, and where a third Horseley Ironworks bridge can be seen.

The canals are no longer used for carrying freight, but are now used mostly by pleasure boats. Braunston has a marina filled with these pleasure boats and is usually quite busy.

From the marina, six locks carry the Grand Union Canal up to Braunston Tunnel, some 2,049 yards (1,874 m) long.

== Railways ==
Despite its small size, Braunston was once served by two railway stations, both now closed. The first, Braunston London Road was on the former LNWR Weedon to Leamington Spa branch line, via Daventry, was located near the marina and closed in September 1958. A couple of miles north-west of Braunston was Braunston and Willoughby station on the former Great Central Main Line, which served Braunston and the village of Willoughby, which it was closer to. This was the last main line to be constructed from the north of England to London and opened in March 1899. Braunston and Willoughby station closed in April 1957 and the line itself in September 1966. To the south of the station was the 13-arch Willoughby viaduct crossing the River Leam: the viaduct was demolished about 1980.

== Braunston Primary School ==
Braunston C.E. Primary School is located in the middle of the village. It is a one form entry school and has one class for each age group from Reception to Year 6, with the capacity for 30 children in each class. The curriculum is divided up into stages according to age: Foundation Stage – The Reception Class, Key Stage 1 - Years 1 and 2, Key Stage 2 - Years 3, 4, 5 and 6.

== Nearby settlements ==
Nearby is the small hamlet of Little Braunston. Also close to the village are the three lost settlements of Braunston Cleves or Fawcliff, Braunstonbury and Wolfhampcote.

== Twin village ==
The village is twinned with Quincy-Voisins in France.
