= Braunstonbury =

- Lost Settlement
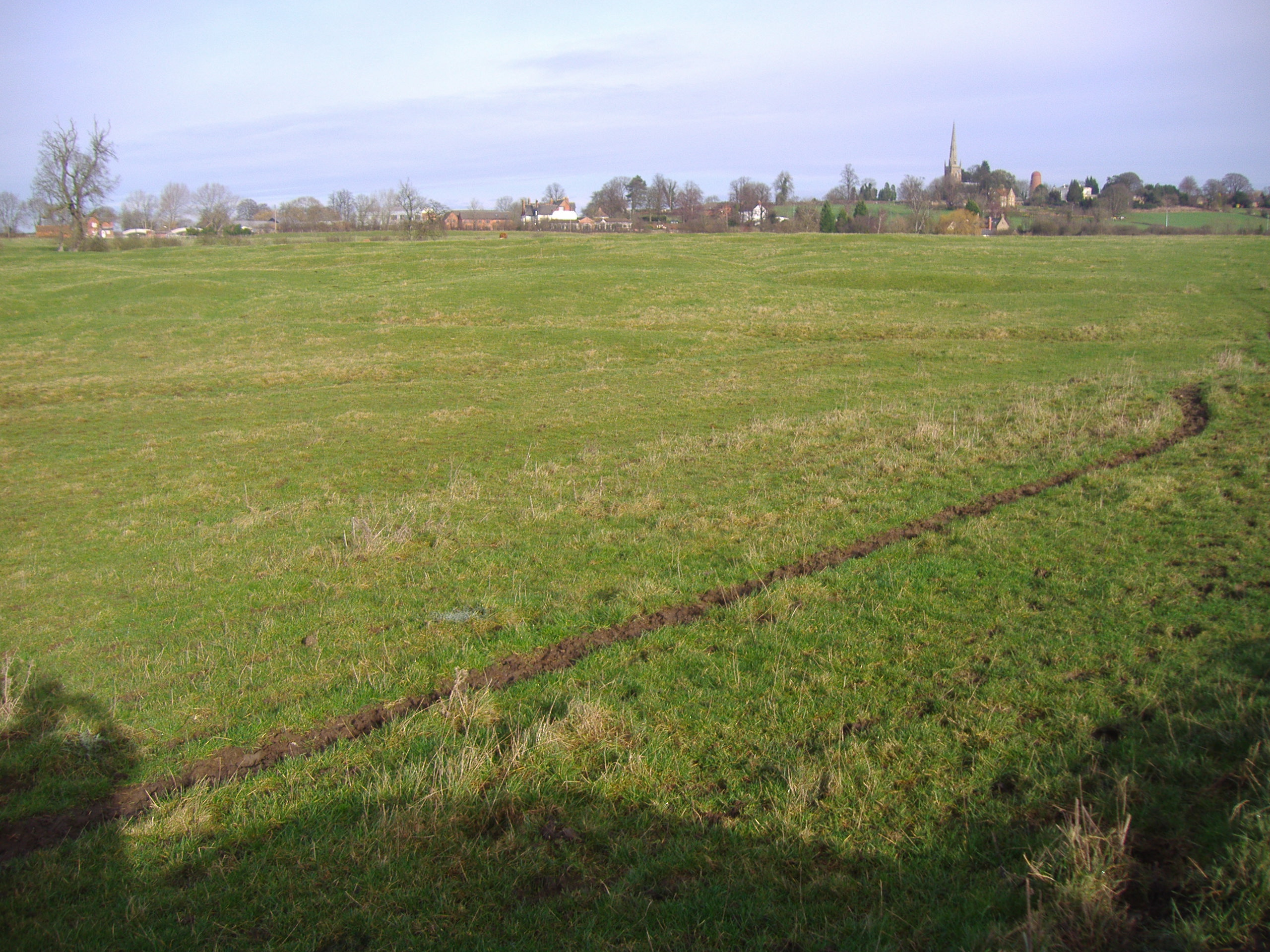
- The site of Braunstonbury

- Braunstonbury within Northamptonshire
- Coordinates: 52°16′50″N 1°13′10″W
- Country: England
- State: Northamptonshire
- Region: East Midlands
- District: Daventry
- Municipality: Braunston

The lost village of Braunstonbury lies in low ground south-west of the village of Braunston in the English county of Northamptonshire. Its site is on the eastern bank of the River Leam, which also marks the border between Northamptonshire and Warwickshire. Adjacent to the site on the west side of the river Leam is the site of the lost village of Wolfhampcote which straddled the county border of both counties.

== History ==
Very little information is known about Braunstonbury, probably because it was regarded as part of the nearby village of Braunston. It has never been listed separately in taxation records. It is thought that the settlement was part of the 11th-century manor which belonged to William Trusbott. The settlement passed to his daughter, Hilary de Bulliers, who in turn left the village to the Abbey of Lilleshall in the county of Shropshire. At the time of the dissolution of the monasteries the settlement and land was sold to the Earl of Rutland, who already owned property in the vicinity. An estate map of 1785 shows the area lacking any buildings although the undoubted medieval boundaries of Braunstonbury are shown.

== Remains Today ==
The remains of the village lie within an almost square area of land bounded to the north by a low valley which was once occupied by fishponds. On the western boundary are the remains of a bank approximately 1.5 to 2 metres high. On the southern boundary is a low bank which runs into the remains of a (now disused) railway line that was built across part of the southern boundary. There are also the remains of a low bank on the eastern boundary of the village. Cutting across the north-west corner of the site is a hollowed way which was once the lane that connected the village to nearby Braunston. In the north-west corner there is a very defined rectangular ditch around a raised platform where once stood a medieval manor house. The rest of the village can be made out by extensive earthworks and some traces of stonework can be found. A large quantity of medieval pottery dating from the 14th and 15th centuries has been found along the edge of a stream that runs along the northern boundary of the settlement. The stream once fed the fishponds that filled the low valley here.

== In the Vicinity ==
The area around the lost settlement is rich in industrial archaeology. The remains of the original route of the Oxford Canal, which was abandoned in the 1830s, can be traced through the area. There are also the remains of two abandoned railway lines, the first being the old Weedon to Leamington Spa railway, which closed in 1963, and the second being the Great Central Railway, which closed in 1966. The former passes over the southern boundaries of the village and quite close to Wolfhampcote church.
