= Napton and Stockton railway station =

Former railway station in England

Coordinates: 52.2775°N 1.3453°W

Napton and Stockton
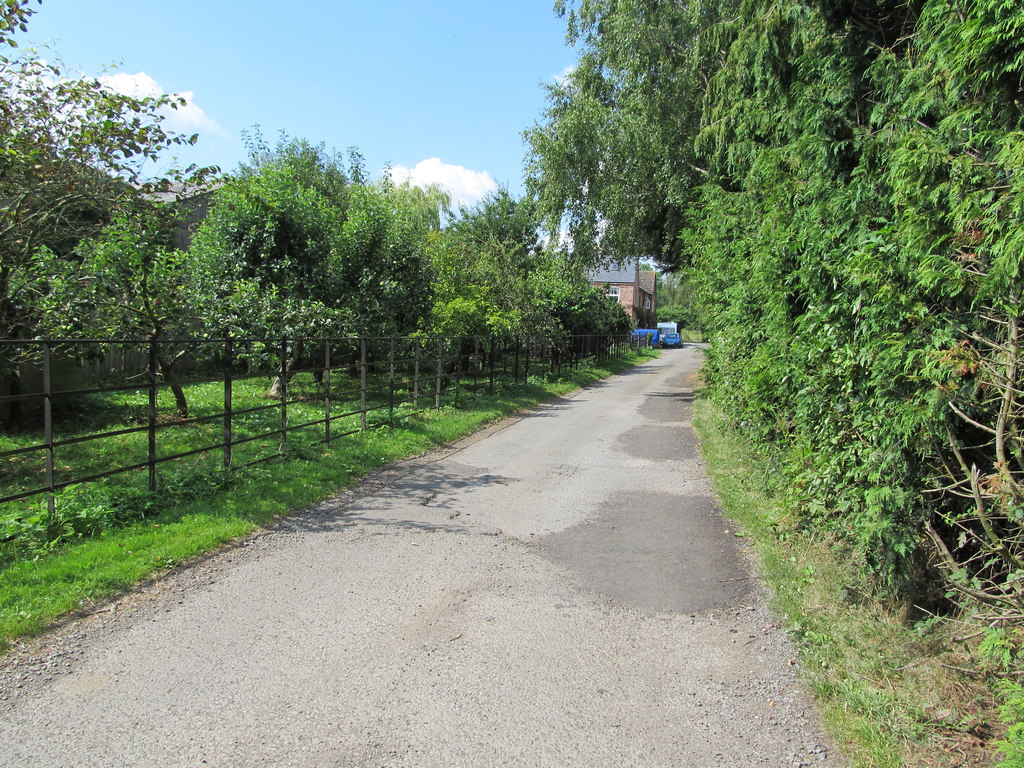
- The site of the station in 2014

General information
- Location: Stockton, Stratford-on-Avon; England
- Platforms: 2

Other information
- Status: Disused

History
- Original company: London and North Western Railway
- Pre-grouping: London, Midland and Scottish Railway

Key dates
- 1 August 1895: Station opens
- 15 September 1958: Station closes to passengers
- 2 December 1963: Station closes to freight
Location

Napton and Stockton railway station was a railway station on the London and North Western Railway branch line between Weedon and Leamington Spa.

The station was built of wood and opened on 1 August 1895. It had two platforms, one having the main station facilities and the other being on a passing loop.

The station was about 0.75 miles (1.21 km) north of Stockton and 1 mile (1.6 km) south of Broadwell. Napton was at least 2.5 miles (4.0 km) away.

British Railways withdrew passenger traffic on 15 September 1958 and freight services on 2 December 1963.

No trace of the station now remains, as the cutting where it was located has been filled in. Although some former railway workers cottages are nearby.

Preceding station	Disused railways	Following station
Flecknoe; Line and station closed	London and North Western Railway; Weedon to Leamington Spa line	Southam and Long Itchington; Line and station closed
