= Rains Brook =

River in Northamptonshire and Warwickshire, England

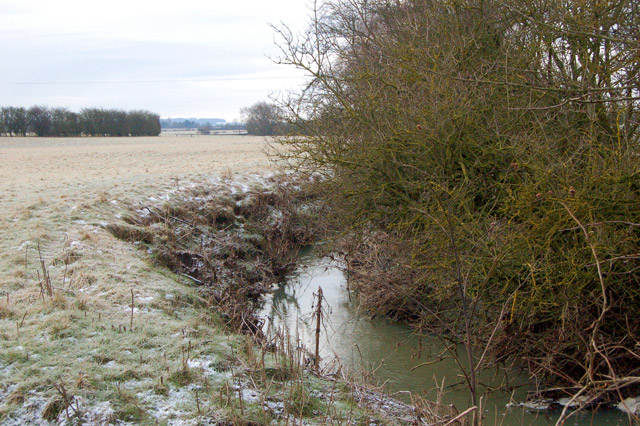
- Rains Brook near Wolscott Bridge, Dunchurch

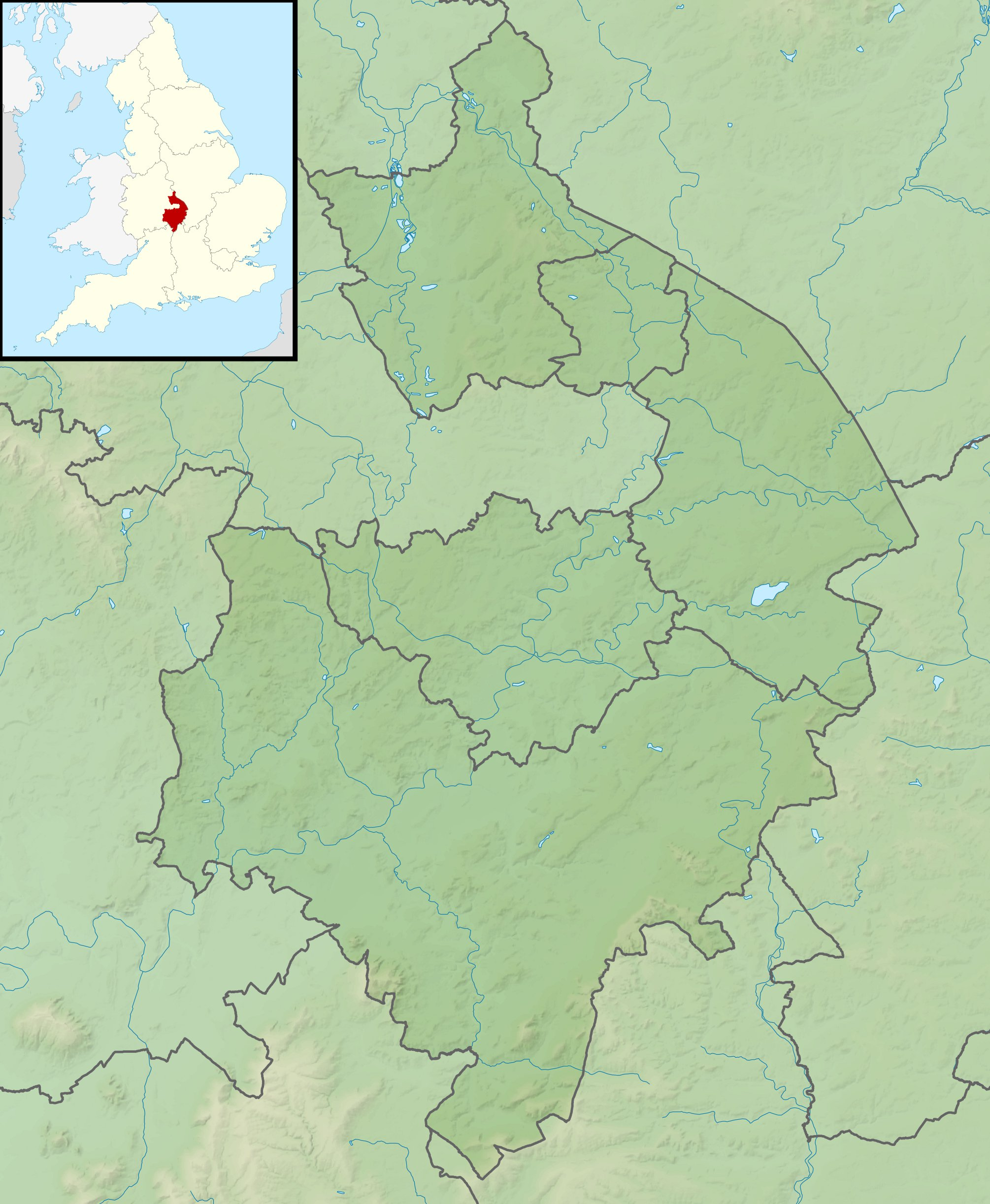
- Location of the mouth within Warwickshire

Location
- Country: England
- Counties: Northamptonshire, Warwickshire

Physical characteristics
- Source
  - location: Kilsby
- Mouth
  - location: Leam
  - coordinates: 52.313540°N 1.285856°W
- Length: 11.8 km (7.3 mi)

Rains Brook is a 11.8-kilometre-long (7.3 mi) tributary of the River Leam.

Formed by a series of small headwater streams midway between Barby and Kilsby in Northamptonshire, it then flows west in a valley south of Rugby on the border between Northamptonshire and Warwickshire. It then runs south-west to where it joins the River Leam, between Kites Hardwick and Woolscott.

== See also ==
- List of rivers of England
