= Long Itchington =

Village in Warwickshire, England

Coordinates: 52.283845°N 1.392612°W

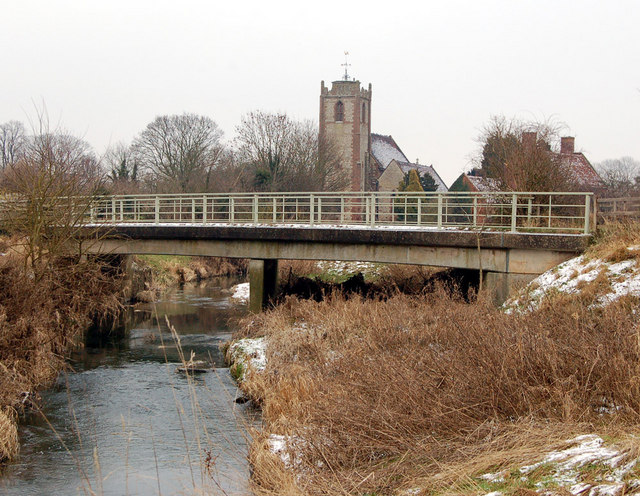
- River Itchen bridge, Long Itchington

- Location within Warwickshire
- Population: 2,704 (2021 Census)
- OS grid reference: SP420653
- Civil parish: Long Itchington
- District: Stratford-on-Avon
- Shire county: Warwickshire
- Region: West Midlands
- Country: England
- Sovereign state: United Kingdom
- Post town: SOUTHAM
- Postcode district: CV47
- Dialling code: 01926
- Police: Warwickshire
- Fire: Warwickshire
- Ambulance: West Midlands
- UK Parliament: Kenilworth and Southam

Long Itchington is a large village and civil parish in Warwickshire, England, which at the 2021 Census had a population of 2,704, including the hamlet of Bascote. The village is named after the River Itchen which flows to the south and west of the village. Long Itchington is around two miles north of Southam on the A423 road, just north of the Grand Union Canal.

The focal point at the centre of the village is a village green with a pond. Long Itchington is mostly made up of 20th century developments, but includes several historic buildings, including a half-timbered Tudor house on the main road at which Queen Elizabeth I is said to have stayed in 1572 and 1575. The old Manor House in the square dates from the 15th century.

The village church of Holy Trinity originates from the 1100s, with later additions. It is a grade II* listed building. St Wulfstan is said to have been born in Long Itchington in around 1012. He became Bishop of Worcester in 1062.

The village has long had an involvement in the cement industry. Just south of the village was a cement works and quarry. The cement works is now closed, but quarrying at the site still continues. Opposite the old cement works a little way from the main village is a small model village, which was originally built to house the cement workers.

In October 2018, a war memorial was erected to commemorate the 54 men of the village who were killed in the First World War.

== Transport ==
The village was once served by the former Weedon to Leamington Spa railway line. The village station, Southam and Long Itchington railway station was to the south of the village on the road towards Southam, and closed to passengers in 1958, although the line to the cement works continued in operation for goods trains until 1985. Part of the old railway line has been converted into a cycleway as part of the National Cycle Network.

Buses are run by Stagecoach Midlands with services to Leamington Spa, Southam or Rugby.

== Amenities ==
The village contains seven pubs, a diner, a small shop, a Co-op small supermarket, a church, a Congregational chapel, a nursery, a primary school, a hairdressers, a park with skate ramp and a community centre.

== Gallery ==
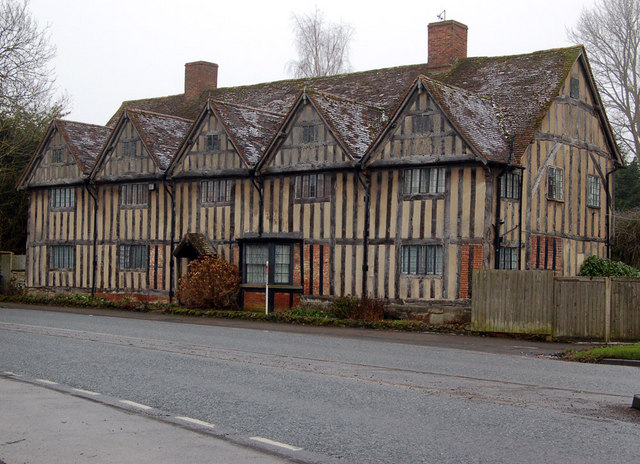
Tudor house in Long Itchington where Queen Elizabeth I is believed to have stayed

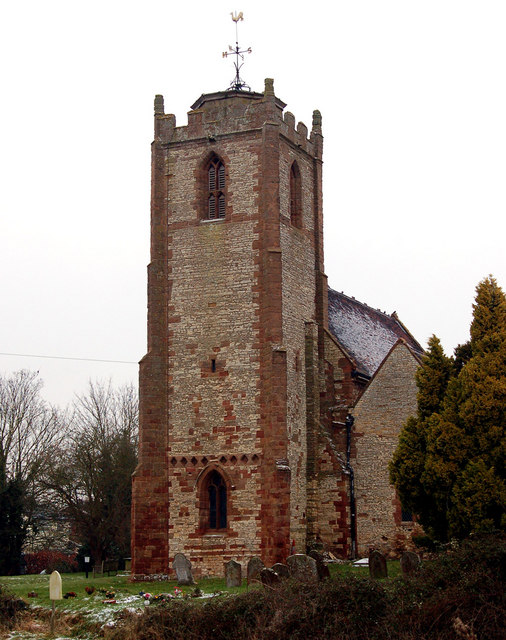
Holy Trinity Church

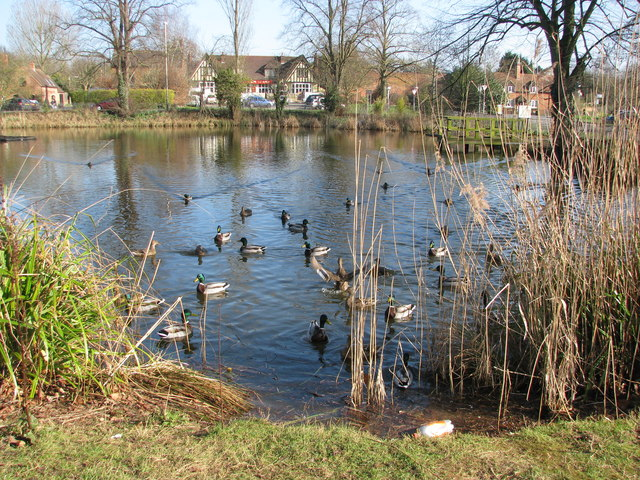
Duck pond on the village green
