= Sawbridge =

Hamlet in Warwickshire, England

Coordinates: 52.28714°N 1.26401°W

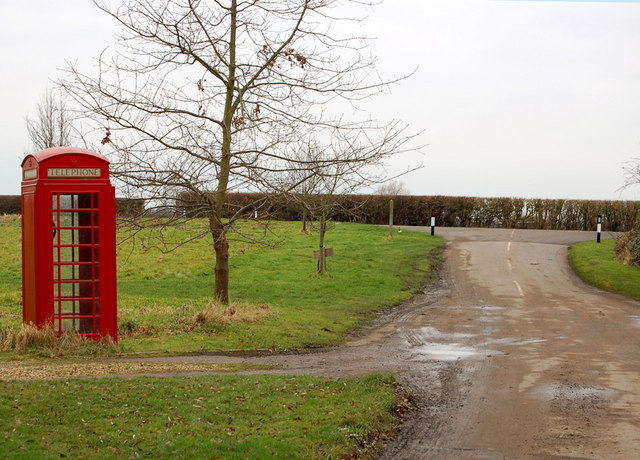
Sawbridge phonebox

Sawbridge is a small hamlet in Warwickshire, England. It is 4 km north-west of Daventry and 8 km south of Rugby. It is within the civil parish of Wolfhampcote, under which population details can be found. The Grand Union Canal and River Leam run nearby as did the now-defunct Great Central main line railway track. Sawbridge does not have two of the most common features of the English village, a public house or a church. It does, however, have a telephone box. In 1689, a Celtic ritual shaft-well was discovered in the village, measuring 4 feet square. At a depth of 20 feet was a large stone with a hole in the middle, used to mount a post. 24 grey ware urns stood on this stone platform, of which 12 were recovered whole and 12 had been broken. The shaft narrowed and continued in depth beyond 40 feet

In the twelfth century Sawbridge was held by Thorney Abbey; a writ of Henry I survives ordering the tenant to restore the manor of Sawbridge to the Abbot of Thorney, "and do not let me hear any complaint about injustice".
