= Wolfhampcote =

Civil parish in Warwickshire, England

Coordinates: 52.284744°N 1.2258697°W

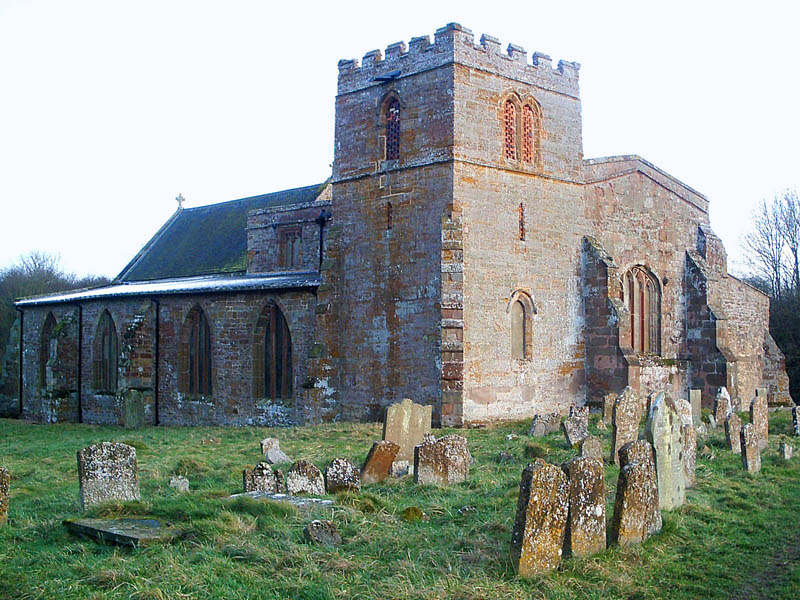
- The Church of St Peter in Wolfhampcote

- Location within Warwickshire
- Population: 292 (Parish 2021 Census)
- OS grid reference: SP525655
- District: Rugby
- Shire county: Warwickshire; Northamptonshire
- Region: West Midlands
- Country: England
- Sovereign state: United Kingdom
- Post town: Rugby
- Postcode district: CV23
- Police: Warwickshire
- Fire: Warwickshire
- Ambulance: West Midlands

Wolfhampcote is an abandoned village and civil parish in the English counties of Warwickshire and Northamptonshire, which it straddles. The civil parish is only in Warwickshire, with the entire eastern boundary with Northamptonshire clearly formed by the River Leam. This river also forms the boundary with Willoughby civil parish to the north.

== Civil parish ==
The civil parish of Wolfhampcote in Rugby borough, includes the old village, plus the nearby village of Flecknoe, and the small hamlets of Sawbridge and Nethercote. In 2001, the parish had a population of 263, increasing to 284 in the 2011 Census, and again to 292 at the 2021 census. Flecknoe is the largest settlement in the parish.

== Medieval village ==
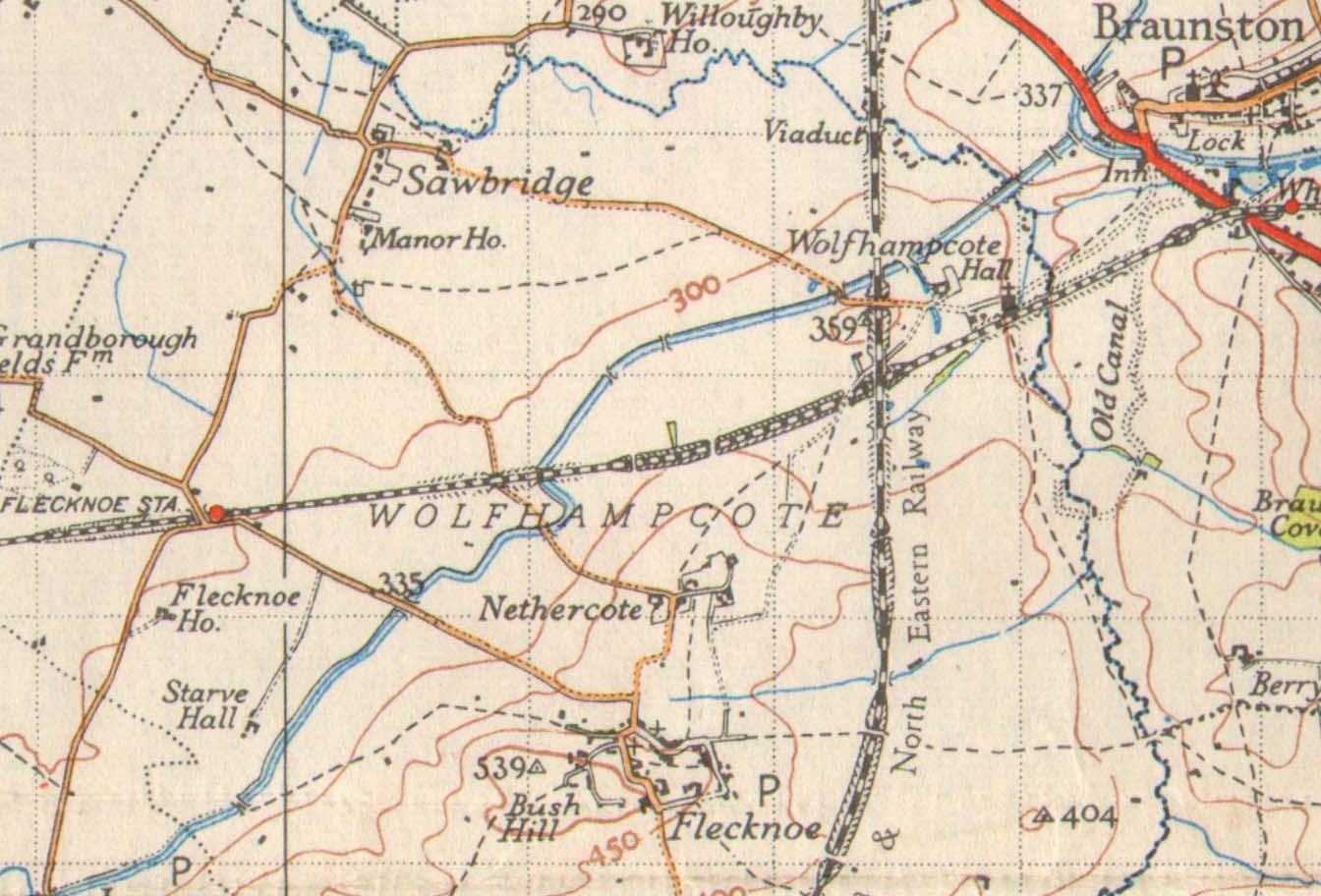
1946 map of Wolfhampcote parish, the old village is near Braunston, the map shows the former railway lines which criss-crossed the area, both now closed

The old village of Wolfhampcote is west of the A45 road near Braunston in Northamptonshire, and can be reached by a track from the main A45 road, or by a lane from Flecknoe. The village was mentioned as Ufelmscote in the Domesday Book of 1086, and was abandoned sometime in the late 14th century and is classified as a deserted medieval village. Local legend suggests that the village was wiped out by the Black Death brought in by refugees from London, but there is no evidence to support this. It is much more likely that a few cottages still remained after the great plague and after struggling to maintain their land the villagers drifted off to more prosperous places leaving the Lord of the manor to clear the land for sheep grazing as best he could. The village is shown as Wulfencote on the Christopher Saxton map of 1637.

The only remains of the village are a cottage, a farmhouse, and the old vicarage, located some distance away. The most notable surviving feature of the village is the Church of St Peter, which stands isolated apparently in the middle of nowhere in a field. The church has been restored on several occasions, most recently in the 1970s by an organisation called the Friends of Friendless Churches. The church is today managed by the Churches Conservation Trust and is used only once or twice a year.

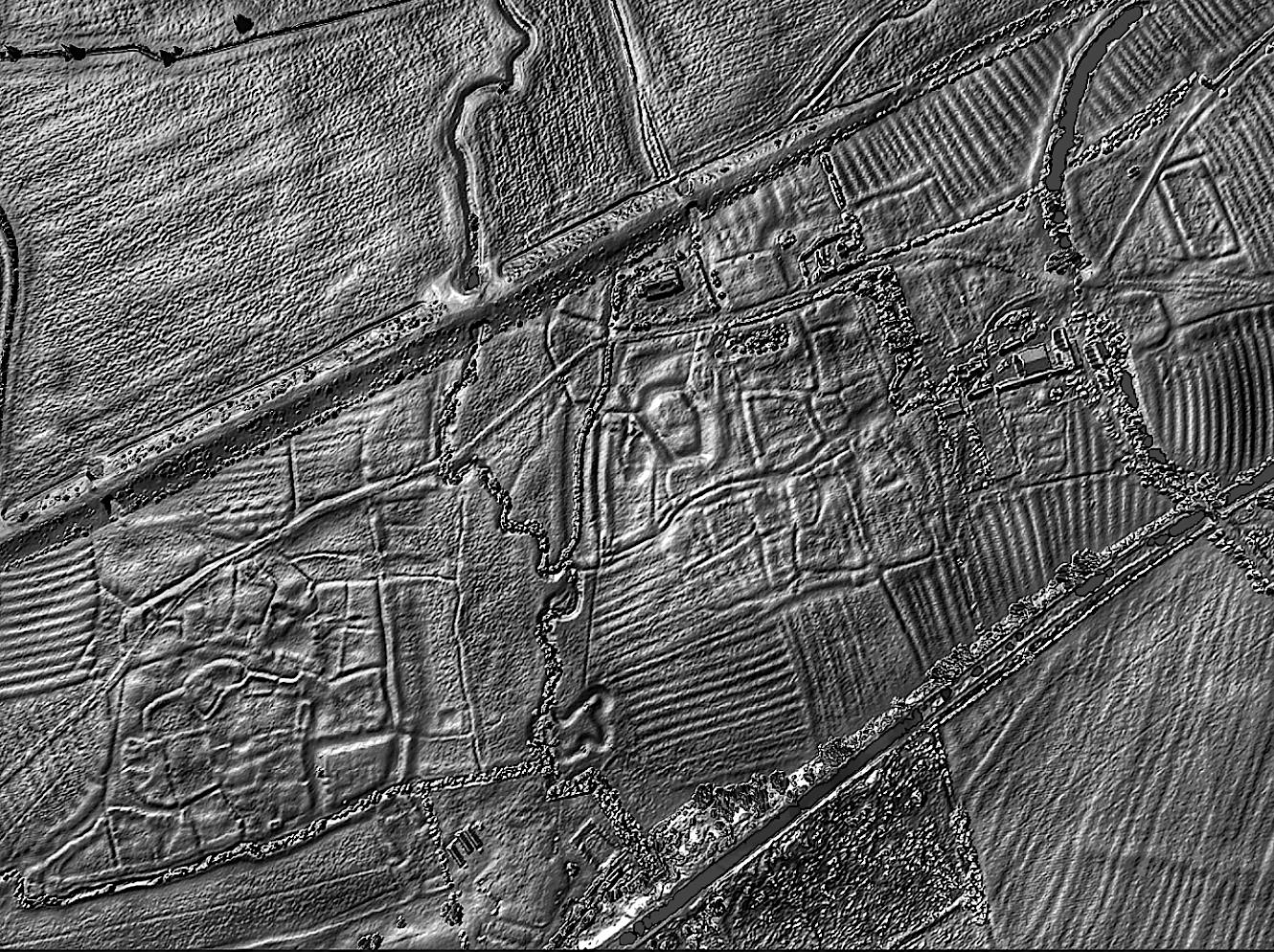
A lidar view of the site of Wolfhampcote and Braunstonbury.

The area around the old village is rich in industrial archaeology. The Oxford Canal passes to the north of the site, but this section is the result of a straightening-out dating from the 1830s, the more southerly original route (constructed in the 1770s) having followed a much more winding course, remains of which can still be traced through the area. There are also the remains of two abandoned railway lines, the first being the old Weedon to Leamington Spa (via Daventry) railway, part of the London and North Western Railway (later the LMS), which closed to passengers in September 1958 and to freight in December 1963, and the second being the Great Central Main Line, which closed to all traffic in September 1966. The former passes quite close to the south side of the church. The two lines crossed a short distance to the west.

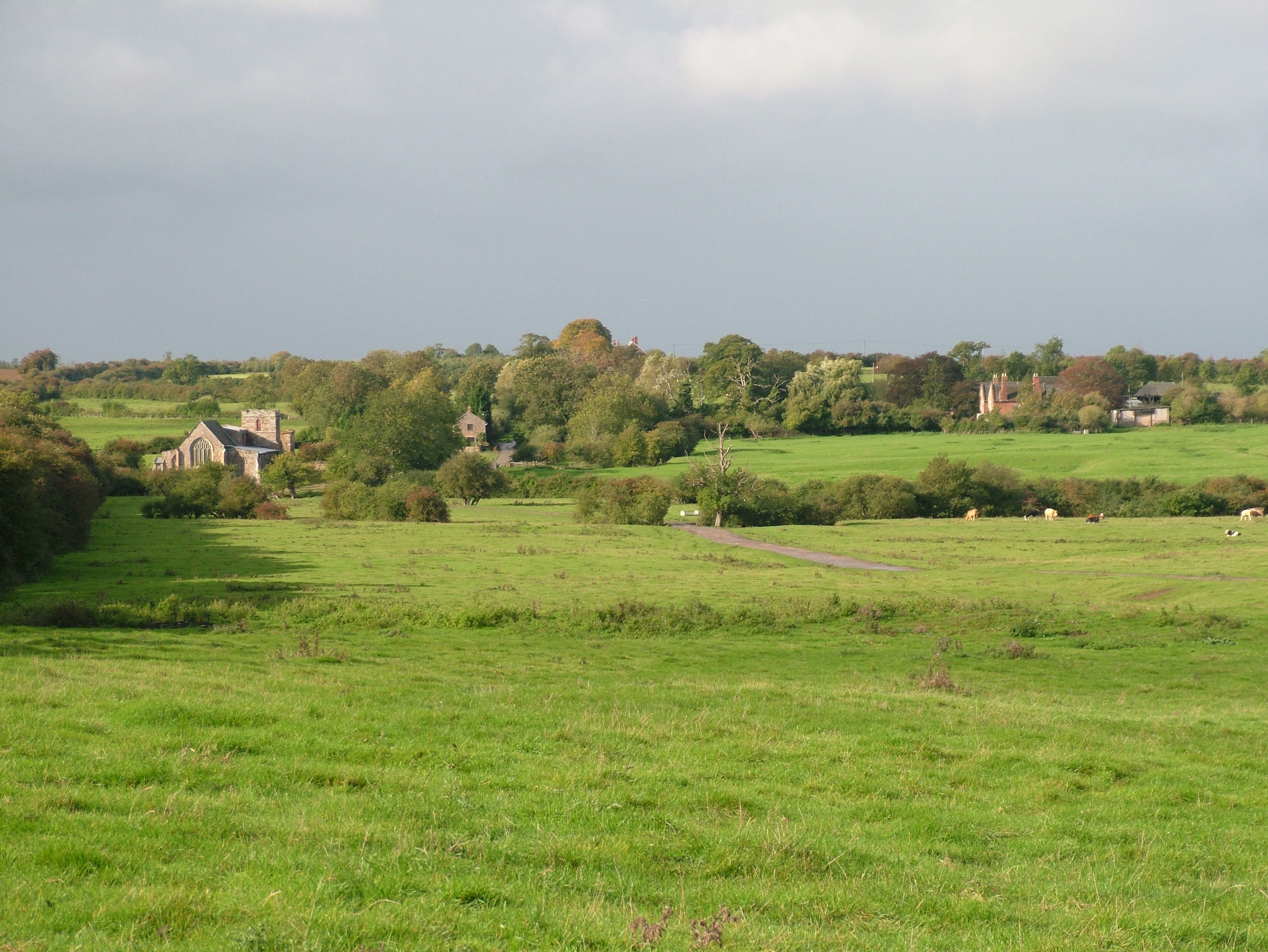
The ancient hamlet of Wolfhampcote
