= Grandborough =

Village in Warwickshire, England

Coordinates: 52.298983°N 1.27917°W

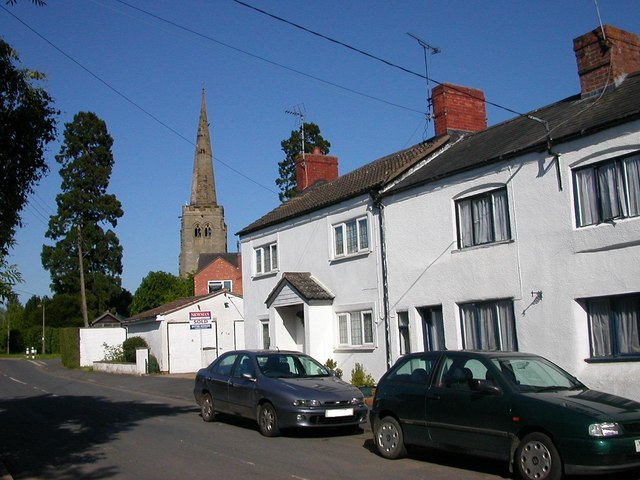
- Main Street, Grandborough

- Location within Warwickshire
- Population: 492 (2021 census)
- OS grid reference: SP491670
- Civil parish: Grandborough
- District: Rugby
- Shire county: Warwickshire
- Region: West Midlands
- Country: England
- Sovereign state: United Kingdom
- Post town: RUGBY
- Postcode district: CV23
- Dialling code: 01788
- Police: Warwickshire
- Fire: Warwickshire
- Ambulance: West Midlands
- UK Parliament: Kenilworth and Southam

Grandborough is a small village and civil parish in the Rugby district, in the county of Warwickshire, England. The parish includes the hamlets of Calcutt, Grandborough Fields and Woolscott. The population of the civil parish at the 2021 census was 492. Grandborough is in a rural area of eastern Warwickshire, around six miles (10 km) south of Rugby and six miles northwest of Daventry, Northamptonshire. Grandborough is about two miles from the nearest main roads and can be reached by country lanes from the A45 to the east, and the A426 to the west.

The River Leam flows north of the village. There was a watermill (now a private residence) where the river passed under the road from Woolscott. In times of flood, the river flows over the road creating a ford. A road sign suggests that pedestrians and motorists should "Use causeway if flooded".

Grandborough's church is dedicated to St Peter. The church spire, and the two tall Wellingtonia trees which flank it, are notable local landmarks. There is also a Primitive Methodist chapel (erected in 1856, extended in 1991, but closed in November 2021), a village hall (the Benn Memorial Hall, erected in 1897) and a number of old (mostly Victorian) cottages. The village has a pub called the Shoulder of Mutton. In Main Street there is a private house which was formerly a pub called the Royal George. Harrow House, in Woolscott, was formerly a pub called the Old Harrow Inn.

== History ==
Grandborough was mentioned in the Domesday Book as Graensburgh. Until the early 20th century the name was spelt as Granborough. Its name was supposed by Eilert Ekwall to come from Anglo-Saxon Grēnbeorg = "green rounded hill", but the Domesday Book form points otherwise. It appears as Granborowe on the Christopher Saxton map of 1637.

The former village school still stands. It closed in April 1974 and is now a private house. A stone plaque hidden on an east-facing wall has the inscription "Train up a child in the way he should go, and when he is old he will not depart from it" and the date 1840. The quotation is taken from the Book of Proverbs, chapter 22, verse 6.

The first mention of a post office in the village is the issue in April 1847 of a type of postmark known as an undated circle (with the spelling Granborough). The post office and village shop closed on 4 April 1997.

== Notable residents ==
Mark Pawsey, former MP for Rugby.
