= Southam and Long Itchington railway station =

Former railway station in England

Coordinates: 52.2744°N 1.3905°W

Southam and Long Itchington

General information
- Location: Southam and Long Itchington, Stratford-on-Avon; England
- Platforms: 2

Other information
- Status: Disused

History
- Original company: London and North Western Railway
- Pre-grouping: London and North Western Railway

Key dates
- 1 August 1895: Station opens
- 15 September 1958: Station closes to passengers
- 5 July 1965: Station closes to freight
Location

Southam and Long Itchington railway station was a railway station on the Weedon to Leamington Spa branch line that served the town of Southam and the village of Long Itchington in Warwickshire, England. The station was just south of Long Itchington, and about 1.5 miles (2.4 km) to the north of Southam.

The brick built station was opened on 1 August 1895 along with the other stations on the Daventry to Marton Junction extension of the Daventry line. The station had two platforms, one being served by a passing loop with its main station facilities being located on the other. The last passenger train ran on 15 September 1958. However, the line continued to carry freight, mainly cement, until 1 August 1985.

| Preceding station | Disused railways | Following station |
|---|---|---|
| Napton and Stockton; Line and station closed | London and North Western Railway; Weedon to Leamington Spa line | Leamington Spa (Avenue); Line and station closed |

== See also ==
- Southam Road and Harbury railway station
