= Flecknoe =

Village in Warwickshire, England

Coordinates: 52.266756°N 1.246452°W

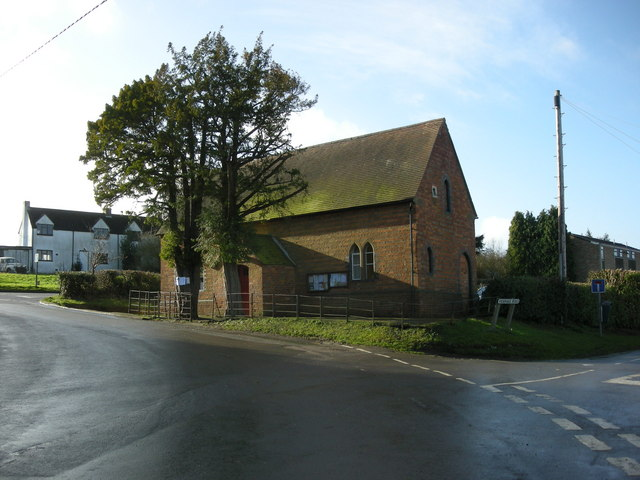
- Flecknoe village hall

- Location within Warwickshire
- Population: 212 (2001)
- OS grid reference: SP515635
- Civil parish: Wolfhampcote
- District: Rugby
- Shire county: Warwickshire
- Region: West Midlands
- Country: England
- Sovereign state: United Kingdom
- Post town: RUGBY
- Postcode district: CV23
- Dialling code: 01788
- Police: Warwickshire
- Fire: Warwickshire
- Ambulance: West Midlands
- UK Parliament: Kenilworth and Southam

Flecknoe is a village in the Rugby district of Warwickshire, England, one mile west of the border with Northamptonshire. The village is the largest settlement within the civil parish of Wolfhampcote, and has a population of around 200. The village was mentioned in the Domesday Book as Flachenho, probably meaning "Flecca's hill". The village is shown as Fleckno on the Christopher Saxton map of 1637.

Flecknoe is quite an isolated village, it is located on a hill called Bush Hill, one mile north of the nearest main road (the A425 road Southam - Daventry road) and is connected only by narrow lanes. Flecknoe has a small church, dedicated to St. Mark, which was built in 1891. An older chapel in the village dating from 1837 is now a private house. The village formerly had a school, which is now the village hall. On the outskirts of the village is a derelict brick building which is attributed to be the remains of a Second World War camp. The village also has an Edwardian pub called the Old Olive Bush.

The Grand Union Canal runs in the plain to the north of the village, which also contains the remains of the former Weedon to Leamington railway line. Flecknoe once had a railway station on this line. The station was over a mile north of the village and effectively in the middle of nowhere, consequently it was an early victim of British Railways' closure programme, the last passenger train running on 3 November 1952. However, the line survived carrying freight until 2 December 1963. To the east of the village are the remains of the former Great Central Main Line. Around half a mile to the north of Flecknoe is the tiny hamlet of Nethercote.
