= Napton on the Hill =

Village in Warwickshire, England

Coordinates: 52.245°N 1.326°W

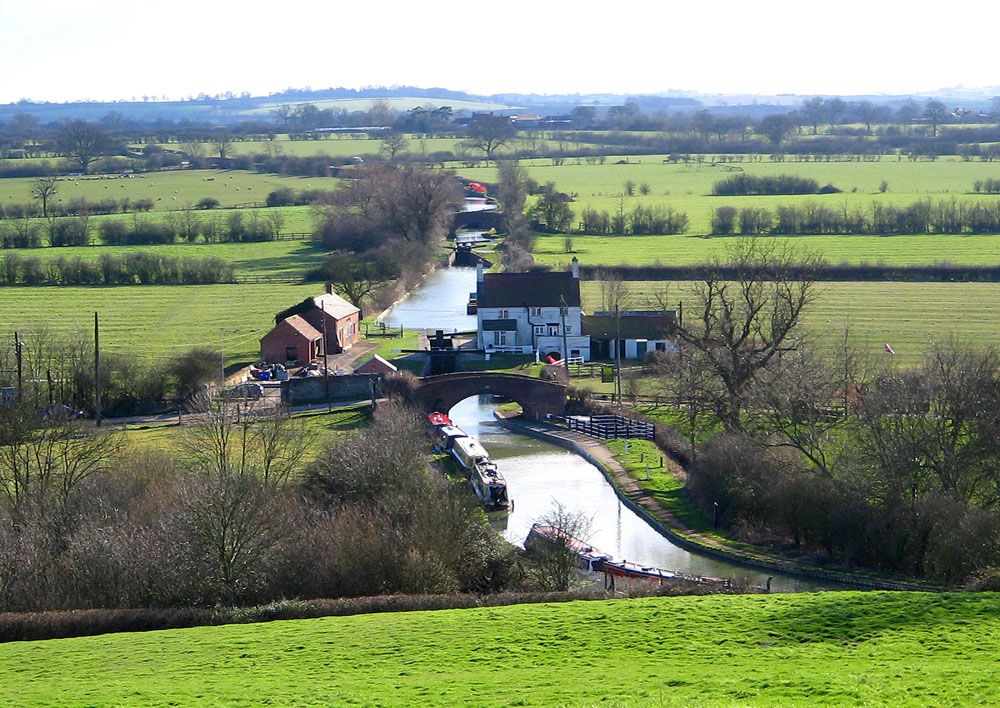
- The Oxford Canal viewed from Napton

- Location within Warwickshire
- Population: 1,416 (2021 Census)
- OS grid reference: SP4661
- Civil parish: Napton on the Hill
- District: Stratford-on-Avon
- Shire county: Warwickshire
- Region: West Midlands
- Country: England
- Sovereign state: United Kingdom
- Post town: SOUTHAM
- Postcode district: CV47
- Dialling code: 01926
- Police: Warwickshire
- Fire: Warwickshire
- Ambulance: West Midlands
- UK Parliament: Kenilworth and Southam
- Website: Napton on the Hill

Napton on the Hill is a village and civil parish in the Stratford-on-Avon District of Warwickshire, England. The population of the civil parish taken at the 2021 census was 1,416.

== Manor ==
The toponym Napton is derived from the Old English cnæpp meaning 'hilltop' and tūn meaning 'settlement' in the Old English language. In 1086 the Domesday Book recorded the village as Neptone. The hill on which the village is built is just over 500 feet (150 m) above sea level, commanding the remainder of the parish which for the most part is at a height of about 300 feet (91 m). The Domesday Book records that in 1086 Robert de Beaumont, Count of Meulan held the principal manor of Napton. In 1107 Henry I made de Beaumont Earl of Leicester and de Beaumont's manor at Napton became part of the honour of Leicester Castle. When Robert de Beaumont, 4th Earl of Leicester died in 1204 leaving no male heir his estates were divided between his two sisters.

Napton was included in the half that passed to his younger sister Margaret, and thereby to her husband Saer de Quincy who in 1207 was made Earl of Winchester. Napton was still part of the honour of Winchester Castle in 1271 but Roger de Quincy, 2nd Earl of Winchester had died in 1265 with no male heir, leaving his estates to his three daughters. In 1285 the husbands of two of these, Alexander Comyn, Earl of Buchan and William de Ferrers, 5th Earl of Derby, jointly claimed view of frankpledge over Napton. There are further references to Napton's feudal overlordship in the 14th century and in 1413.

== Parish church ==
The oldest parts of the Church of England parish church of St Lawrence include the chancel, which was built in the 12th century and still has three Norman windows in its north wall. The south doorway of the nave is also from the end of the 12th century. Prof. Louis Salzman considered that the north and south transepts were also 12th century but Prof. Nikolaus Pevsner and Alexandra Wedgwood proposed a later date of about 1275, noting their triplets of Early English Gothic lancet windows. The north and south aisles were added in the 13th century after the transepts. The lower stages of the bell tower date from about 1300. The east window of the south transept is a later Perpendicular Gothic addition.

The south porch reuses a mixture of Early English and Perpendicular masonry and has puzzled historians. Louis Francis Salzman thought it could have been built either at the end of the 16th century or in the 17th century but Nikolaus Pevsner and Alexandra Wedgwood suspected the involvement of J. Croft, the architect who restored the church in 1861. The vestry may also have been added in the 17th century and the upper stage of the tower was rebuilt early in the 18th century. After this rebuilding a ring of five bells was cast in 1731 and hung in the tower.

The tenor was recast in 1874 and John Taylor & Co rehung all the bells in 1958. The ring was increased to six bells by the addition of the treble cast by Whitechapel Bell Foundry in 1963. St. Lawrence's is at the top of the hill, making it a local landmark and giving it commanding views over the surrounding countryside, especially from the top of the tower. St. Lawrence's parish is now part of a single Church of England benefice with the parishes of Lower Shuckburgh and Stockton, part of the Bridges Group of parishes. Actor Ed Bishop is buried in the churchyard.

== Economic and social history ==
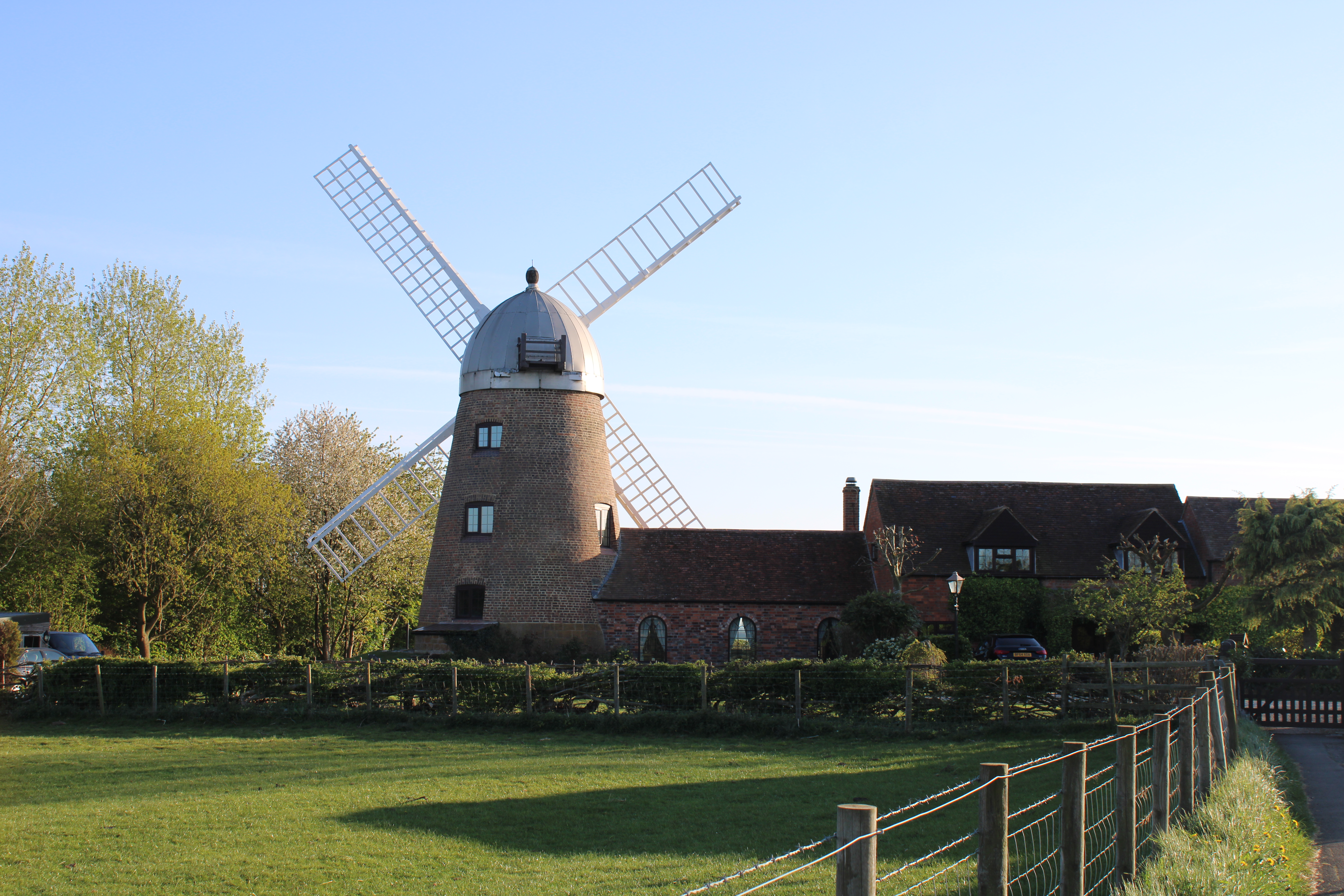
Napton Windmill in 2022

In the 14th century Napton was granted a market charter by King Edward II and throughout the Middle Ages it was one of the largest settlements in Warwickshire. However the market died out, and the population of the village today of around 1,000, is roughly the same as it was in the year 1400. Napton had a windmill by 1543. The present stone-built tower mill is a later structure, dating from the 18th or early 19th century that was derelict in 1966 but has since been restored. It is a Grade II listed building.

Napton had separate schools for girls and boys until 1948 when they were merged to form the current St. Lawrence Church of England Primary School, which moved to its current premises in 1997.

== Canals ==
The first section of the Oxford Canal from Hawkesbury Junction was completed in 1771 and it reached Napton in 1774. This made Napton the head of navigation for coal supplies to be forwarded by road to Banbury, Bicester, Woodstock and Oxford until 1777, when the canal reached Fenny Compton which then took over as the trans-shipment point. The Oxford Canal's chief engineer, Samuel Simcock, designed the canal to be a contour canal as much as possible, so he routed it around three sides of Napton Hill to minimise the number of locks needed. Even so, to climb from Napton Wharf to the summit pound at Marston Doles required eight locks around the hill (nos. 8–15) and another at Marston Doles (no. 16), that between them raise boats by a total of 52 feet (16 m).

The 11 miles (18 km) long summit pound between Marston Doles and Claydon suffered from a shortage of water so Parliament passed an Act in 1786 authorising the company to use any water supply within 1,000 yards (910 m) of the canal. Just over 1 mile (1.6 km) south of Napton it sank a well that fed the summit pound via a 900 yards (820 m) feeder arm westwards to the canal between locks 11 and 12 and then a 1 mile (1.6 km) channel beside the canal from there to just above Marston Doles lock. An engine house with a steam engine and pump were built at the well-head (grid reference SP 4655 5910) and the well seems to have begun operation in 1793. The boiler needed replacement as early as 1794 and an accident with the engine killed a workman in 1796.

In 1800 the Warwick and Napton Canal (W&N) was completed, joining the Oxford Canal at Napton Junction. To reach the same level as the Oxford Canal the W&N ascended three locks at Calcutt just north of Napton parish. With each passage of a narrowboat through Calcutt Lock the Oxford Canal lost a certain amount of water so the W&N agreed to pay the Oxford 2 shillings (2/-) (10 new pence) for each such passage. In 1805 the Grand Junction Canal was completed, joining the Oxford Canal at Braunston 4.5 miles (7.2 km) east of Napton and completing the direct canal route between Birmingham and London. Between 1808 and 1811 the W&N built a reservoir at Ashby St Ledgers 7 miles (11 km) from Napton to feed both the Oxford and the W&N via the Grand Junction Canal. This enabled the Oxford to cease regular pumping at Napton and stop charging the W&N two shillings for each boat through Calcutt Locks.

A century later, in autumn 1911, the canals again suffered a water shortage so the Oxford Canal brought its well at Napton back into use. The old pumping engine had long been out of action so the company hired two Oxford Steam Plough Company steam ploughing engines to work the pump. In 1974 there was another water shortage and British Waterways resorted to back-pumping water up Napton Locks. In 1928 the Grand Junction Canal took over the W&N and Warwick and Birmingham Canals to form the Grand Union Canal. The Grand Union wanted to widen its route to enable it to take barges 12.5 feet (3.8 m) wide, so in 1931 an Act of Parliament gave the Grand Union special powers over the Oxford Canal to widen the section between Braunston and Napton Junctions. Between 1932 and 1947 it widened bridges between Braunston and Napton and increased the depth of the canal to 5.5 feet (1.7 m). The canals are now primarily a leisure facility and Napton Junction has a marina that offers moorings and narrowboats for hire.

== Napton Festival ==
On 16 September 2006 the first Napton Festival was held at Holt Farm on Holt Road. The headline act was the hard rock band Girlschool. The festival was repeated in the same place in 2007, with two stages and with The Sweet and the Hollies as its main acts. In 2008 the main acts were Bad Company on the main stage and Aynsley Lister in the marquee. The 2008 festival extended to the Friday night with Jilted Generation performing in the marquee. Smaller events were held in Napton village in 2009 and 2010, both headlined by Whole Lotta DC. In 2011 the festival was held in a new site on the edge of Napton village. It was a two-day event with bands including the Ripps on the Friday night and the Bluetones and the Total Stone Roses headlining the Saturday night.

== Notable people ==
The BBC's Rural Affairs Correspondent and Director of Checked Shirt TV Limited, Thomas John Gillespie "Tom" Heap, the son of the Foreign and Commonwealth Office's John Arnfield Heap, lives in the village. The American actor Ed Bishop (1932–2005) is buried in the parish churchyard, having lived in the village for several years.

== Sources ==
- Allen, Geoff (2000). Warwickshire: Towns and Villages (Towns & villages of Britain). Sigma Leisure. ISBN 1-85058-642-X.
- British Waterways Board (1965). British Waterways Inland Cruising Booklet 6, Cruising on The Oxford Canal, Napton Junction to Oxford. London: British Waterways Board.
- Compton, Hugh J (1976). The Oxford Canal. Newton Abbot: David & Charles. ISBN 0-7153-7238-6.
- Pevsner, Nikolaus; Wedgwood, Alexandra (1966). The Buildings of England: Warwickshire. Harmondsworth: Penguin Books. pp. 358–359.
- Salzman, LF, ed. (1951). A History of the County of Warwick, Volume 6: Knightlow hundred. Victoria County History. London. pp. 181–187.
