= Woolscott =

Hamlet in Warwickshire, England

Coordinates: 52.307°N 1.273°W

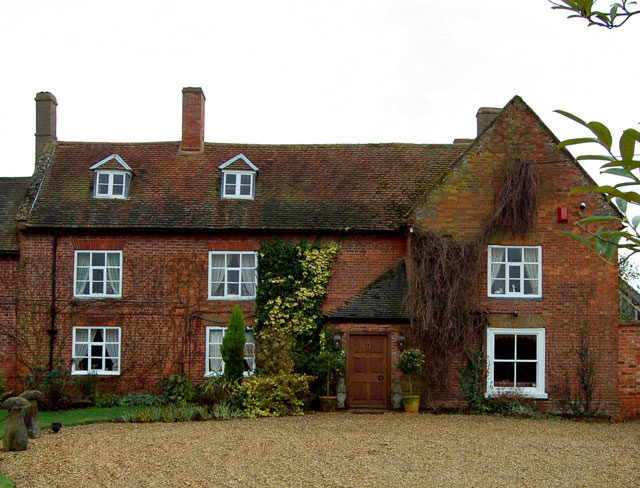
- Woolscott Manor

- Location within Warwickshire
- OS grid reference: SP4967
- Civil parish: Grandborough
- District: Rugby
- Shire county: Warwickshire
- Region: West Midlands
- Country: England
- Sovereign state: United Kingdom
- Police: Warwickshire
- Fire: Warwickshire
- Ambulance: West Midlands

Woolscott is a hamlet in the civil parish of Grandborough, in the Rugby district, in the county of Warwickshire, England. In 1870-72 it had a population of 171. The name may mean 'Wulf's cot(e),'.
