= Weedon–Marton Junction line =

Rural branch line

The Weedon–Marton Junction line (also known as the Weedon–Leamington line) was a rural branch line in England that ran from the West Coast Main Line at Weedon, via Daventry to Marton Junction, where it joined the Rugby–Leamington line and thus connected to Leamington Spa.

Opening in stages between 1888 and 1895, the line was closed to passengers in 1958, and to freight in 1963, however a short section of the line at the western end from Marton Junction to Southam, remained open for freight trains serving the cement works until 1985.

== Route and stations ==
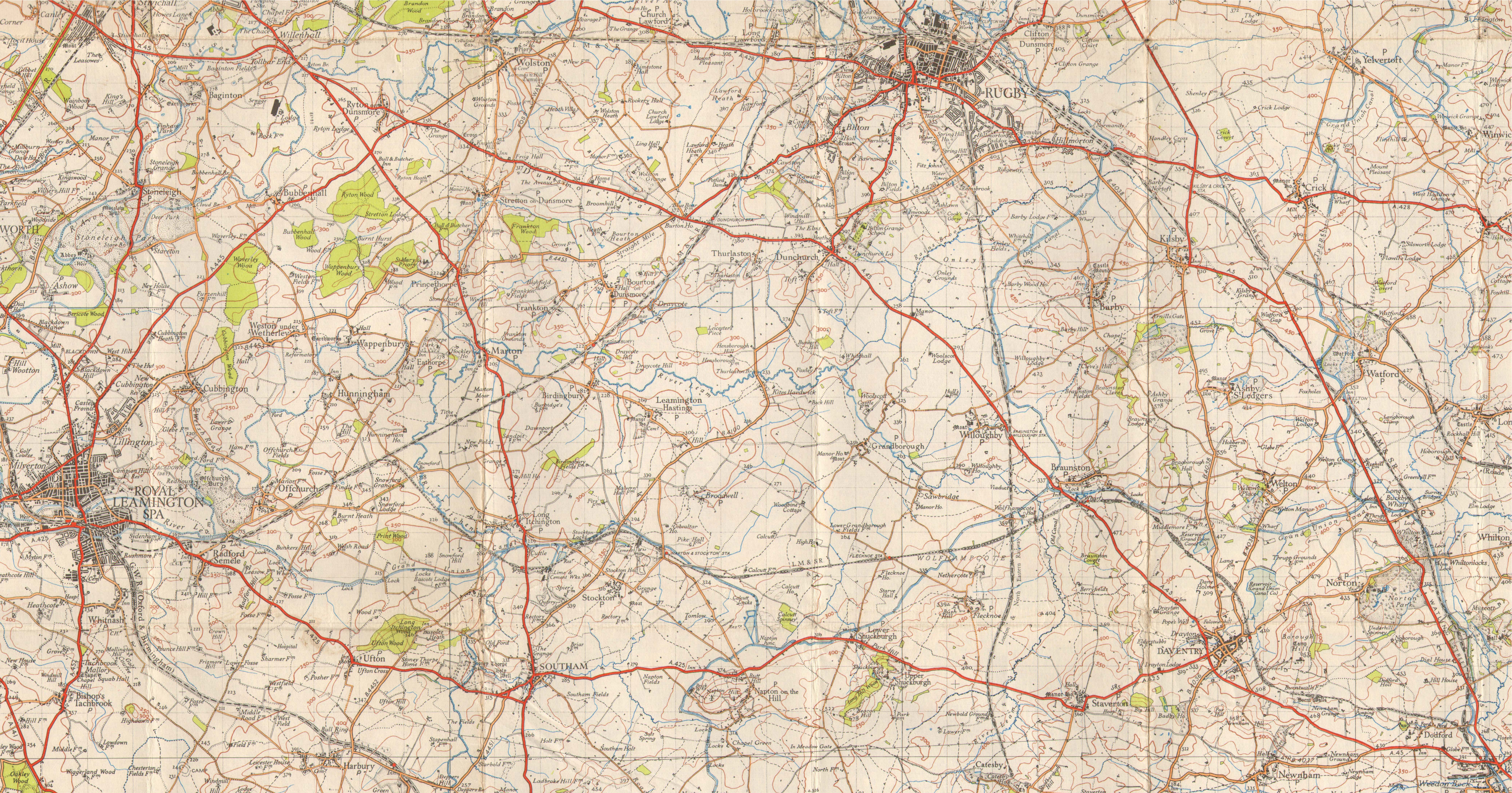
1946 Ordnance Survey map: The route of the Rugby-Leamington and Weedon-Leamington lines can be seen

There were six stations on the line:

- Weedon (which allowed interchange with the West Coast Main Line)
- Daventry
- Braunston
- Flecknoe
- Napton & Stockton
- Southam & Long Itchington

Trains to Leamington called at the now closed Leamington Spa (Avenue) station, and either terminated at the now closed Milverton station, or continued to Nuneaton.

Weedon, Daventry and Braunston stations were in Northamptonshire, while the remainder were in Warwickshire.

The line was single track throughout with passing loops at each of the stations except Flecknoe. Provision was made for a passing loop at Flecknoe, but it was never used. The later Great Central Main Line passed over the line at Wolfhampcote between Braunston and Flecknoe, but there was never any physical connection between the two lines.

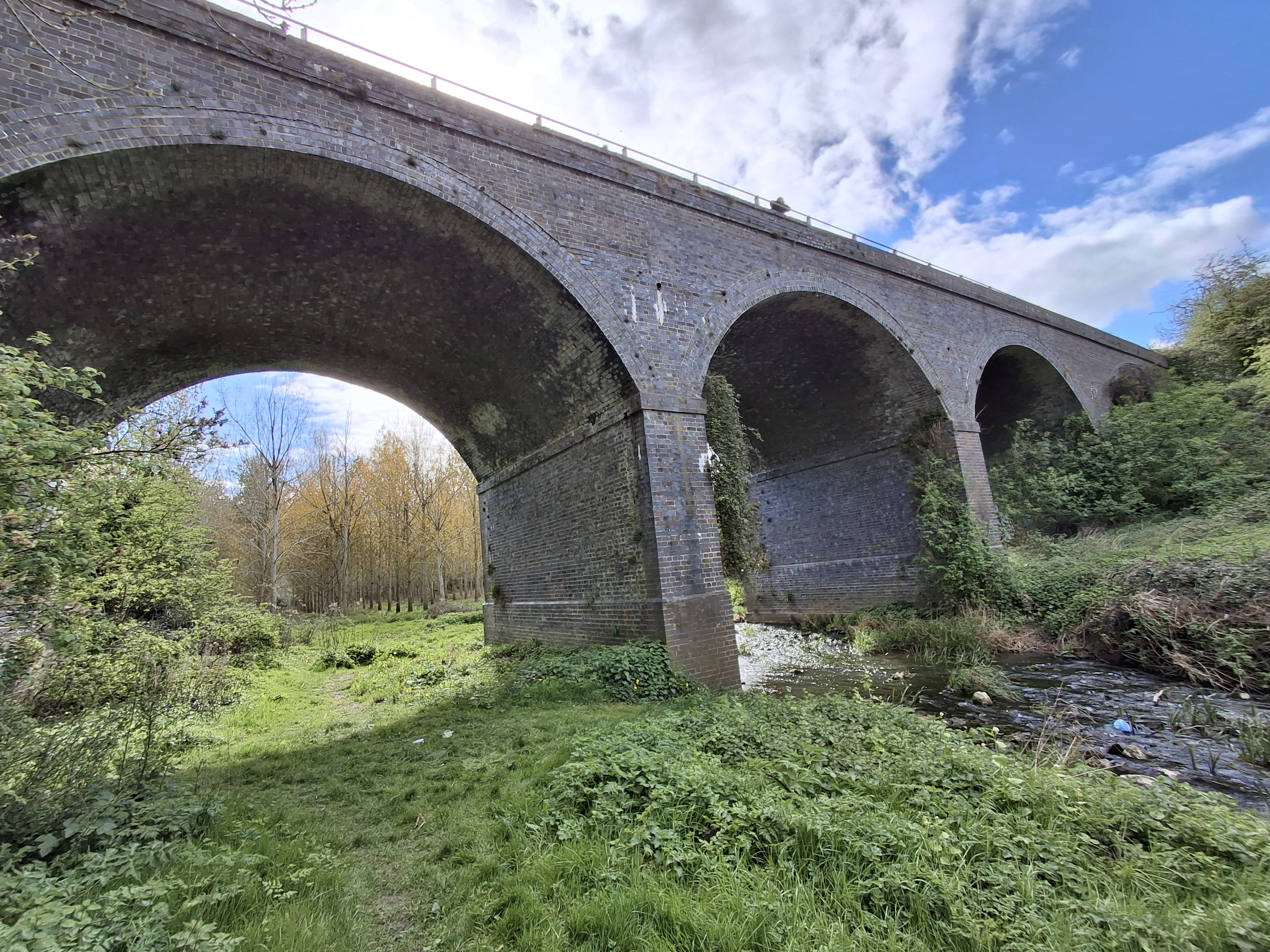
Disused railway viaduct over the River Itchen near Long Itchington/Bascote, Warwickshire, formerly carried the Weedon to Marton Junction railway line.

The line crossed the Grand Union Canal three times between Flecknoe and Marton Junction. At the westernmost of these crossings the canal bridge (still extant) was preceded by a five-arch brick viaduct (also still extant) across the River Itchen. The bridge and viaduct are now part of a footpath and cycle route.

== History ==
Daventry Railway Act 1862
- Act of Parliament
- Parliament of the United Kingdom
- Long title: An Act to authorize the making of a Railway from Daventry in the County of Northampton, to the London and North-western Railway near Weedon in the same County, and for other Purposes.
- Citation: 25 & 26 Vict. c. lv

Dates
- Royal assent: 30 June 1862

The market town of Daventry had been bypassed by the construction of the London and Birmingham Railway (L&BR) in the 1830s (now part of the West Coast Main Line) which passed to the east of the town through Weedon. Desiring a railway connection to their town, in 1861 a group of Daventry businessmen founded the Daventry Railway Company to promote the construction of a branch line to Daventry from Weedon. They successfully obtained the Daventry Railway Act 1862 (25 & 26 Vict. c. lv), however the company was unable to raise sufficient funds to build the scheme and it was abandoned.

Weedon and Daventry Railway Act 1868
- Act of Parliament
- Parliament of the United Kingdom
- Long title: An Act to incorporate a Company for making The Weedon and Daventry Railway; and for other Purposes.
- Citation: 31 & 32 Vict. c. clxxi

Dates
- Royal assent: 31 July 1868

The scheme was revived in the 1880s by the London and North Western Railway (LNWR) the successor to the L&BR, who constructed the line in two phases. Firstly, they obtained powers in the London and North Western Railway Act 1885 (48 & 49 Vict. c. lxxxviii) (Note: "The Weedon and Daventry Railway four miles three chains and five links in length commencing in the parish of Dodford in the county of Northampton on the west side of the Company's London and Birmingham Railway and at or near the bridge carrying the public road from Daventry to Northampton over that railway at the Weedon Station and terminating in the parish of Daventry in the same county on the south side of the road from Daventry to Long Buckby and two hundred and fifty yards or thereabouts north-east of Daventry Church." Section 4, London and North Western Railway Act 1885 (48 & 49 Vict. c. lxxxviii)) to construct a four-mile (6 km) long branch to Daventry from Weedon, this was opened on 1 March 1888. In the London and North Western Railway Act 1890 (53 & 54 Vict. c. cliv) (Note: "A railway (to be called the Daventry and Leamington Railway) fourteen miles six chains and twenty links in length commencing in the parish of Daventry in the county of Northampton by a junction with the Company's Weedon and Daventry Railway at or near its northern termination and terminating in the parish of Hunningham in the county of Warwick by a junction with the Company's Rugby and Leamington Railway at or near the bridge carrying Ridgeway Lane over that railway." Section 4, London and North Western Railway Act 1890 (53 & 54 Vict. c. cliv)) the LNWR obtained powers to build a 14-mile (22 km) extension of the branch to reach their existing Rugby–Leamington line at Marton Junction (just south of the village of Marton). The extension was opened on 1 August 1895.

The line was built with economy in mind, and contained some steep gradients of up to 1-in-80, especially near Daventry. In 1906 a railmotor was experimentally used on the line, however it proved to be underpowered. Passenger services reverted to push–pull operation with a conventional locomotive for the rest of the line's existence.

Ownership of the line passed to the London, Midland and Scottish Railway (LMS) in 1923, and then British Railways in 1948.

Passenger services originally consisted of four trains each way per day, with additional services between Weedon and Daventry, however by the 1920s and 30s this had grown to eleven trains each way per day, some of which continued to either Nuneaton or Northampton (requiring reversal at Blisworth). Additional trains also ran in the mornings and afternoons between Leamington and Flecknoe (later cut back to Napton) for the benefit of schoolchildren. A short lived slip coach service from London was introduced for a while in the 1900s but was not a success. The service was cut back sharply during World War II, and the pre-war timetable was never fully reintroduced. The growth in bus and car traffic meant that the passenger numbers declined from the 1940s onwards. Flecknoe station was the most remote station on the line and closed to passengers in 1952 but remained open for freight until 1956. All passenger services on the line were withdrawn on 13 September 1958.

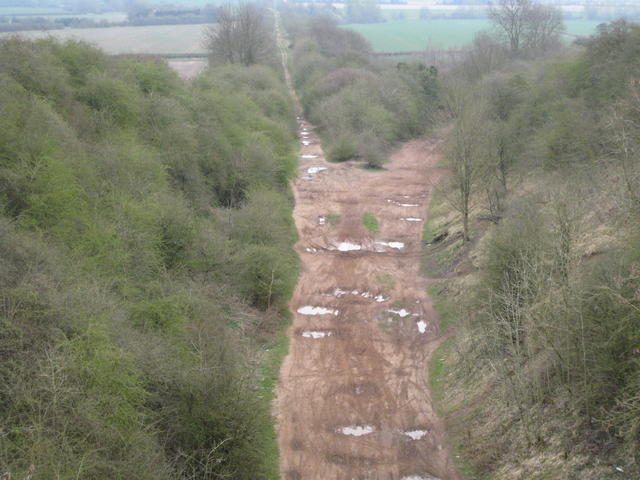
The site of Marton Junction in 2009: The line to Rugby ran straight ahead, whilst the line to Weedon diverged to the right.

The main source of freight traffic on the line was the cement works near Southam, and this provided enough traffic to keep the line open for a number of years after passenger services had been withdrawn. However, the line was closed as a through route in December 1963, and the tracks between Weedon and Southam were lifted the following year. A short section was retained between Marton Junction and Southam to serve the cement works, along with a stretch of the Rugby-Leamington line from Rugby. Freight trains running to Southam had to reverse at Marton Junction. This last stretch was closed on 20 June 1985, and the tracks were lifted in 1987.

== See also ==
- Leamington–Rugby line
- Coventry–Leamington line
