= River Leam =

River in Northamptonshire and Warwickshire, England

Coordinates: 52°17′N 1°33′W

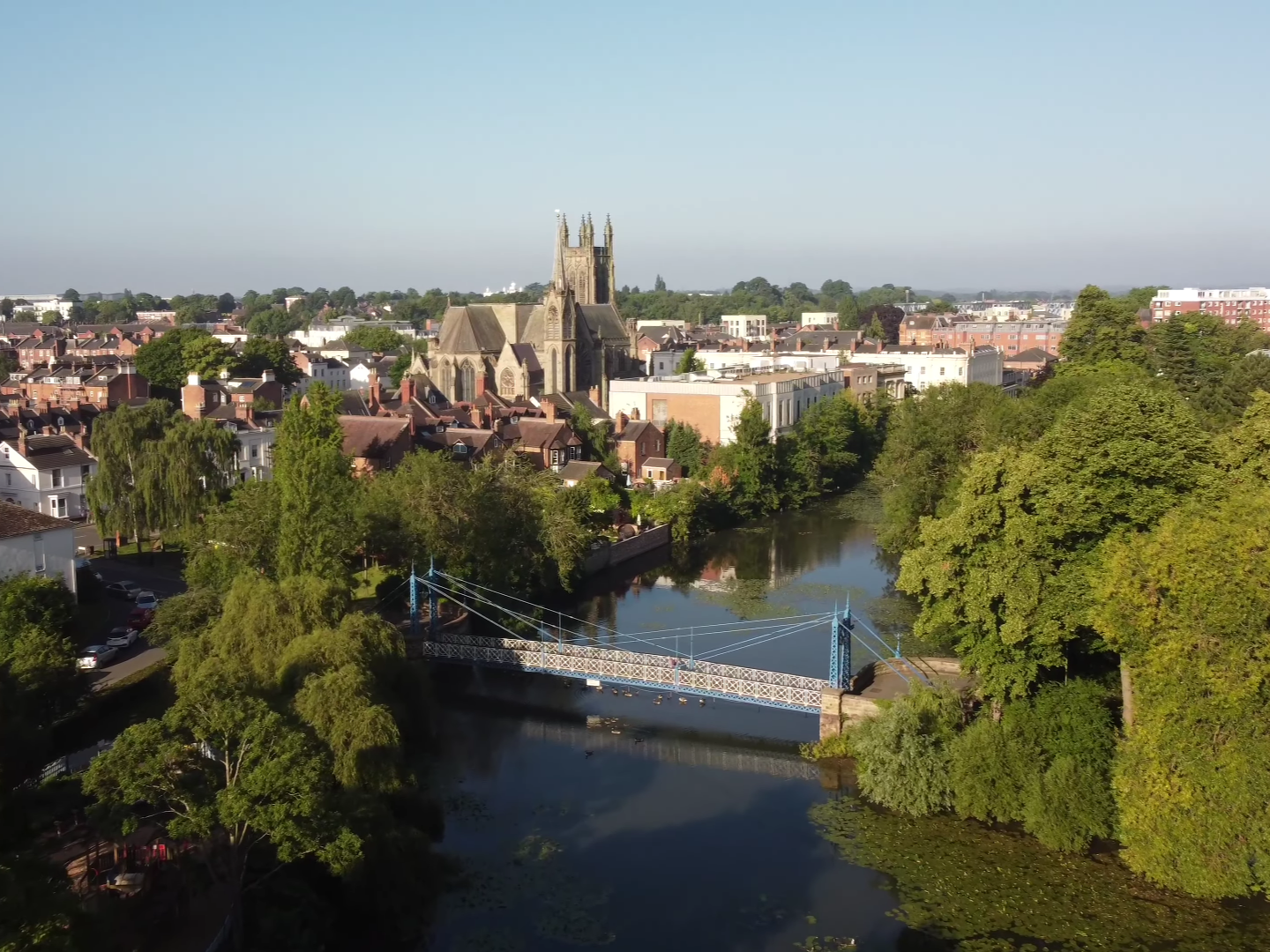
The River Leam in Leamington Spa

The River Leam (/lɛm/) is a river in England which rises at Hellidon Hill in Northamptonshire then flows through Warwickshire, including the town of Leamington Spa, named after it. It then flows into the River Avon near Warwick, which flows into the River Severn.

== Toponymy ==
The name is first recorded in 956 as Limenan, and derives from British Lemanā, meaning "elm-tree river".

== Tributaries ==
Its major tributaries are Rains Brook, River Itchen, River Stowe and Radford Brook.

== Water quality ==
The Environment Agency measures the water quality of the river systems in England. Each is given an overall ecological status, which may be one of five levels: 'high', 'good', 'moderate', 'poor' or 'bad'. There are several components that are used to determine this, including biological status, which looks at the quantity and varieties of invertebrates, angiosperms and fish. Chemical status, which compares the concentrations of various chemicals against known safe concentrations, is rated 'good' or 'fail'.

Water quality of the River Leam in 2019:

Section	Ecological Status	Chemical Status	Overall Status	Length	Catchment	Channel
Leam - source to conf Rains Bk	Poor	Fail	Poor	23.642 km (14.690 mi)	62.907 km^{2} (24.289 sq mi)	
Leam - conf Rains Brook to conf River Itchen	Moderate	Fail	Moderate	13.775 km (8.559 mi)	62.148 km^{2} (23.995 sq mi)	
Leam - conf River Itchen to conf River Avon	Poor	Fail	Poor	22.553 km (14.014 mi)	65.72 km^{2} (25.37 sq mi)	

== See also ==
- Rivers of the United Kingdom
