= A5 road (Great Britain) =

Major road in England and Wales

A5

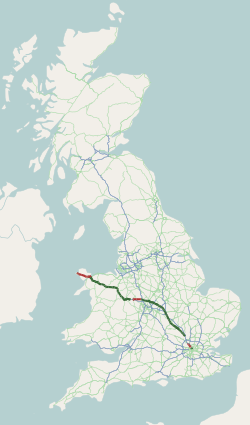

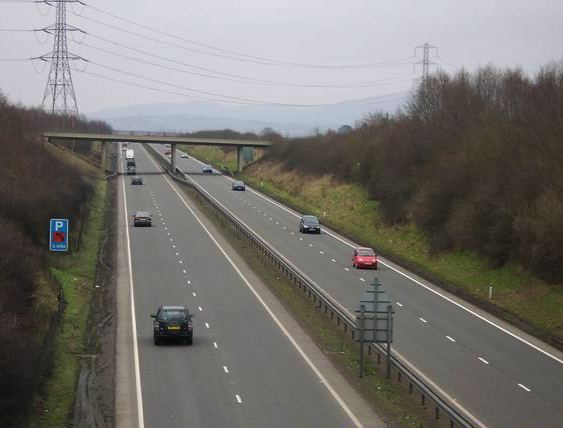
- A5 leaving Shrewsbury, Shropshire

Route information
- Maintained by National Highways (England) and North and Mid Wales Trunk Road Agent
- Length: 243.0 mi (391.1 km)

Major junctions
- Southeast end: Marble Arch, City of Westminster; 51.5133°N 0.1603°W
- M1; A43; A45; M69; M42; M6 Toll; M6; M54; A49; A55
- Northwest end: Port of Holyhead; 53.3063°N 4.6298°W

Location
- Country: United Kingdom
- Primary destinations: London, St Albans, Milton Keynes, Hinckley, Nuneaton, Tamworth, Cannock, Telford, Shrewsbury, Oswestry, Llangollen, Betws-y-Coed, Bangor, Holyhead

Road network
- Roads in the United Kingdom; Motorways; A and B road zones
← A4	→ A6

The A5 is a major road in England and Wales. It runs for about 243 miles (391 km) from London to the Irish Sea at the ferry port of Holyhead. In many parts the route follows that of the Roman Iter II route which later took the Anglo-Saxon name Watling Street. It forms most of the London–Holyhead trunk road.

== History ==
=== Roman road ===
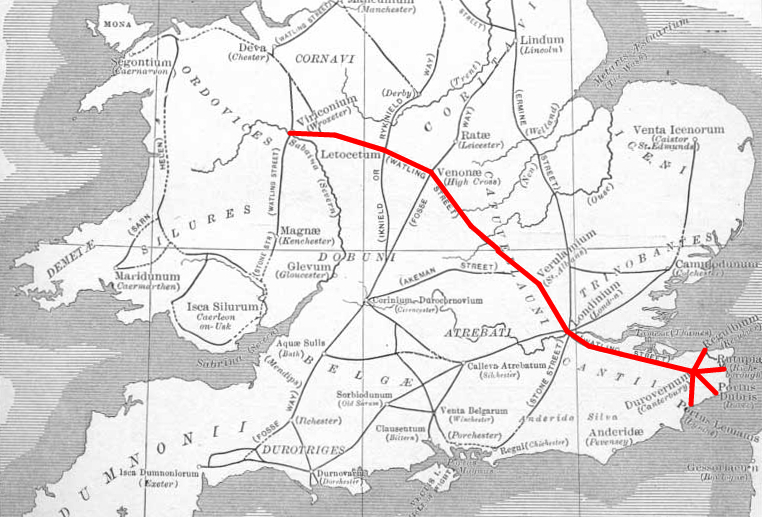
Roman Britain with Watling Street highlighted in red

The section of the A5 between London and Shrewsbury is roughly contiguous with one of the principal Roman roads in Britain: that between Londinium (modern-day London) and Deva (modern-day Chester), which diverges from the present-day A5 corridor at Wroxeter (Viroconium Cornoviorum) near Shrewsbury.

=== Telford's Holyhead Road ===
Holyhead Roads Act 1815
- Act of Parliament
- Parliament of the United Kingdom
- Long title: An Act for granting to His Majesty the Sum of Twenty thousand Pounds, to be issued and applied towards repairing Roads between London and Holyhead, by Chester, and between London and Bangor, by Shrewsbury.
- Citation: 55 Geo. 3. c. 152
- Territorial extent: United Kingdom

Dates
- Royal assent: 11 July 1815
- Commencement: 11 July 1815 (Note: The Acts of Parliament (Commencement) Act 1793.)
- Repealed: 31 January 2013
Other legislation
Amended by	Roads Between London and Holyhead Act 1819
Repealed by	Statute Law (Repeals) Act 2013

Status: Repealed

Text of statute as originally enacted

Roads Between London and Holyhead Act 1819
- Act of Parliament
- Parliament of the United Kingdom
- Long title: An Act to amend an Act passed in the Fifty fifth Year of His present Majesty,] for granting to His Majesty the Sum of Twenty thousand Pounds towards repairing Roads between London and Holyhead by Chester, and between London and Bangor by Shrewsbury; and for giving additional Powers to the Commissioners therein named, to build a Bridge over the Menai Straits, and to make a new Road from Bangor Ferry to Holyhead, in the County of Anglesea.
- Citation: 59 Geo. 3. c. 48
- Territorial extent: United Kingdom

Dates
- Royal assent: 2 July 1819
- Commencement: 2 July 1819
Other legislation
Amends	Holyhead Roads Act 1815

Status: Amended

Text of statute as originally enacted

Holyhead Road Act 1836
- Act of Parliament
- Parliament of the United Kingdom
- Long title: An Act for further improving the Road between London and Holyhead, by Coventry, Birmingham, and Shrewsbury.
- Citation: 6 & 7 Will. 4. c. 35
- Territorial extent: United Kingdom

Dates
- Royal assent: 14 July 1836
- Commencement: 14 July 1836
- Repealed: 31 January 2013
Other legislation
Repealed by	Statute Law (Repeals) Act 2013

Status: Repealed

Text of statute as originally enacted

Holyhead Road Relief Act 1861 (Note: Section 1.)
- Act of Parliament
- Parliament of the United Kingdom
- Long title: An Act to relieve certain Trusts on the Holyhead Road from Debts.
- Citation: 24 & 25 Vict. c. 28
- Territorial extent: United Kingdom

Dates
- Royal assent: 11 July 1861
- Commencement: 11 July 1861
- Repealed: 31 January 2013
Other legislation
Repealed by	Statute Law (Repeals) Act 2013

Status: Repealed

Text of statute as originally enacted

The Act of Union 1800, which unified Great Britain and Ireland, gave rise to a need to improve communication links between London and Dublin. A parliamentary committee led to an act of Parliament, the Holyhead Roads Act 1815 (55 Geo. 3. c. 152) that authorised the purchase of existing turnpike road interests and, where necessary, the construction of new road, to complete the route between the two capitals. This made it the first major civilian state-funded road building project in Britain since Roman times. Responsibility for establishing the new route was awarded to the famous engineer, Thomas Telford.

Through England, the road largely took over existing turnpike roads and mainly following the route of the Anglo-Saxon Wæcelinga Stræt (Watling Street), much of which had been historically the Roman road Iter II. However between Weedon, Northamptonshire and Oakengates, Telford's Holyhead Road eschews the Watling Street corridor, picking up instead the major cities of Coventry, Birmingham, and Wolverhampton;this routing being far more useful for communications.

From Shrewsbury and through Wales, Telford's work was more extensive. In places he followed existing roads, but he also built new links, including the Menai Suspension Bridge to connect the mainland with Anglesey and the Stanley Embankment to Holy Island.

Telford's road was complete with the opening of the Menai Suspension Bridge in 1826, which had been authorised by the Roads Between London and Holyhead Act 1819 (59 Geo. 3. c. 48).

=== Notable features of Telford's road ===
The road was designed to allow stagecoaches and the mail coach to carry post between London and Holyhead, and thence by mailboat to Ireland. Therefore, throughout its length the gradient never exceeds 1:17 (5.9%).

The route through Wales retains many of the original features of Telford's road and has, since 1995, been recognised as a historic route worthy of preservation. An 18-month survey by Cadw in 1998–2000 revealed that about 40% of the original road and its ancillary features survives under the modern A5, much more than previously thought. These features include the following:

- many surviving and distinctive toll houses
- 'depots' along the route, being roadside alcoves to store grit and materials
- distinctive milestones at each mile – many originals having survived and been restored, others now replaced by replicas
- distinctive gates in a 'sunburst' design, a few of which have survived
- a weighbridge at Lon Isaf, between Bangor and Bethesda

On 1 April 1937, the route was classed as part of the London–Holyhead trunk road.

==== Tŷ Nant cutting ====
In 1997, a section of bends on Telford's road between Tŷ Nant and Dinmael was by-passed by a modern cutting. However, investigation in 2006 revealed that the rock face in the cutting had become unstable, and the A5 was closed from the end of May 2006. Traffic was diverted onto the old A5 route, on a 0.5-mile (0.80 km) stretch known as the Glyn Bends, while the rock face was made safe. This involved the removal of 230,000 tonnes of rock and alluvial deposits. In July 2007, the A5 through the reconstructed cutting was reopened.

== Route ==
=== London–Milton Keynes ===
Starting at Marble Arch in London, the A5 runs northwest on the Edgware Road through Kilburn and Cricklewood. The A5 number disappears at the A41 near Edgware but the original road continues as the A5183 through Elstree, Radlett, St Albans, Redbourn and Dunstable.

=== Milton Keynes–Hinckley ===
On entering the City of Milton Keynes, the road becomes an (almost) fully grade-separated dual carriageway and passes through Milton Keynes. This stretch was opened in 1980, replacing the original route along Watling Street. From just north of the city, after entering Northamptonshire, the road resumes as a single carriageway that continues through Towcester where it crosses the A43 dual carriageway just north of the town. The road accompanies the Grand Union Canal and the M1 motorway through the Watford Gap. It then bridges the M45 motorway and continues to Kilsby. As it passes close to Rugby, the road is diverted slightly around the Daventry International Rail Freight Terminal and then passes the remains of the Rugby Radio Station.

The next phase north-west-bound takes it under the M6 motorway and passing close to Lutterworth. Along this stretch, the road frequently alternates between being a single and a dual carriageway. After meeting the M69 motorway at a roundabout, with the motorway passing above, the A5 runs between Nuneaton and Hinckley.

=== Hinckley–Shrewsbury ===
After this section the road continues to run through the northern fringes of Nuneaton and then on to Tamworth. At Tamworth, the road follows a more recent dual carriageway bypass, permitting the original alignment to become a local road in the town. From this point the road is a grade separated dual carriageway up until its junction with the A38 and M6 toll. After this junction it passes just to the south of Cannock and then, after its final junction with the A41, enters Telford, where it loses its identity and route-shares with the M54 motorway from junction 5. At junction 7 the motorway ends and the A5 continues to Shrewsbury as dual carriageway, on its new alignment. (The original route through Telford, and then via Atcham to Shrewsbury, is unclassified through Oakengates and as the B5061 through Wellington and the B4380 through Atcham). At the cutting through Overley Hill is an exposure of bedrock called Uriconian rhyolite formed from volcanic lava. The route runs around Shrewsbury as the town's southern bypass (still as dual carriageway), combining for a stretch with the A49. (The route once ran through the town, but was first bypassed in the 1930s, then by-passed again in the early 1990s).

=== Shrewsbury–Bangor ===
After Shrewsbury, the A5 continues as single-carriageway except for the Nesscliffe bypass. It then multiplexes with the major South Wales–North Wales road A483 and forms part of the Oswestry bypass, running to the east of that town. Shortly after, it crosses the River Ceiriog and enters Wales to continue from Chirk. The A5 continues through to Snowdonia via Llangollen, Corwen, Capel Curig and through the centre of Bangor.

=== Bangor–Holyhead ===
From Bangor the road crosses the Menai Suspension Bridge to Anglesey and then runs roughly parallel to the A55 expressway to the outskirts of the village of Valley where the A5 continues onto the Stanley Embankment. The A5 from Valley to Holyhead is named London Road running through to the Port of Holyhead. The A5 traditionally terminated at Admiralty Arch (1822–24) on Salt Island, which was designed by Thomas Harrison to commemorate a visit by King George IV in 1821 en route to Ireland and marks the zenith of Irish Mail coach operations. The A5 currently terminates at the junction of the A55 near the Port of Holyhead.

== Junction list ==
=== First segment ===
County	Location	mi	km	Destinations	Notes
Greater London	Westminster	0.0	0.0	A402 west (Bayswater Road) / Park Lane (A4202 south) / Oxford Street (A40 east) to A3 / A4 – Westminster, Notting Hill Gate	South-eastern terminus; south-eastern terminus of A40 concurrency; northern terminus of A4202; eastern terminus of A402
Greater London	Westminster	0.08	0.13	Wigmore Street (A5204 east) / Seymour Street	No access from A5 to A5204; western terminus of A5204
Greater London	Westminster	0.5	0.80	Old Marylebone Road (A501 east) / Sussex Gardens (A4209 south-west)	No access from A5 to A501/A4209, from A501 to A5 north, or from A4209 to A5 south; north-eastern terminus of A4209
Greater London	Westminster	0.6	0.97	Chapel Street to A40	South-east access only
Greater London	Westminster	0.6	0.97	Harrow Road (A404 west) to A40 – Oxford, Wembley, Ealing, Paddington	North-west access only; virtual north-western terminus of A40 concurrency; eastern terminus of A404
Greater London	Westminster	0.6	0.97	Ring Road east to A400 / A1 – The City, Euston, King's Cross	South-east access only
Greater London	Westminster	1.2	1.9	St. John's Wood Road (A5205 north-east) to M1 / A41 – The North, Brent Cross, St. John's Wood	Destinations signed north-west only; south-western terminus of A5205
Greater London	Brent	2.6	4.2	Willesden Lane (A4003 north-west) – Willesden, Neasden	Destinations signed north-west only; south-eastern terminus of A4003
Greater London	Barnet—Brent borough boundary	3.8	6.1	A407 (Cricklewood Lane / Chichele Road) to A598 – Golders Green, Willesden Green, Harlesden	Information signed north-west only
Greater London	Barnet—Brent borough boundary	4.9– 5.3	7.9– 8.5	A406 (North Circular Road) to M1 / M25 – Wembley, Brent Cross	To M25 south-east only
Greater London	Barnet	5.7	9.2	Herbert Road (A504 east)	Western terminus of A504
Greater London	Barnet―Brent borough boundary	6.2	10.0	A4006 west (Kingsbury Road) – Kingsbury, Kenton, Harrow	Harrow signed north-west only; eastern terminus of A4006
Greater London	Barnet―Brent borough boundary	6.8	10.9	Colindeep Lane (A5150 east) to A41 – Hendon Central	Western terminus of A5150
Greater London	Barnet―Harrow borough boundary	8.2	13.2	Deansbrook Road (A5109 east) / Camrose Avenue to A5100 – Mill Hill, Queensbury	Western terminus of A5109
Greater London	Barnet―Harrow borough boundary	8.5	13.7	A5100 east (Station Road) / Camrose Avenue (B461) – Mill Hill	Information signed north-west only; western terminus of A5100
Greater London	Barnet―Harrow borough boundary	9.4	15.1	A410 (Spur Road / London Road) to M1 / M25 / A41 / A1 / A409 / A4006 – Aylesbury, Watford, Mill Hill, Harrow, Wealdstone, Stanmore, Brent Cross	Aylesbury signed north-west only, Brent Cross south-east only
Greater London― Hertfordshire boundary	London Borough of Barnet—Harrow— Elstree boundary	10.7	17.2	A41 (North Western By-Pass) / A5183 (Elstree Hill South) to M1 / M25 – Central London, Brent Cross, Aylesbury, Watford, Elstree	North-western terminus of southern segment; southern terminus of A5183
1.000 mi = 1.609 km; 1.000 km = 0.621 mi

=== Second segment ===
County	Location	mi	km	Destinations	Notes
Bedfordshire		0.0	0.0	M1 / A5505 south – London, Luton, The North, Bedford, Dunstable, Houghton Regis	South-eastern terminus; northern terminus of A5505
Bedfordshire	Dunstable town boundary	2.9	4.7	A505 (Watling Street) / Thorn Road to B5120 – Aylesbury, Luton, Leighton Buzzard, Dunstable	To B5120 and Dunstable signed south-east only
Bedfordshire	Hockliffe	4.9	7.9	A4012 west (Leighton Road) – Leighton Buzzard	Eastern terminus of A4012
Buckinghamshire (City of Milton Keynes)		9.6– 10.3	15.4– 16.6	Little Brickhill, Great Brickhill, Woburn	Grade-separated junction; Woburn signed south-east only
Buckinghamshire (City of Milton Keynes)		11.6	18.7	A4146 south / Brickhill Road / Watling Street to A418 / A421 – Aylesbury, Leighton Buzzard, Bedford, Great Brickhill, Stoke Hammond, Water Eaton, Woburn Sands, Bow Brickhill, Bletchley, Fenny Stratford	South-eastern terminus of A4146 concurrency
Buckinghamshire (City of Milton Keynes)		11.6	18.7	Begin freeway	
Buckinghamshire (City of Milton Keynes)		12.5– 13.1	20.1– 21.1	A4146 – Milton Keynes (south & east), Bletchley industry	North-western terminus of A4146 concurrency
Buckinghamshire (City of Milton Keynes)		13.9– 14.4	22.4– 23.2	A421 to M1 – Milton Keynes (south), Buckingham	
Buckinghamshire (City of Milton Keynes)		16.6– 17.1	26.7– 27.5	A509 – Milton Keynes (central and east)	Southern terminus of A509
Buckinghamshire (City of Milton Keynes)		17.7– 18.2	28.5– 29.3	A422 east – Milton Keynes (north), Bedford, Newport Pagnell, Wolverton	Newport Pagnell and Wolverton signed south-east only; south-eastern terminus of A422 concurrency
Northamptonshire		21.2	34.1	End freeway	
Northamptonshire	Old Stratford	21.2	34.1	A508 north / A422 west to M1 north – Northampton, Buckingham, Cosgrove, Yardley Gobion, Deanshanger	North-western terminus of A422 concurrency; southern terminus of A508
Northamptonshire	Towcester	28.6	46.0	A43 / Towcester Road to M1 / M40 / A4525 – Northampton, Oxford, Brackley, Banbury, Blisworth, Tiffield, Greens Norton	
Northamptonshire		36.4	58.6	A45 to M1 / A4500 – Northampton, Coventry, Daventry	
Northamptonshire	Kilsby	44.5	71.6	A361 south-west (Daventry Road) to B4038 – Daventry, Banbury, Barby	North-eastern terminus of A361
Northamptonshire		45.8	73.7	A428 (Crick Road) to M1 / M6 – Northampton, Rugby	
Northamptonshire		46.2	74.4	A5 Spur south-east to M1 / M6 – Milton Keynes, Northampton	Information signed north-west only; north-western terminus of A5 Spur
Leicestershire― Warwickshire county boundary		51.2	82.4	A426 (Rugby Road) / Gibbet Road to M6 / A14 – Lutterworth, Rugby, Coventry, Kettering, Shawell	Coventry and Kettering signed north-west only
Leicestershire― Warwickshire county boundary		53.6	86.3	A4303 east (Coventry Road) / B4027 (Lutterworth Road) / Coal Pit Lane – Lutterworth, Brinklow, Pailton, Willey	Western terminus of A4303
Leicestershire― Warwickshire county boundary		60.1	96.7	M69 / B4109 / M1 / M6 – Leicester, Birmingham, Coventry, Hinckley, Wolvey	M69 junction 1
Leicestershire― Warwickshire county boundary	Hinckley	62.7	100.9	A47 east (Dodwells Road) / B4666 (Coventry Road) to A447 – Earl Shilton, Market Bosworth, Hinckley town centre	South-eastern terminus of A47 concurrency
Leicestershire― Warwickshire county boundary	Hinckley	63.1	101.5	A47 west (The Long Shoot) – Nuneaton	North-western terminus of A47
Leicestershire― Warwickshire county boundary		66.0	106.2	A444 south (Weddington Lane) – Nuneaton	South-eastern terminus of A444 concurrency
Leicestershire― Warwickshire county boundary		66.1	106.4	A444 north (Atherstone Road) to A42 – Burton, Ashby, Twycross, Sibson, Fenny Drayton	North-western terminus of A444 concurrency
Warwickshire	Atherstone	69.5	111.8	Atherstone (B4116)	Grade-separated junction; south-east exit and north-west entrance
Warwickshire		73.6– 73.8	118.4– 118.8	M42 / Trinity Road to M1 / M6 / M5 / M40 – The North, Nottingham, Burton upon Trent, The South West, Coventry, Birmingham, Kingsbury	M42 junction 10
Warwickshire		73.8	118.8	Begin freeway	
Staffordshire	Wilnecote	73.9	118.9	B5404 / B5080 – Wilnecote, Fazeley, Stonydelph	B5404, Wilnecote, and Fazeley signed north-west only
Staffordshire	Tamworth	75.2– 75.7	121.0– 121.8	B5440 – Wilnecote, Glascote	
Staffordshire	Tamworth	76.7– 77.1	123.4– 124.1	To A51 – Tamworth	
Staffordshire		77.5– 77.8	124.7– 125.2	A453 to A38 – Sutton Coldfield, Birmingham, Fazeley, Hopwas, Whittington, Hints	No westbound entrance; To A38, Birmingham, Whittington, and Hints signed north-west only
Staffordshire		81.3	130.8	End freeway	
Staffordshire		81.3– 81.6	130.8– 131.3	M6 Toll / A38 / Roman Road to M6 / M42 south – The North, The West, The South, Cannock, Coventry, Birmingham, Burton, Lichfield, Hints, Weeford	The North, The West, and Cannock signed north-west only; M6 Toll junction T4
Staffordshire		82.9– 83.1	133.4– 133.7	A5148 north-east (Birmingham Road) / A5127 to M6 Toll north / A38 – Burton, Lichfield, Sutton Coldfield	To M6 Toll north signed north-west only; south-western terminus of A5148
Staffordshire	Muckley Corner	85.1	137.0	A461 (Walsall Road) – Lichfield, Walsall	
Staffordshire― West Midlands county boundary	Brownhills town boundary	86.8	139.7	A5195 north-west / B5011 (Chase Road) to M6 Toll / M6 – Cannock, Burntwood, Brownhills	To M6 signed north-west only, B5011 and Brownshills south-east only; south-eastern terminus of A5195
West Midlands	Brownhills	88.0	141.6	A452 south-east (Chester Road North) / Wilkin Road – Brownhills	North-western terminus of A452
Staffordshire	Cannock Chase― Great Wyrley boundary	91.1– 91.4	146.6– 147.1	M6 Toll south / A34 (Walsall Road) / A460 (Lodge Lane) to M6 – The South, Burntwood, Walsall, Cannock, Rugeley, Wolverhampton	
Staffordshire	Cannock Chase	92.6	149.0	A4601 to M6 south / A460 – Cannock, Wolverhampton	
Staffordshire		95.0	152.9	M6 to M6 Toll – The North West, The South, Stoke-on-Trent, Stafford, Birmingham	M6 junction 12
Staffordshire	Gailey	96.2	154.8	A449 to M54 – Stafford, Wolverhampton, Telford	To M54 and Telford signed north-west only
Staffordshire― Shropshire county boundary		104.2	167.7	A41 to M54 / M6 – Whitchurch, Shropshire, Wolverhampton	To M6 signed south-east only
Shropshire	Telford	108.5	174.6	A4640 (Redhill Way / Castle Farm Way) to M54 / A518 – Stafford, Donnington, Priorslee	
Shropshire	Telford	110.0	177.0	A442 / Stafford Park 1 / Hollinsgate to A518 – Whitchurch, Stafford, Bridgnorth, Telford city centre	Grade-separated junction on A442
Shropshire	Telford	110.6	178.0	M54 east / B5072 / Forge Gate to M6 – Birmingham, Lawley, Telford city centre	South-eastern terminus of M54 concurrency; M54 junction 5
Shropshire	Telford	112.1– 112.8	180.4– 181.5	A5223 to A442 – Telford (west), Whitchurch, Ironbridge	Ironbridge signed south-east only; M54 junction 6
Shropshire		114.1– 115.1	183.6– 185.2	B5061 – Wellington	North-western terminus of M54 concurrency; western terminus of M54; M54 junction 7
Shropshire		121.5	195.5	A49 north to A53 – Whitchurch, Newcastle	South-eastern terminus of A49 concurrency
Shropshire		122.6	197.3	A5064 north-west (London Road) / B4380 (Thieves' Lane / Emstrey Bank) / A458 – Shrewsbury, Bridgnorth, Much Wenlock, Ironbridge, Cross Houses, Atcham, Wroxeter	
Shropshire		123.4	198.6	A458 – Shrewsbury, Bridgnorth, Cross Houses, Much Wenlock	Grade-separated junction; south-east exit and north-west entrance
Shropshire	Shrewsbury town boundary	124.8	200.8	A49 south (Hereford Road) / A5112 north-east – Shrewsbury, Leominster	North-western terminus of A49 concurrency; south-western terminus of A5112
Shropshire	Edgebold	126.8	204.1	A488 (Hanwood Road) – Shrewsbury (west), Bishop's Castle, Hanwood, Pontesbury, Minsterley	
Shropshire		128.8	207.3	A458 (Welshpool Road) – Shrewsbury, Mid Wales, Welshpool, Bicton Heath, Shelton	Mid Wales signed north-west only
Shropshire		141.8– 142.1	228.2– 228.7	A483 south / B4579 (Shrewsbury Road) – Welshpool, Oswestry	South-eastern terminus of A483 concurrency
Shropshire	Oswestry	143.4	230.8	A495 north-east / B4580 (Whittington Road) – Whitchurch, Oswestry, Ellesmere, Whittington	South-western terminus of A495
Shropshire― Wrexham boundary		147.6	237.5	River Ceiriog; England―Wales boundary	
Wrexham		149.2	240.1	A483 north – Wrexham	North-western terminus of A483 concurrency
Denbighshire	Llangollen	155.1	249.6	Castle Street (A539 east) to A542 – Ruthin	North-west signage
Denbighshire	Llangollen	155.1	249.6	A539 east (Castle Street) – Ruabon	South-east signage
Denbighshire		166.1	267.3	A494 north-east to A5104 – Ruthin, Chester	South-eastern terminus of A494 concurrency
Denbighshire	Druid	167.5	269.6	A494 south-west – Bala	North-western terminus of A494
Conwy	Pentrefoelas	179.9	289.5	A543 north-east – Denbigh	South-western terminus of A543
Conwy		186.3	299.8	A470 south – Dolgellau, Dolwyddelan, Blaenau Ffestiniog	South-eastern terminus of A470 concurrency
Conwy		186.4	300.0	A470 north to A55 – Llandudno, Conwy	North-western terminus of A470 concurrency
Conwy	Capel Curig	192.4	309.6	A4086 west to A498 – Caernarfon, Porthmadog	Eastern terminus of A4086
Gwynedd		204.8	329.6	A4244 south (Felln Hen Road) – Llanberis, Pentir	Pentir signed north-west only; northern terminus of A4244
Gwynedd		204.9	329.8	A55 (North Wales Expressway) to A487 – Conwy, Holyhead, Caernarfon	To A487 and Caernarfon signed south-east only; A55 junction 11
Gwynedd	Bangor	208.5	335.5	A4087 south-west (Caernarfon Road) to A487 / A55 – Holyhead	North-eastern terminus of A4087
Gwynedd	Bangor	210.3	338.4	A487 south (Treborth Road) to A55 / A5 – Caernarfon, Conwy, Holyhead, Betws-y-coed	Holyhead signed north-west only; northern terminus of A487
Gwynedd―Anglesey county boundary	Bangor―Menai Bridge boundary	210.4– 210.7	338.6– 339.1	Menai Suspension Bridge over Swellies (Menai Strait)	
Anglesey	Menai Bridge	210.7	339.1	A545 north-east (Telford Road) – Town centre, Beaumaris	Town centre signed north-west only; south-western terminus of A545
Anglesey	Llanfairpwllgwyngyll	212.0	341.2	A55 east (North Wales Expressway) to A487 – Bangor, Caernarfon	Access only from A55 west to A5 and from A5 to A55 east; A55 junction 8A
Anglesey	Llanfairpwllgwyngyll	212.5	342.0	A4080 west (Brynsiencyn Road) – Newborough	Eastern terminus of A4080
Anglesey		215.0	346.0	A5152 to A55 – Holyhead, Bangor	Southern terminus of A5152
Anglesey		218.1	351.0	A55 (North Wales Expressway) / A5114 north – Bangor, Holyhead, Llangefni	Southern terminus of A5114; A55 junction 6
Anglesey		223.9	360.3	A4080 east / B5112 to A55 – Rhosneigr, Aberffraw, Llannerch-y-medd	Western terminus of A4080
Anglesey		226.7	364.8	A55 (North Wales Expressway) / Minffordd Road – Bangor, Holyhead, Bodedern, Llanfihangel yn Nhowyn	A55 junction 4
Anglesey		228.3	367.4	A55 (North Wales Expressway) – Bangor, Holyhead	A55 junction 3
Anglesey	Valley	228.8	368.2	A5025 / B4545 (Station Road) – Amlwch, Trearddur Bay	Western terminus of A5025
Anglesey	Holyhead	231.7	372.9	A5153 south-west to A55 – Holyhead, Bangor	Holyhead signed north-west only, Bangor south-east only; north-eastern terminus of A5153
Anglesey	Holyhead	232.3	373.9	A55 east (London Road) to A5154 – Town centre, Bangor	North-western terminus; no access from A5 to A55 west
1.000 mi = 1.609 km; 1.000 km = 0.621 mi

== Road safety ==
In June 2008, a 9.9-mile (16 km) stretch of the A5 between Daventry and Rugby was named as the most dangerous road in the East Midlands. This single carriageway stretch had 15 fatal and serious injury collisions between 2004 and 2006, and was rated as 'red'—the second highest risk band—in the EuroRAP report published by the Road Safety Foundation.

== Gallery ==
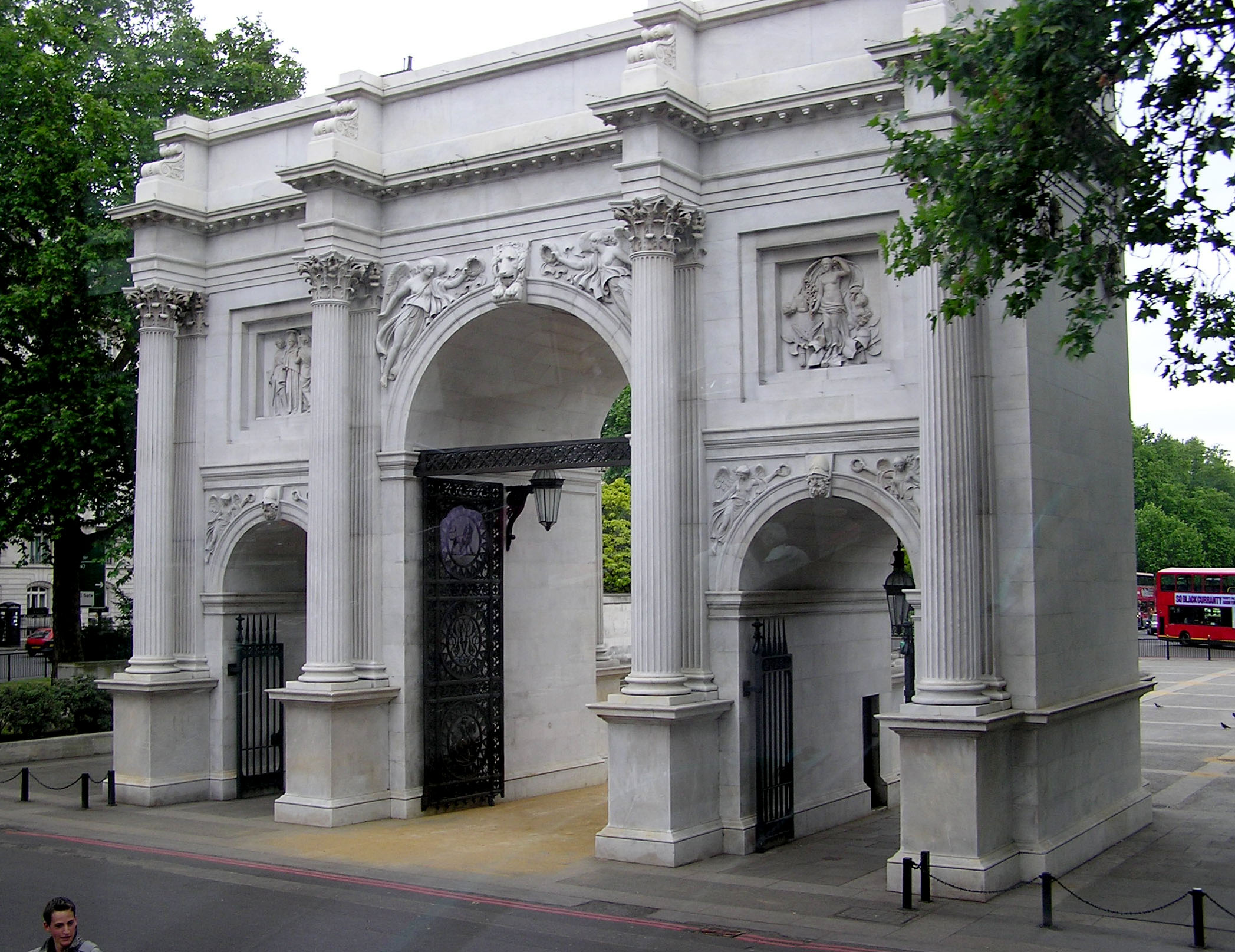
Marble Arch, London
– start of the A5

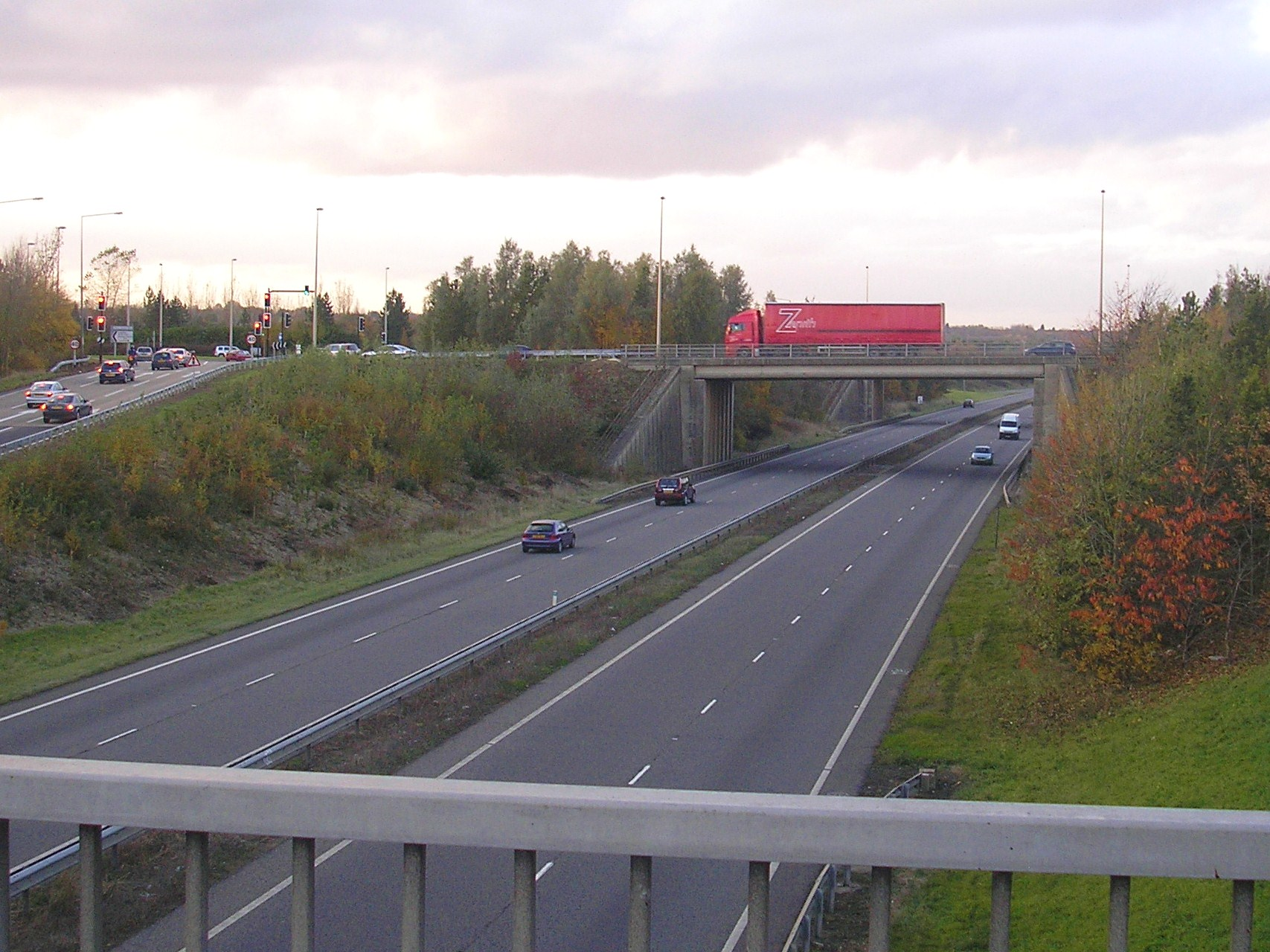
A5 at Milton Keynes looking north at its junction with the A509

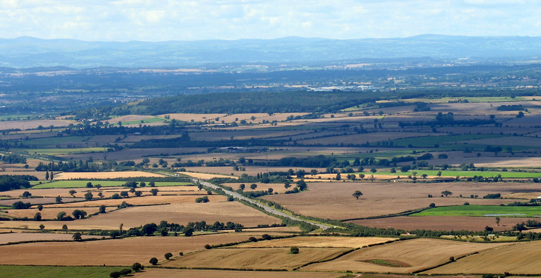
The A5 as it traverses rural Shropshire near Wellington on a new alignment to that of the original Thomas Telford route

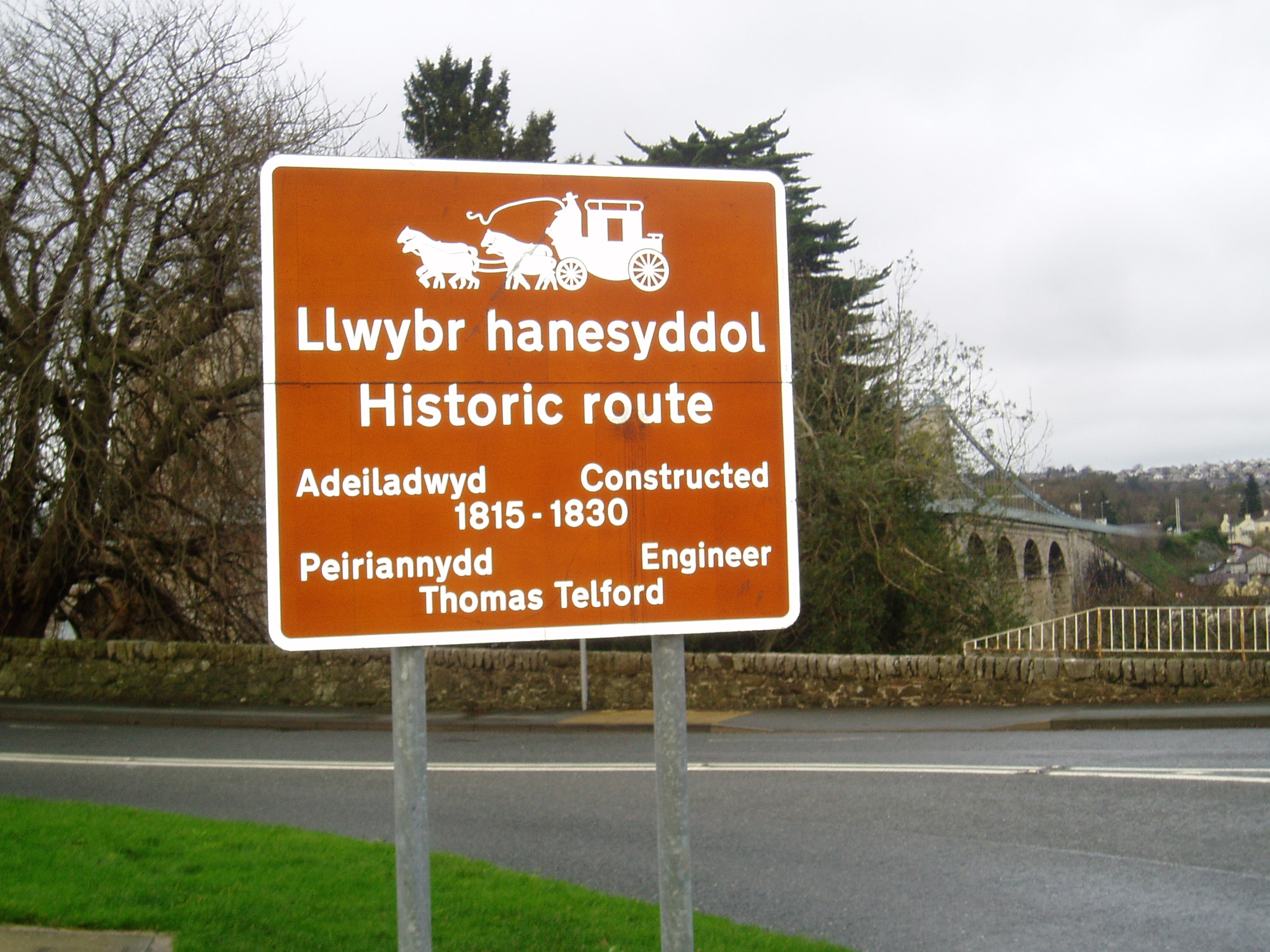
Sign of Thomas Telford's historic route

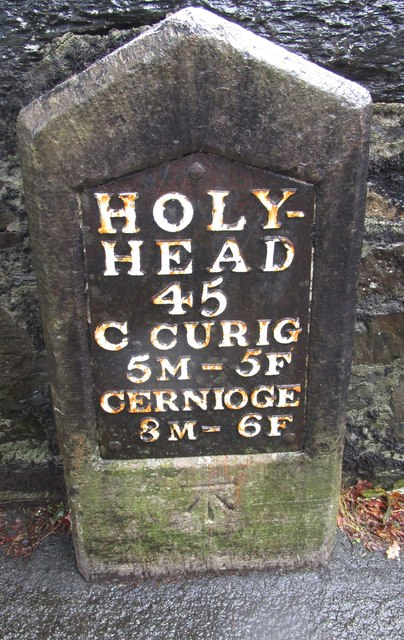
Milestone 45 miles from Holyhead

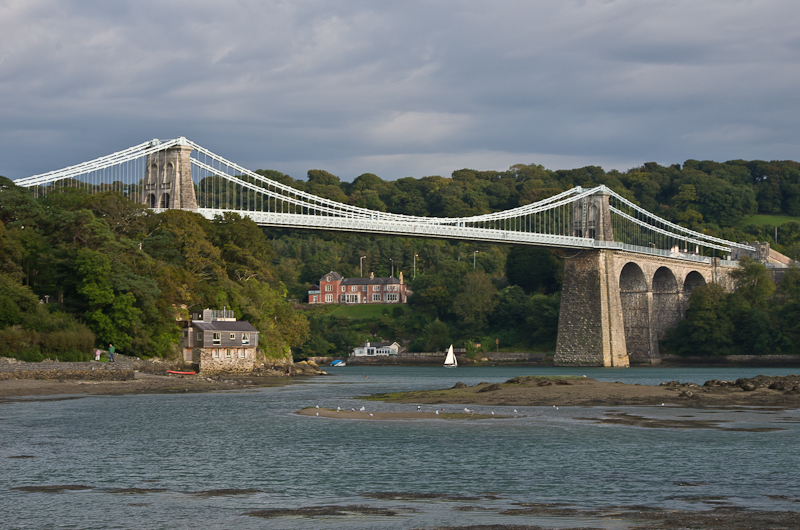
The A5 crosses the Menai Strait using the Menai Suspension Bridge

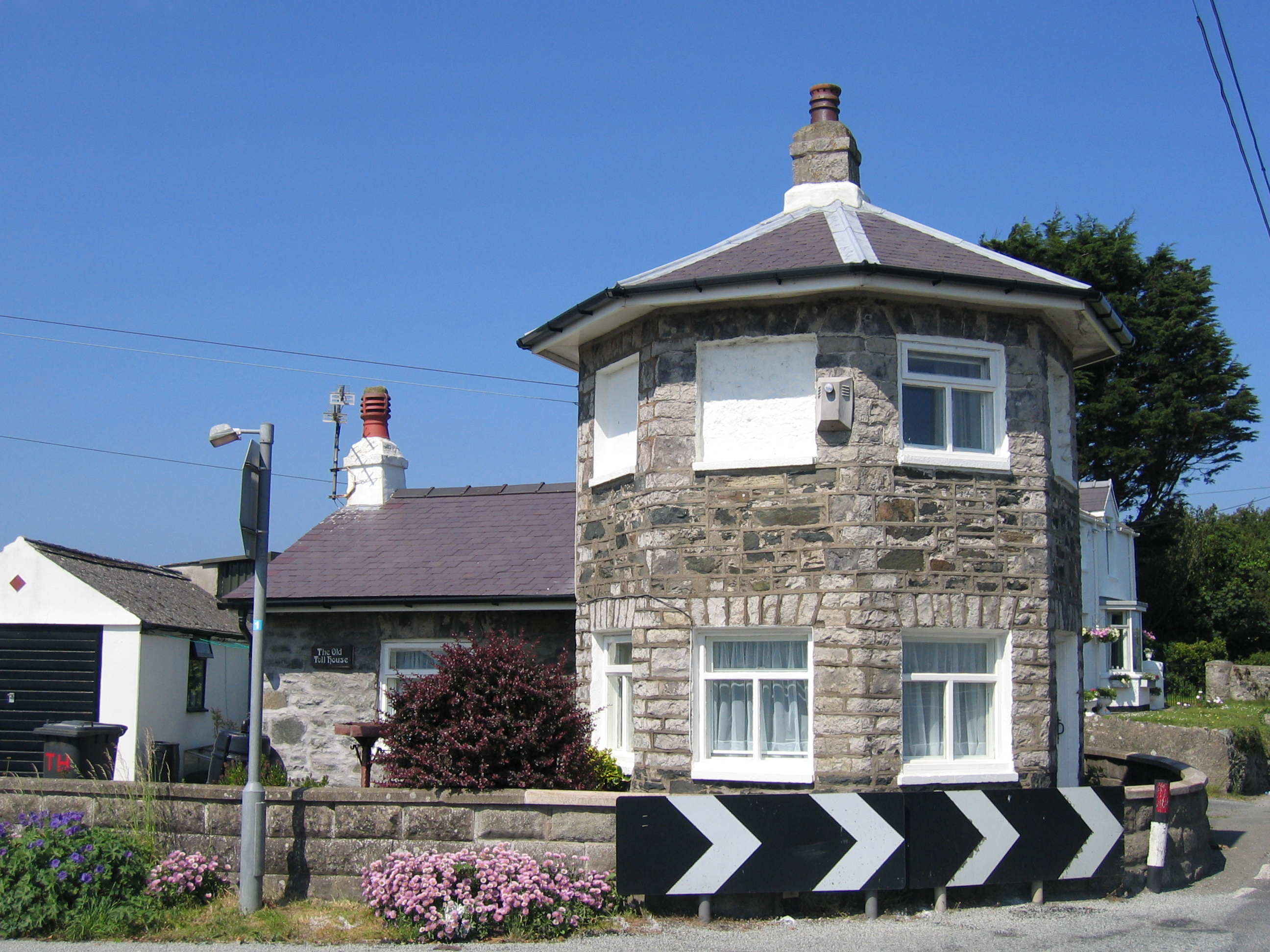
Caergeiliog Toll House by the A5 on Anglesey

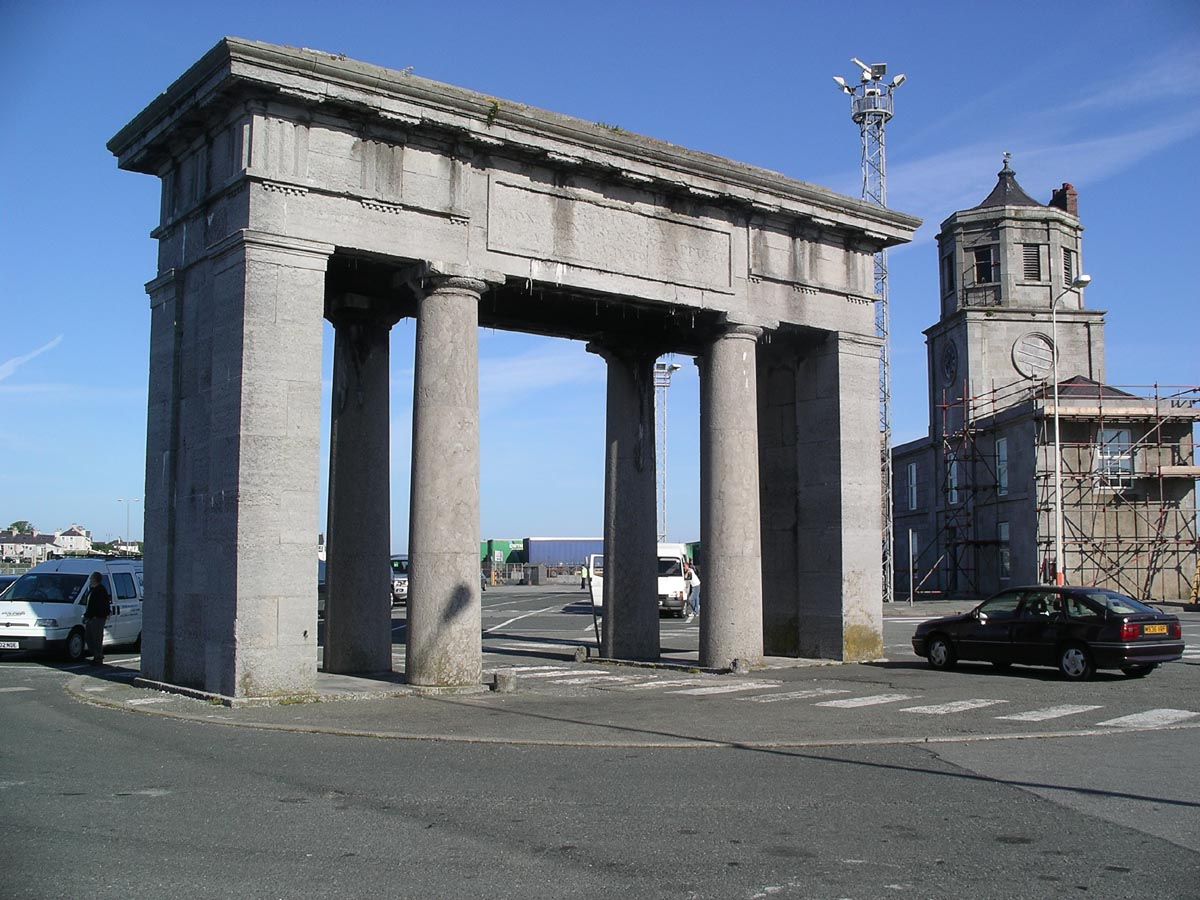
Admiralty Arch, Holyhead – end of the A5

== See also ==
- A5 road (Isle of Man)
- A5 road (Northern Ireland)
- Trunk roads in Wales
