= Rainsbrook Secure Training Centre =

Coordinates: 52.3274°N 1.2445°W

Rainsbrook Secure Training Centre is a secure school and housing unit for children and teenagers between Dunchurch and Barby, south of Rugby, in Warwickshire, England. It is next to HM Prison Onley and HM Prison Rye Hill. While designed for a capacity of 87 inmates, it currently houses around 65, a mixture of girls and boys of various ages. It is currently run by the UK subsidiary of American private prison firm MTC.

On 19 April 2004 a 15-year-old boy, Gareth Myatt, died while being restrained by guards at the centre, which at the time was run by G4S.

Rainsbrook has been criticised for having high levels of violence between inmates and towards staff, with 587 assaults in the 6 months leading up to October 2018. Plans to reduce violence were introduced in 2017, and reportedly led to large reductions in the number of incidents.

Conditions in Rainsbrook were criticised by Amanda Spielman, Her Majesty's Chief Inspector for Ofsted, in a letter to Lord Chancellor and Secretary of State for Justice Rt Hon Robert Buckland QC, published on 16 December 2020. Incidents listed included:

- 15-year-olds arriving at the centre were being locked in their rooms for 14 days of coronavirus quarantine and only being allowed out for 30 minutes per day. Children are supposed to have four hours per day out of their rooms.
- One boy was placed on an ‘incorrect management plan’ in the Reverse Cohort Unit (used to allow self-isolation) due to miscommunications about his medical vulnerabilities. Between 26 November 2020 and 10 December 2020 this child had a total of only four hours out of his room.
- According to DoE and DfE rules, children should complete three hours education each day in their rooms. Education work packs were issued, and children were supposed to use an electronic tablet to upload their work. Record keeping was deemed to be poor, and there was no evidence that children's education entitlement was being met.

Many of these problems had already been flagged by an inspection from Ofsted, Her Majesty's Inspectorate of Prisons (HMIP) and the Care Quality Commission (CQC), which took place between 26 and 29 October 2020, and while action was taken, it has been deemed of an inadequate level by Ofsted and the CQC.

Justice Minister Lucy Frazer commented, saying:

"These findings are incredibly concerning and disappointing, particularly as MTC gave repeated assurances that they would act on previous warnings."

MTC answered, stating:

"Following Ofsted's initial recommendations, we immediately installed new leadership and implemented measures to improve and strengthen governance and management oversight at the centre. We recognise there is more work to do to improve the centre and we do accept more should have been done during this challenging period."
