= Onley (lost settlement) =

- Former village
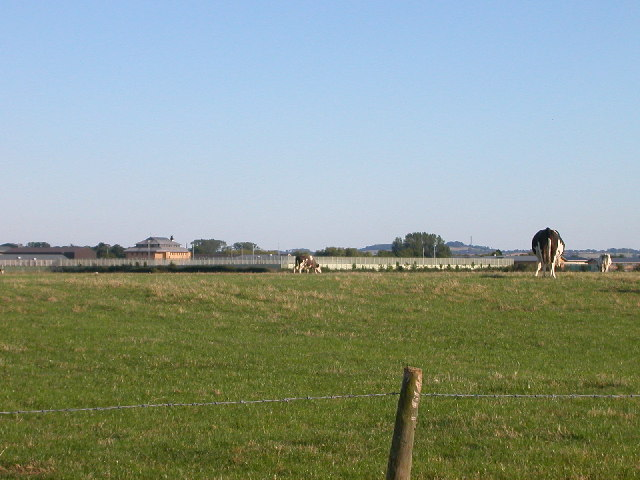
- Open farmland where once stood the village of Onley

- Onley within Northamptonshire
- Coordinates: 52°19′30″N 1°15′30″W
- Country: England
- District: West Northamptonshire
- Civil Parish: Barby

Population (2021)
  - Total: 1,668 (institutional)
- Map Ref: SP511707

Onley is a deserted medieval village in Northamptonshire, England, forming a small salient along the border with Warwickshire. Onley lies within the parish of Barby. The site is bordered on the north by the M45 motorway. On the east are HMP Onley and Rye Hill, which make up most of Onley's modern population, and on the south-west is the A45 road. The Oxford Canal and the disused trackbed of the Great Central Railway run close to the eastern boundary.

== History ==
Onley was presumed to be included under entries for Barby in taxation records before 1272.

The first known mention of Onley is in 1272, when it was recorded as being in the possession of George de Cantelupe along with the manor of Barby. The entry records that "Virgates in villeinage are valued at 9 shilling per annum".

Records in 1345 mention ‘Tenements in Onle’, which may imply that at that time the village was still viable.

There is no further record of Onley until the early part of the 18th century, when the village was described as only a hamlet of seven shepherds' houses, which implies that the site had become pasture land for sheep.

Records of 1841 show that 19 people lived on the site of Onley in five scattered farms which still exist on the land.

== Remains ==
The earthwork remains lie either side of a stream that runs from south to west across the site with the north-eastern end of the stream now in a culvert. The whole area of the village site covers 28 hectares with much of the earthworks well preserved. There is some difficulty in interpreting some of the earthworks due to the site being over ploughed in narrow ridge and furrow which has smoothed and flattened some of the earthworks of the village. The features of this site combine to make Onley lost village one of the most important sites of this kind in the country, despite the lack of documentation.
