= HM Prison Onley =

Prison named after the lost village of Onley

Coordinates: 52°19′41″N 1°14′49″W

HMP Onley
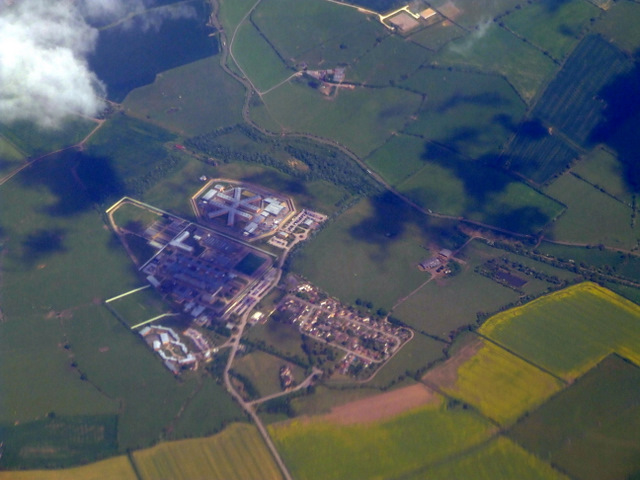
- HMP Onley (bottom) and HMP Rye Hill (top) from the air
- Interactive map of HMP Onley
- Location: Barby, Northamptonshire
- Security class: Adult Male/Category C
- Population: 710 (June 2009)
- Opened: 1968
- Managed by: HM Prison Services
- Governor: Matthew Tilt
- Website: Onley at justice.gov.uk

HM Prison Onley is a Category C men's prison, operated by His Majesty's Prison Service. The prison is named after the lost village of Onley, which is located next to the prison.

Onley Prison is in the county of Northamptonshire close to its border with Warwickshire in England. The prison is in the parish of Barby in Northamptonshire. However the postal address of the prison is Willoughby, Warwickshire, therefore most sources list the prison as in Willoughby, Warwickshire. It is next to HMP Rye Hill and Rainsbrook Secure Training Centre south of Rugby.

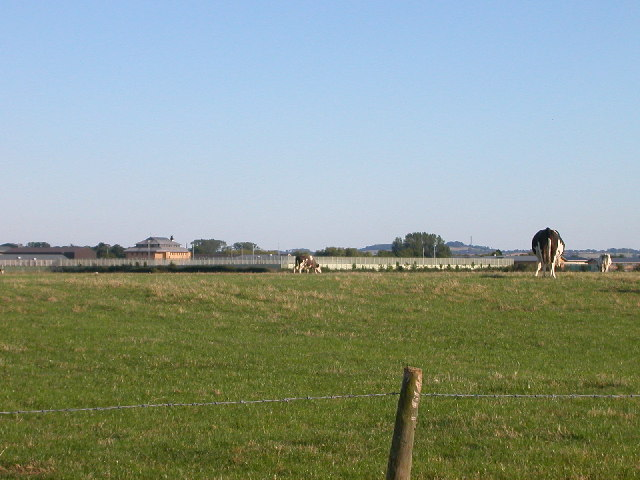
HMP Onley perimeter fence

== History ==
Onley opened as a Borstal in 1968, and became a Young Offenders Institution in 1976. The prison gradually increased in size as new accommodation was added. Its role was expanded in 1998 when juveniles were taken for the first time and for three years from 2001 remanded as well as sentenced juveniles were held in addition to a Young Offender population. During this period there was considerable investment in buildings and staffing to meet Youth Justice Board standards.

A refurbishment programme commenced at the prison in 2002 and finished in 2006. In 2003 the Youth Justice Board made the decision to remove the juvenile population from Onley. These were replaced by sentenced adults in March 2004, making Onley a prison for adults and Young Offenders.

In 2004, Onley Prison was identified as the most violent Young Offenders Institution in England and Wales, according to the Prison Reform Trust. The trust pointed to high rates of violence between inmates and frequent attacks on the staff at the prison.

In September 2007, two inmates escaped from Onley Prison by scaling a fence with a homemade ladder. It was believed that the pair then escaped in a getaway vehicle that had been waiting outside the prison for them. The escaped prisoners were subsequently recaptured six weeks later.

A new wing was constructed at the prison in 2009, and in 2010 Onley became an adult only establishment, with all remaining young offenders transferred to other prisons.

In July 2011, it was announced that Onley along with several other publicly operated prisons, would be market tested, allowing private operators as well as HM Prison service, to tender for the contract to operate the prison. Onley was removed from the bid in October 2012.

== The prison today ==
Onley is a Category C prison for adult males. All residential wings (apart from I Wing, J & K Wing & L Wing) have 60 single cells each with internal sanitation, in-cell electricity and TV. There are showering facilities, association and dining areas and a laundry room with industrial type washing machines and dryers. H Wing is an induction wing for new prisoners. I Wing holds 100 prisoners in 50 double cells, while L wing has 6 double cells and 58 single cells. Both have internal sanitation and comparable facilities to other wings.

Education for inmates at the prison may be followed on a full or part-time basis, depending on the needs of the prisoner. Onley also offers training places in a range of industries and activities.

== Notable former inmates ==
- Alun Kyte (as of May 2023)
- Tommy Robinson
- Ashley Walters
