= Barby Nortoft =

Coordinates: 52.3496°N 1.1852°W

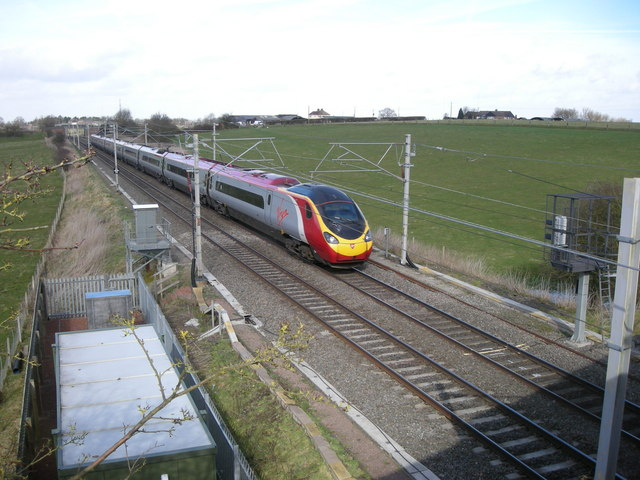
- The West Coast Main Line at Barby Nortoft

- Location within Northamptonshire
- OS grid reference: SP556727
- Civil parish: Barby
- Unitary authority: West Northamptonshire
- Ceremonial county: Northamptonshire
- Region: East Midlands
- Country: England
- Sovereign state: United Kingdom
- Post town: Rugby
- Postcode district: CV23
- Dialling code: 01788
- Police: Northamptonshire
- Fire: Northamptonshire
- Ambulance: East Midlands
- UK Parliament: Daventry

Barby Nortoft is a settlement in the civil parish of Barby, in the English county of Northamptonshire. It is south-east of the town of Rugby, Warwickshire. The population of the settlement is included in the civil parish of Kilsby. The West Coast Main Line passes through the area, making it popular with railway photographers.

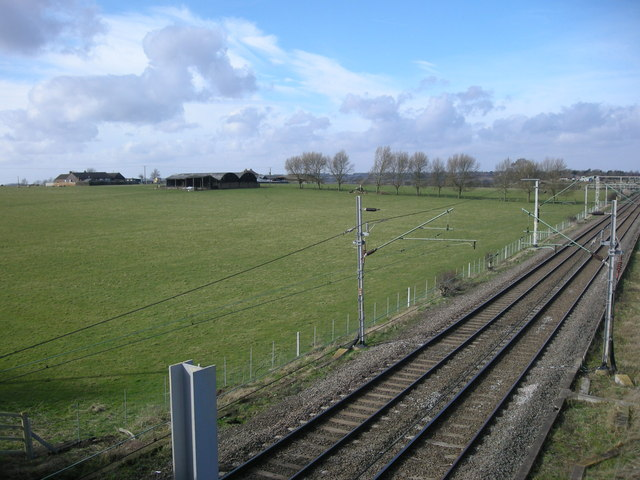
Barby Nortoft Farm in March 2009
