= Great Brickhill =

Village in Buckinghamshire, England

Coordinates: 51.965°N 0.684°W

- Location within Buckinghamshire
- Interactive map of Great Brickhill
- Population: 817 (2011 Census)
- OS grid reference: SP905305
- Civil parish: Great Brickhill
- Unitary authority: Buckinghamshire
- Ceremonial county: Buckinghamshire
- Region: South East
- Country: England
- Sovereign state: United Kingdom
- Post town: MILTON KEYNES
- Postcode district: MK17
- Dialling code: 01525
- Police: Thames Valley
- Fire: Buckinghamshire
- Ambulance: South Central
- UK Parliament: Buckingham and Bletchley
- Website: Great Brickhill Parish Council

Great Brickhill is a village and civil parish in the unitary authority area of Buckinghamshire, England. It is on the border with the City of Milton Keynes, located 6 miles (9.7 km) south-east of Central Milton Keynes, and 3 miles (4.8 km) in the same direction from Fenny Stratford.

== History ==
The village name is a compound of Brythonic and Anglo Saxon origins, which is a common occurrence in this part of the country. The Brythonic breg means 'hill', and the Anglo Saxon hyll also means 'hill'. In the Domesday Book of 1086 the village was recorded as Brichelle. The affix 'Great' was added in the 12th century to differentiate from nearby Bow Brickhill and Little Brickhill.

Robert Merydale was parson of the parish church of Great Brickhill in 1470, according to a legal record, in which Edward Lucy & Thomas Hampden claim that he owed them £20.

Great Brickhill was described in 1806 in Magna Britannia as follows:

Great-Brickhill, in the hundred and deanery of Newport, lies about two miles and a half to the south-east of Fenny Stratford. The manor was anciently in the Beauchamps, from whom it passed by female heirs to the Bassets and Greys. Richard Grey, Earl of Kent, sold it in 1514 to Sir Charles Somerset, of whose son, Sir George it was purchased in 1549, by the Duncombes: from this family it passed, by female heirs, to the Bartons and Paunceforts, and is now the property of Philip Duncombe Pauncefort esq.
The manor of Smewnes-Grange, in this parish, became the property of Woburn Abbey, in 1293. King Edward VI granted it to Edward Stanton esq. of whose descendant it was purchased in 1792, (under an act of parliament which had passed the preceding year,) by the present proprietor, Edward Hanmer esq. of Stockgrove. This manor extends into the parish of Soulbury: the manor-house, which was built by Edward Stanton, the grantee, within a moated site near the River Ouzel, has long been suffered to go to decay.
In the parish church are memorials of the families of Duncombe, Barton, Pauncefort, and Chase. The advowson of the rectory is annexed to the manor. This parish was inclosed by an act of parliament, passed in 1776, when an allotment of land was assigned to the rector, in lieu of tithes, and an allotment to the poor in lieu of their right of cutting furze.

The Victoria History of the Counties of England provides substantially more detail on the manorial record, but does not mention the Beauchamps (apart from one mention of 'the wife of the Earl of Warwick').

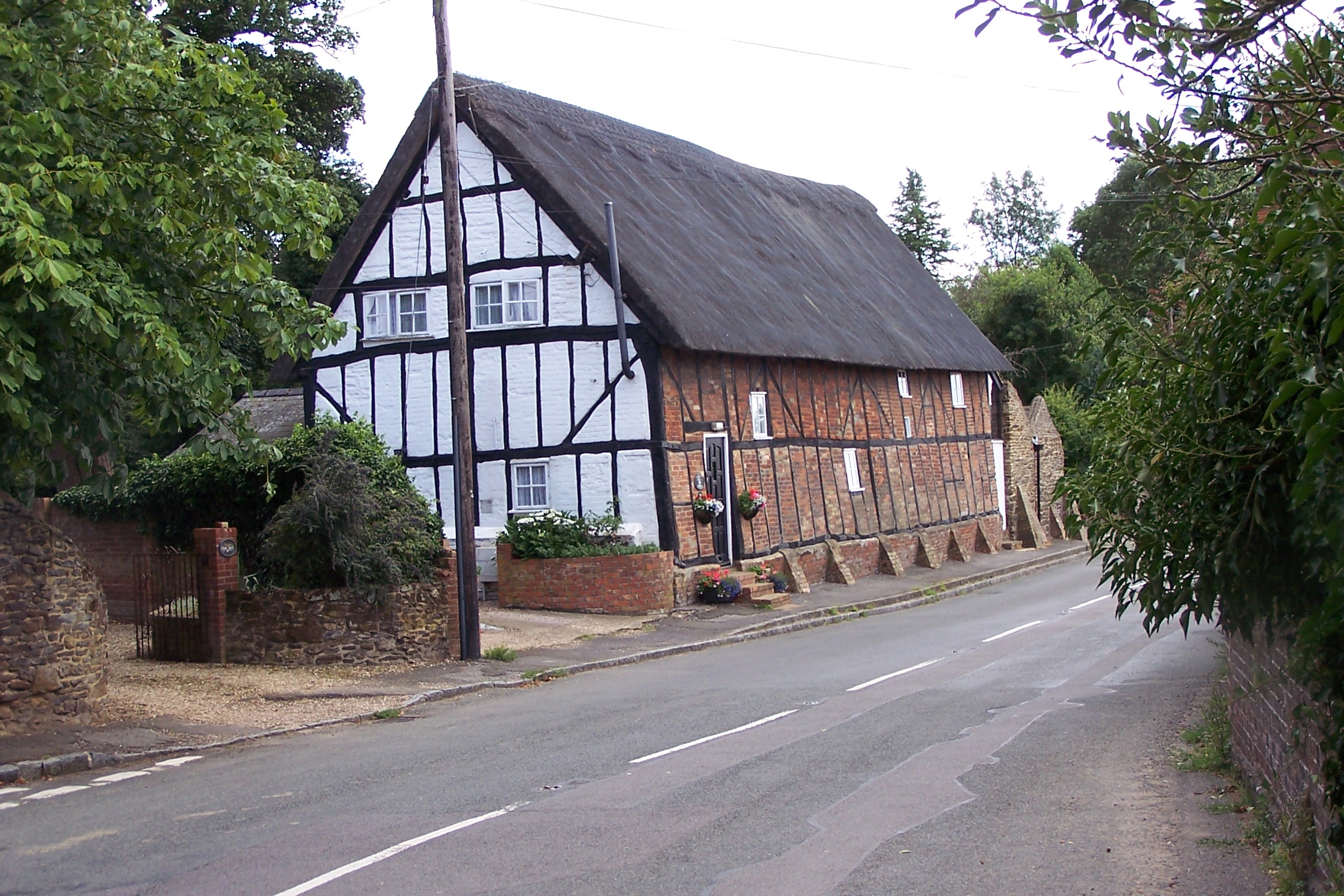
"Cromwell's Cottages" where Essex's men were reputedly billeted

In 1643 Great Brickhill was touched by the English Civil War. The Parliamentarian Earl of Essex and his army camped in the village for a month. Great Brickhill was considered a strategic site due to its elevation and proximity to Watling Street (now the A5 road), at the time the main approach road to London from the north. However, there were no battles or even skirmishes here.

== Modern Great Brickhill ==
That Great Brickhill survives today as a village is due in no small part to the objections of its residents to the ever-increasing development of Milton Keynes. The expansion of this large urban area has led to parts of the civil parish being swallowed up.

The high brick wall, reminiscent of that at nearby Woburn, which runs for some distance adjacent to the road, now neglected and ruined in places, surrounds the 70-acre (280,000 m^{2}) park which once housed the principal seat of the Duncombe family, Great Brickhill Manor. The last manor house to occupy this park was built circa 1835, a large square brick stuccoed building of no particular architectural merit – old photographs show a slight Italianate influence in the design, a style later made popular by Queen Victoria at Osborne House. This house was demolished in 1937 after serving for a time as Stratton Park Preparatory School.

The Duncombe family (the head of whom since 1859 has been a Baronet) continue to live in the village and own the estate; however, they now reside at what used to be the old Rectory near the church. Ironically the rectory is shielded from the empty site of the family's former more splendid home by a battlemented folly wall, built by a former Duncombe who disliked the vicar so much that he did not wish to see him or his home!

The parish church of St. Mary the Virgin is a Grade II* listed building, dating back to the 13th century.

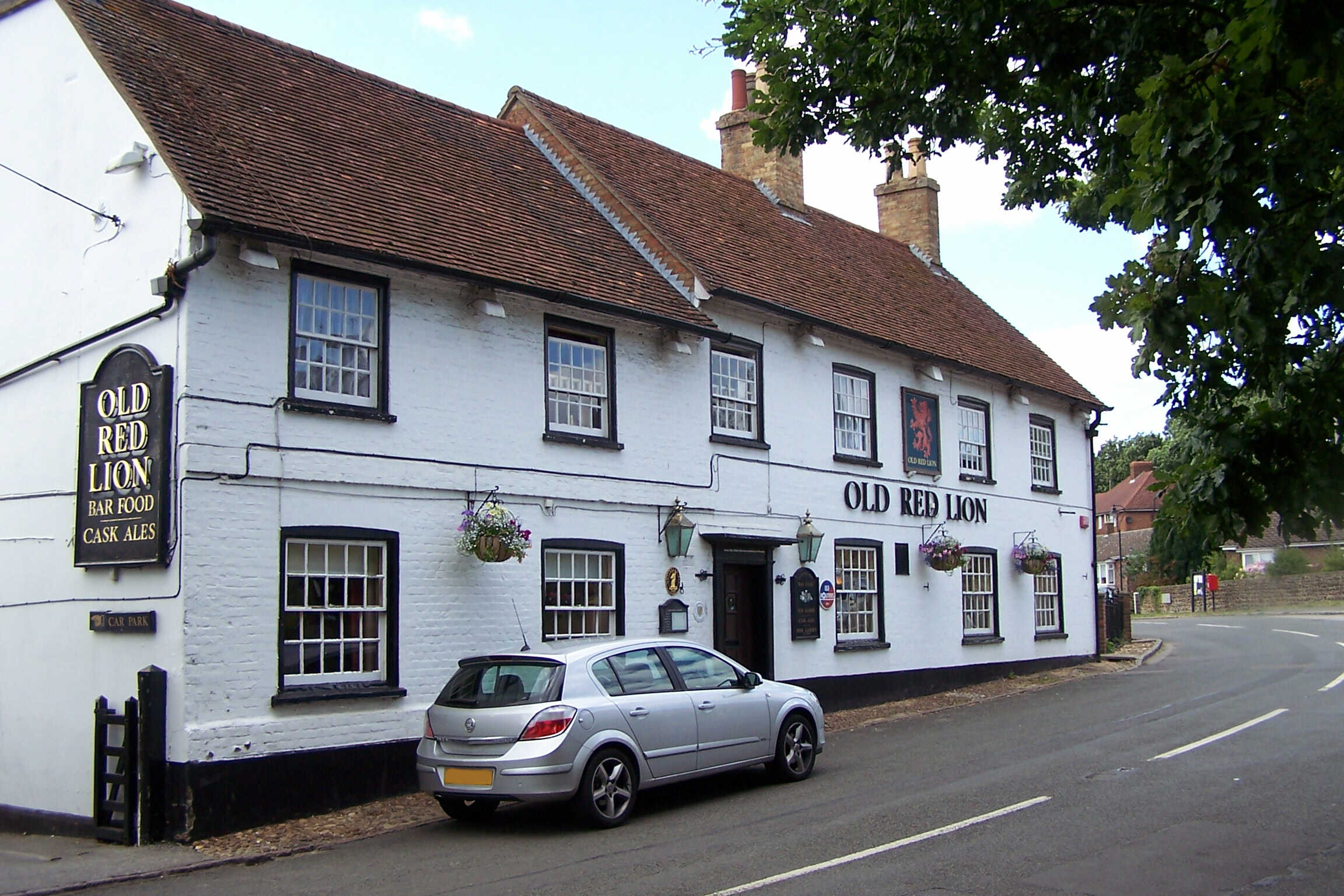
The Old Red Lion

Another large house in the area was Stockgrove, built in the 1920s on the site of a much older mansion (see Magna Britannia above) this Georgian-style house was built by the industrialist Sir Ferdinand Kroyer-Kielberg. The estate was divided and sold in the 1950s. The house for a time became a 'Special School' and in the 1990s was divided into luxury apartments.

Great Brickhill no longer has a shop or post office. It has a local public house, the 'Old Red Lion'.

The village primary school is High Ash Church of England Combined School, which is a mixed, voluntary controlled school. It takes children from the ages of four to eleven and has approximately 270 pupils.

== See also ==
- Bow Brickhill – Civil parish in the City of Milton Keynes, England
- Little Brickhill – Village in Buckinghamshire, England
