= Druid, Denbighshire =

Village in Denbighshire, Wales

Coordinates: 52°58′50″N 3°25′50″W

Druid
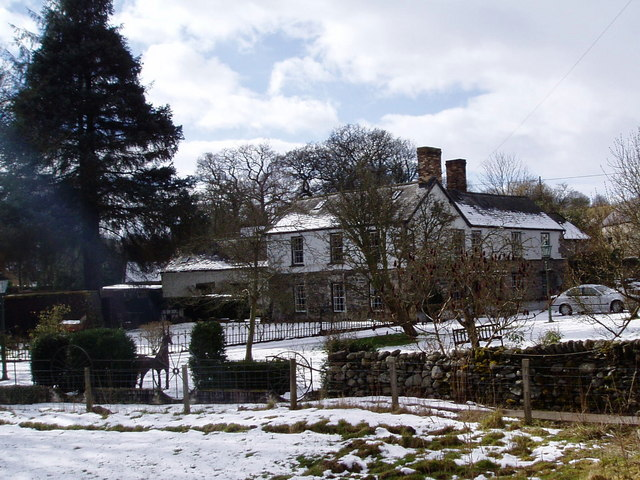
- The Druid Inn at Druid

- Location within Denbighshire
- OS grid reference: SJ 0405 4353
- Community: Corwen
- Principal area: Denbighshire
- Preserved county: Clwyd
- Country: Wales
- Sovereign state: United Kingdom
- Post town: Corwen
- Postcode district: LL21
- Dialling code: 01490
- Police: North Wales
- Fire: North Wales
- Ambulance: Welsh
- UK Parliament: Dwyfor Meirionnydd
- Senedd Cymru – Welsh Parliament: Clwyd South

Druid (Welsh: Y Ddwyryd) is a small village in Denbighshire, Wales. The village is located where the A5 and the A494 meet, about two miles west of Corwen and near the boundary with Gwynedd.

The name is an anglicisation of the Welsh name Y Ddwyryd (lit. 'the Two Fords') from its position nearby two fords, one on the River Ceirw, which runs into the River Dee lower down the valley, and the other on a small stream flowing into that river. It has no connection to Druidic history or folk lore.

The village is home to a Grade II Listed Building, The Druids. Originally a farmhouse, the building was later used as an inn, a butchers shop, and a smithy. The building has been refurbished extensively in 1850 and 1950.
