= Little Brickhill =

Village in Buckinghamshire, England

Coordinates: 51.983°N 0.677°W

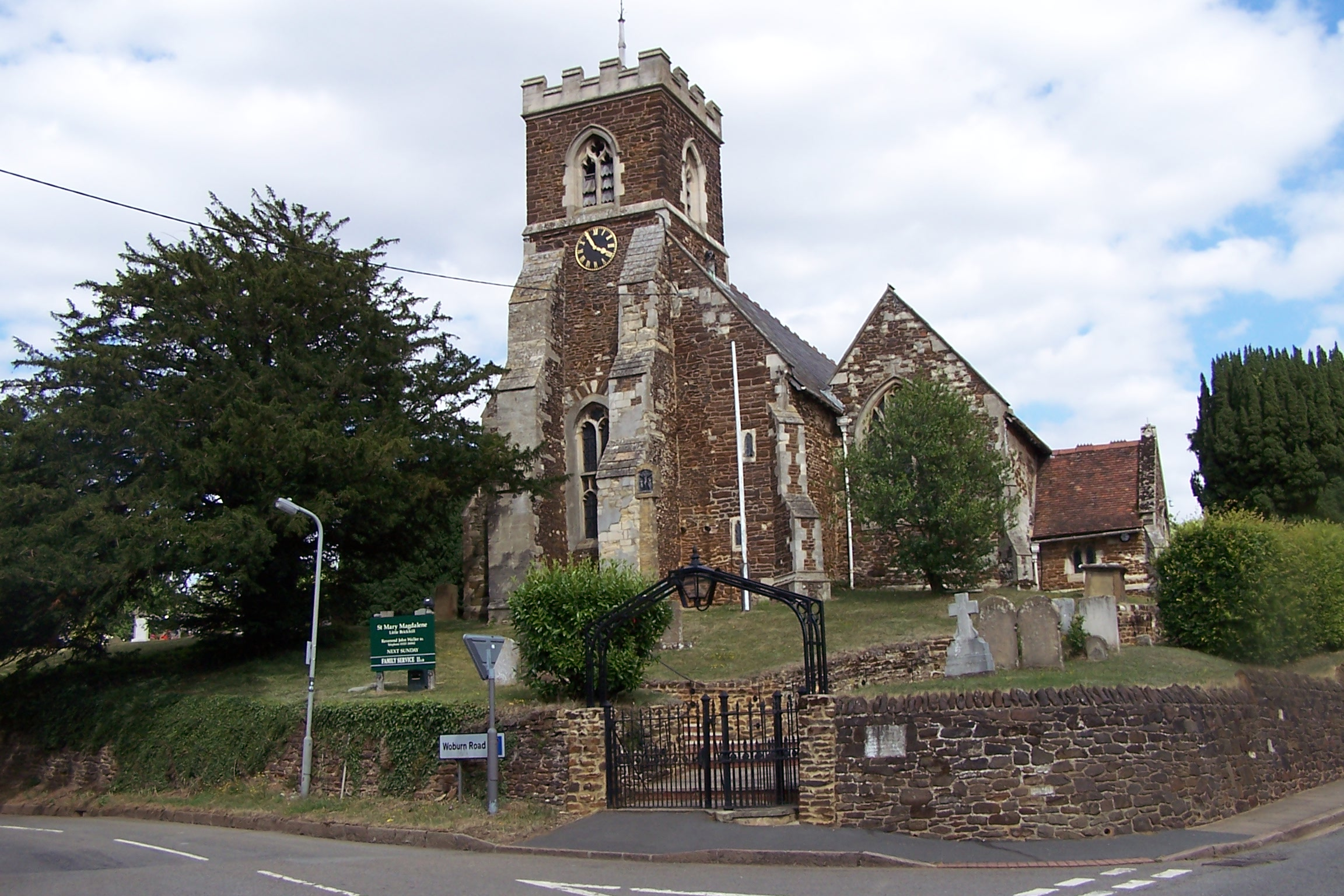
- The parish church

- Location within Buckinghamshire
- Interactive map of Little Brickhill
- Population: 444 (2021 census)
- OS grid reference: SP909324
- Civil parish: Little Brickhill
- District: City of Milton Keynes
- Unitary authority: Milton Keynes City Council
- Ceremonial county: Buckinghamshire
- Region: South East
- Country: England
- Sovereign state: United Kingdom
- Post town: MILTON KEYNES
- Postcode district: MK17
- Dialling code: 01525
- Police: Thames Valley
- Fire: Buckinghamshire
- Ambulance: South Central
- UK Parliament: Milton Keynes Central

Little Brickhill is a village and civil parish in the unitary authority area of the City of Milton Keynes, Buckinghamshire, England. Located immediately to the west of the A5, it is just outside and overlooking the Milton Keynes urban area, about 5 miles (8.0 km) south-east of Central Milton Keynes, 2 miles (3.2 km) south-east of Fenny Stratford, and 2.5 miles (4.0 km) south-east of Woburn, Bedfordshire. At the 2021 census, it had a population of 444.

== History ==
The village name "Brickhill" is a compound of Brythonic and Old English words that have the same meaning: a common occurrence in this part of the country. The Brythonic word breg means "hill", as does the Old English word hyll. In the Domesday Book of 1086 the village was referred to as Brichelle. This spelling also occurs in 1422, denoting the place where John Langon was the vicar.

The village has, for a long time, gathered most of its income from the Roman road Watling Street that passes through the parish from north-west to south-east, and anciently from a fair that was established in the village in 1228. At one time the county Assize Courts were held in Little Brickhill, making it adversely larger than nearby Great Brickhill. The last time the assizes were heard here was in 1638. Between 1561 and 1620 the names of a number of executed criminals appear in the burial register of the village. The village, being located on a major route to London, was a staging post for mail and passenger stagecoaches. "The Clockhouse" (now converted for residential use) housed just such a staging post, incorporating a stable, office, coach sheds, a hotel and a cowshed. Upon entering the courtyard, grooves can be seen in the cobble stones under the arch that were made by the wheels of countless coaches coming and going.

== Churches ==
There are two churches in the parish, one in the village itself (St Mary Magdalene, the CoE parish church) and the other (All Saints, also CoE), on the hill above. St Mary Magdalene is a Grade II* listed building;

== Amenities ==
The village had two public houses, The George and The Green Man, the latter is now closed and converted to homes. The George continues as a gastro pub. The post office that was housed in the village shop closed in 2008 which precipitated the closure of the shop itself.

== Notable residents ==
- Mark Frank (1612–1664), college head and theologian.
- Doreen E Adcock (1936–2020), who received the BEM for services to swimming having taught over 13,000 children in the Milton Keynes area to swim. She was also the winner of the BBC sports personality of the year unsung hero award, 2009. Doreen has a plaque on a bench in the village and also has a pillar in the Milton Keynes Rose ( https://miltonkeynesrose.org.uk/) dedicated to her achievements.
- John Motson (1945–2023), the BBC football commentator.

== See also ==
- Great Brickhill
- Bow Brickhill
