= HM Prison Rye Hill =

Prison in Northamptonshire, England

Coordinates: 52.3283°N 1.2426°W

HMP Rye Hill
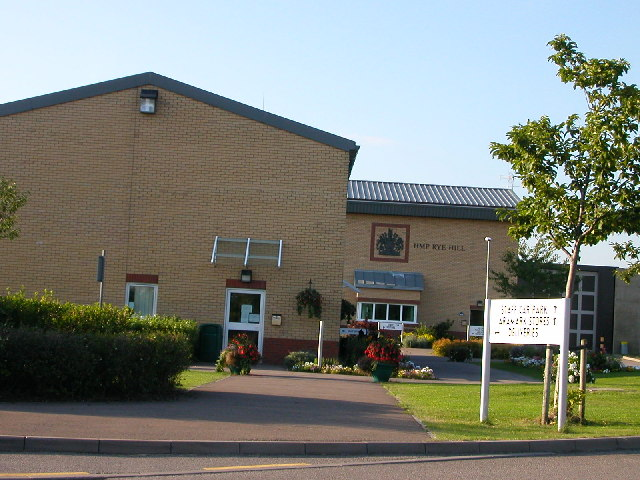
- Interactive map of HMP Rye Hill
- Location: Onley, Northamptonshire
- Status: Operational
- Security class: Category C/Adult Males
- Capacity: 1100(March 2026)
- Opened: 2001
- Managed by: G4S
- Director: Lee Davies

HM Prison Rye Hill is a Category C men's private prison, operated by G4S. Rye Hill has exclusively housed sex offenders since 2014. The prison is next to HMP Onley and Rainsbrook Secure Training Centre, south of Rugby, in the parish of Barby, Northamptonshire, England. However, the postal address of the prison is Willoughby, Warwickshire; therefore, most sources list the prison as in Willoughby, Warwickshire.

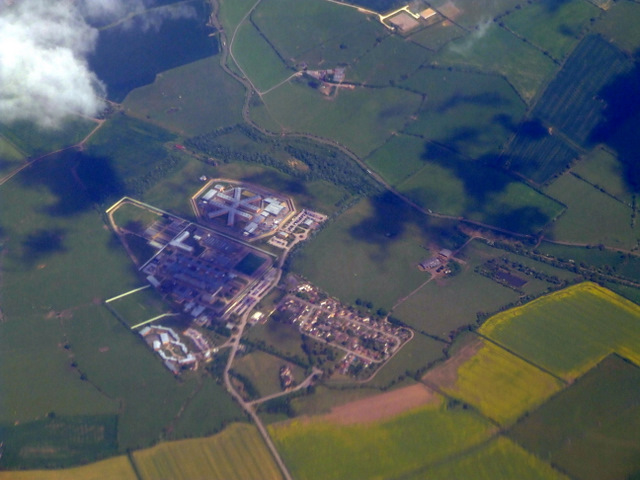
Aerial photograph of HMP Rye Hill (top) and HMP Onley (bottom)

== History ==
Rye Hill Prison, which was built by Carillion opened in early 2001, and has since been operated by G4S under the Private Finance Initiative.

In March 2002, two inmates serving 10-year sentences escaped from Rye Hill by hiding in the back of a delivery lorry.

In April 2004, Member of Parliament Andrew Rosindell responded to the escape of a convicted murderer by calling for a review of security. At the time of his escape, the prisoner had been at University Hospital Coventry receiving a blood transfusion.

In July 2005, an inspection report from Her Majesty's Chief Inspector of Prisons demanded urgent action after finding that the prisoners were bullying the staff. According to the report, inexperienced officers were deliberately overlooking behavioral violations and contraband items for their own safety. Some inmates reported that knives, drugs and alcohol were readily available at the prison. In 2014 under the stewardship of David Thompson OBE the prison was re-roled as a Category B sex-offender prison.

== The prison today ==
Rye Hill is a Category B prison holding adult males convicted of sexual offences.

Education at the prison is contracted to The Manchester College. Courses and evening classes are offered 5 days a week, 50 weeks a year. Commercial contracts such as welding, electronic assembly and hairnet production are operated from within two workshops.

== Notable former inmates ==
- Alun Kyte, before moving to HM Prison Onley
