= Kilsby =

Village in Northamptonshire, England

Coordinates: 52.336061°N 1.17435°W

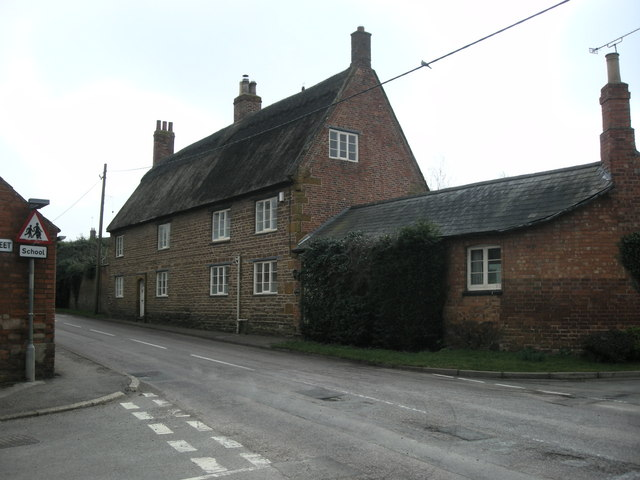
- Kilsby Main Road

- Location within Northamptonshire
- Population: 1,268 (2020 est)
- OS grid reference: SP562712
- Civil parish: Kilsby
- Unitary authority: West Northamptonshire
- Ceremonial county: Northamptonshire
- Region: East Midlands
- Country: England
- Sovereign state: United Kingdom
- Post town: RUGBY
- Postcode district: CV23
- Dialling code: 01788
- Police: Northamptonshire
- Fire: Northamptonshire
- Ambulance: East Midlands
- UK Parliament: Daventry

Kilsby is a village and civil parish in the West Northamptonshire unitary authority area of Northamptonshire, England. It is situated a short distance south of the border with Warwickshire, approximately 5 miles (8 km) southeast of Rugby. The parish of Kilsby, which includes Barby Nortoft, was estimated to have a population of 1,268 in 2020.

== History ==
Kilsby's name comes from Anglo-Saxon cildes + old Norse býr, literally meaning "child's dwelling", but "child" here probably means "young nobleman". Its church, St Faith's, may originally have been the daughter chapel of the neighbouring parish of Barby.

The parish's eastern side is bounded by the old route of the Roman Watling Street, and the village itself is sited on the crossing of two former mediaeval drove-routes.

One of the earliest armed confrontations of the English Civil War took place at Kilsby in August 1642: The Royalist Captain Sir John Smith led a group of soldiers to disarm the villagers, after the news was heard that they were Parliamentarian supporters. The villagers put up resistance, and in the ensuing fight, several villagers were killed.

Kilsby gives its name to the Kilsby Tunnel; a railway tunnel on the West Coast Main Line. The construction of the tunnel between 1835 and 1838 caused considerable disruption to the village, as more than 1,200 navvies lived in a shanty town on the edge of the village, using 200 horses and thirteen steam engines to construct it. The navvies were known for their heavy drinking in the local inns, and on one occasion, troops from the nearby Weedon barracks were called in to quell a riot. The tunnel measures 1 mile 666 yards (2,216 m).

"Kilsby Jones" is the name by which James Rhys Jones is usually known. He was a Welsh congregationalist minister and writer in Kilsby from 1840 to about 1850, when he moved to Birmingham.

The village has grown moderately since the 1960s, with a mix of new housing developments and a degree of in-filling. It retains a historic core of attractive buildings including some fine examples of Northamptonshire rubble stone construction, and a number of thatched properties. A Conservation area was designated in the village in 2018, and many of the village's more attractive properties are listed for their historic interest.

== Landmarks and amenities ==
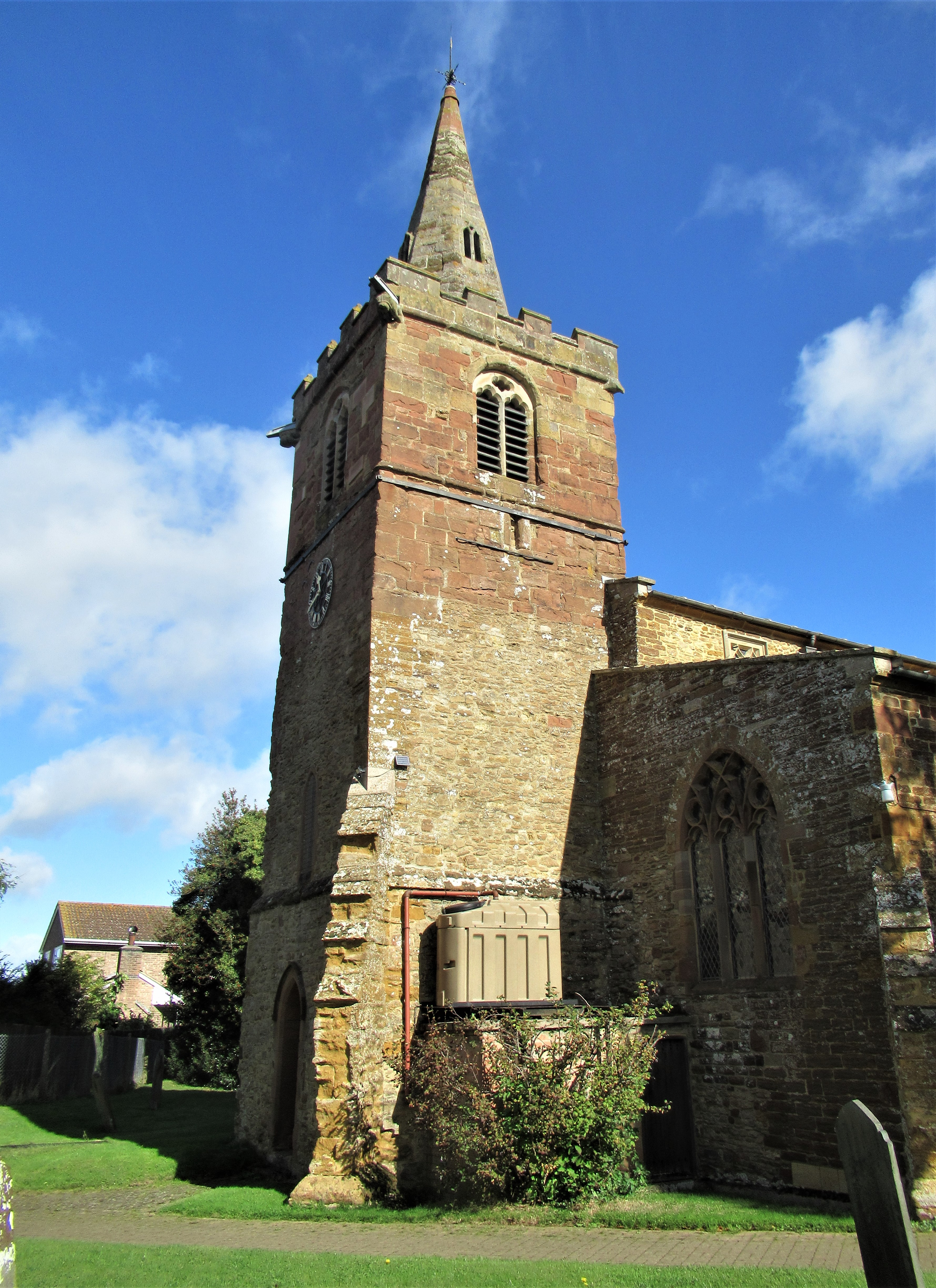
St Faith's Church, Kilsby

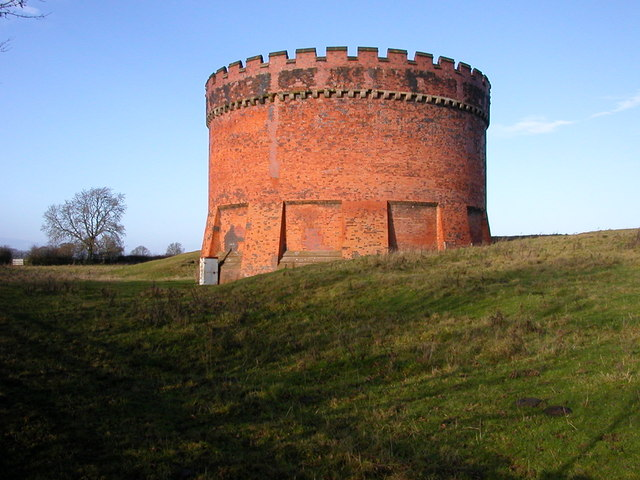
The crenelated top of one of the ventilation shafts of the Kilsby Tunnel, visible from the A5 road

Amenities in the village include an Ofsted "Good" rated primary school, two pubs, The Red Lion and The George and two churches - Church of England and URC.

The Village also has a volunteer-run, community-owned shop in the car park of the Red Lion pub. This warm community spirit is also evident in a number of thriving community groups, including Womans Institute, Brownies, Girl Guides, as well as a good neighbour community support scheme born out of the 2020 COVID-19 lockdown and the Kilsby Kronicle village newspaper.

The two 1830s ventilation shafts of the Kilsby Tunnel designed by Robert Stephenson are topped with circular crenelated turrets. These structures, visible from the A5 road, are listed buildings.

== Transport ==
The village is circa 10 minutes from both Long Buckby and Rugby stations, the latter offering direct services into London Euston in 49 minutes. Between 1881 and 1960, the village used to have a railway station Kilsby and Crick station but this was on the Northampton Loop about a mile (1.5 km) from the village.

One of the village's more unusual claims to fame is that the A361 road terminates here at a junction with the A5. The A361 runs to Ilfracombe in Devon making it the longest 'three-digit' road in Britain. A consequence of these roads is that the majority of through traffic bypasses the heart of the village ensuring the main road through the village is relatively quiet.

== Notable residents ==
Frank Whittle briefly lived at 'Laurelcroft', 1 North Street, until 1949.
