= Bow Brickhill War Memorial =

Coordinates: 52.002372°N 0.680028°W

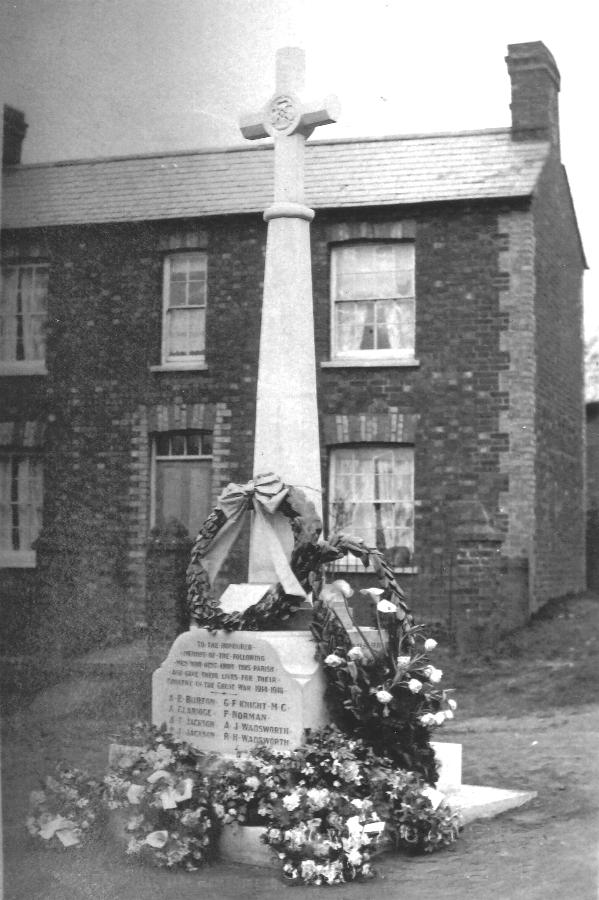
Bow Brickhill War Memorial

The Bow Brickhill War Memorial is located on the Village Green, at Church Road, Bow Brickhill, Buckinghamshire, England. It is a grade II listed building with Historic England.

== History ==
The Bow Brickhill War Memorial was erected in March 1921, during the period following the First World War, which cost the British Empire more than one million military deaths. Since the UK government did not repatriate the bodies of all soldiers who died in overseas combat, tens of thousands of war memorials were erected in the UK so that communities could memorialize those who served and returned and those who died.

The memorial was officially unveiled by the dedicated on 26 March 1921 by the 12th Duke of Bedford. In 1947, names of locals who died in the Second World War were added. In 1968, the memorial was damaged; donations were collected for repairs.

The memorial was re-dedicated on Remembrance Day 1988 and in 2016, two new names were added, both casualties of the First World War.

== Description ==
The Bow Brickhill War Memorial is a freestanding monument made of Portland stone and features 66 names inscribed and infilled with black. The monument takes the form of an octagonal shaft surmounted by a stone critself mountedunted on a two-stepped square base surmounted by a square-sectioned pinth, with shaped angles.

The front face is inscribed with eight names, dedicated to the men from the civil parish of Bow Brickhill who died in the First World War (1914–1918). The other faces are inscribed with the names of men who served in the First World War and the upper step of the base has five names, men who died in the Second World War (1939–1945).

== Notable people ==
Gerald Featherstone Knight, grandson of the rector of Bow Brickhill, was a captain in the Royal Flying Corps who died of cancer on 30 October 1919, aged 25. Knight was posthumously awarded the Military Cross for his gallantry in escaping from captivity. He authored a memoir, Brother Bosch: An Airman's Escape from Germany, published in 1919.
