= All Saints' Church, Bow Brickhill =

Coordinates: 52°00′3″N 0°40′23.59″W

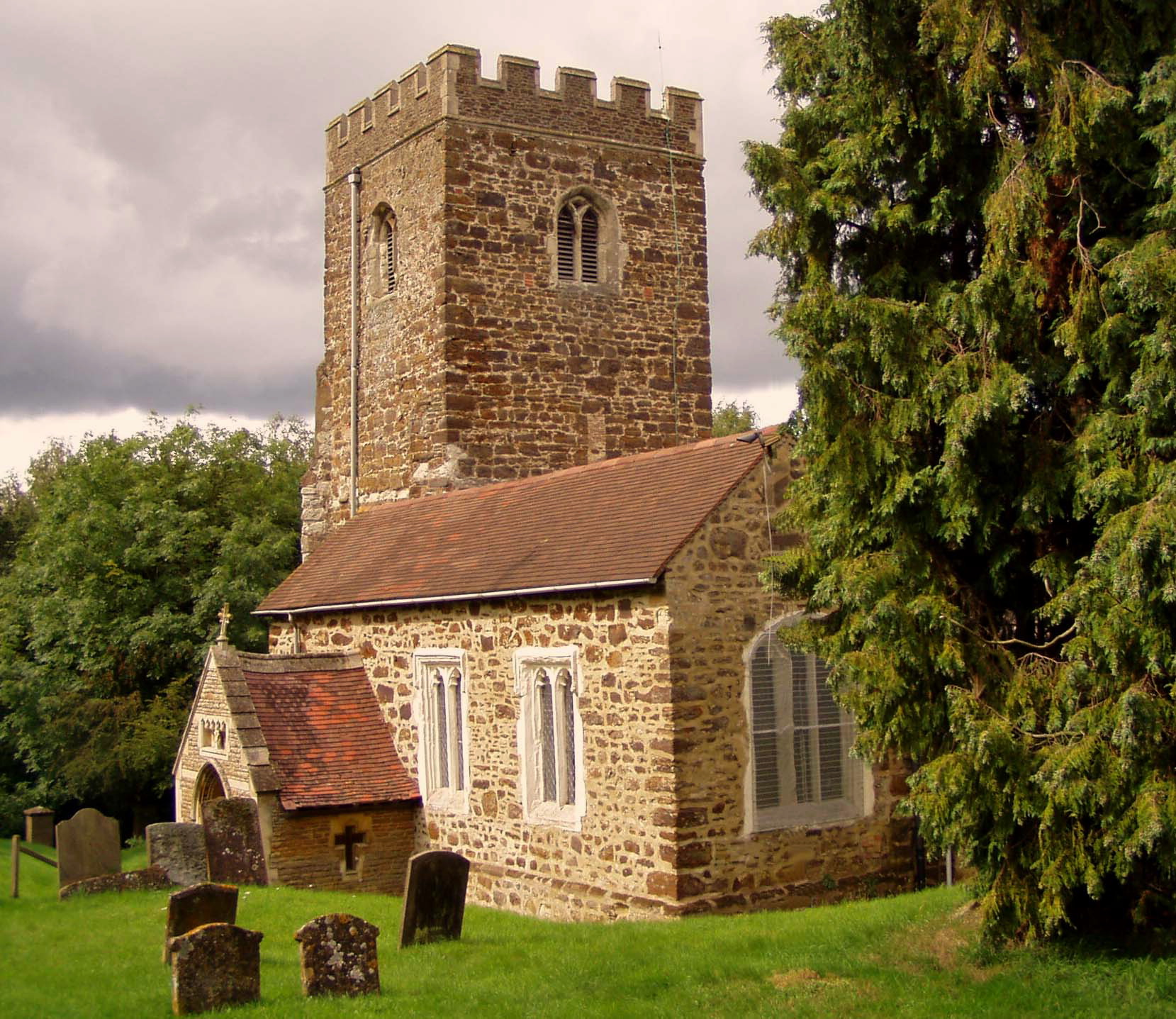
- All Saints' Church, Bow Brickhill
- All Saints' Church, Bow Brickhill
- Location: Bow Brickhill
- Country: England
- Denomination: Church of England

History
- Dedication: All Saints

Architecture
- Heritage designation: Grade II* listed

Administration
- Diocese: Diocese of Oxford
- Archdeaconry: Buckingham
- Deanery: Mursley
- Parish: Bow Brickhill

All Saints' Church, Bow Brickhill is a Grade II* listed parish church in the Church of England in Bow Brickhill, Buckinghamshire, to the south-east of Milton Keynes.

== History ==
First mentioned in 1185, a major renovation occurred in the 15th century.

Having become greatly dilapidated, the church is said to have been disused for nearly 150 years; but was restored through the munificence and exertions of Browne Willis, the antiquary, who, in 1756, promoted a subscription for that purpose. In 1834, by a re-arrangement of the interior, 175 additional sittings were obtained.

It was used during the Napoleonic Wars as a telegraph station.

== Architecture and fittings ==
The component parts are a nave with side aisles, and a south porch, a chancel, and a west embattled tower, in which are four bells. The bells are unringable as of 2023. The whole is a good specimen of Perpendicular work, without the least mixture of any other style, or the introduction of modern windows; the latter are nearly all square-headed. Three arches on each side divide the nave from the aisles. The central cross beam of the roof bears the date of 1630. There is a piscina in the south aisle. The carved oak pulpit was brought from the old church at Buckingham, upon the erection of the modern edifice. The font is octagonal in form, and on the pedestal supporting it, are four eagles displayed. The compartments are decorated with quatrefoils and foliage; and one of them has a shield with two Roman T's impaled in relievo. The chancel is plain, with open wood ceiling. Beneath the chancel arch is an oak screen. On the north side is a mural tablet of black marble to the memory of the Rev. William Watson.

== Parish status ==
The church is in a joint parish with:

- St Mary the Virgin's Church, Great Brickhill
- St Mary Magdalene's Church, Little Brickhill
- St Luke's Church, Stoke Hammond

== Organ ==
The pipe organ was installed by Kirkland but is no longer present in the church.
