= St Mary the Virgin, Great Brickhill =

St Mary the Virgin's Church, Great Brickhill
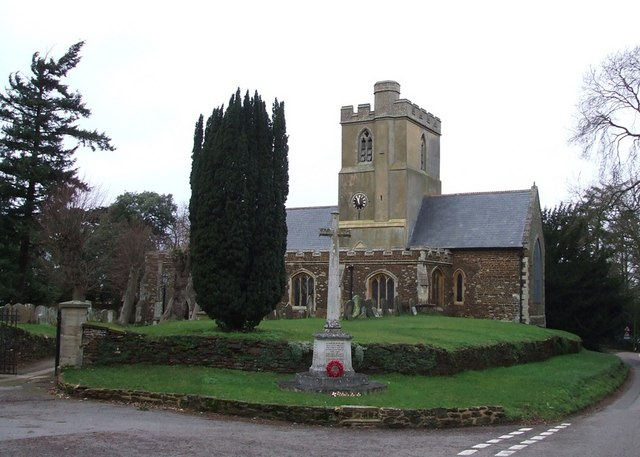
- St Mary the Virgin's Church, Great Brickhill
- St Mary the Virgin's Church, Great Brickhill
- 52°00′1.5″N 0°40′42.5″W
- OS grid reference: SP 90114 30786
- Location: Great Brickhill
- Country: England
- Denomination: Church of England

History
- Dedication: St Mary the Virgin

Architecture
- Heritage designation: Grade II* listed

Administration
- Diocese: Diocese of Oxford
- Archdeaconry: Buckingham
- Deanery: Mursley
- Parish: Great Brickhill

St Mary the Virgin's Church, Great Brickhill is a Grade II* listed parish church in the Church of England in Great Brickhill, Buckinghamshire.

== History ==
The church was built sometime in the thirteenth century, with various additions throughout the years. During 1865–67, the church underwent restoration in which a porch was added.

=== Modern Restoration ===
In 1997, a project began to "enable the church to fulfil its purposes in the 21st century." Phases I and II, the former to refurbish the church's towers and bells. Phase II was to expand the church's size by adding a meeting room, kitchen, toilets, etc. As of April 2024, all of Phase I and most of Phase II have been implemented into the church.

In 2014–2016, the church's lead roof was stolen. Due to inadequate funding, parts of the missing roof were covered in felt. In October 2023, it was reported the church faced closure if the roof was not repaired due to leakage. The National Churches Trust pledged £473,750 to the church, along 33 other churches, to repair the roof.

== Exterior ==
The church's bell tower was constructed in the mid-13th century. However, the first documentation of any actual bells was in 1637. In 1789, six bells were cast by Thomas and William Mears in the now-defunct Whitechapel Bell Foundry. In 1840, one of the bells was recast for an unknown reason.

Funding by the parish council and other local parties let the bells be taken to the Whites of Appleton in October 2009, located in Oxfordshire be repaired. Two new bells were cast, and in April 2010, the bells were returned and rehung.

The churchyard was closed on an unknown date, but a church-run cemetery was built nearby.

== Interior ==
The church contains a pipe organ, dating back to 1875 and was built by William Hill and Son. A specification of the organ can be found on the National Pipe Organ Register.

== Parish Status ==
The church is in a joint parish with:

- All Saints Church, Bow Brickhill
- St Mary Magdalene's Church, Little Brickhill
- St Luke's Church, Stoke Hammond
