= Bow Brickhill =

Civil parish in the City of Milton Keynes, England

Coordinates: 52.001°N 0.683°W

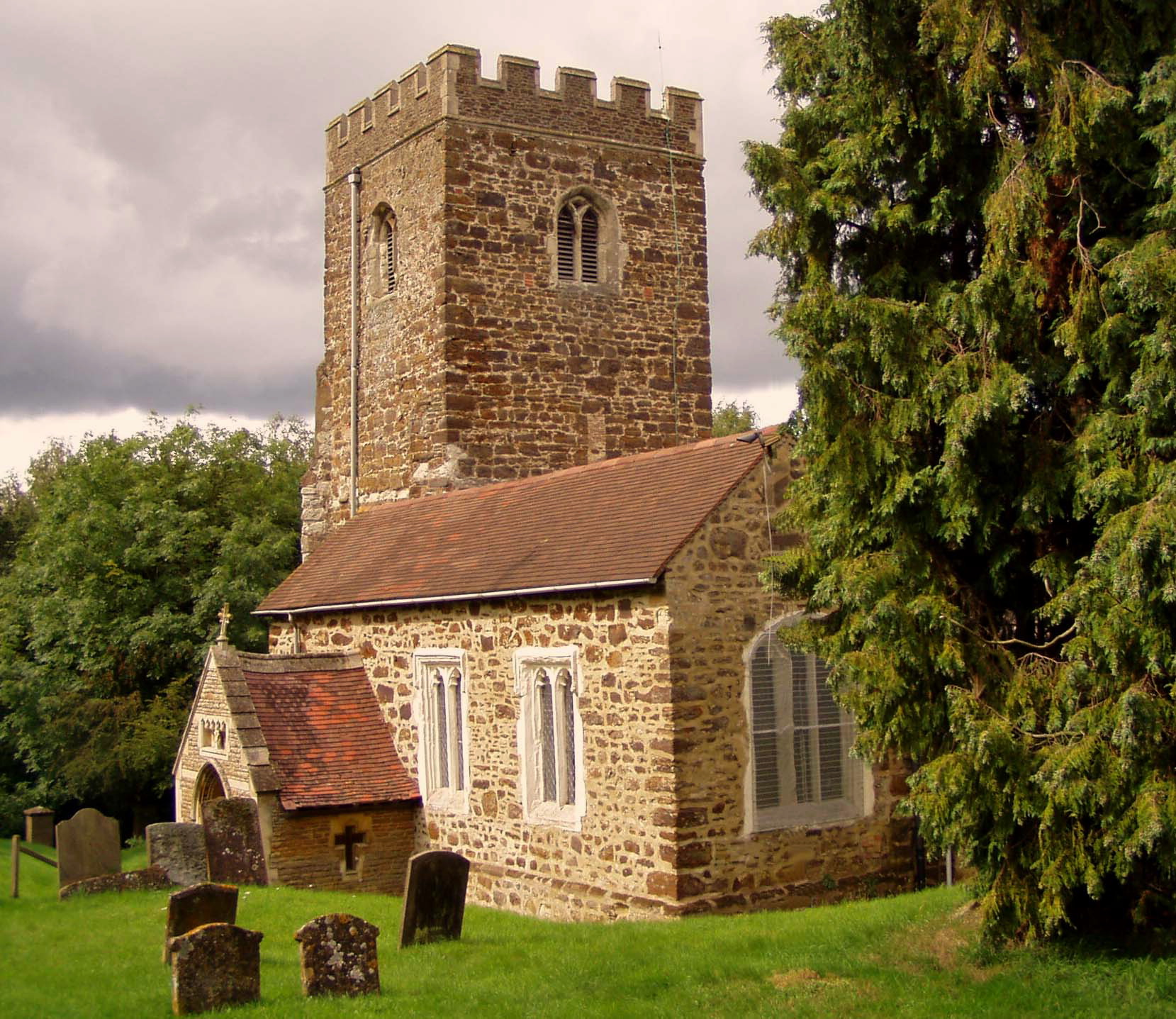
- All Saints’ Church, Bow Brickhill

- Location within Buckinghamshire
- Interactive map of Bow Brickhill
- Population: 622 (2021 census)
- OS grid reference: SP9034
- Civil parish: Bow Brickhill
- District: City of Milton Keynes
- Unitary authority: Milton Keynes City Council
- Ceremonial county: Buckinghamshire
- Region: South East
- Country: England
- Sovereign state: United Kingdom
- Post town: Milton Keynes
- Postcode district: MK17
- Dialling code: 01908
- Police: Thames Valley
- Fire: Buckinghamshire
- Ambulance: South Central
- UK Parliament: Milton Keynes Central

Bow Brickhill is a village and civil parish in the unitary authority area of the City of Milton Keynes, Buckinghamshire, England. It is bounded to the north, west and east by the Milton Keynes urban area, approximately 2 miles (3.2 km) east of Fenny Stratford, 1.5 miles (2.4 km) west of Woburn Sands and 4 miles (6.4 km) south-east of Central Milton Keynes. (Note: As the crow flies. Driving distances are 3.3, 1.7 and 7.8 miles respectively.)

The village name is a combination of Brythonic and Old English words for 'hill' (Brythonic: breg, Anglo Saxon hyll). The prefix 'Bow' comes from an Anglo Saxon personal name, Bolla. The various names of the village given in historic records were Brichelle (11th century); Brichull (12th century); Bolle Brichulle, Bellebrikhulle (13th century), and Bolbryghyll (15th century, 1418).

== Church ==
The Church of England parish church of All Saints stands apart from the rest of the village, on the side of a steep hill. The church probably dates from the 12th century but heavy remodelling in the 15th century obliterated most of the earlier details. The church was extensively restored by Browne Willis in 1757.

The hymn tune Bow Brickhill by Sydney Nicholson was composed in honour of All Saints' parish church, after Nicholson and his choristers from Westminster Abbey performed there in 1923.

== Transport ==
=== Rail ===
Bow Brickhill railway station, about 0.5 miles (0.8 km) west of the village, is on the Marston Vale Line between Bletchley and Bedford.

=== Bus ===
The village is served hourly (Mon-Sat) by the LOOP bus service operated by Arriva both clockwise via Bletchley and counter-clockwise via Woburn Sands towards CMK.

== Listed buildings and structures ==
The parish church is listed as Grade II*. There are a further four buildings or structures listed as Grade II.

== See also ==
- Great Brickhill
- Little Brickhill
- Bow Brickhill War Memorial
