= M45 motorway =

Motorway in England

M45
- M45 highlighted in blue
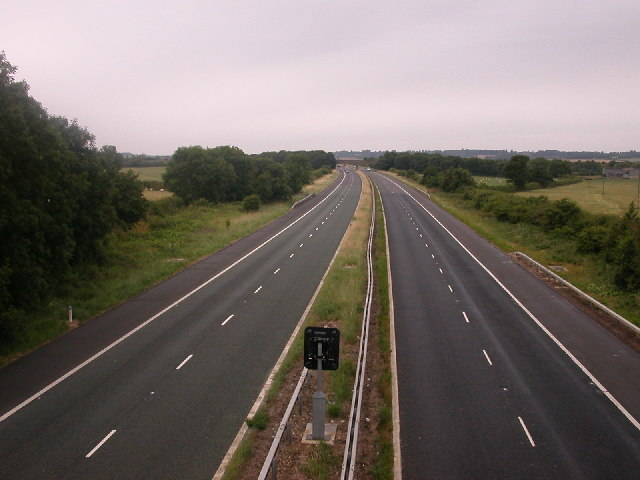
- Near Barby, Northamptonshire, 2005

Route information
- Maintained by National Highways
- Length: 7.9 mi (12.7 km)
- Existed: 1959–present

Major junctions
- East end: Watford Gap
- M1 motorway; A45
- West end: Thurlaston

Location
- Country: United Kingdom
- Primary destinations: Rugby, Coventry

Road network
- Roads in the United Kingdom; Motorways; A and B road zones
← M42	→ M48

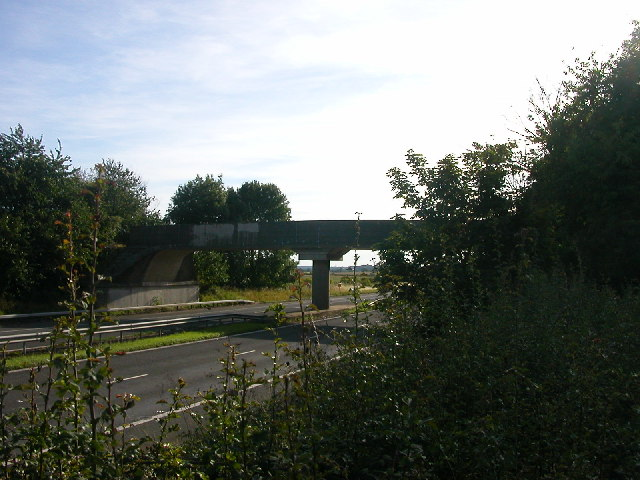
One of the original Owen Williams bridges

The M45 is a motorway in Northamptonshire and Warwickshire, England and is 7.9 miles (12.7 km) long. It runs between junction 17 of the M1 motorway south east of Rugby and a junction with the A45 road southwest of Rugby. It has one of the lowest traffic volumes of the United Kingdom motorway system.

== History ==
Built in 1959 when the M1 (as part of a link from London to Birmingham) went as far as Junction 18, the M45 was designed to dissipate some of the motorway traffic before the M1 terminated. Its equivalent at the southern end of the M1 is the former M10, which was downgraded on 1 May 2009 to become part of the A414.

As the signposted route to Birmingham, accompanied by a boom in private motor ownership in the 1960s, the M45 (and its effective continuation, the final 30 miles (48 km) or so along the predominantly dual carriageway A45), formed a key leg of one of the busiest roads in Britain.

From February to September 1967, six miles was reconstructed with a better hard shoulder. The original M1 motorway was reconstructed around 1966.

In 1972, the opening of the M6 parallel to the north provided a much faster route through to the West Midlands from London. Most traffic diverted to this route, and since January 1991 additional West Midlands traffic, whether to the south of that region, or from the south side of London has often used the M40 motorway parallel to the south, leaving the route with only a fraction of its previous traffic.

A limited-access junction (Eastbound exit and Westbound entry) was added in September 1991, around two-thirds of the way along from the M1, south of Dunchurch, the main southern suburban village (to Rugby) nearby. Apart from this, the motorway is very much in its 'as-built' condition and unlike its feeder motorway, the M1 its land use has not expanded, in a county that has three motorways running east–west almost wholly across it, Warwickshire. The choice of routes means that logistics operations are an important part of the economy of Coventry and Rugby.

== Junctions ==
Data from driver location signs are used to provide distance and carriageway identifier information.

M45 motorway junctions
miles	km	Westbound exits (A carriageway)	Junction	Eastbound exits (B carriageway)
7.7	12.4	Coventry, Rugby, A45; Dunchurch B4429	J1	Start of motorway
6.0	9.7	No access	J2	Daventry A45
		Entering Warwickshire		Entering Northamptonshire
0.1	0.2	Start of motorway	M1, J17	The south, Northampton M1
Notes: Distances in kilometres and carriageway identifiers are obtained from driver location signs/location marker posts. Where a junction spans several hundred metres and the data is available, both the start and finish values for the junction are shown.
1.000 mi = 1.609 km; 1.000 km = 0.621 mi: Incomplete access

== See also ==
- List of motorways in the United Kingdom
- Onley (lost settlement)
