= Barby, Northamptonshire =

Village in Northamptonshire, England

Coordinates: 52.3281°N 1.2046°W

Barby
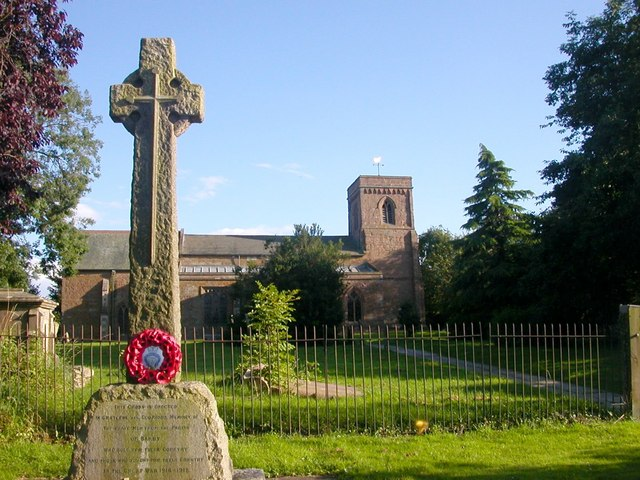
- Barby war memorial, with St Mary's parish church behind

- Location within Northamptonshire
- Population: 2,336 (2011 Census)
- OS grid reference: SP543703
  - London: 84 miles (135 km) via M1 motorway junction 18
- Civil parish: Barby
- Unitary authority: West Northamptonshire
- Ceremonial county: Northamptonshire
- Region: East Midlands
- Country: England
- Sovereign state: United Kingdom
- Post town: RUGBY
- Postcode district: CV23
- Dialling code: 01788
- Police: Northamptonshire
- Fire: Northamptonshire
- Ambulance: East Midlands
- UK Parliament: Daventry
- Website: Barby & Onley Parish Council

Barby is a village and civil parish about 5 miles (8 km) north of Daventry in Northamptonshire, England. The 2011 Census recorded the parish population as 2,336. Barby is located right off the M45 motorway a short spur from the M1 motorway to the A45 Trunk Road.

To the northwest and southwest the parish boundary forms part of the county boundary with Warwickshire, and the village is only about 4 miles (6.4 km) southeast of Rugby. Rains Brook, a tributary of the River Leam, forms the parish and county boundary northwest of the village.

The village is near the top of a hill that rises to 551 feet (168 m) above sea level south of the village. Barby's toponym comes from the Old Norse Bergbýr, meaning "hill dwelling".

== Archaeology ==
North of the village is a Norman motte and earthworks but no bailey. It is called Barby Castle but is really the site of an early fortified manor house. The abandoned village of Onley is in the north-west of the parish.

== Parish church ==
The oldest part of the Church of England parish church of St Mary is a Saxon window west of the south doorway. The windows in the north wall of the chancel were inserted about 1300, which is when the west tower was built. The church is a Grade II* listed building.

The tower has a ring of five bells. The third bell was cast at Leicester in about 1599. Hugh II Watts, who had foundries at Leicester and Bedford, cast the second bell in 1622. Mears and Stainbank of the Whitechapel Bell Foundry cast the treble bell in about 1871. John Taylor & Co of Loughborough cast the fourth and tenor bells in 1922. At the same time Taylor's also cast the sanctus bell.

Barby Rectory was built in 1869. St Mary's is part of a single benefice with St Faith's, Kilsby.

== Economic and social history ==
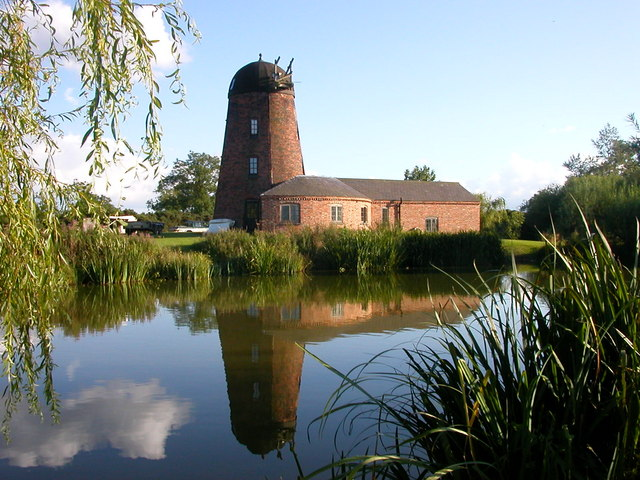
Barby Mill, now a private home

The Oxford Canal was dug through the parish in the early 1770s, passing about 1 1/2 miles (2.4 km) west of the village. In 1774 it opened from Bedworth in Warwickshire as far south as Napton-on-the-Hill. The nearest wharf was outside Willoughby, about 2 miles (3 km) southwest of Barby. The canal reached Oxford at the end of 1789.

South of Barby village is an early 19th-century former tower mill, which has been converted into a private home.

The Great Central Main Line from Nottingham Victoria to London Marylebone was built through the west of the parish in the 1890s and opened in 1899. Its nearest railway station was at Willoughby Wharf. The railway station was renamed twice, the second time in 1938 when the London and North Eastern Railway renamed it Braunston and Willoughby.

British Railways closed Braunston and Willoughby railway station in 1957. The M45 motorway was built through the parish in the late 1950s and opened in 1959, passing about 1/2 mile (800 m) north of the village. In 1963 The Reshaping of British Railways report recommended that British Railways close the railway, which it did in 1966.

== Amenities ==
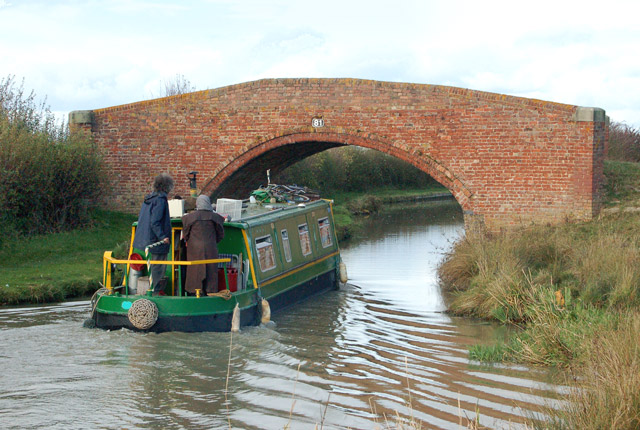
A narrowboat approaches a bridge over the Oxford Canal west of Barby

The village has a Church of England primary school. There are a general shop and post office, a garden centre, a village hall and a children's play area.

Barby Cricket Ground is in Longdown Lane opposite the windmill. The club plays in the Warwickshire League and has men's, women's and junior sides.

Stagecoach Midlands bus route D1 runs hourly between Rugby and Daventry via Barby. It also has a pub, the Arnold Arms.

== Twin village ==
Since 1995, the village has been twinned with Vulaines-sur-Seine in France.

== Sources ==
- Pevsner, Nikolaus; Cherry, Bridget (revision) (1973) [1961]. Northamptonshire. The Buildings of England (2nd ed.). Harmondsworth: Penguin Books. ISBN 0-14-071022-1.
- RCHME, ed. (1981). An Inventory of the Historical Monuments in the County of Northamptonshire. Vol. 3, Archaeological Sites in North-West Northamptonshire. London: Her Majesty's Stationery Office. pp. 12–14.
