= Grade II* listed buildings in Warwick (district) =

There are over 20,000 Grade II* listed buildings in England. This page is a list of these buildings in the district of Warwick in Warwickshire.

== Warwick ==
Name	Location	Type	Completed (Note: The date given is the date used by Historic England as significant for the initial building or that of an important part in the structure's description.)	Date designated	Grid ref. (Note: The grid reference is based on the British national grid reference system, sometimes known as OSGB36, used by the Ordnance Survey.) Geo-coordinates	Entry number (Note: The "List Entry Number" is a unique number assigned to each listed building and scheduled monument by Historic England.)	Image
Church of St Michael	Baddesley Clinton, Warwick	Church	13th century	11 April 1967	SP2026071359; 52°20′24″N 1°42′15″W	1035101	Church of St Michael More images
Barford House	Barford, Warwick	Country House	c. 1820	11 April 1967	SP2701360532; 52°14′32″N 1°36′21″W	1035249	Barford House More images
Church of St Peter	Barford, Warwick	Parish Church	Late 14th century	11 April 1967	SP2723460909; 52°14′44″N 1°36′09″W	1116437	Church of St Peter More images
Abbey Ruins approximately 10 Metres South of Church of St Leonard	Wroxall, Beausale, Haseley, Honiley and Wroxall, Warwick	Chapter House	c. 1135	11 April 1967	SP2219970708; 52°20′02″N 1°40′32″W	1365012	Abbey Ruins approximately 10 Metres South of Church of St Leonard
Abbey Ruins approximately 15 Metres South of Church of St Leonard	Wroxall, Beausale, Haseley, Honiley and Wroxall, Warwick	Abbey	c. 1135	11 April 1967	SP2217170698; 52°20′02″N 1°40′34″W	1300031	Abbey Ruins approximately 15 Metres South of Church of St Leonard
Church Gate Piers West of Church of St John	Honiley, Beausale, Haseley, Honiley and Wroxall, Warwick	Gate Pier	c. 1723	23 January 1987	SP2442072225; 52°20′51″N 1°38′35″W	1035213	Church Gate Piers West of Church of St John More images
The Hunting Lodge	Castle Park, Bishop's Tachbrook, Warwick	House	1748	6 November 1979	SP2936763010; 52°15′52″N 1°34′16″W	1035221	The Hunting Lodge
Church of St Charles (Roman Catholic)	Hampton on the Hill, Budbrooke, Warwick	Church	1819	23 January 1987	SP2524564320; 52°16′35″N 1°37′53″W	1115663	Church of St Charles (Roman Catholic) More images
Church of Holy Trinity	Hatton Green, Hatton, Warwick	Parish Church	15th century	11 April 1967	SP2360267368; 52°18′14″N 1°39′19″W	1035212	Church of Holy Trinity More images
The Old Vicarage	Hatton Green, Hatton, Warwick	House	Mid 18th century	11 April 1967	SP2323967555; 52°18′20″N 1°39′38″W	1035208	Upload Photo
Hunningham Railway Bridge	Marton Junction, Hunningham, Warwick	Railway	1849-1850	30 August 1996	SP3824166516; 52°17′44″N 1°26′27″W	1268297	Hunningham Railway Bridge More images
Abbotsford School	Kenilworth, Warwick	School	Late 18th century	1 June 1949	SP2866472522; 52°21′00″N 1°34′50″W	1300483	Abbotsford School More images
Church of St John Evangelist	Kenilworth, Warwick	Church	1851-2	10 November 1971	SP2921371086; 52°20′14″N 1°34′22″W	1183921	Church of St John Evangelist More images
Church of St Giles	Packwood, Lapworth, Warwick	Church	c. 1300	5 December 1949	SP1699072811; 52°21′11″N 1°45′07″W	1035112	Church of St Giles More images
Bridge 160 Yards South West of Goodrest Farmhouse	Leek Wootton, Leek Wootton and Guy's Cliffe, Warwick	Bridge	1441	23 January 1987	SP2734468912; 52°19′03″N 1°36′01″W	1035180	Upload Photo
Chapel of St Mary Magdalene	Guy's Cliffe, Leek Wootton and Guy's Cliffe, Warwick	Chapel	Late 14th century	11 April 1967	SP2931266810; 52°17′55″N 1°34′18″W	1117390	Chapel of St Mary Magdalene More images
Church of Holy Trinity	Norton Lindsey, Warwick	Parish Church	Early 13th century	11 April 1967	SP2292463080; 52°15′55″N 1°39′56″W	1186751	Church of Holy Trinity More images
Church of Saint Gregory	Offchurch, Warwick	Church	C11/C12	11 April 1967	SP3581865656; 52°17′16″N 1°28′35″W	1035084	Church of Saint Gregory More images
Offchurch Bury	Offchurch Bury, Offchurch, Warwick	House	Earlier than late 18th century	11 April 1967	SP3451066056; 52°17′30″N 1°29′44″W	1035085	Offchurch Bury More images
Pinley Abbey and attached Remains of Priory Church	Great Pinley, Rowington, Warwick	House	19th century	11 April 1967	SP2136165760; 52°17′22″N 1°41′18″W	1184435	Upload Photo
Remains of Priory Church approximately 10 Metres East of Pinley Abbey	Great Pinley, Rowington, Warwick	Workshop	1990	11 April 1967	SP2138365760; 52°17′22″N 1°41′17″W	1035091	Upload Photo
The Cottage, approximately 4 Metres North of Pinley Abbey	Great Pinley, Rowington, Warwick	House	19th century	11 June 1967	SP2135865774; 52°17′23″N 1°41′18″W	1184454	Upload Photo
Yarningale Aqueduct (that Part in Rowington Parish) South Stratford Canal	South Stratford Canal, Rowington, Warwick	Aqueduct	1834	16 February 1990	SP1839566384; 52°17′43″N 1°43′54″W	1184618	Yarningale Aqueduct (that Part in Rowington Parish) South Stratford Canal More images
Binswood Hall, North Leamington School	Royal Leamington Spa, Warwick	School	1847-8	25 March 1970	SP3164466587; 52°17′47″N 1°32′15″W	1381190	Binswood Hall, North Leamington School More images
Church of All Saints	Royal Leamington Spa, Warwick	Church	1825	19 November 1953	SP3200165428; 52°17′10″N 1°31′56″W	1381145	Church of All Saints More images
Church of St John the Baptist	Royal Leamington Spa, Warwick	Church	1877-8	25 March 1970	SP3212264521; 52°16′40″N 1°31′50″W	1381539	Church of St John the Baptist More images
Church of St Mark	New Milverton, Royal Leamington Spa, Warwick	Church	1879	19 November 1953	SP3107266310; 52°17′39″N 1°32′45″W	1381515	Church of St Mark More images
Leamington Real Tennis Club	Royal Leamington Spa, Warwick	Tennis Club	1846	25 March 1970	SP3169365829; 52°17′23″N 1°32′12″W	1381165	Leamington Real Tennis Club More images
Number 1, Lansdowne Circus and attached Railings and Wall	Royal Leamington Spa, Warwick	Villa	c1834-1838	19 November 1953	SP3227566120; 52°17′32″N 1°31′42″W	1381343	Number 1, Lansdowne Circus and attached Railings and Wall
Numbers 2 and 3, Lansdowne Circus and attached Walls	Royal Leamington Spa, Warwick	Villa	c1834-1838	19 November 1953	SP3227066138; 52°17′33″N 1°31′42″W	1381345	Numbers 2 and 3, Lansdowne Circus and attached Walls
Numbers 4 and 5, Lansdowne Circus and attached Walls	Royal Leamington Spa, Warwick	Villa	c1834-1838	19 November 1953	SP3227266155; 52°17′33″N 1°31′42″W	1381346	Numbers 4 and 5, Lansdowne Circus and attached Walls
Numbers 6 and 7, Lansdowne Circus and attached Walls	Royal Leamington Spa, Warwick	Villa	c1834-1838	19 November 1953	SP3228066173; 52°17′34″N 1°31′41″W	1381347	Numbers 6 and 7, Lansdowne Circus and attached Walls
Numbers 8 and 9, Lansdowne Circus and attached Walls	Royal Leamington Spa, Warwick	Villa	c1834-1838	19 November 1953	SP3229666184; 52°17′34″N 1°31′40″W	1381348	Numbers 8 and 9, Lansdowne Circus and attached Walls
Numbers 10 and 11, Lansdowne Circus and attached Walls	Royal Leamington Spa, Warwick	Villa	c1834-1838	19 November 1953	SP3231766180; 52°17′34″N 1°31′39″W	1381349	Numbers 10 and 11, Lansdowne Circus and attached Walls
Numbers 12 and 13, Lansdowne Circus and attached Walls	Royal Leamington Spa, Warwick	Villa	c1834-1836	19 November 1953	SP3233266169; 52°17′34″N 1°31′39″W	1381350	Numbers 12 and 13, Lansdowne Circus and attached Walls More images
Numbers 14 and 15, Lansdowne Circus and attached Walls	Royal Leamington Spa, Warwick	Villa	c1834-1838	19 November 1953	SP3233966151; 52°17′33″N 1°31′38″W	1381351	Numbers 14 and 15, Lansdowne Circus and attached Walls
Numbers 16 and 17, Lansdowne Circus and attached Walls	Royal Leamington Spa, Warwick	Villa	c1834-1838	19 November 1953	SP3233866132; 52°17′33″N 1°31′38″W	1381352	Numbers 16 and 17, Lansdowne Circus and attached Walls
Numbers 12-42, Parade and attached Railings to Numbers 16 and 18 and 20a	Royal Leamington Spa, Warwick	Flats	1953	19 November 1953	SP3173866134; 52°17′33″N 1°32′10″W	1381407	Numbers 12-42, Parade and attached Railings to Numbers 16 and 18 and 20a
Numbers 1-6, Clarence Mansions and attached Railings	Royal Leamington Spa, Warwick	Flats	1999	19 November 1953	SP3150866039; 52°17′30″N 1°32′22″W	1381225	Numbers 1-6, Clarence Mansions and attached Railings More images
Numbers 19-57, Lansdowne Crescent and attached Railings	Royal Leamington Spa, Warwick	Flats	1999	19 November 1953	SP3219966134; 52°17′33″N 1°31′46″W	1381354	Numbers 19-57, Lansdowne Crescent and attached Railings
Regent Hotel	Royal Leamington Spa, Warwick	Hotel	1818-1819	19 November 1953	SP3180765840; 52°17′23″N 1°32′06″W	1381422	Regent Hotel More images
83 and 83a Holly Walk (upper)	Royal Leamington Spa, Warwick	Villa	c. 1838	15 February 1973	SP3230366075; 52°17′31″N 1°31′40″W	1381314	83 and 83a Holly Walk (upper) More images
Church of All Saints	Sherbourne, Warwick	Parish Church	1862-4	11 April 1967	SP2622361184; 52°14′54″N 1°37′02″W	1035139	Church of All Saints More images
Sherbourne Park	Sherbourne, Warwick	House	c. 1700	11 April 1967	SP2629761294; 52°14′57″N 1°36′58″W	1035141	Upload Photo
Conservatory 7 Yards to South of Stoneleigh Abbey	Stoneleigh, Warwick	Conservatory	1770	11 April 1967	SP3188271202; 52°20′17″N 1°32′01″W	1087012	Upload Photo
Iron Gate and Screen 11 Yards to South of South Wing of Stoneleigh Abbey	Stoneleigh, Warwick	Gate	1770	23 January 1987	SP3186271222; 52°20′17″N 1°32′02″W	1086942	Upload Photo
Moat Farmhouse	Stoneleigh, Warwick	Farmhouse	Late 15th century or early 16th century	11 November 1952	SP2614275147; 52°22′25″N 1°37′03″W	1075940	Upload Photo
New Bridge	Stoneleigh, Warwick	Bridge	1814	10 September 1973	SP3144571521; 52°20′27″N 1°32′24″W	1035264	New Bridge More images
Stables and Riding School 100 Yards North East of Stoneleigh Abbey	Stoneleigh, Warwick	House	1814	30 November 1982	SP3200271312; 52°20′20″N 1°31′54″W	1364976	Stables and Riding School 100 Yards North East of Stoneleigh Abbey
Stare Bridge	River Avon, Stoneleigh, Warwick	Bridge	Late 15th century	11 April 1967	SP3296071457; 52°20′25″N 1°31′04″W	1106390	Stare Bridge More images
Church of Saint John the Baptist	Wappenbury, Warwick	Parish Church	circa 13th century	11 April 1967	SP3780469282; 52°19′13″N 1°26′48″W	1106276	Church of Saint John the Baptist More images
Allens House	Warwick	Timber Framed House	Late 16th century	10 January 1953	SP2854664753; 52°16′49″N 1°34′59″W	1035426	Allens House More images
Castle Bridge	Warwick	Bridge	1790-1793	10 January 1953	SP2878064690; 52°16′47″N 1°34′46″W	1184083	Castle Bridge More images
Conservatory	Warwick Castle Park, Warwick	Conservatory	Late 18th century	19 March 1973	SP2817664694; 52°16′47″N 1°35′18″W	1184061	Conservatory More images
Elizabethan House	Warwick	House	18th century	10 January 1953	SP2805464711; 52°16′47″N 1°35′25″W	1035432	Elizabethan House More images
Entrance Gateway to St John's House and Flanking Boundary Walls	Warwick	Gate	Late 17th century	19 March 1973	SP2870165122; 52°17′01″N 1°34′51″W	1035400	Entrance Gateway to St John's House and Flanking Boundary Walls More images
Landor House	Warwick	House	1692-1693	10 January 1953	SP2843165014; 52°16′57″N 1°35′05″W	1185233	Landor House More images
Longbridge Manor	Longbridge, Warwick	House	Late 16th century or Early 17th century	10 January 1953	SP2684962570; 52°15′38″N 1°36′29″W	1364837	Upload Photo
Museum	Warwick	Market Hall	Late 17th century	10 January 1953	SP2802264924; 52°16′54″N 1°35′26″W	1035417	Museum More images
Norman Arch in Garden of Lord Leicesters Hospital	Warwick	Chapel	Norman	10 January 1953	SP2800664762; 52°16′49″N 1°35′27″W	1184544	Upload Photo
Okens House	Warwick	House	1864	10 January 1953	SP2828064804; 52°16′50″N 1°35′13″W	1364795	Okens House More images
Portion of Boundary Wall to Warwick Castle abutting Mill Street	Warwick	Castle	Late 18th century	10 January 1953	SP2849464714; 52°16′47″N 1°35′02″W	1364806	Portion of Boundary Wall to Warwick Castle abutting Mill Street More images
Quaker Meeting House	Warwick	Friends Meeting House	1690S	10 January 1953	SP2808064738; 52°16′48″N 1°35′23″W	1035431	Quaker Meeting House More images
Remains of Old Castle Bridge	Warwick	Bridge	Late Medieval	10 January 1953	SP2853264624; 52°16′44″N 1°35′00″W	1035499	Remains of Old Castle Bridge More images
St Michael's Place	Saltisford, Warwick	House	1973	10 January 1953	SP2770265422; 52°17′10″N 1°35′43″W	1364850	St Michael's Place More images
108, 108a Saltisford	Saltisford, Warwick	Chapel	1973	10 January 1953	SP2769665398; 52°17′10″N 1°35′43″W	1035366	108, 108a Saltisford More images
Stables Warwick Castle	Warwick	Stable	1768-1771	10 January 1953	SP2836364809; 52°16′51″N 1°35′08″W	1035508	Upload Photo
The Athenaeum	Warwick	Club	18th century	10 January 1953	SP2822464915; 52°16′54″N 1°35′16″W	1364798	The Athenaeum More images
The Gables	Warwick	House	Later alteration	10 January 1953	SP2853664736; 52°16′48″N 1°34′59″W	1184801	The Gables More images
The Marble House	Warwick	House	Early 17th century	10 January 1953	SP2787764967; 52°16′56″N 1°35′34″W	1185275	The Marble House More images
The Priory	Warwick	House	16th century	10 January 1953	SP2826365280; 52°17′06″N 1°35′14″W	1035503	The Priory More images
Warwick Castle Mill	Warwick	Castle	1767-1768	10 January 1953	SP2846364660; 52°16′46″N 1°35′03″W	1035507	Warwick Castle Mill More images
Warwickshire County Council Staff Club, Northgate and Northgate House	Northgate, Warwick	House	Late 17th century	10 January 1953	SP2812265141; 52°17′01″N 1°35′21″W	1364826	Warwickshire County Council Staff Club, Northgate and Northgate House More images
Woodloes Farmhouse	Warwick	Farmhouse	1562	10 January 1953	SP2781567003; 52°18′02″N 1°35′37″W	1035360	Upload Photo
43 Mill Street	Warwick	House	18th century	10 January 1953	SP2852764723; 52°16′48″N 1°35′00″W	1035427	43 Mill Street More images
10 Market Place	Warwick	House	1714	10 January 1953	SP2802265015; 52°16′57″N 1°35′26″W	1184698	10 Market Place More images
18 and 20 Northgate Street	Warwick	House	Late 17th century (From 1694)	10 January 1953	SP2814665077; 52°16′59″N 1°35′20″W	1364829	18 and 20 Northgate Street More images
1, Jury Street	Warwick	House/Shops	Late 17th century	10 January 1953	SP2824364883; 52°16′53″N 1°35′15″W	1364813	1, Jury Street
33, 35 Jury Street (Porridge Pot)	Warwick	House	17th century	10 January 1953	SP2835464968; 52°16′56″N 1°35′09″W	1035448	Upload Photo
54, High Street, 1 and 1a, Brook Street	Warwick	Open Hall House	15th century	10 January 1953	SP2806164759; 52°16′49″N 1°35′24″W	1300104	54, High Street, 1 and 1a, Brook Street More images
90, 92 West Street	Warwick	House/Inn	Later alteration	10 January 1953	SP2782564407; 52°16′38″N 1°35′37″W	1035350	90, 92 West Street More images
1, High Street	Warwick	House/Restaurant	Late 17th century	10 January 1953	SP2823764850; 52°16′52″N 1°35′15″W	1035464	1, High Street
2, 4 High Street	Warwick	House/Shop	Late 17th century	10 January 1953	SP2822264869; 52°16′52″N 1°35′16″W	1364844	2, 4 High Street More images
23, 25 Market Place	Warwick	Jettied House	c. 1634	10 January 1953	SP2807864906; 52°16′54″N 1°35′23″W	1364840	23, 25 Market Place More images
Old Manor House	Wasperton, Warwick	House	18th century	11 April 1967	SP2641058805; 52°13′37″N 1°36′53″W	1325532	Upload Photo

== See also ==
- Grade I listed buildings in Warwickshire
