= Honiley =

Village in Warwickshire, England

Coordinates: 52°21′N 1°39′W

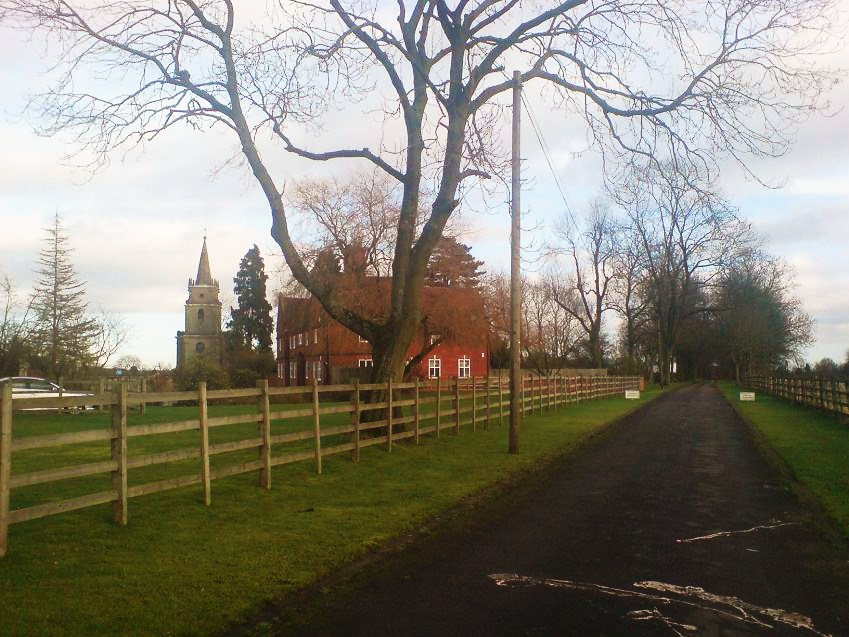

- Location within Warwickshire
- Population: 62 (2001 census)
- Civil parish: Beausale, Haseley, Honiley and Wroxall
- District: Warwick
- Shire county: Warwickshire
- Region: West Midlands
- Country: England
- Sovereign state: United Kingdom

Honiley is a small village and former civil parish, now in the parish of Beausale, Haseley, Honiley and Wroxall, in the Warwick district, in the county of Warwickshire, England. It is 3 miles (5 km) from Kenilworth, and 6.5 miles (10 km) from Coventry on the A4177 road. The 2001 Census recorded a parish population of 62. Honiley was merged with adjoining parishes on 1 April 2007 and can now be found under Beausale, Haseley, Honiley and Wroxall.

== History ==
The Church of England parish church of Saint John the Baptist is a Georgian Baroque building of 1723. It has a nave, apse, and short spire. The interior includes original box pews and a west gallery. Honiley once had two wells associated with the church. If a man and a woman produced a child out of wedlock the two were to go to village wells (the men to St John's well, the women to Our Lady's well) and bathe. After that they were to crawl to the church to the statue of St John and ask for forgiveness. The village was, for a while at least, a small centre of pilgrimage. The village has a medieval moat, a hotel and a small business park. A short distance north-east of the village is a vehicle proving ground that was formerly a Royal Air Force station. Opened in May 1941 the station was originally called RAF Ramsey but was renamed RAF Honiley three months later. It ceased to operate in March 1958 and the buildings were demolished in 1960 although new ones have replaced them. Honiley has a VOR station that is a major waypoint for aircraft.

"'Honiley', [parish], 5 1/2 m. NW. of Warwick. 12 c. Hunilegh; 13 c. Hunileye; 14 c. Honyle, Charters and Rolls in the British Museum 1.]. Anglo-Saxon hunig league (g=y), the honey lea, [see] Ley. Honey was an article of great importance to our forefathers, and rents were frequently paid by it. It was their sugar, and the wax was needed for light and religious services." (William Henry Duignan, 1912.) Honiley is pronounced locally as 'hun lee'. From The Gentleman's Magazine, 1848: "... King Edward IV. was arrested in the year 1469 by Archbishop Neville, with an armed band of horse, at Honiley in Warwickshire, and not at Ulney in Northamptonshire, or Olney in Buckinghamshire, as had been previously stated by several historians. This seizure was made by the advice of the Duke of Clarence and the Earl of Warwick. The King was then taken to Warwick Castle, from thence to York, and afterwards to Middleham Castle, from whence he escaped.

"Honiley, Coleshill, and other places in Warwickshire were at this period the property of Sir Simon Mountfort, and he was appointed by King Edward IV (according to the Patent Rolls in Rymer) one of the Commissioners to raise the county of Warwick in 1470. As it appears that Mountfort made Honiley his principal residence, it is very probable, from the intimacy subsisting between them, that when the King required a place of concealment, he selected Honiley for the purpose, which was somewhat more than "foure miles from Warwycke," as stated by a historian—for it is six. Honiley became forfeited to the Crown by the attainder of Mountfort in 1495.

"The large Manor house or Hall, probably built by this family, was most pleasantly situated on a gentle eminence, and was taken down in 1803 by the Rev. John Granville, the landlord, in order to avoid the expense of its reparation. Thus fell another ancient baronial residence, a sacrifice to bad taste and ruinous economy... "... The Queen Elizabeth I visited Kenilworth Castle again in July 1575 for 19 days, when, according to Laneham, she hunted "the hart of force" in the Chase, and probably visited Honiley Hall, which place was at the extremity of his woods, about three miles from the Castle. At this period the manor of Honiley belonged to the Earl of Leicester."

== Sources ==
- Pevsner, Nikolaus; Wedgwood, Alexandra (1966). Warwickshire. The Buildings of England. Harmondsworth: Penguin Books. pp. 312–313.
- Smith, B (1990). Hidden Warwickshire. Newbury: Countryside Books. ISBN 1-85306-098-4.
- Styles, Philip, ed. (1945). A History of the County of Warwick, Volume 3: Barlichway Hundred. Victoria County History. pp. 120–123.
