= 25 Oakhill Road =

Coordinates: 51.459374°N 0.205696°W

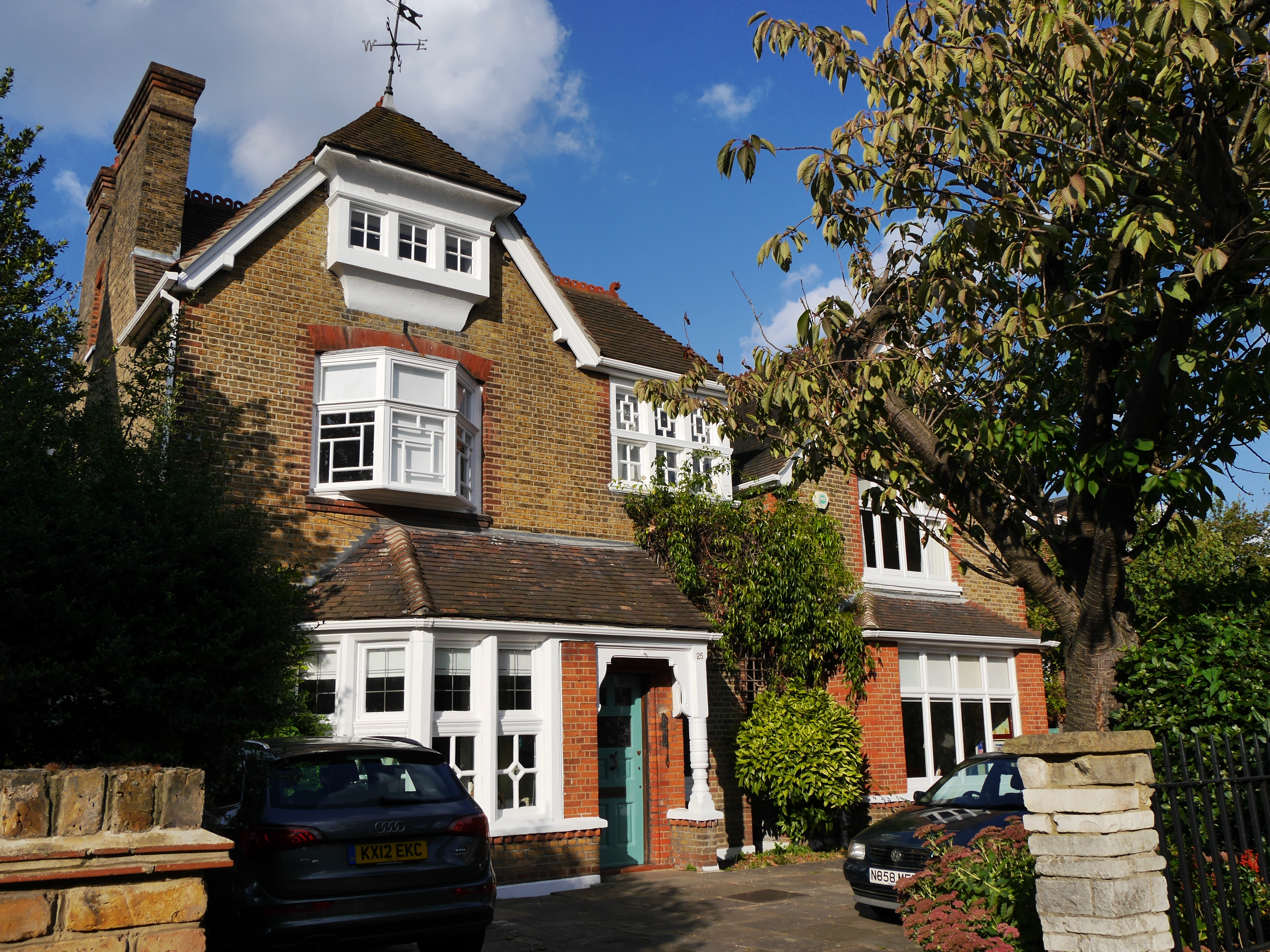
- Interactive map of the 25 Oakhill Road area

General information
- Status: Grade II listed
- Type: House
- Location: Oakhill Road, Putney, London SW15
- Completed: 1880

Height
- Roof: Tiled with ridge tiles

Technical details
- Floor count: 4

Design and construction
- Architect: William Young

25 Oakhill Road is a Grade II listed house in Oakhill Road, Putney, London SW15.

== History ==
- It was built in 1880 as Briarbank, by the architect William Young for his wife's sister. Young lived next door at 23 Oakhill Road.

== Historic England ==
- The description of the house, provided by National Heritage:
  - Main frontage 2-storeys and gable.
  - Yellow stocks, red brick dressings, and red rubbers.
  - Tiled roofs with ridge tiles.
  - Porch and 4-light canted bow to left, all beneath tiled lean-to roof: the porch with wooden turned pier and valance.
  - First floor wooden canted bow at left under cambered arch and 6-light mullion-and- transom window at right-hand angle.
  - Barge-boarded half-hipped gable with oriel, pargetted cove and vane.
  - To right 2-storey gabled bay with advanced 4-light ground floor window under lean- to roof, 4-light first floor window under cambered arch and bargeboarded gable.
  - Stacks with oversailing courses.
- This building is listed under the Planning (Listed Buildings and Conservation Areas) Act 1990 as amended for its special architectural or historic interest.

== Random Information ==
- Numerous residents have claimed to hear the ghost of an old woman in one of the upstairs bedrooms.
- There are two unmarked gravestones in the back garden.
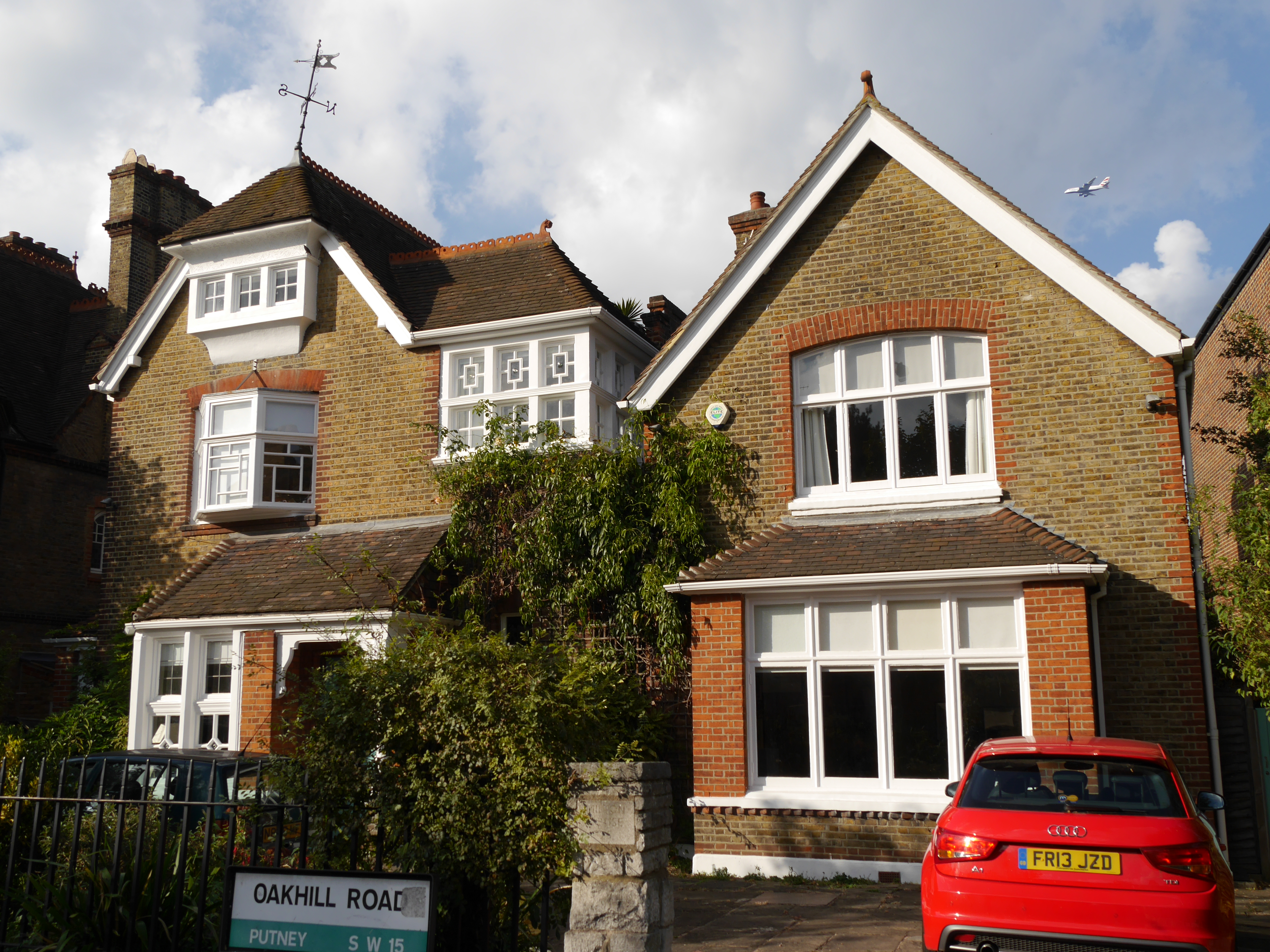
  Front view of house
