= James Sawyer =

Professor Sir James Sawyer FRSE FRCP FSA JP
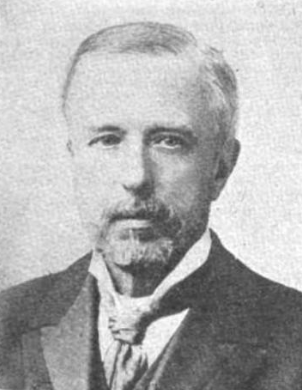
- Born: 11 August 1844; Carlisle, England
- Died: 19 January 1919 (aged 74); Hatton, England
- Education: Queen's College, Birmingham
- Occupation: Physician
- Spouse: Adelaide Mary Hill

Sir James Sawyer (11 August 1844 – 19 January 1919) was a British physician and cancer researcher famous in his day as a public educator in health matters, an early proponent of "daily habits".

== Childhood in Carlisle ==
James Sawyer was born in Carlisle on 11 August 1844, probably at 23 Fisher Street, above his father’s chemist shop. His father (also called James) had bought the business two years earlier from a man about to go bankrupt. Discovering it was for sale while working in a chemist’s shop at Ross-on-Wye, he promptly married Anne George, the daughter of a saddler, and returned to Carlisle.

James and Anne’s chemist shop stood near the Old King’s Head, run by James’s father (another James). Born in Martlesham, Suffolk, he had joined the Chestnut Troop of the Royal Artillery, which fought in many battles of the Peninsular War and at Waterloo. After the war, his commanding officer, Sir Hew Dalrymple Ross, married a Cumberland heiress and moved to Stonehouse in the parish of Hayton, eight miles from Carlisle. As he cared about Sawyer’s welfare and often visited him, he was probably instrumental in Sawyer's move to Carlisle in the 1820s. In the town, Sawyer was celebrated as a Waterloo veteran and almost certainly shared stories of his wartime exploits with his young grandson, James.

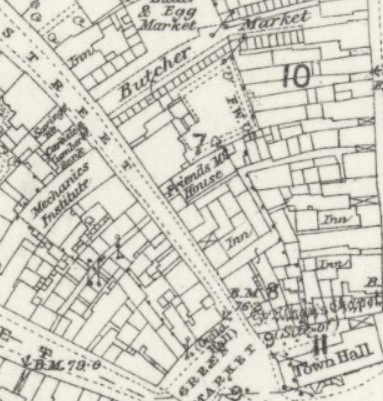
Fisher Street, Carlisle, in 1865. No. 23 was near the Friends Meeting House. (Reproduced with the permission of the National Library of Scotland).

Information about James’s early years is scarce. He was lucky to survive childhood, as child mortality in the city was high. Three of his six siblings died as children, and six of his father’s ten siblings also died young. He may have attended Carlisle Grammar School, as his father donated one pound to its extension fund in 1851. By age sixteen, he worked as an apprentice in his father’s shop. Then, in October 1861, his life changed radically.

His father’s sister, Sarah, was probably responsible for this change. In November 1854, she married Walter John Breach Scott, a man of exceptional ability who advanced rapidly in business. From being the manager of the refreshment room at Carlisle Station, he became the manager and then the business owner of the Queen’s Hotel, Birmingham. He soon became wealthy and, at his death in 1869, he left an estate worth £30,000.

Sarah used her newly acquired wealth and influence to help her family. In 1860, she arranged for her parents and her sisters, Maria and Caroline, to move to Birmingham to live in her country residence at Sparkhill. Her mother died at Sparkhill in 1861, and her father in 1863.

In 1861, she probably helped her nephew, James, move to Birmingham to train as a doctor. In addition to having the financial means, she had the right connections, as her husband was a generous supporter of the Queen’s Hospital and served on its board.

== Medical career in Birmingham ==
=== Student of Medicine at Queen's College ===
In October 1861, James began his studies in the medical department at Queen College, Birmingham. Knowing no Latin or Greek, he worked hard to learn the languages, completing extra exercises during the Christmas and Easter holidays and sending them to his Classics Professor.

His efforts paid off. In August 1862, he achieved five first prizes: mathematics, anatomy, botany, chemistry, and French. In March 1863, he won a Warneford scholarship and, in making the award, the College Council praised him for his classical learning and gentlemanly conduct. More medals and certificates followed, including practical chemistry in 1863, midwifery in 1864, and physiology in 1865.

Queen’s College awarded degrees through the University of London. In January 1863, James passed, in the first division, the entrance examination for his medical degree. In 1866, he passed the diploma to become a member of the Royal College of Surgeons. In November 1867, he passed, in the first division, his Bachelor of Medicine examination, achieving first-class honours in medicine. In 1873, he passed the M. D. examination.

=== Physician at the Queen's Hospital ===
On 20 December 1867, he became the resident physician at Queen’s Hospital. Also acting as a Medical Tutor, he remained in the post until October 1871, when he resigned to commence in private practice.

However, his connections to the hospital continued. From 1871 to 1889, he was an Honorary Physician and, from 1889, a Consulting Physician.

=== Private consultant, Professor at Queen's College and writer ===
From 1871 until 1913, he ran a large and lucrative private practice, eventually retiring on health grounds.

He held three Professorships at Queen's College. Professor of Pathology from 1875 to 1878; Professor of Materia Medica and Therapeutics from 1878 to 1885; and Professor of Medicine from 1885 to 1891.

While a resident physician at the Queen's Hospital, he wrote a book to help medical students diagnose diseases of the lungs and heart.

In 1872, he and some friends established the Birmingham Medical Review, which he edited for six years. I In 1886, he published a collection of essays that had previously appeared in medical journals as Contributions to Practical Medicine. In 1889, he published Notes on Medical Education, a book based on his lectures.

He was awarded a fellowship by the Royal College of Physicians in 1883 and the Royal Society of Edinburgh in 1891.

In 1885, he was elected president of the Birmingham and Midland Counties Branch of the British Medical Association.

In 1894, Lady Sawyer presented her husband's portrait, painted by Vivian Crome, to the General Committee of the Queen's Hospital.

In 1897, Sawyer shared the secret of longevity with a Birmingham audience. It rested, he maintained, on paying attention to nineteen small details. If people observed his rules, he could see no reason they should not live to be 100.

In 1908, Sawyer delivered the Lumleian Lecture at the Royal College of Physicians ("Points of Practice in Maladies of the Heart").

=== Cancer research ===
In 1900, Sawyer argued that the increased cancer rate in England and Wales was due to the excessive consumption of red meat. He suggested in his 1912 book Coprostasis that colorectal cancer was practically unknown amongst agricultural labourers because they worked in fields and had the opportunity to defecate in the natural squatting position.

== Political activism ==
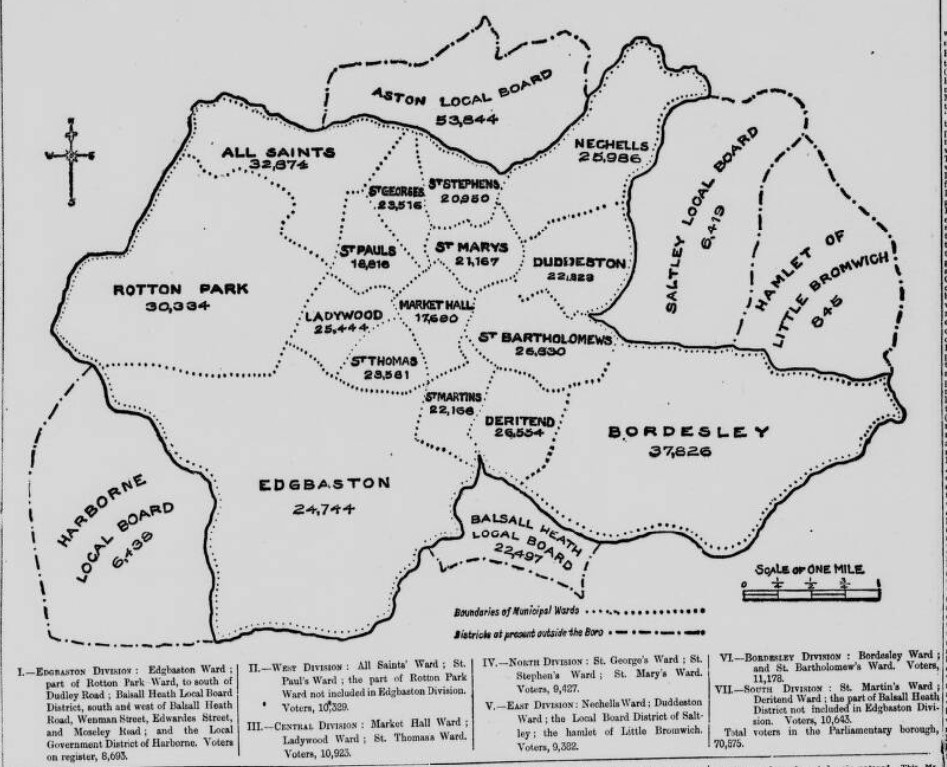
Political divisions of Birmingham in 1885

Sawyer and his wife were active in local politics, working strenuously for the Conservative Party.

Their activism began in Ladywood in the Central Division, one of the seven new divisions set up by the Redistribution of Seats Act 1885. Like many others, they had been attracted to work for the party by the "caucus" of clubs and committees operating at the grassroots level.

Sawyer and his wife soon adopted leadership roles. In September 1885, Sawyer was elected president of the Ladywood Conservative Club. By February 1886, he was president of the Ladywood Working Men's Conservative Club, a position he held for eight years. Lady Sawyer founded the Ladywood Habitation of the Primrose League in 1886 and served as its ruling councillor until 1914.

In November and December 1885, Sawyer played a prominent role in supporting Lord Randolph Churchill's bid to become M.P. for Central Birmingham. On 18 November 1885, Churchill and his wife visited Sawyer's home at Edgbaston to meet female party workers. Churchill lost to the sitting candidate, John Bright, but only by a narrow margin.

In November 1885, Queen Victoria gave him a knighthood because of his distinguished position in the medical profession and his services to the Queen's Hospital. His nomination for the honour came from Lord Randolph Churchill, who wished to reward him for his political campaigning and boost his future political appeal.

In April 1886, Sawyer was elected president of the Birmingham Conservative Association. In November 1886, he was elected chairman of the newly formed Midland Counties' Union of Conservative Associations.

In 1889, Sawyer was at the centre of a storm when local politics clashed with Westminster politics. The dispute was about which candidate the Conservatives should support in the by-election caused by the death of John Bright. The party leaders in Westminster supported Bright's son, while Sawyer and many others wished Churchill to stand again. After Balfour visited the city in April 1889, the local Conservative association chose Bright's son.

Four weeks after the election, Sawyer resigned as president of the Birmingham Conservative Association. However, he remained a member of the B.C.A.

Sawyer actively supported the Conservative Party until his health declined in 1913.

== Other interests ==
=== Charity work ===
In 1890, Sawyer was chairman of the Magdalen Home and Refuge, the General Institution for the Blind, and the Ladies' Association for the Care of Friendless Girls. In 1899, he was appointed Vice-President of the Midland Counties' Home for Incurables.

In 1910, he was on the committee elected to build a sanatorium to commemorate the late Edward VII and in 1911, he helped organise Birmingham's Coronation festivities. He also supported the Birmingham Medical Benevolent Society.

In 1910, Lady Sawyer became actively involved in the British Red Cross and hosted many meetings at Haseley Hall. Her husband shared her enthusiasm and said, in 1911, that if war broke out, he would allow the Red Cross to use his residence.

He was also a Freemason. and a magistrate.

=== Church activities ===
Sawyer served as Rector's warden at Haseley from 1892 to 1913, and Lady Sawyer and her daughters held rummage sales to support the village church. Sawyer was also actively involved in creating the new Diocese of Birmingham from the scheme's inception.

=== Historical interests ===
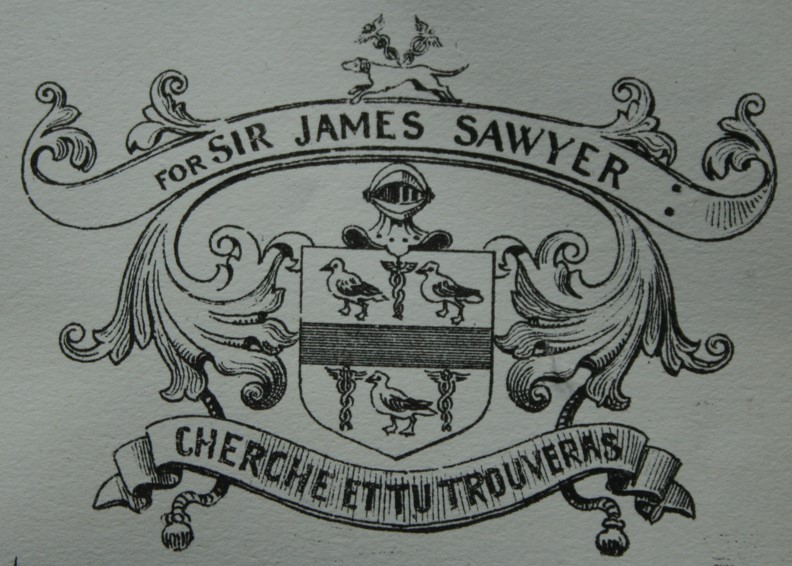
Sawyer's coat of arms

He was interested in heraldry and researched and made the arms of Sir William Harvey, which he presented to the Royal College of Physicians in 1910. He also devised a coat of arms for his family. In 1901, the Society of Antiquaries elected him as a fellow for his archaeological work and research into Haseley's history and Shakespeare's heraldry.

He was an early member of the Birmingham and District Society of East Anglians, formed in 1906, and served as president.

He liked to show visitors to Haseley Hall a silver-mounted hoof of Ronald, the charger that Lord Cardigan rode at the Battle of Balaclava. His wife had inherited the horse's hoof from her father, a friend and chaplain of the Cardigan family.

=== Agricultural and horticultural interests ===
After moving to Haseley Hall, Sawyer became interested in farming and gardening. In 1894, he was elected as a member of the Warwickshire Chamber of Agriculture and, in 1899, served as chairman. He used his position to educate farmers about tuberculosis.

In 1899, he was instrumental in setting up the Haseley and District Pig Assurance Society and acted as president until 1916. In 1900, he was elected a member of the Sheepdown Sheep Society. He and his wife often attended the Birmingham Cattle Show.

In April 1893, he accepted the presidency of the Rowington, Hatton, and District Cottagers' Horticultural Society. The society twice held its annual show on his estate.

=== Business interests ===
In October 1885, Sawyer joined the board of the Birmingham Daily Times, a new Conservative newspaper for the Birmingham district.

In 1889 and 1890, he was the medical officer of the English and Scottish Law Life Assurance Association.

In 1902, Sawyer commissioned the construction of a house on Cornwall Street, Birmingham (now number 93, and Grade II* listed) to the design of the architects T W F Newton and Cheattle in the Arts and Crafts style.

In 1912, Sawyer sat on the British Re-insurance Company Limited's board of reference.

=== Sporting interests ===
While living at Edgbaston, he took riding lessons. In addition to being good for his health, it was an activity associated with the landed gentry.

He became adept at fencing and had a dial on his wall at Temple Row that he used for practice.

In 1898, he accepted the presidency of the Midland Counties' Amateur Gymnastic Association and was still in office in 1908.

== Family life in Birmingham ==
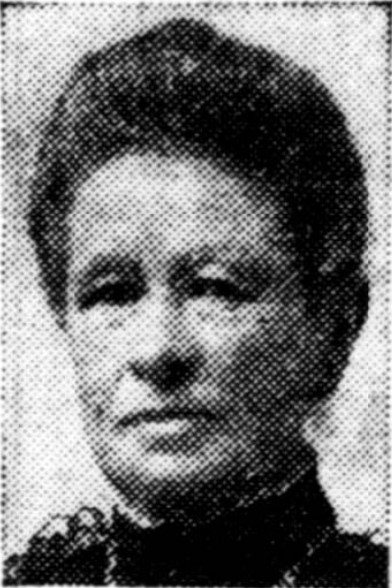
Lady Sawyer

On 13 May 1873, he married Adelaide Mary Hill, the daughter of Rev John Harwood Hill and his wife, Ann Maria Jiggins. Adelaide's father was the Rector of Cranoe in Leicestershire from 1837 to 1886, and her mother was the daughter of a Cambridge innkeeper.

Sawyer and his wife lived in the centre of Birmingham for about ten years, firstly at 92 Newhall Street and then at 22 Temple Row. By 1885, the family home was “Green Oaks,” Hagley Road, Edgbaston, where in July 1889, Lord and Lady Churchill stayed overnight and attended a garden party.

James used 22 Temple Row as his consulting room until 1889 and then 31 Temple Row.

The move to “Green Oaks” was prompted by the size of his household, which had increased to four children and four or five servants. Their children were James Edgar Hill, Maud, Amy, and Ralph Fitz James.

== Haseley Hall ==
In 1890, Sawyer bought the Haseley Hall Estate at Five Ways, Hatton, Warwickshire, and lived there for the rest of his life. The estate comprised Haseley Hall, a farmhouse, 199 acres, workers’ cottages, and outbuildings.

After waiting a year for the tenant to leave, Sawyer began altering and enlarging the house, engaging Messrs Wood and Kendrick of West Bromwich as architects and Thomas Rowbotham of Birmingham as builders. The work transformed the structure of 1840 into a Tudor-style mansion with an entrance hall and picture gallery. One of the internal features of the house was a magnificent oak staircase next to a stained glass window that bore Sawyer's coat of arms and the motto "Cherche et tu trouveras" ("Seek and thou shalt find"). The 1911 census records twenty-four rooms.

Sawyer also landscaped the grounds and improved the drainage system. Intent on impressing visitors, he gave special attention to the approach to the house, adding a lodge, bridge, lawns, and a long driveway.

By the summer of 1892, the work was complete. Sawyer and his family celebrated by holding a housewarming for more than a hundred villagers and friends.

The following year, they entertained two hundred Ladywood Conservatives at a garden party, using wagonettes to convey their guests from Hatton Station, a distance of two miles. They repeated the event every year up to 1907.

Sawyer loved the house. Soon after moving in, he created a homemade book called Haseley: an Idyll, which combined verse and watercolours. As well as being beautiful, he wanted the house to promote health and well-being. As part of this scheme, Sawyer had a medicinal garden where he grew all the English plants used in medicines and drugs.

While living at Haseley Hall, Sawyer and his family pursued an aristocratic lifestyle. They celebrated the coming of age of their eldest son with a ball and garden party, and they presented their two daughters at court. They also hosted an annual summer party for villagers and an annual Christmas party for tenants and members of their household. ( A sketch writer of 1899 poked fun at Sawyer's noble pretensions, portraying him as an interloper who lived in "the home of someone else's ancestors and revived "quaint old customs of feudal days."

The house required a large staff. In April 1911, six female servants lived in the house, a butler lived in the lodge, and a coachman occupied one of the cottages. In 1918, the coachman's call up for military service precipitated a crisis for his employers. Lady Sawyer depended on him to get about, and male servants were in short supply. Shortly afterward, Sawyer and his wife decided to sell the estate.

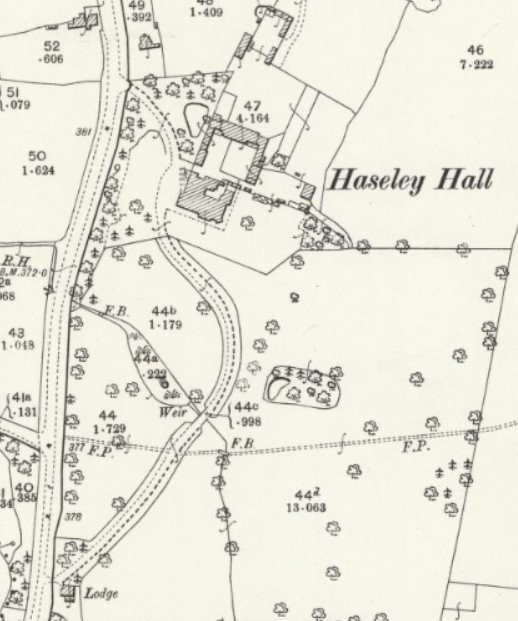
Map of Haseley Hall and grounds in 1903 (reproduced with the permission of the National Library of Scotland).

On 19 July 1918, they offered it for sale by auction in six lots. At the auction, they sold five lots (six cottages and some land), but lot 1 (Haseley Hall and the Hall Farm) failed to reach the reserve price.

After Sawyer's death, his executors sold the house to a Birmingham company, W and T Avery, to use as a club for their employees.

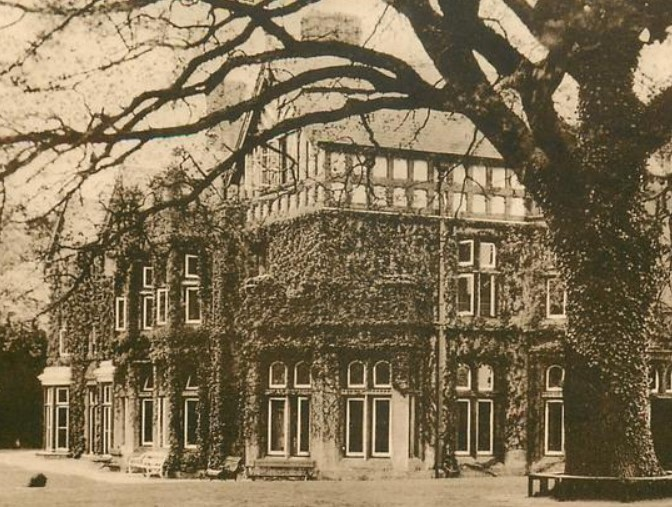
Haseley Hall

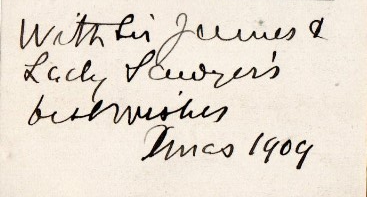
Sir James and Lady Sawyer's Christmas Postcard of 1909

== Final years ==
Sawyer's ceaseless activity eventually took its toll when close to his seventieth birthday, he fell seriously ill and never fully recovered.

His family kept the details of his illness out of the public domain. However, it was chronic and debilitating. His last public appearance was on 26 July 1913, and he then disappeared from the newspapers until March 1914, when some reported that he was recovering from a recent illness. A few weeks later, his wife felt compelled to retire as ruling councillor of the Ladywood Habitation of the Primrose League, a position she had held for over a quarter of a century. Sawyer died at Haseley Hall on 27 January 1919, aged 74.

When his body was laid to rest at Haseley Church three days later, few people attended because of his long absence from public life and the icy conditions.

He left an estate with a gross value of £41,310. He left his wife a legacy of £5,000 and put the residue in trust for his wife for life and then for his children.

His widow moved to Newark-on-Trent to be close to her daughter Maud, later following her to Burwash, where she died in 1934, aged 84. She lies in Haseley's churchyard with her husband.

== Publications ==
- A Guide to the Physical Diagnosis of the Diseases of the Lungs and Heart (1870)
- Contributions to Practical Medicine (1886, 1912)
- Coprostasis: Its Causes, Prevention and Treatment (1912)
- Insomnia: Its Causes and Treatment (1912)
- Notes on Medical Education

== See also ==
- G. Cooke Adams
- Ernest H. Tipper

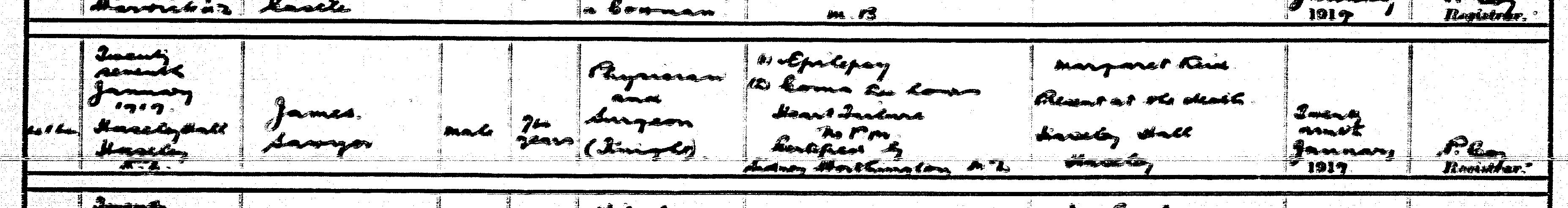
A digital image of James Sawyer's death certificate.
