= Ateliosis =

Early-1900s term for proportional dwarfism

Ateliosis or ateleiosis is a diagnosis used in the early 1900s to describe patients with short stature. Ateliosis literally means "failure to achieve perfection", and was used to describe proportional dwarfism. The term was popularised by Hastings Gilford, who used the term to refer to forms of dwarfism associated with and without sexual maturation.

Ateliosis was reported as early as 1904 in relation to progeria, a syndrome of premature aging.

According to the Merriam-Webster Dictionary, it is "dwarfism associated with anterior pituitary deficiencies and marked by essentially normal intelligence and proportions though often retarded sexual development". The physical characteristics include: normal facial features, childlike high pitched voice, proportioned body, and abnormal genitalia. Their mental development is normal to slightly delayed. Hastings Gilford originated the term to describe patients with "continuous youth".
