= G. Cooke Adams =

Australian physician and cancer researcher

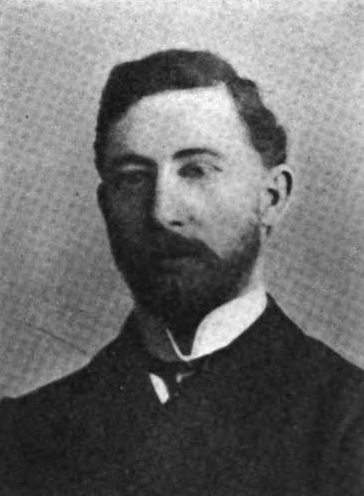
- Born: 1865; Sydney
- Died: 23 June 1934 (aged 68–69)
- Occupation: Physician

George Cooke Adams (1865 – 23 June 1934) was an Australian physician and cancer researcher who proposed the Mulyptol treatment for cancer.

== Biography ==
Adams was born in Sydney. At age fifteen he worked as a city engineer in Sydney for the Municipal Council for 5 years.

He studied medicine at New South Wales College of Pharmacy and obtained his MD from Queen's University at Kingston in Canada. In 1892 he was awarded the Scottish Triple Qualification, allowing him to practise medicine in the United Kingdom. He was an honorary surgeon to the Australian Navy and worked as a family physician for Sir Edmund Barton, former Prime Minister of Australia. At the invitation of Sir Edmund he sat in the House of Commons when the federation bill passed its final reading.

Adams moved to the United States where he conducted cancer research. He married Julie Cooke Adams, first National President of Daughters of the British Empire. His son Archibald Emmett Adams was a composer.

== Cancer research ==
Adams reported that the death rate from cancer of British born citizens in Australia is nearly double compared to those born in Australia and that cancer is almost unknown amongst the Aborigines. He argued that "cancer is not due to bacterial or parasitic origin, but is a constitutional disease due to a specific or malignant virus originating in the blood". He stated that the virus is driven by an unknown chemical constituent termed "malignic acid" which originates under certain climatic, dietetic and hygienic conditions. He held that cancer is preventable and the main dietetic factors are excessive alcohol, meat and sugar consumption and the principal hygienic factors are non-native trees whose decomposed foliage contaminate drainage and water supply.

Adams stated that indigenous foliage from conifers, laurels and the myrtle family improve sanitation and render native-born populations of countries where they grow almost immune from cancer. He argued that the Australian eucalyptus are most beneficial to prevent and treat cancer. He patented and promoted "Mulyptol", a eucalyptus oil by means of scientific preparation which was mixed with olive oil as a dressing and emulsion. In 1905, Adams used Mulyptol to treat 55 cases of breast and uterus cancer.

In 1907, Adams conducted a two-year study of cancer in Chicago for the Chicago Board of Health. He came to the conclusion that excessive meat eating, especially from diseased animals is a cause of cancer. Adams reported that the highest cancer mortality was among foreign born Chicago residents such as German, Irish and Slavs whilst Chicago born residents, Italians and Chinese had the lowest mortality.

== Selected publications ==
- Cancer in Australia (The Lancet, 1904)
- Notes on the Etiology of Cancer (The Chicago Clinic, 1907)
- Why Great Britain Declared War (Chicago, 1914)

== See also ==
- James Sawyer
- Ernest H. Tipper
