= Wroxall Priory =

Medieval monastic house in Wroxall, Warwickshire, England

Coordinates: 52.3341°N 1.6758°W

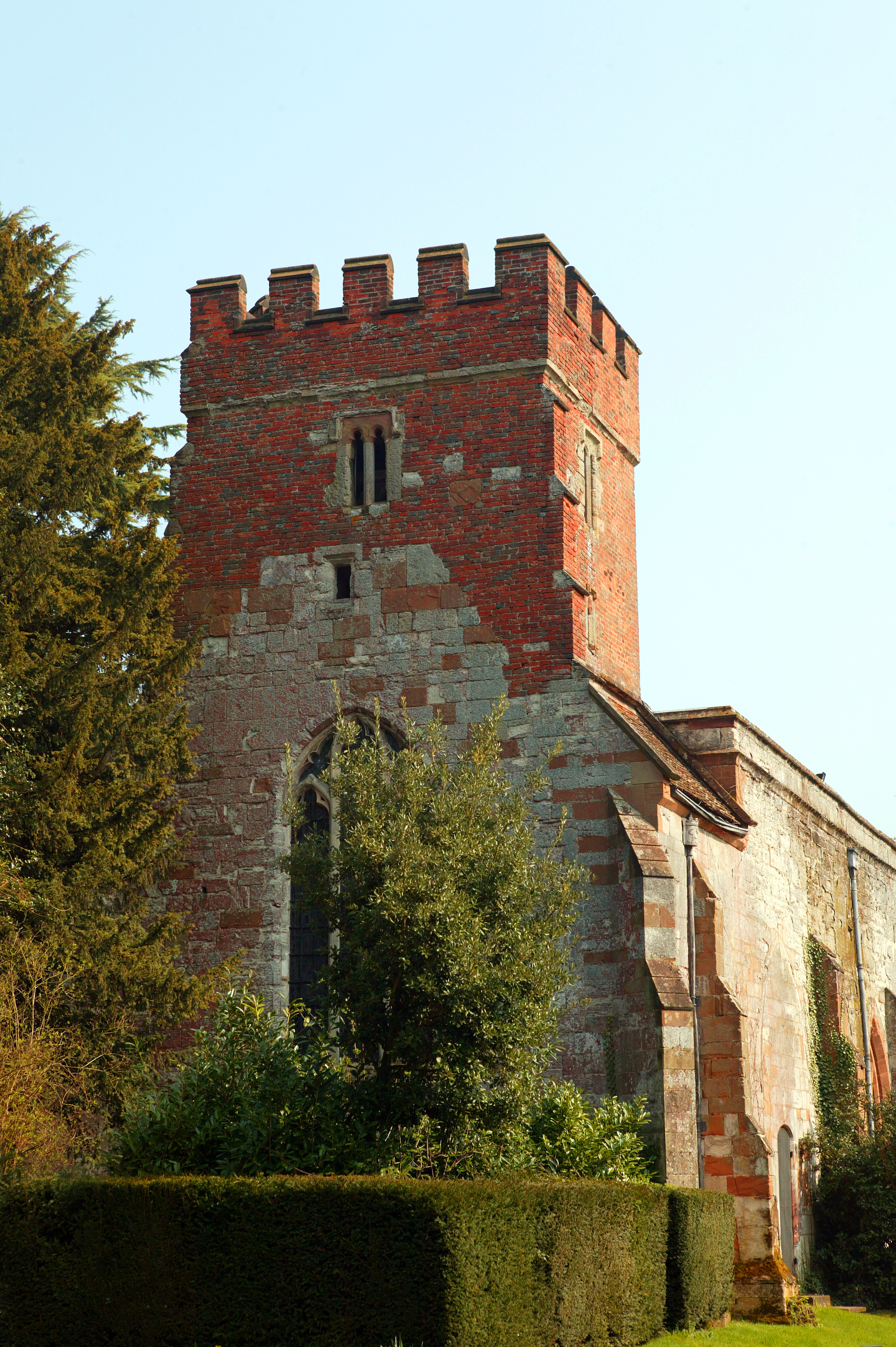
The priory Church of St Leonard (Wren's Chapel)

Wroxall Priory was a medieval monastic house in Wroxall, Warwickshire, England.

It was founded c.1135 by Hugh, Lord of Hatton and Wroxall in thanks for his release from seven years' imprisonment in Jerusalem during the Crusades. After reputedly having a vision of St. Leonard, the patron saint of prisoners, he so appreciated the intervention of the saint that he gave 3,000 acres of land to the church in Wroxall to form a monastery for nuns of the Order of St. Benedict which was named the Priory of St. Leonard at Wroxall.

A list of the Prioresses up to 1535 and further list of ministers from 1538 circa to the present can be found on the official website. A Charter issued by Pope Alexander III to the Priory of St. Leonard will also be found on the same web site. Along with all the religious houses of England, the house was dissolved in 1536 by Henry VIII.

The Priory Chapel survives intact as St Leonard's Church and is a Grade I listed building. It is popularly known as Wren's chapel after Sir Christopher Wren bought the priory estate and is now a cathedral of the Free Methodist Church. It contains the figurine of Prioress Isabella Shakespeare, (aunt of William Shakespeare), and the tomb of Sir Christopher Wren's wife.

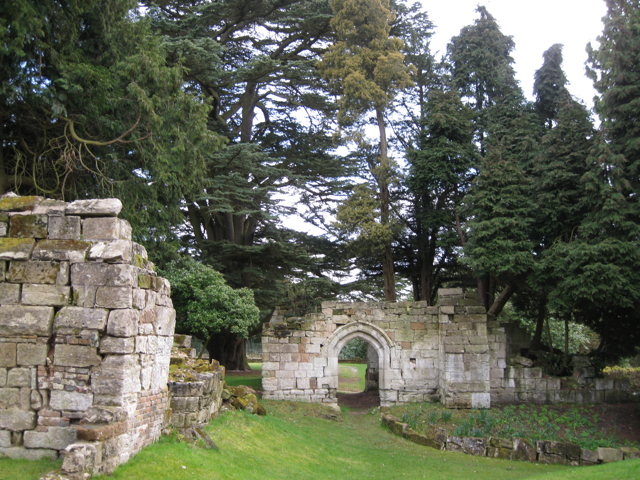
Ruins of priory cloisters

The ruined remains of the rest of the priory buildings are Grade II* listed.

The priory site is now occupied by Wroxall Abbey, a large Victorian house built by James Dugdale, High Sheriff of Warwickshire for 1868–69. It was occupied as a girls' school from 1936 to 1995 but has since been owned by the Quinn family and converted into a hotel. The legend of Sir Hugh is featured in stained glass within the house.
