= Beausale, Haseley, Honiley and Wroxall =

Civil parish in Warwickshire, England

Coordinates: 52.33°N 1.65°W

Beausale, Haseley, Honiley and Wroxall is a civil parish in the Warwick District of Warwickshire, England. It was created in 2007 by the merger of the former civil parishes of Beausale, Haseley, Honiley and Wroxall. At the 2001 Census it had a population of 565, increasing to 623 at the time of the 2011 Census. Haseley Manor, a Grade II-listed country house sits in the parish.
