= Wren's Cathedral =

Church in Warwickshire, England

- St Leonard's Church, Wroxall
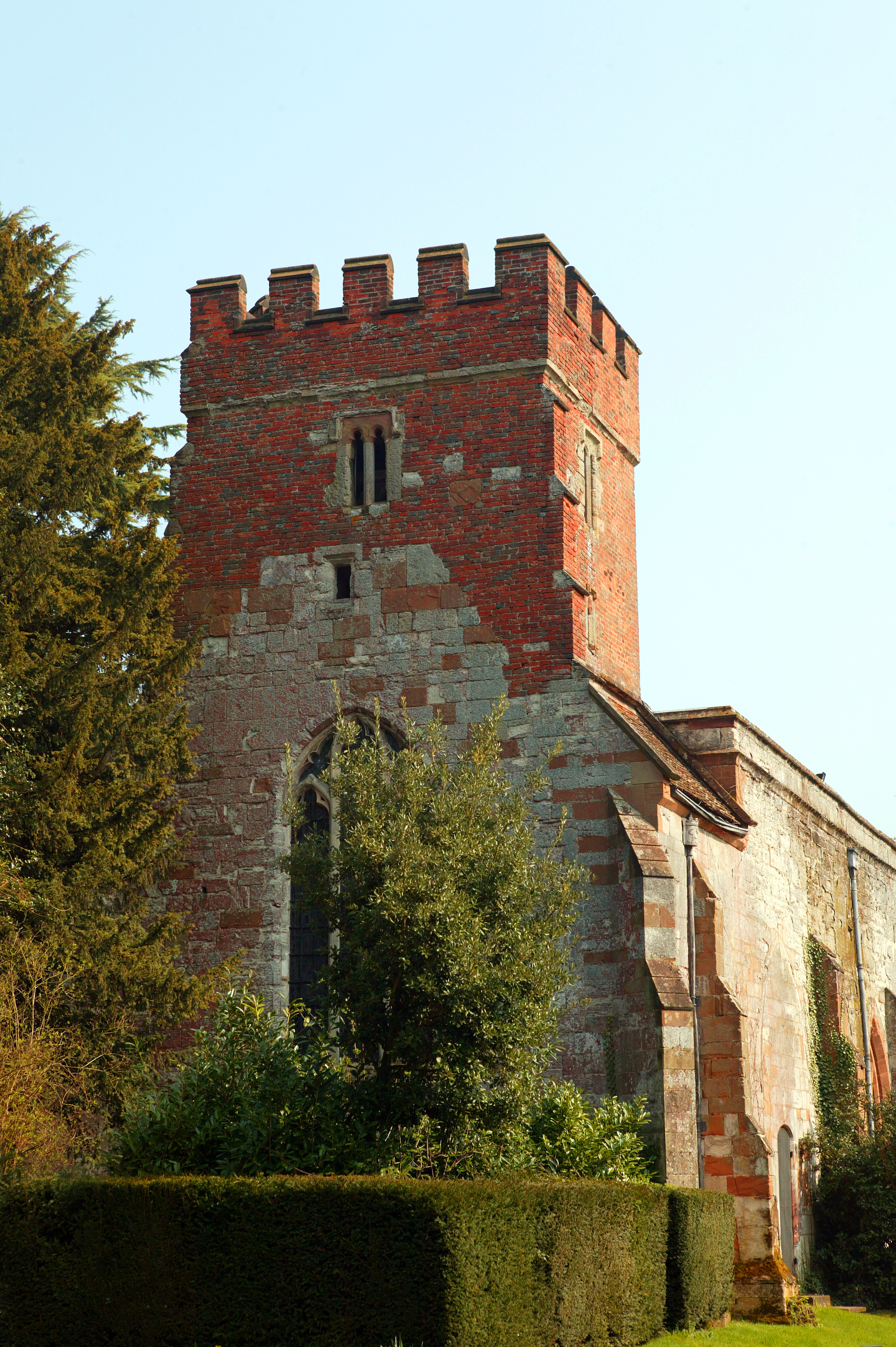
- Interactive map of Wren's Cathedral
- Location: Wroxall Abbey, Wroxall, Warwickshire, England
- Coordinates: 52.3342°N 1.6758°W

Listed Building – Grade I
- Official name: Church of St Leonard
- Designated: 11 April 1967
- Reference no.: 1035066

Wren's Cathedral, properly the Church of St Leonard and now a cathedral of the Order of St Leonard, was originally the Lady Chapel of Wroxall Priory.

Wroxall Priory was founded in 1141 as the Priory of St. Leonard for nuns at Wroxall, Warwickshire by Sir Hugh-Hatton, eldest son of the Earl of Warwick. He fought in the Crusades and was released after being held prisoner for seven years in Jerusalem and having a vision of St. Leonard, the patron saint of prisoners. He so appreciated the intervention of the saint that he gave 3,000 acres of land to the church in Wroxall to form a monastery for nuns after the Order of St. Benedict which was named the Priory of St. Leonard at Wroxall.

A list of the Prioresses up to 1535 and further list of ministers from 1538 circa to the present can be found on the official website. A Charter issued by Pope Alexander III to the Priory of St. Leonard will also be found on the same web site.

== History ==
With the separation of the Church from Rome in 1535, Henry VIII allowed Robert Burgoyne to purchase the estate for just under £600 after he had demolished the Monastery and Church adjacent to the present Wren's Cathedral. With the rubble he built an Elizabethan house. The Lady Chapel was kept and designated St. Leonard Parish Church of Wroxall (Church of England). Some of the ruins of the larger Church and traces of the Priory can be seen across the present driveway. Chaplains (ministers) were appointed by the owner of the Estate from about 1538c. The estate at this time also took the title of Abbey i.e. Wroxall Abbey. The red brick tower and three bells in the church date from 1663–1664.

Richard Shakespeare, the grandfather of William Shakespeare, was bailiff for the church in 1534, according to Michael Wood in his documentary In Search of Shakespeare (2003). One of the Prioresses, Isabella (1501), was William Shakespeare's great-aunt. Joan Shakespeare (1524) was his aunt.

In 1713, Sir Christopher Wren purchased the estate as his country residence. While he is buried at St Paul's Cathedral, his wife and family are buried at Wroxall. His coat of arms is displayed on the south side of the present cathedral. In 1861 the Dugdale family purchased the estate and had the present Mansion House built after demolishing the previous house. The church was also internally renovated by the architect who designed the house. His name was Ryland. He later wrote a History of Wroxall Abbey (1903). Much of the information contained here is described in this publication. A girls' school, the Wroxall Abbey Girls School, was founded in the Mansion House in 1936, when the proprietors of the School leased 27 acres of the property, including the church. Ministers continued to be appointed during this period. The school closed together with the church in 1995.

== Present use ==
In 2001 the church was re-opened by the new owners and a large Free Methodist Church, the Renewal Christian Centre in Solihull agreed to provide the ministry. The church was renamed Wren's Chapel in honour of its former illustrious owner. Regular Sunday services were commenced, and marriages, wedding blessings, child dedications and funerals were conducted by two designated ministers.

In 2009 the Communion of Evangelical Episcopal Churches (CEEC) were wishing to establish a fellowship diocese in the United Kingdom and based its headquarters in Wroxall Abbey. The ministers at the Abbey were re-consecrated into the CEEC, and later that year a bishop was appointed to oversee the diocese.

At the same time the Order of St Leonard (OSL) was established with the aim of bringing together laity and ordained ministers from all over the world. The order has in two years developed into several countries in Europe and Africa so that an Archdiocese of Wroxall Abbey has now been established at Wroxall.
