= 23 Oakhill Road =

Coordinates: 51.459369°N 0.205955°W

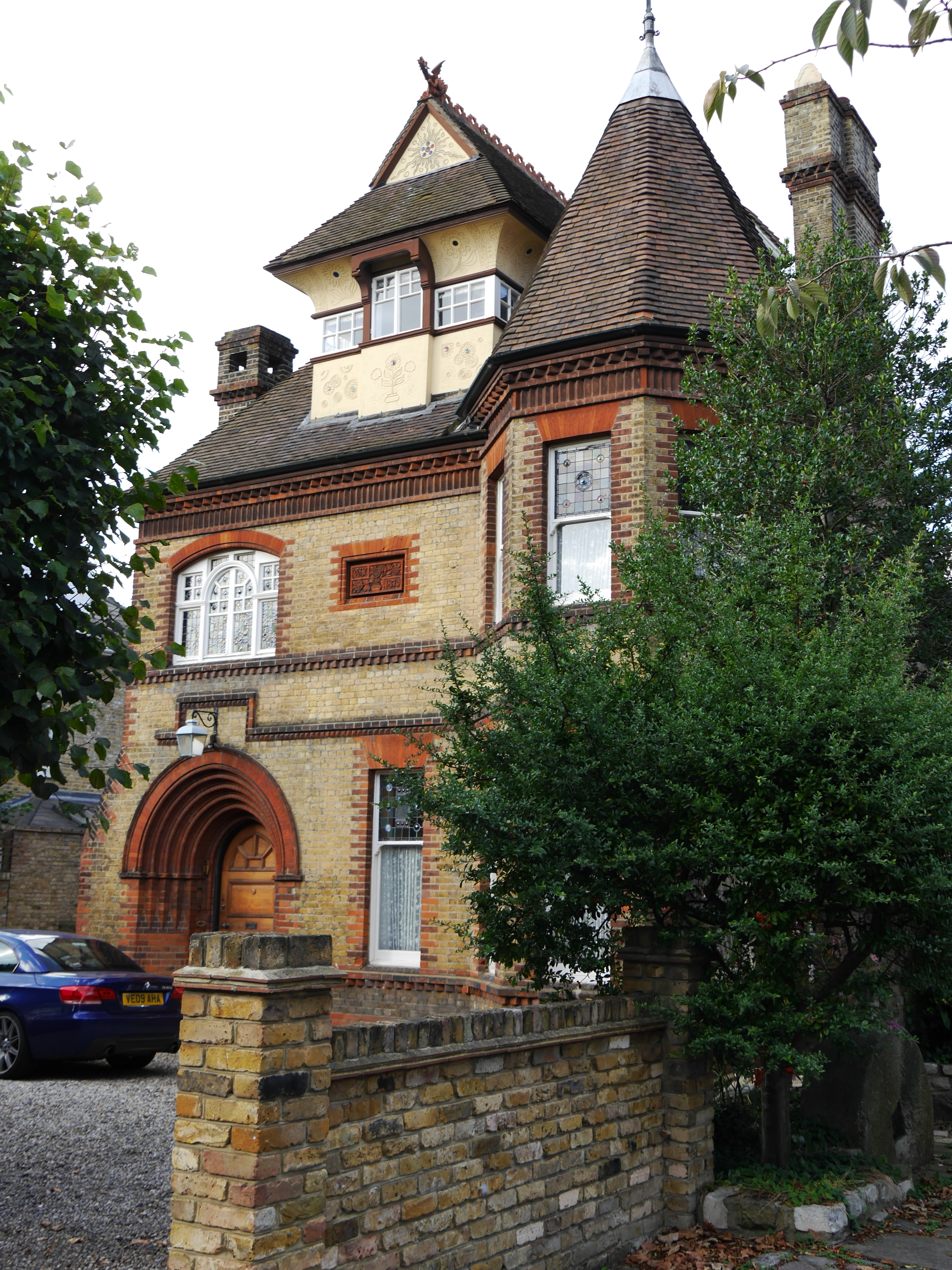
23 Oakhill Road

23 Oakhill Road is a Grade II listed house in Oakhill Road, Putney, London SW15.

It was built in 1879, by the architect William Young, as his own house. He died at 23 Oakhill Road in 1900.

== See also ==
- 25 Oakhill Road
