= J. Ellis Barker =

British homeopath and writer (1870–1948)

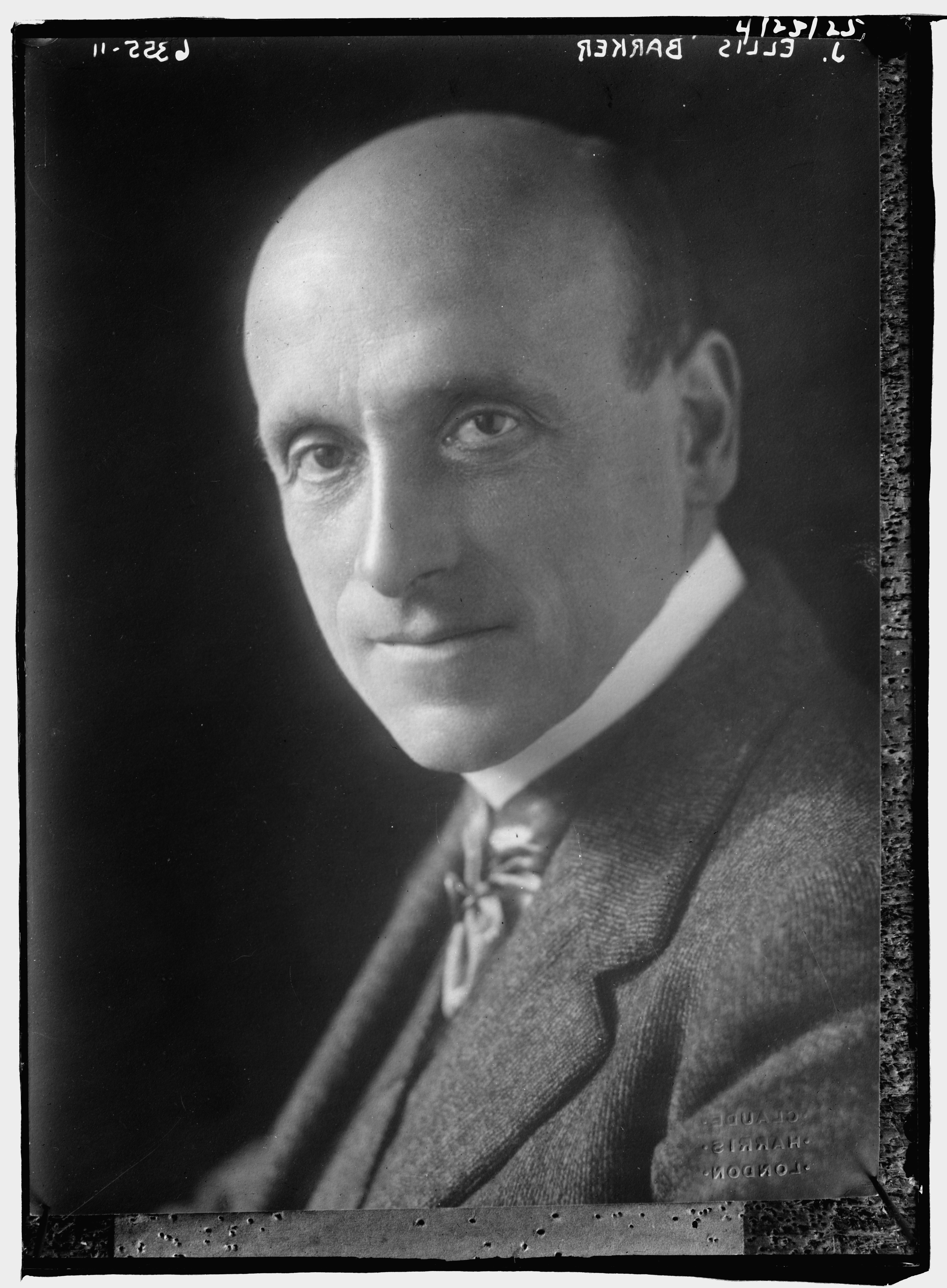
- Born: 9 May 1870; Cologne
- Died: 16 July 1948 (aged 78)
- Occupations: Homeopath, writer

James Ellis Barker (9 May 1870 – 16 July 1948) was a British historian, journalist, homeopath and naturopath. Barker was also an alternative cancer treatment advocate who promoted the idea that cancer is caused by autointoxication from chronic poisoning and vitamin starvation.

== Biography ==
Barker was born in Cologne as Otto Julius Eltzbacher and was naturalised as a British citizen in 1900. Barker wrote on politics warning Britain about the danger of conflict with the Kaiser's Germany and advocated free trade. He attempted to conceal his German Jewish origins. Barker was taught homeopathy by John Henry Clarke an anti-Semite. Barker became an influential British homeopath and took over the editorship of The Homeopathic World from Clarke in 1932. He renamed the magazine Heal Thyself which he co-edited with his wife, Eileen Homer. He was Honorary Secretary of the New Health Society.

== Cancer research ==
At age thirty, Barker suffered from constipation. He believed he was in a state similar to that of a man about to develop cancer so he began to study food, improve his diet and exercise. He eliminated his constipation and came to the conclusion that he had prevented the occurrence of cancer in himself, so his system of dieting and exercise would prevent cancer in others. He argued that cancer was caused by autointoxication from chronic poisoning and vitamin starvation. Barker was influenced by the research of Sir William Arbuthnot Lane.

Barker commented that cancer stemmed from "autointoxication of the bowel. Apparently civilization and constipation go hand in hand." He stated that constipation is caused by the overuse of food preservatives, stress and the lack of "natural foods" in the diet. Barker opposed the use of toilet seats and promoted squatting which would assist bowel movements.

In 1924, Barker authored the book Cancer: How It Is Caused; How It Can Be Prevented, which ran to more than 400 pages. Barker stated that cancer is a disease of civilization and rarely occurs amongst primitive tribes or uncivilised nations due to their lack of intestinal stasis. He argued that cancer is caused by "chronic poisoning" from the bowels. Barker recommended a high-fibre diet of raw fruit, salads and wholemeal bread, cheese and eggs, with plenty of exercise. He campaigned for the consumption of raw vegetables and undried meats. In his book, Barker did not oppose the consumption of alcohol, coffee, tea or tobacco. However, in other publications he advised against coffee and tea as heat "acts as a cancer poison".

The book was negatively reviewed in medical journals for not providing reliable evidence for its claims. A review in the Journal of Cancer Research suggested that the "publication of such a book does a great deal of harm because it misleads those who have no real knowledge and encourages charlatanry, of which there is already too much." A review in the Nature journal commented that "In our opinion the book will do much more harm than good, as it can only have a deleterious action and make people concern themselves with morbid symptoms in their abdomens." A review in the Journal of the American Medical Association concluded that the book is a "pernicious and harmful piece of literature". George Soper suggested that the book is overloaded with long quotations from Sir William Arbuthnot Lane and concluded that Barker "cannot be said to have advanced the subject of cancer control in any way".

== Selected publications ==
- British Socialism: An Examination of its Doctrines, Policy, Aims and Practical Proposals (1908)
- 101 Points Against Free Trade (1909)
- Great and Greater Britain (1910)
- Economic Statesmanship (1918)
- Modern Germany: Its Rise, Growth, Downfall, and Future (1919)
- Cancer: How It Is Caused; How It Can Be Prevented (With an Introduction by Sir William Arbuthnot Lane, 1924)
- America's Secret: The Causes of Her Economic Success (1927)
- Good Health and Happiness (1927)
- Miracles of Healing and How They are Done: A New Path to Health (1931)
- Cancer: The Surgeon and the Researcher (With an Introduction by Sir William Arbuthnot Lane, 1932)
- My Testament of Healing (1939)
- New Lives for Old: How to Cure the Incurable (With an Introduction by Sir Herbert Barker, 1949)

== Quotes ==
I have endeavoured to show by an overwhelming mass of facts that cancer is caused by chronic poisoning and vitamine starvation, that it is largely due to dietetic mistakes, and especially to the consumption of concentrated, manipulated, de-vitaminised and de-mineralised foodstuffs, that it is a disease of civilisation and over-civilisation.

— J. Ellis Barker, in 1924

== See also ==
- Hastings Gilford
- Ernest H. Tipper
