= Haseley =

Village in Warwickshire, England

Coordinates: 52.308803°N 1.663660°W

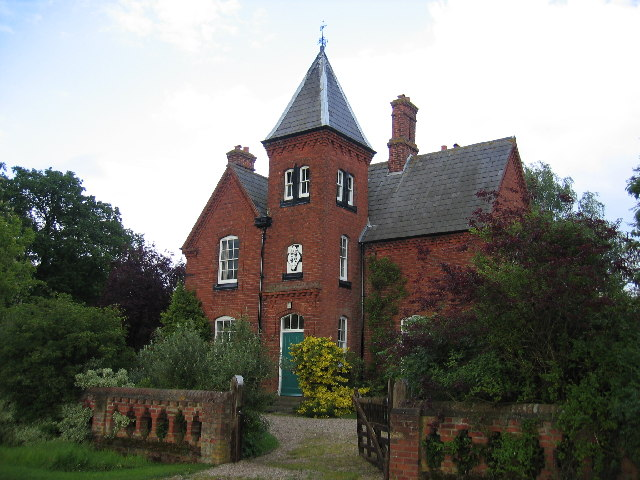
- A house in Haseley Green

- Location within Warwickshire
- Population: 207 (2001 census)
- OS grid reference: SP2332867653
- Civil parish: Beausale, Haseley, Honiley and Wroxall
- District: Warwick
- Shire county: Warwickshire
- Region: West Midlands
- Country: England
- Sovereign state: United Kingdom
- Post town: WARWICK
- Postcode district: CV35
- Dialling code: 01926
- Police: Warwickshire
- Fire: Warwickshire
- Ambulance: West Midlands
- UK Parliament: Warwick and Leamington

Haseley is a village in the Warwick district, in Warwickshire, England. It is four miles north-west of the county town of Warwick and nine miles (14 km) south-east of Solihull, now in the parish of Beausale, Haseley, Honiley and Wroxall, created on 1 April 2007. The village is on the A4177 and, as it is only five miles (8.0 km) from the M40 motorway, is easily accessible. Haseley proper, along with Haseley Knob, Haseley Green and Waste Green, consists mainly of detached houses spread over a large area, giving the parish a very low housing density. The 2001 census recorded 207 residents living in 92 dwellings. Due to its relative affluence and proximity to the tourist towns of Warwick and Stratford upon Avon, several large and highly rated hotels are situated around the village.

Haseley Manor, a Grade II-listed country house, formerly the staff college for the British Motor Corporation and its nationalised successor British Leyland, now consists of luxury apartments. The parish church, St Mary's, is medieval in origin and revealed evidence of its original decoration during restoration work some years ago.

== Haseley Hall ==
Haseley Hall was the home of Sir James Sawyer from 1890 to 1919. After his death, his executors sold the house to a Birmingham company, W and T Avery, to use as a club for their employees. Eventually finding the house too far from Birmingham, the company sold it in 1927 to Warwick Corporation for £6,350 (£4,000 less than the council's finance committee had expected to pay). The Corporation wanted the estate because the Warwick water works lay within its bounds. They had no interest in the house, which they considered demolishing. However, in 1929, they leased it to a charity to use as a children's convalescent home. In 1975, the Severn-Trent Water Authority sold the house to the Leamington Housing Association, which turned it into thirteen flats. In 1994, the association offered the house for sale at a guide price of £200,000. The buyer turned it into seventeen luxury apartments.

== Notable people ==
Job Throckmorton (1545–1601), a Puritan campaigner, lived at Haseley. In June 1589, he and John Penry installed a printing press in his house to print three "Marprelate tracts" attacking the episcopacy.

Sir James Sawyer lived at Haseley Hall from 1891 to 1919.
