= Wroxall Abbey =

Building in Wroxall, Warwickshire, England

Coordinates: 52.3340°N 1.6764°W

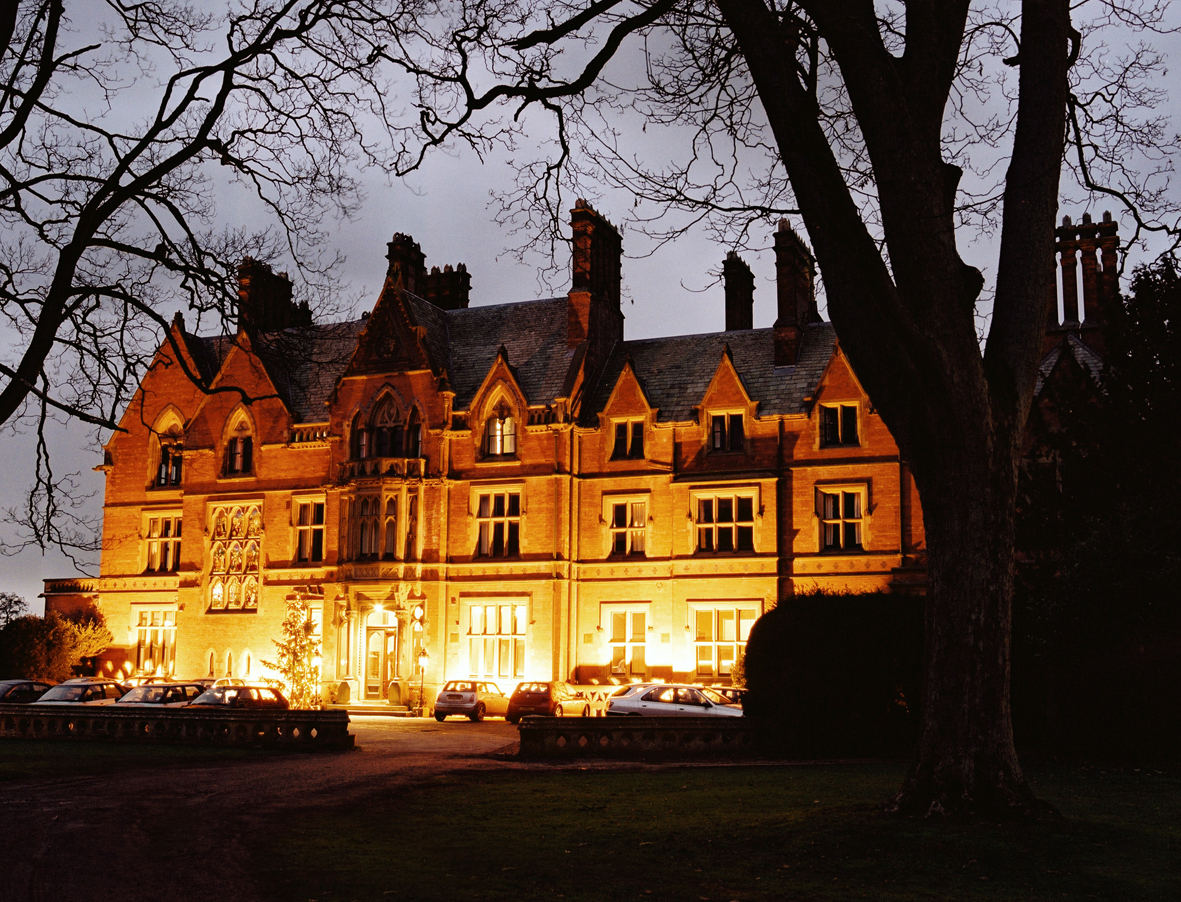
Wroxall Abbey at night

Wroxall Abbey is a substantial Victorian mansion house situated at Wroxall, Warwickshire which was converted for use as a hotel, spa, wedding venue and conference centre. It is a Grade II listed building.

== History ==
Built in 1141 by Sir Hugh de Hatton, the estate was occupied for some 400 years by Wroxall Priory, a Benedictine monastery of nuns, until the Dissolution of the Monasteries by Henry VIII in 1536.

In 1544 the King granted the estate to Robert Burgoyne of Sutton, Bedfordshire(d 1545) who had been one of the King's Commissioners for the Dissolution. His son Robert (d 1613), High Sheriff of Warwickshire in 1597, built a manor house in Elizabethan style adjacent to the priory ruins.

The Burgoyne family (later Burgoyne baronets) occupied the manor until 1713 when they sold it together with 1,850 acres (7.5 km^{2}), to Sir Christopher Wren.

Wren used the house as his country retreat, and it was occupied from time to time by members of his family, including his great-great-grandson Christopher Roberts Wren, High Sheriff of Warwickshire in 1820. Later descendants sold the estate in 1861 to James Dugdale, High Sheriff of Warwickshire 1868, who demolished the old manor house and replaced it with an imposing mansion, thereafter to be known as Wroxall Abbey, in the Victorian Gothic style.

The Lady Chapel adjacent to the Hall, now a church dedicated to St Leonard, and popularly known as Wren's Cathedral, is a Grade I listed building. It is a cathedral of the Free Methodist Church and is used for regular services and weddings. The nearby ruins of the 12th century abbey are Grade II* listed.

The house was let and was occupied as a girls' school from 1936 to 1995. In 1995 the estate was purchased by the Quinn family, who leased it to a commercial company in 2001. The lessees converted the estate into a hotel.

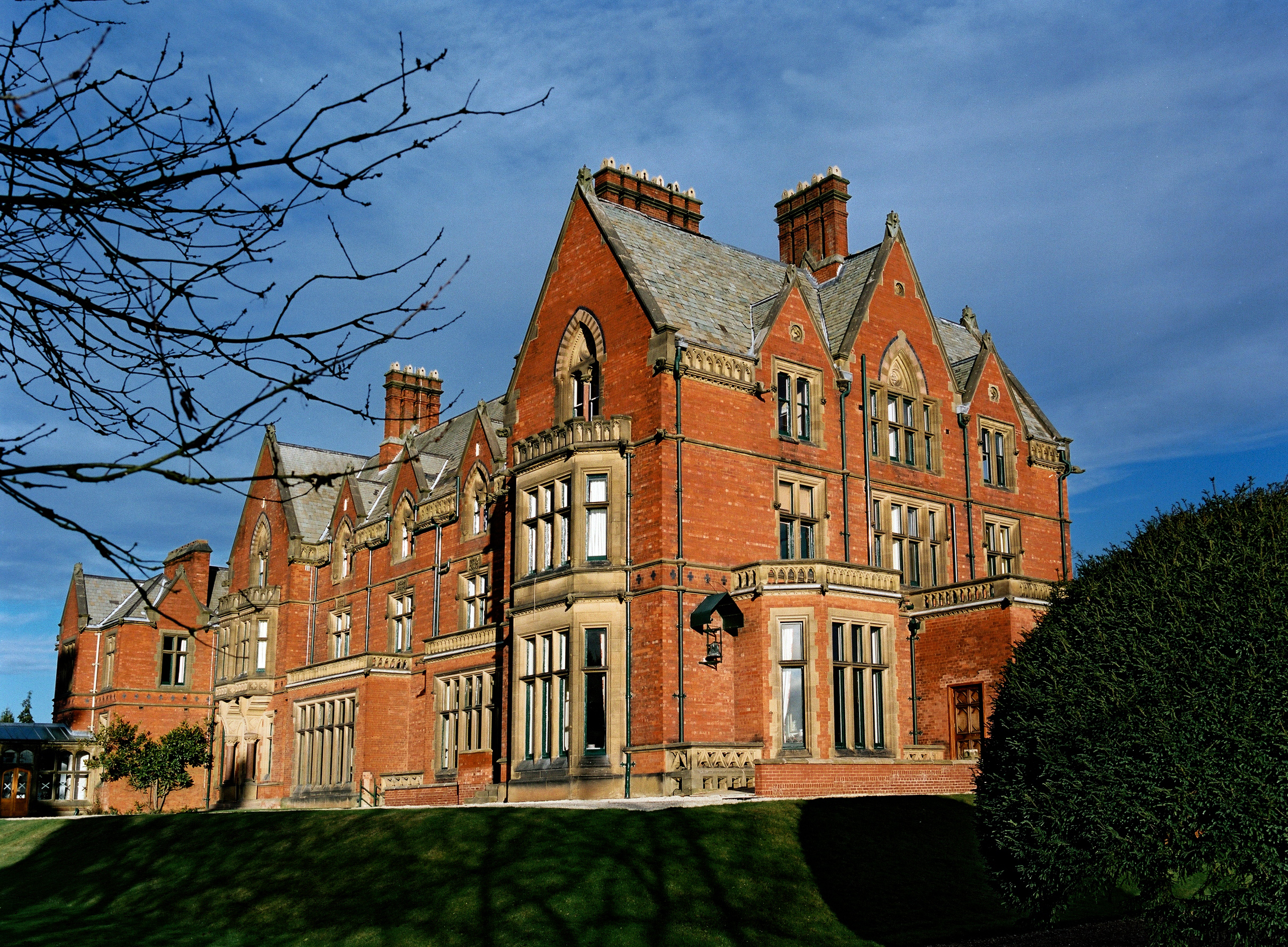
Mansion rear

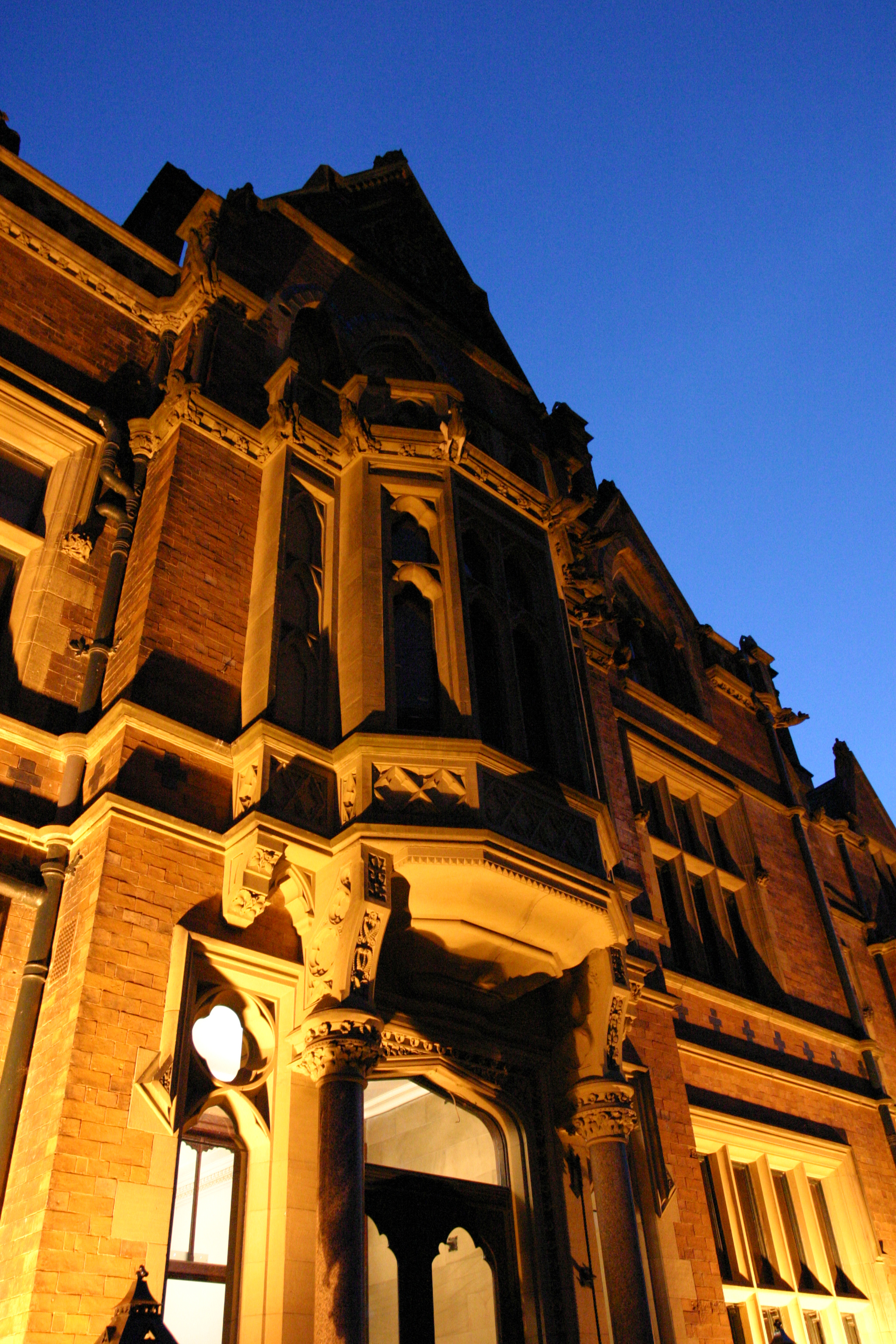
Wroxall Abbey Entrance

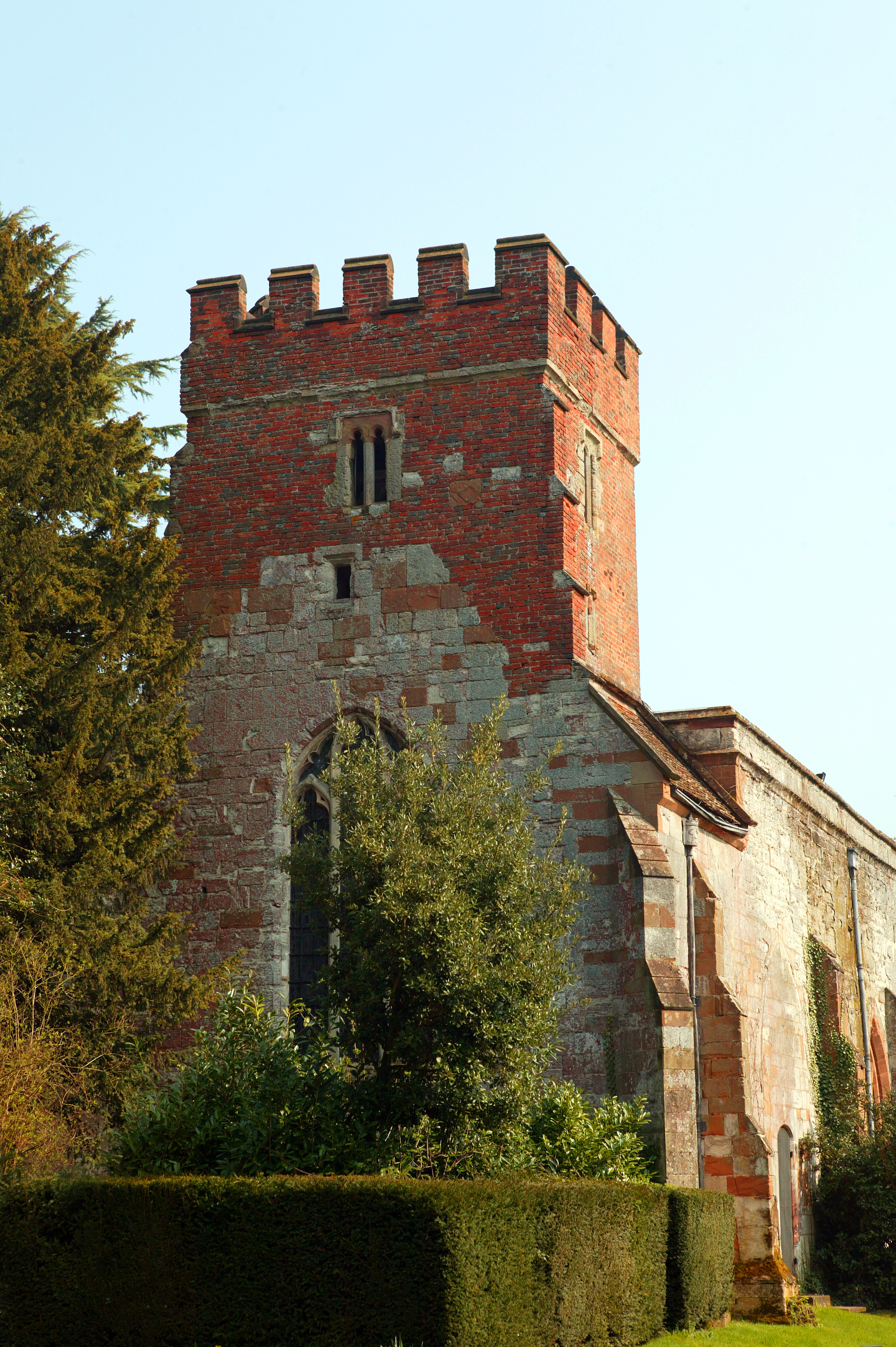
Wren's Cathedral

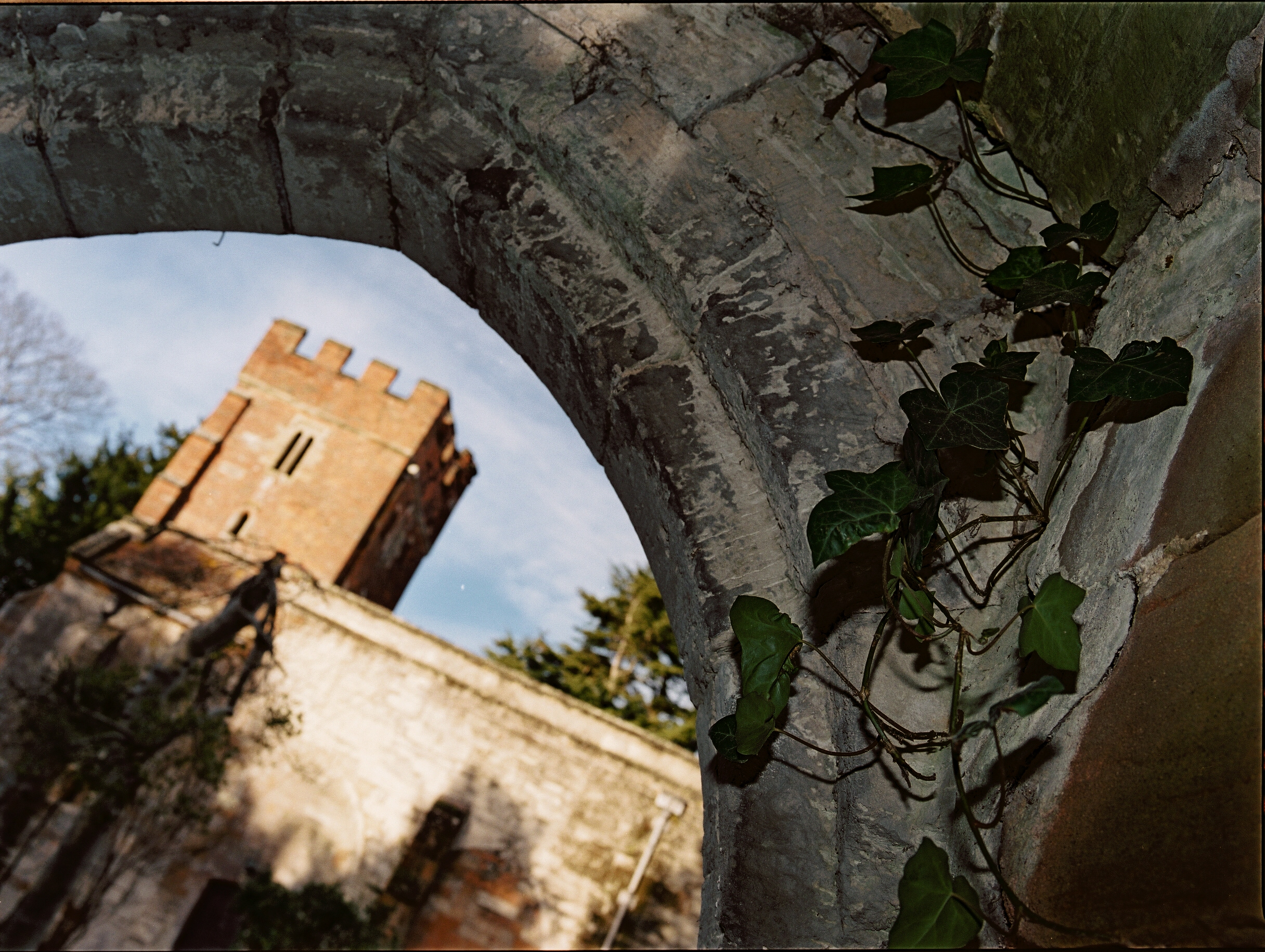
Wren's Cathedral

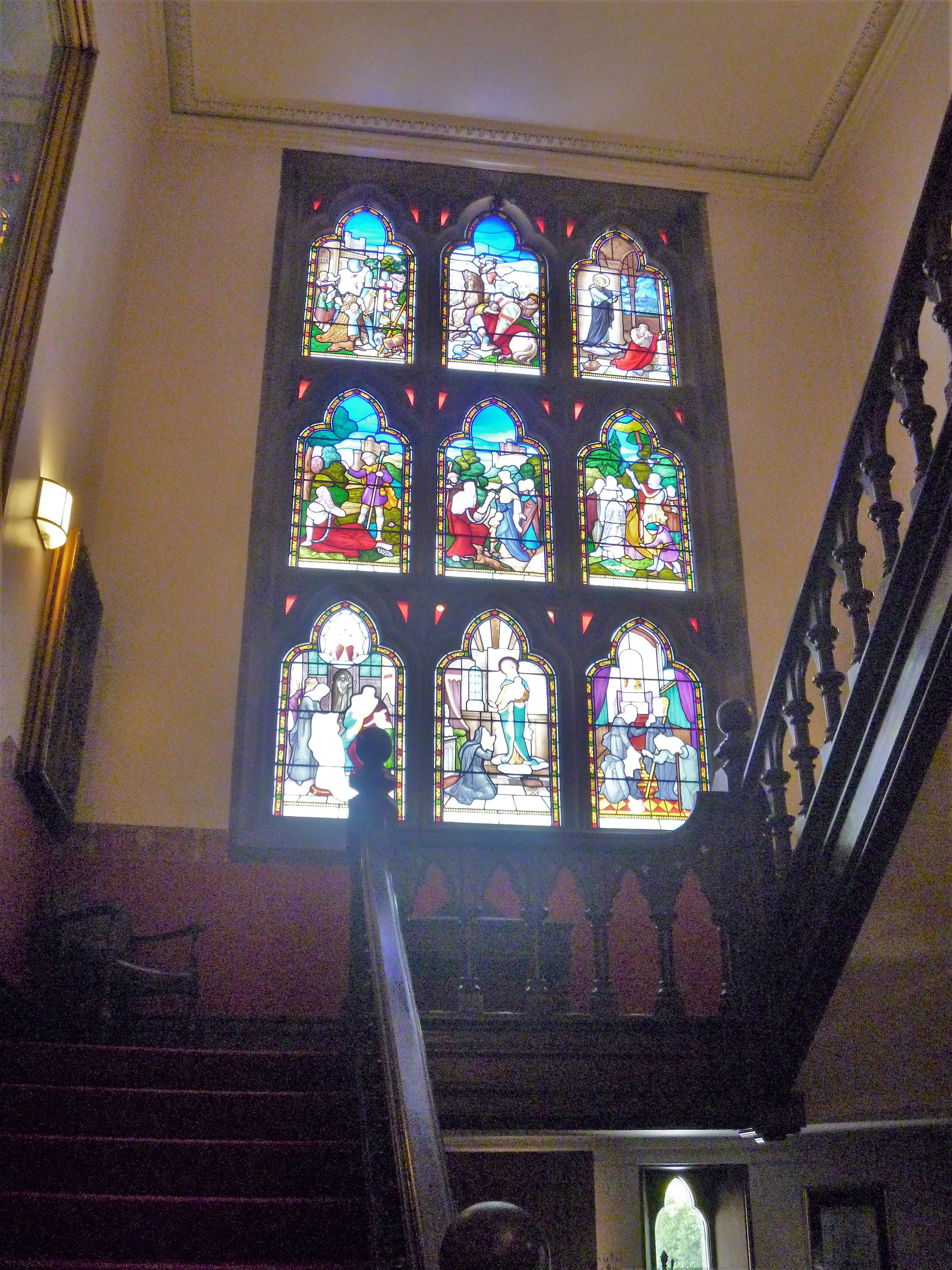
Stairs and stained glass
