= Old Castle Bridge =

Bridge in Warwick, England

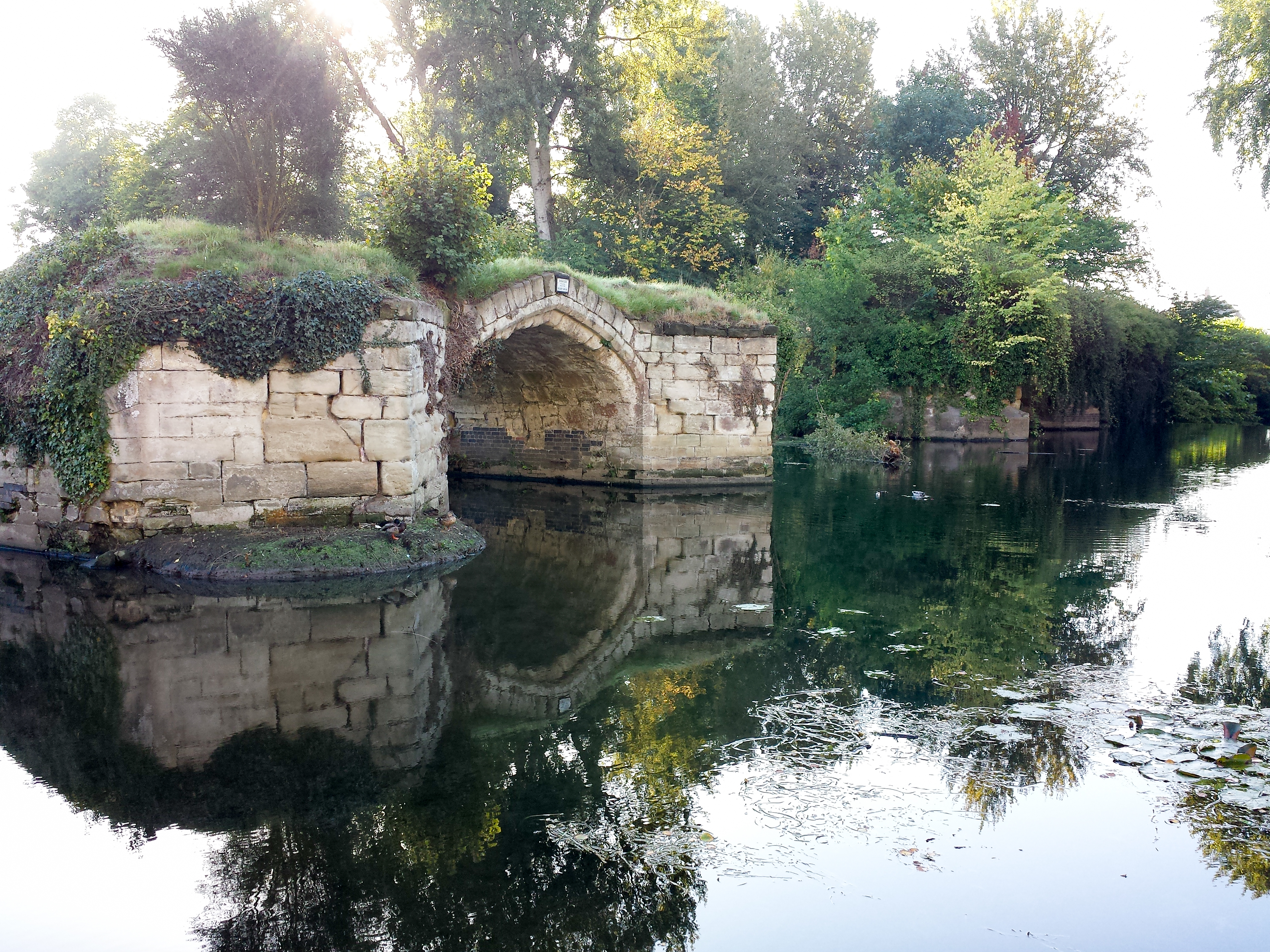
- Interactive map of Old Castle Bridge
- 52.279214°N 1.583308°W
- Location: Warwick, Warwickshire, England

Listed Building – Grade II*
- Official name: Remains of Old Castle Bridge
- Designated: 10 January 1953
- Reference no.: 1035499

Scheduled monument
- Official name: Warwick Castle Old Bridge (remains of)
- Reference no.: 1005772

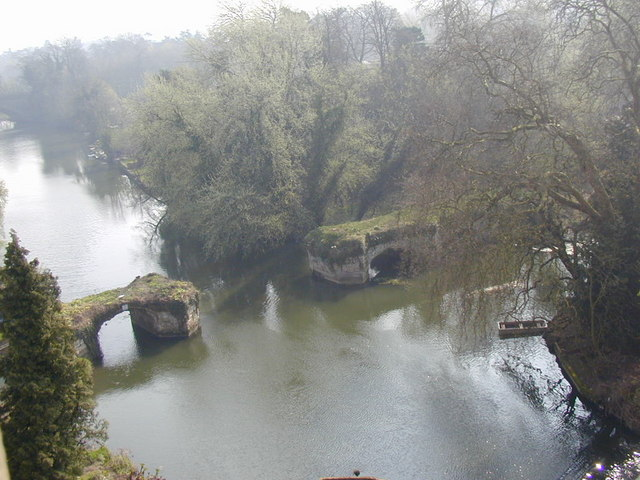
View of the bridge ruins from Warwick Castle

The Old Castle Bridge in Warwick, England is a ruined medieval bridge. The multi-arch stone bridge was built across the River Avon a short distance south-east of the centre of Warwick town and immediately upstream of the Warwick Castle weir.

It is not clear exactly when the bridge was built, but references to it have been found from as early as 1208. By 1373 half the width of the bridge was said to be in ruins, and it was said to have been repaired by charitable means. The guild of Warwick became responsible for its upkeep until 1545. It's likely that the bridge at one time included some form of barrier, to enable it to act as part of the town's defences.

A new bridge was built upstream of the old one in the 18th century and in 1795 the old bridge was largely swept away by flood waters. The ruined remains of the old bridge include three complete arches standing in the middle of the river, and fragments on both banks, which are more extensive on the southern bank where the bridge apparently ended in a causeway. The bridge remains are protected by Historic England as a Grade II* listed structure.

== See also ==
- Castle Bridge - the old bridge's 18th century replacement.
