= William Young (architect) =

Scottish architect (1843–1900)

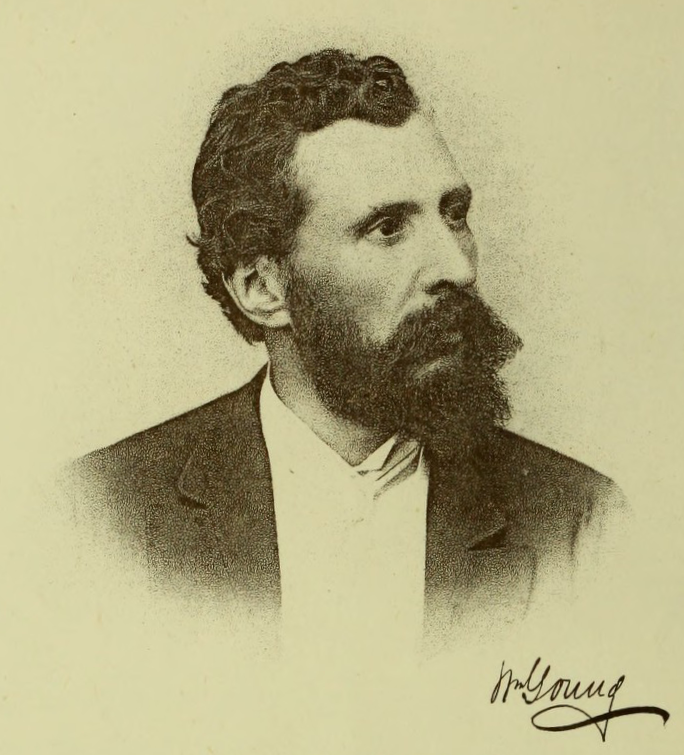
Young, c. 1890

William Young (early 1843 – 1 November 1900) was a Scottish architect, the designer of Glasgow City Chambers.

== Biography ==
=== Early life ===
Young was born in Paisley, Renfrewshire, in early 1843, to James Young, a bootmaker and spirit dealer. He was baptized on 25 March.

=== Career ===
During the late 1850s, he was articled to James Jamieson Lamb of Paisley and moved in 1859 to the Glasgow office of William Nairne Tait. He then spent time in Manchester before moving to London in 1865 as an assistant in the office of Charles Henry Howell, the Surrey county surveyor. This let him study at the South Kensington School in preparation to start his own business in 1869. In 1870, he was commissioned by Francis Charteris, 10th Earl of Wemyss, Lord Elcho, to erect a 50,000 square feet timber marquee at Wimbledon Common for the National Rifle Brigade. This was followed by a commission in 1873 from Lord Elcho's brother-in-law, William Wells, MP, to build him a large Tudor Gothic style country house, Holmewood Hall, near Peterborough.

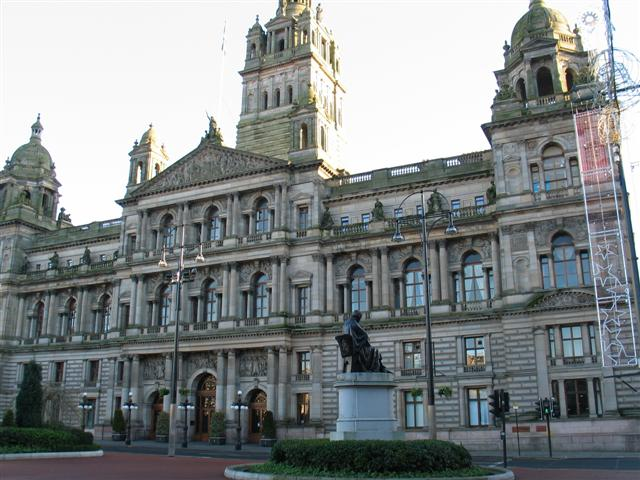
Glasgow City Chambers

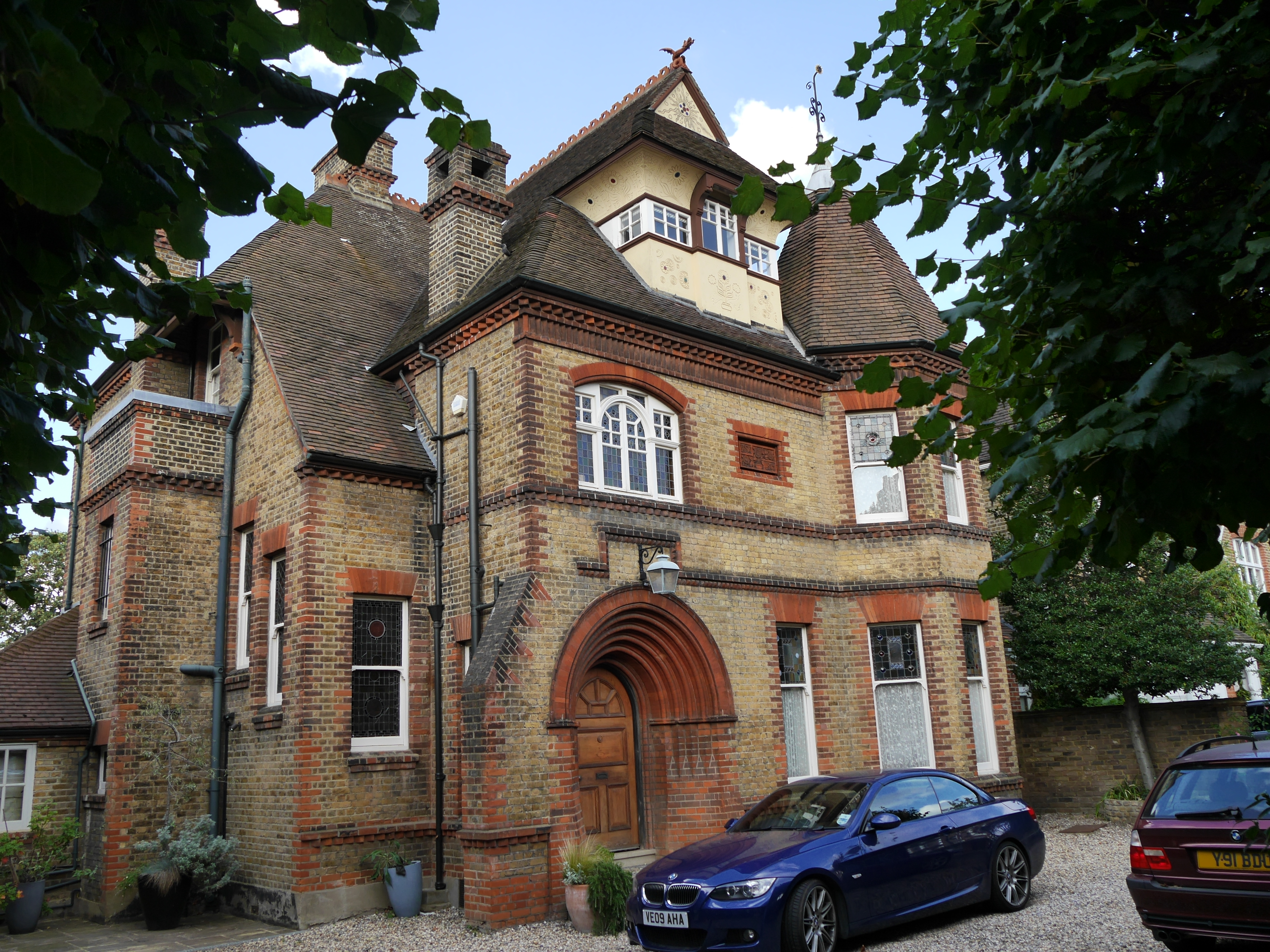
23 Oakhill Road, Putney, London

He set up in premises in the Strand and received a steady stream of commissions, including Haseley Manor, Warwick (1875), Peebles Parish Church (1885-7) and new wings for Gosford House, Lothian (1891). In London, he designed Chelsea House, Cadogan Place (1874) for Earl Cadogan and competed unsuccessfully in the South Kensington Museum Competition of 1891. With the help of Lord Elcho, however, he was given the commission for the new War Office in Whitehall (later completed by his son, Clyde Francis Young). In addition to his design work he wrote a number of publications to advertise his work, such as "Town and Country Mansions and Suburban Houses" in 1873 and "Town and Country Mansions with Notes on the Sanitary and Artistic Construction of Houses" in 1878.

In 1881, he won the competition for Glasgow City Chambers in George Square, Glasgow. This building, built between 1881 and 1890, features the largest set of sculptures in the city, symbolizing aspects of the city's industrial, commercial and cultural achievement.

He was admitted FRIBA in 1891.

=== Death ===
He died on 1 November 1900, at 23 Oakhill Road, his home in Putney, London (which he designed himself in 1879), and was buried at Putney Vale Cemetery. His son Clyde completed his work in progress, including the extensive alterations to Elveden Hall, Suffolk.
