= William Henry Duignan =

- Born: August 16, 1824; Walsall, England
- Died: March 27, 1914 (aged 89); Walsall
- Occupation: Solicitor
- Known for: Antiquarian, writer, local politician

William Henry Duignan (16 August 1824 – 27 March 1914) was a solicitor who lived in and around the town of Walsall for his entire life. He was better known as an antiquarian, writer, historian and local politician and wrote a number of books and pamphlets about local history and especially on the etymology of place naming, many of which are still available today.

== Life ==
Duignan was born of Irish descent in Walsall in 1824; his grandfather, latterly a master at Walsall Grammar School, had emigrated to England from County Longford. He had three children, Florency-Mary, Ernest-Henry, and George-Stubbs, by Mary Minors, of Fisherwick, whom he married in 1850; and a further three children, Bernard, Carl, and Oscar, by Jenny Petersen, of Stockholm, whom he married in 1868. An antiquarian and etymologist, he wrote three histories of place names and a monograph on Rushall Hall, where he had lived for 29 years. He travelled widely around Britain and Ireland, earning the nickname "the man on a tricycle" after his preferred mode of travel. He was often accompanied in his travels by the Staffordshire businessman and writer Willam Henry Robinson.

== Works ==
Duignan's most widely known works are his three etymologies of place names in the West Midlands, Notes on Staffordshire Place Names (1902), Worcestershire Place Names (1905), and Warwickshire Place Names (1912); all are still available in reproduction form today.

== Arms ==
Coat of arms of William Henry Duignan

Notes
Confirmed 6 November 1891 by Sir John Bernard Burke, Ulster King of Arms.
Crest
An owl at gaze Proper.
Escutcheon
Argent on a mount in base Vert an oak tree the stem entwined with two serpents interwoven and erect respecting each other all Proper.
Motto
Historia Magistra Vitae

== Bibliography ==
- Notes on Staffordshire Place Names (1902) ISBN 978-1110699377
- Worcestershire Place Names (1905) ISBN 978-0548228364
- A Forgotten Worcestershire Monastery (1910)
- Warwickshire Place Names (1912) ISBN 978-1152844902
