= Castle Bridge =

Bridge in Warwick, England

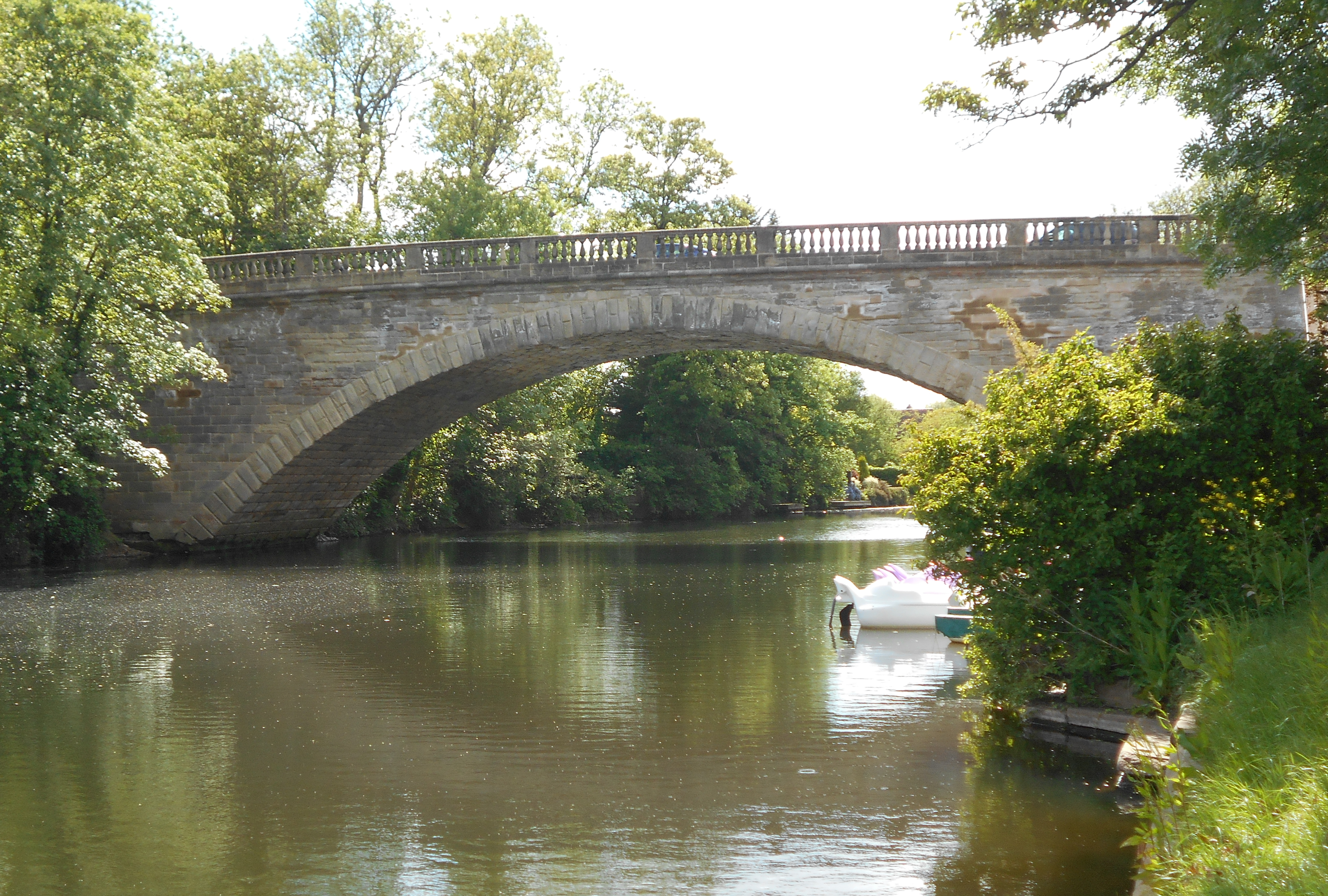
- Interactive map of Castle Bridge
- 52.279629°N 1.579537°W
- Location: Banbury Road, Warwick, Warwickshire, England

Listed Building – Grade II*
- Official name: Castle Bridge
- Designated: 10 January 1953
- Reference no.: 1184083

Scheduled monument
- Official name: Castle Bridge
- Reference no.: 1002987

Castle Bridge is a grade II* listed road bridge in Warwick, Warwickshire, England, which carries the A425 road over the River Avon.

Warwick Bridge Act 1788
- Act of Parliament
- Parliament of Great Britain
- Long title: An Act for enabling the Right Honourable George Earl Brooke and Earl of Warwick, to build a new Bridge over the River Avon, in the Borough of Warwick, and to open proper Roads and Ways thereto.
- Citation: 28 Geo. 3. c. 9
- Territorial extent: Great Britain

Dates
- Royal assent: 20 March 1788
- Commencement: 27 November 1787 (Note: Start of session.)

Status: Current legislation

Text of statute as originally enacted

In 1788, the Earl of Warwick, George Greville had obtained an act of Parliament, the Warwick Bridge Act 1788 (28 Geo. 3. c. 9), to build a new bridge over the Avon. The bridge was built between 1790 and 1793, at a cost of around £3,258, some 400 metres east of Warwick Castle. It consists of a single arch made from sandstone.

It replaced an older medieval bridge further downstream, which became known as Old Castle Bridge and is now a ruin.
