= Beausale =

Hamlet in Warwickshire, England

Coordinates: 52.335°N 1.648°W

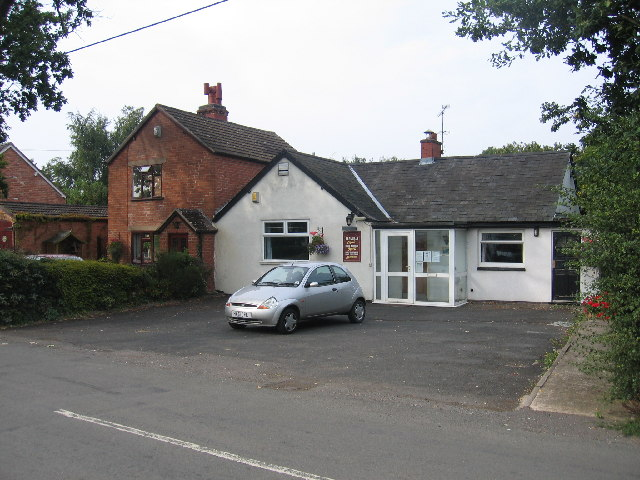
- Beausale Village Club

- Location within Warwickshire
- Population: 202 (2001 census)
- Civil parish: Beausale, Haseley, Honiley and Wroxall
- District: Warwick
- Shire county: Warwickshire
- Region: West Midlands
- Country: England
- Sovereign state: United Kingdom

Beausale is a hamlet and former civil parish, now in the parish of Beausale, Haseley, Honiley and Wroxall, in the Warwick district of Warwickshire, England, north-west of Warwick. According to the 2001 Census it had a population of 202. On 1 April 2007 the parish was abolished to form "Beausale, Haseley, Honiley and Wroxall".
