= Hastings Gilford =

English surgeon and medical writer

- Born: July 2, 1861; Melton Mowbray, Leicestershire, England, UK
- Died: September 6, 1941 (aged 80)
- Other name: John Cope (writing as)
- Occupations: Surgeon, medical writer
- Known for: Hutchinson-Gilford progeria syndrome, alternate cancer treatments
- Scientific career
- Workplaces: Evelina London Children's Hospital

Hastings Gilford (July 2, 1861 – September 6, 1941) F.R.C.S. was an English surgeon, best known for his description of Hutchinson–Gilford progeria syndrome in 1897. Gilford was also an alternative cancer treatment advocate who wrote under the pseudonym John Cope.

== Biography ==
Gilford was born at Melton Mowbray, Leicestershire, England on July 2, 1861. He qualified M.R.C.S. and L.R.C.P. from Guy's Hospital in 1887. He took the F.R.C.S in 1889. He was clinical assistant at Evelina Hospital for Sick Children and surgeon for the Reading Dispensary. During World War I he was surgeon in charge of the Sutherland War Hospital and Hospital for Pensioners. He was elected vice-president of the Reading Pathological Society in 1908 and was a member of the British Medical Association.

== Cancer research ==
Gilford took interest in the aetiology of cancer. He relied on clinical and post-mortem observations in his study of the origin of tumours. Under the pseudonym John Cope, he authored Cancer: Civilization: Degeneration in 1932. Gilford came to the conclusion that cancer is a disease of civilization and rarely found amongst primitive peoples.

Gilford suggested that constipation from faulty foods causes cancer as well as irritants such as dentures, furnace heat, glass eyes, sexual perversion and tobacco. He took issue with milk, puddings and many liquids. He promoted a diet of fruit, meats and nuts. It was negatively reviewed in several medical journals. A review in the American Journal of Cancer concluded "This beautifully printed volume only repeats a lot of long since disproved ideas on the subject of cancer. It is not even accurate enough to place in the hands of the layman, for he will only wander among the quotations, anecdotes, and other ornaments which fill the book and look in vain for anything new about cancer." A positive review appeared in the British Journal of Nursing which described it as well-written treatise on cancer with much valuable material. The book proposed some controversial ideas. Professor and historian Robert N. Proctor has described Gilford as a misogynist.

Gilford's last published book on cancer was The Cancer Problem and its Solution, in 1934. It received a mixed review in the Journal of the American Medical Association which disagreed with the thesis but applauded its interesting philosophical speculation. It was positively reviewed in the British Medical Journal.

Gilford recommended people to exercise and avoid using cars. According to Gilford "the luxurious car brings with it the evils which arise out of inadequate exercise of the muscles... In the end, the man who walks and marries is the gainer. He is healthier and in every way better for the exercise, and both he and his wife are less likely to become cancerous."

== Selected publications ==
- The Disorders of Post-Natal Growth and Development (1911)
- Tumours and Cancers: A Biological Study (1925)
- Cancer: Civilization: Degeneration (1932)
- The Cancer Problem and its Solution (1934)

== See also ==
- J. Ellis Barker
- Ernest H. Tipper
