= Wroxall, Warwickshire =

Village in Warwickshire, England

Coordinates: 52°20′23″N 1°40′17″W

Wroxall
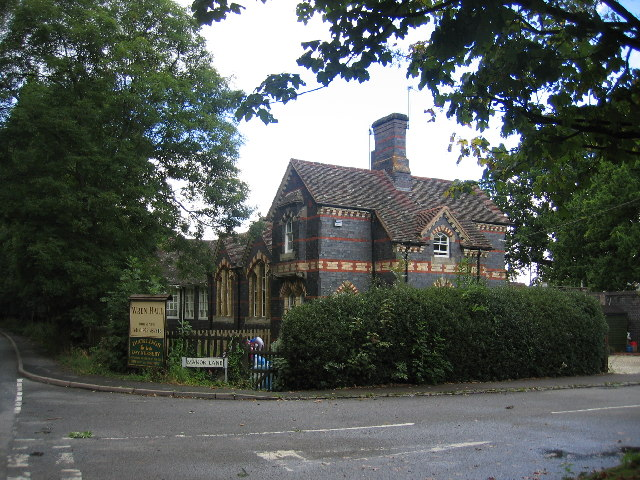
- Wren Hall

- Location within Warwickshire
- Population: 94 (2001 census)
- Civil parish: Beausale, Haseley, Honiley and Wroxall
- District: Warwick
- Shire county: Warwickshire
- Region: West Midlands
- Country: England
- Sovereign state: United Kingdom

Wroxall is a small village and former civil parish, now in the parish of Beausale, Haseley, Honiley and Wroxall, in the Warwick district, in the county of Warwickshire, England. It is 4.0 miles (6.4 km) west of Kenilworth, 5.0 miles (8.0 km) north of Warwick and 7.5 miles (12.1 km) southwest of Coventry on the A4141 road. According to the 2001 census the parish had a population of 94. On 1 April 2007 the parish was abolished to form "Beausale, Haseley, Honiley and Wroxall". It has its own cemetery to the north of the village. By far the most important part of the village is the Wroxall Abbey Estate. Built in 1141 by Sir Hugh de Hatton it was a Benedictine Priory for nearly four hundred years, finally closing in 1536 at the Dissolution of the Monasteries. In 1490, Wroxall was the birthplace of Richard Shakespeare, grandfather of William Shakespeare.

For the next four hundred years it passed through various hands, notable examples being the Burgoyne baronets and Sir Christopher Wren who purchased it as a retreat just three years after completing his work on St. Paul's Cathedral in 1710. It became a girls' school in 1936. The school in turn closed in 1995. In 2001 the current owners, a private investment company, bought the hall. It is now used as a hotel, spa and conference centre. In March 2006, motorsport company Prodrive announced its intent to build a 200-acre (81-hectare) motorsport facility called The Fulcrum. It will be located at the former RAF Honiley airfield which is located between Wroxall and Honiley. In late 2008 however a change in the rules of Formula One motor racing meant the proposal became uncertain. Haseley Manor, which is a Grade II-listed country house is nearby.
