= Ernest H. Tipper =

English physician and medical writer

Ernest Harry Tipper M.R.C.S was an English physician, surgeon and alternative cancer treatment advocate.

== Biography ==
Tipper served for many years in the West African Medical Service. He authored The Cradle of the World and Cancer, in 1927. The book was based on his twenty years of medical practice in Nigeria. He examined only six cases of cancer out of an estimated 300,000 patients. The Nigerian diet was low in meat and high in fibre which is opposite to the European diet. Tipper came to the conclusion that constipation and excessive meat-eating were the causes of cancer.

According to Tipper the Béné tribe, who live in the Niger Delta amongst whom he practised for twenty years, are almost free from cancer and live on a semi-vegetarian diet. They live on beans, fruits, seeds, monkey nuts, yams, maize, cayenne peppers, palm oil and occasionally palm wine. Tipper reported that they use 4 oz. of red palm oil daily. They eat eggs and fish, the occasional chicken but rarely any red meat. The drinking of milk is repulsive to the natives. Tipper reported that the men can carry a load of 50 lb on their heads 25 miles a day in tropical heat and their bones and teeth are remarkable. Tipper recommended his readers to abandon meat-eating and dairy, limit flour intake from bread or pastry and substitute butter with palm butter. Tipper's ideas did not receive much notice in medical literature and his book remains obscure. There was a positive review in the British Medical Journal.

Tipper's research is quoted by Sir William Arbuthnot Lane in his book The Prevention of the Diseases Peculiar to Civilization, in 1929.

== Selected publications ==
- The Cradle of the World and Cancer: A Disease of Civilisation (1927)

== See also ==
- J. Ellis Barker
- Hastings Gilford
