= Haseley Manor, Warwickshire =

Manor house in Haseley, Warwickshire, England

Haseley Manor
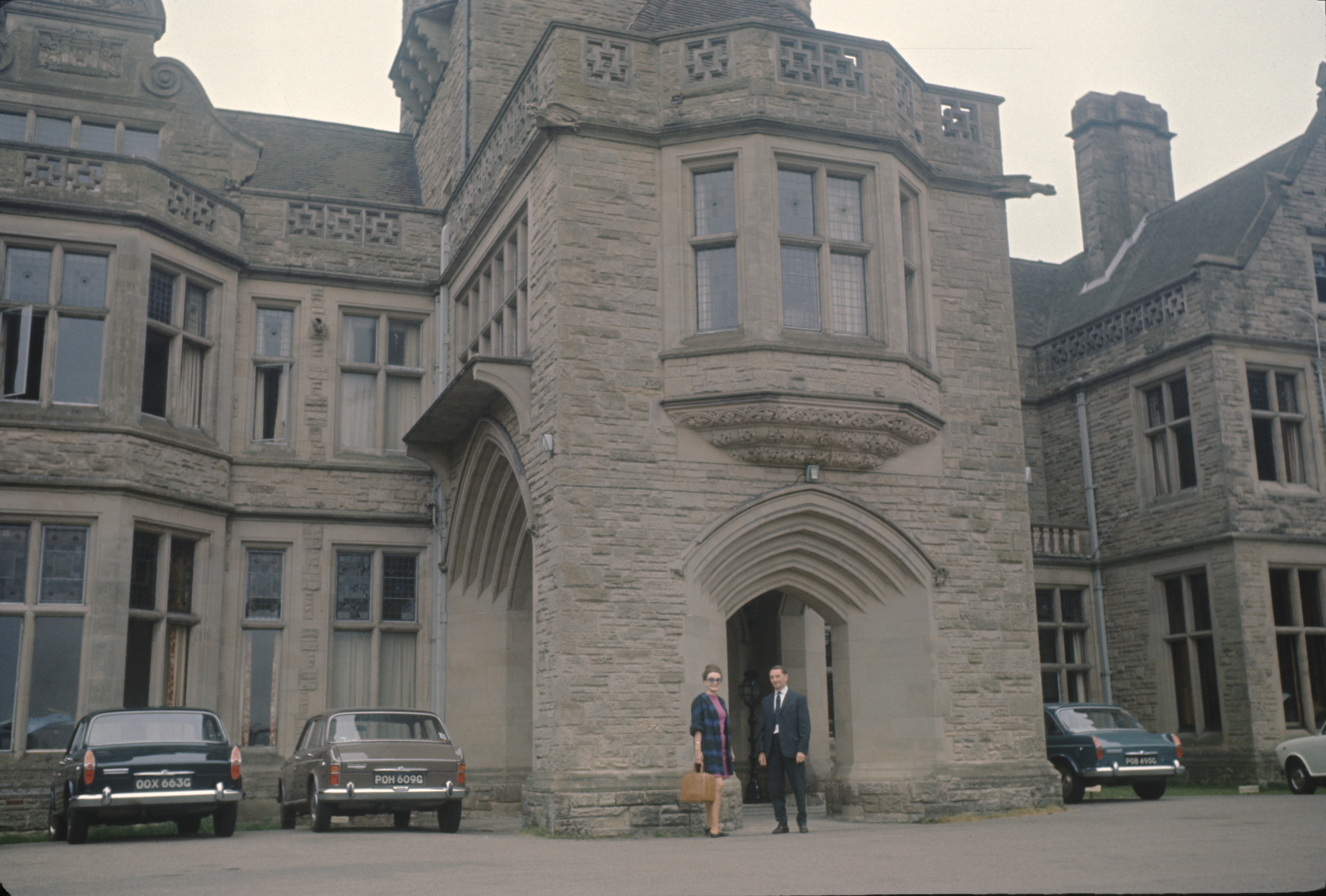
- Haseley Manor in the 1970s
- Interactive map of the Haseley Manor area

General information
- Location: Haseley, Warwickshire, England
- Construction started: 1875
- Completed: 1878

Design and construction
- Architect: William Young

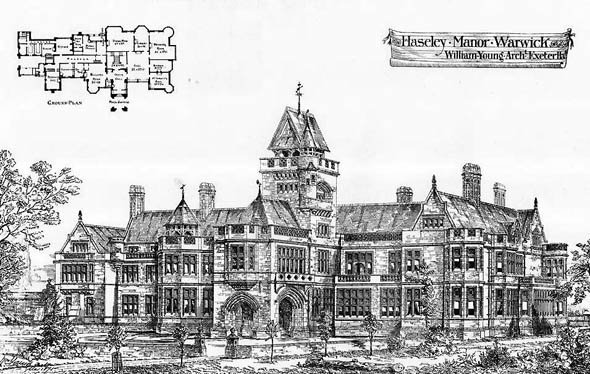
Perspective view and ground plan, published in The Building News, 16 July 1875

Haseley Manor is a Grade II-listed English country house in Haseley, Warwickshire, England.

== Architecture ==
The house was built from 1875 to 1878, to designs by the architect William Young, for Alfred Hewlett, a coal merchant from Lancashire. It has walls of rock-faced stone and plain tile roofs, and is in the Gothic and Elizabethan styles, including a Gothic turret. It has been Grade II listed since January 1987, giving it legal protection from unauthorised alterations or demolition.

== Uses ==
In 1930, the house was acquired by the Birmingham Society for the Care of Invalid Children, and put to use as a convalescent home and hospital school for girls. It was then purchased by Birmingham Education Authority and, from 1941, became Haseley Hall Residential Open-Air School For Boys, and was used as a children's home and orphanage.

At some subsequent point it was owned by W & T Avery. By the mid-1960s, it was being used as staff college by the British Motor Corporation, and its nationalised successor, British Leyland. It was next used as a business and conference centre.

It was acquired subsequently by Spitfire Bespoke Homes who subdivided and converted it into a number of private residences, completed circa 2018, including thirteen one, two and three-bedroom apartments. An additional nine residences, including three garden villas and five terraced houses, were created in its grounds. The project architect was Mike Lapworth.
