= The Mill Garden =

Coordinates: 52.2795°N 1.5836°W

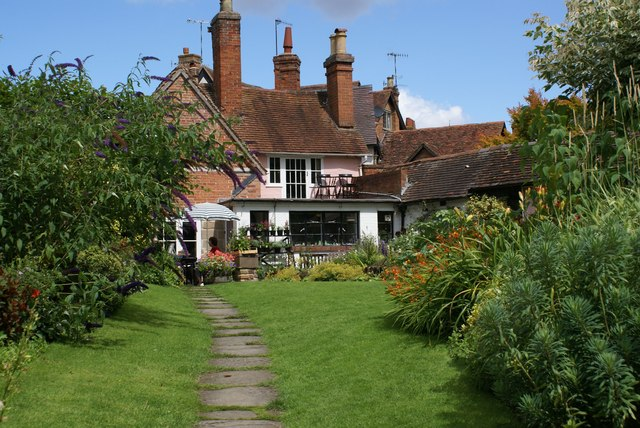
Pathway through The Mill Garden

The Mill Garden is a private garden adjacent to Warwick Castle measuring half an acre open to the public and situated on the bank of the River Avon in Warwick, Warwickshire, England. It is owned by Julia Measures, whose family has owned the gardens since 1938 and whose father Arthur worked on it for 60 years. Its informal planting to highlight views of the river (and of Warwick Castle in whose shadow it stands) has made this garden well known among some garden enthusiasts. Old Castle Bridge, the remains of which are visible from the garden, once carried most of the traffic to Warwick over the River Avon but the bridge now lies in ruins. When the castle was being constructed the garden was often used as a stonemasons yard. Swans sometimes nest near the garden.

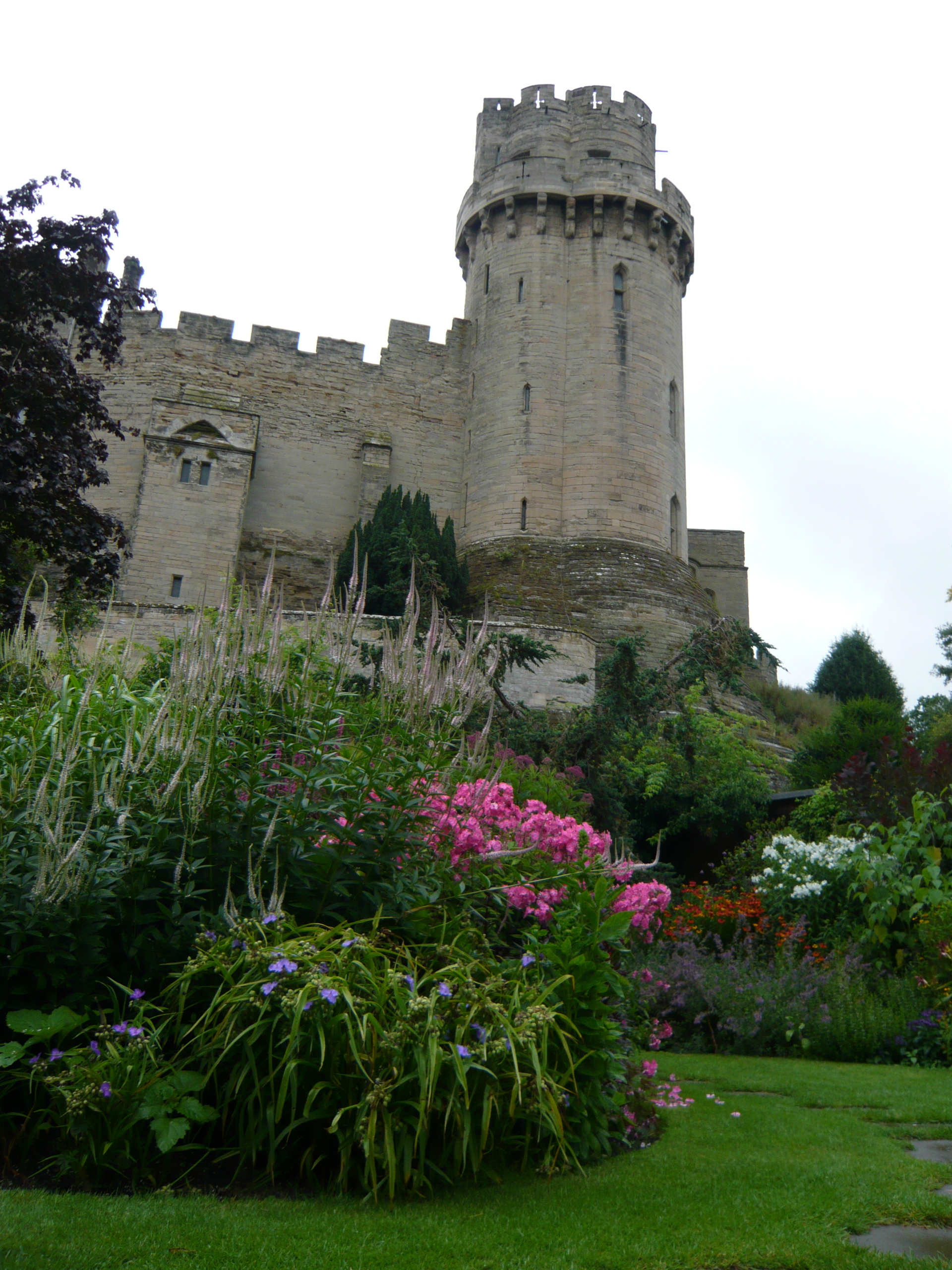
A view of Warwick Castle from The Mill Garden

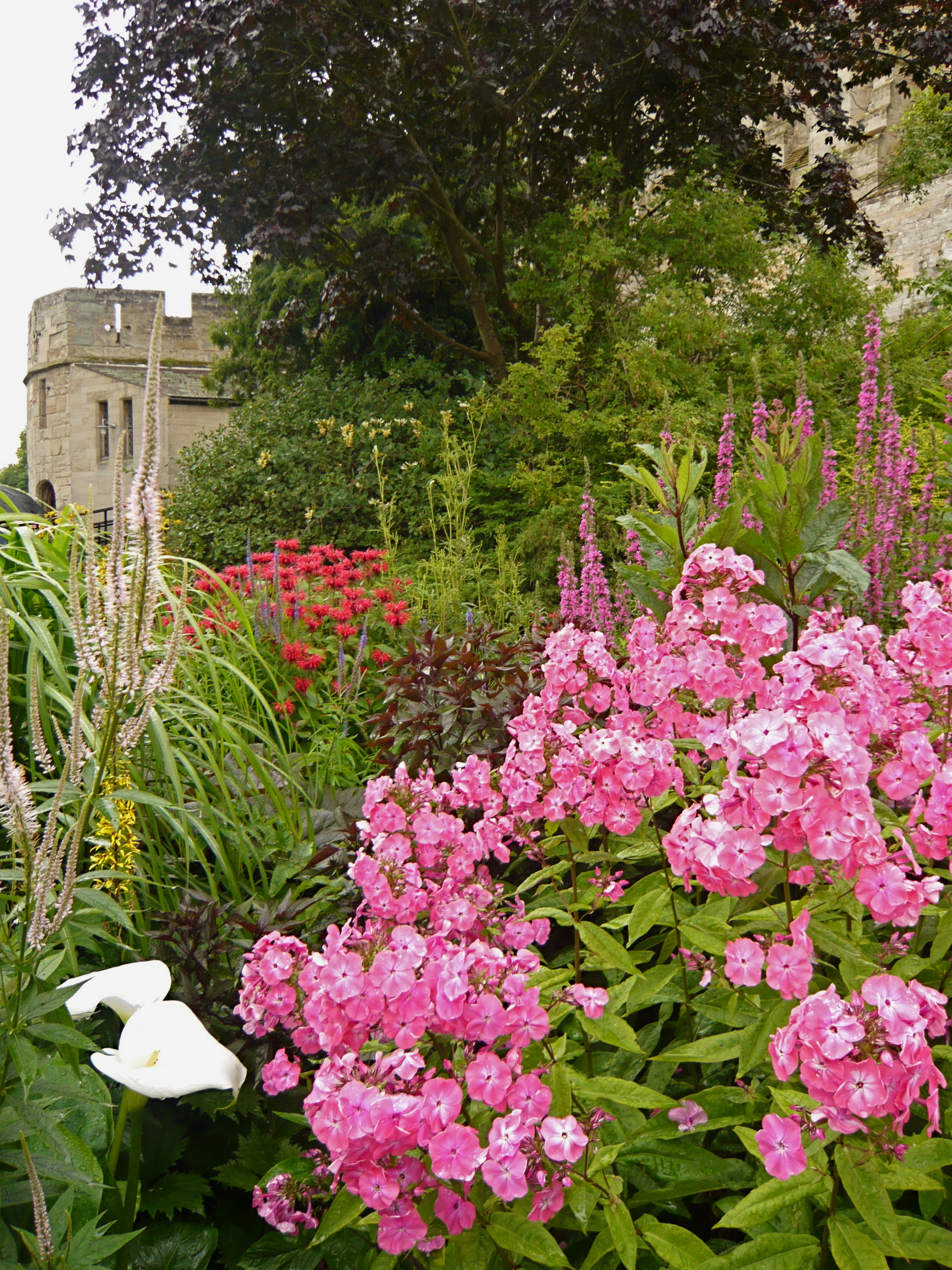
Flowering plants in The Mill Garden

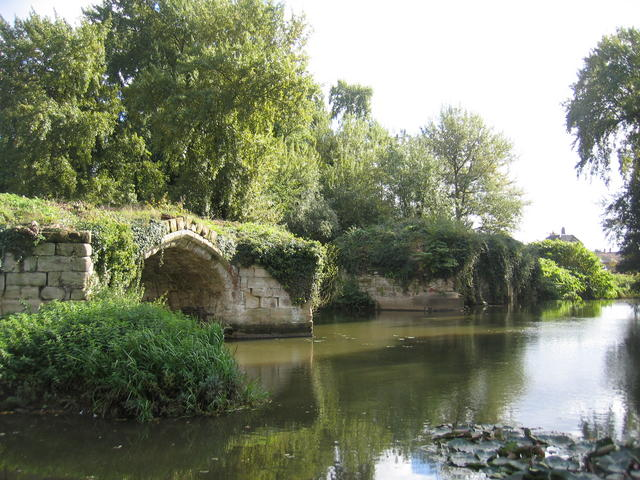
View from The Mill Garden of the remains of Warwick's medieval bridge
