= Warwick Castle =

Medieval castle in Warwickshire, England

- Warwick, Warwickshire, England
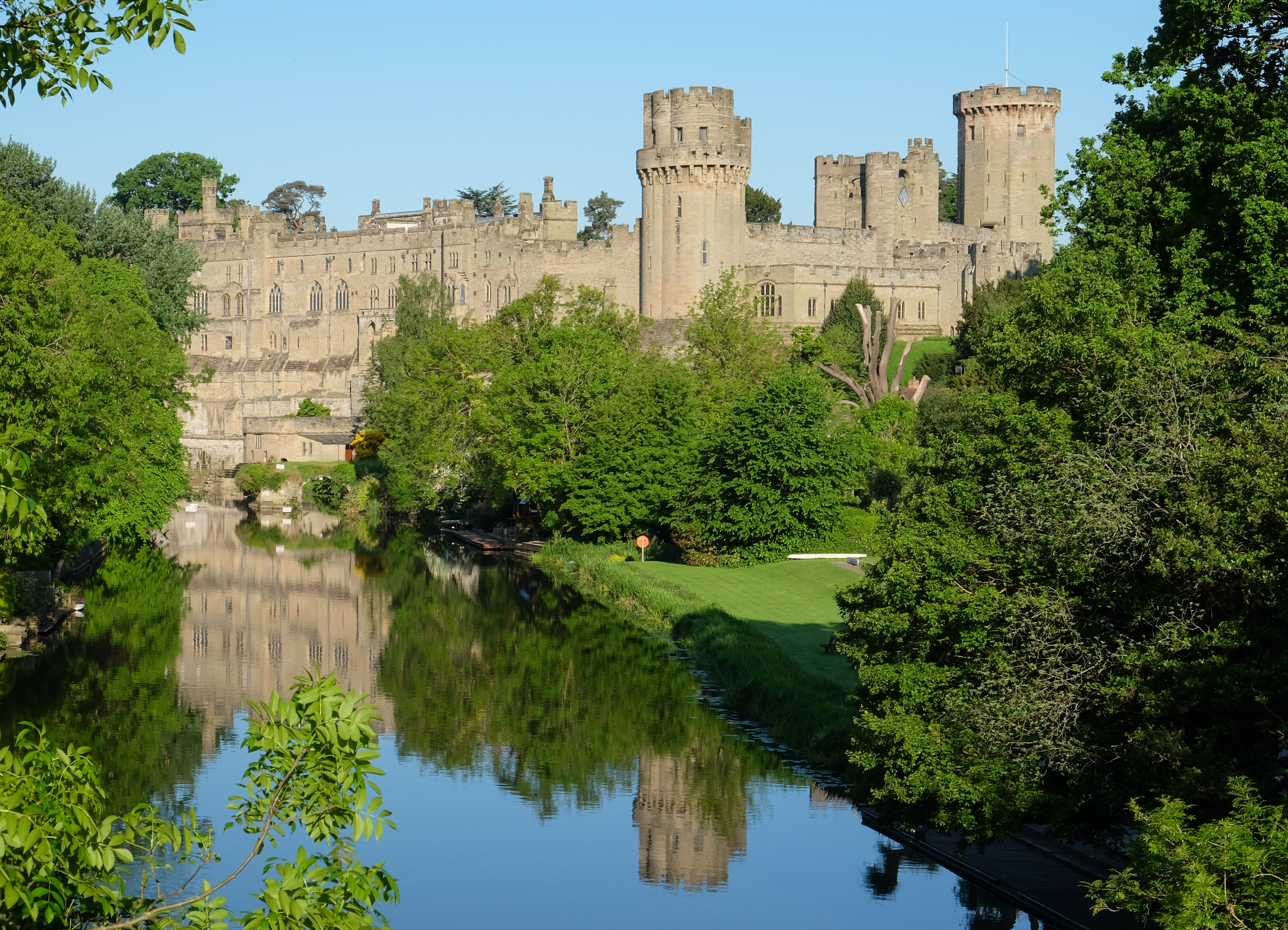
- Warwick Castle and the River Avon

Site information
- Owner: LondonMetric Property
- Operator: Merlin Entertainments
- Open to the public: 1978
- Website: warwick-castle.com

Location
- Coordinates: 52°16′46″N 01°35′05″W

Site history
- Built: 1068
- Materials: Stone

Listed Building – Grade I
- Official name: Warwick Castle
- Designated: 10 January 1953
- Reference no.: 1140311

Scheduled monument
- Official name: Warwick Castle (uninhabited parts)
- Reference no.: 1005757

Listed Building – Grade II*
- Official name: Stables Warwick Castle
- Designated: 10 January 1953
- Reference no.: 1035508

Listed Building – Grade II*
- Official name: Conservatory
- Designated: 19 March 1973
- Reference no.: 1184061

National Register of Historic Parks and Gardens
- Official name: Warwick Castle
- Type: Grade I
- Designated: 1 February 1986
- Reference no.: 1000386

Warwick Castle is a medieval castle developed from a wooden fort originally built by William the Conqueror during 1068. The original wooden motte-and-bailey castle overlooking the River Avon was rebuilt in stone during the 12th century. During the Hundred Years War, the facade opposite the town was refortified, resulting in one of the most recognisable examples of 14th-century military architecture. It was used as a stronghold until the early 17th century, when it was granted to Sir Fulke Greville by James I in 1604. Greville converted it to a country house, and it was owned by the Greville family (who became Earls of Warwick in 1759) until 1978, when it was bought by the Tussauds Group.

In 2007, the Tussauds Group was purchased by the Blackstone Group, which merged it with Merlin Entertainments. Warwick Castle was then sold to Nick Leslau's investment firm, Prestbury Group, under a sale and leaseback agreement. Merlin continues to operate the site under a renewable 35-year lease.

== Location ==
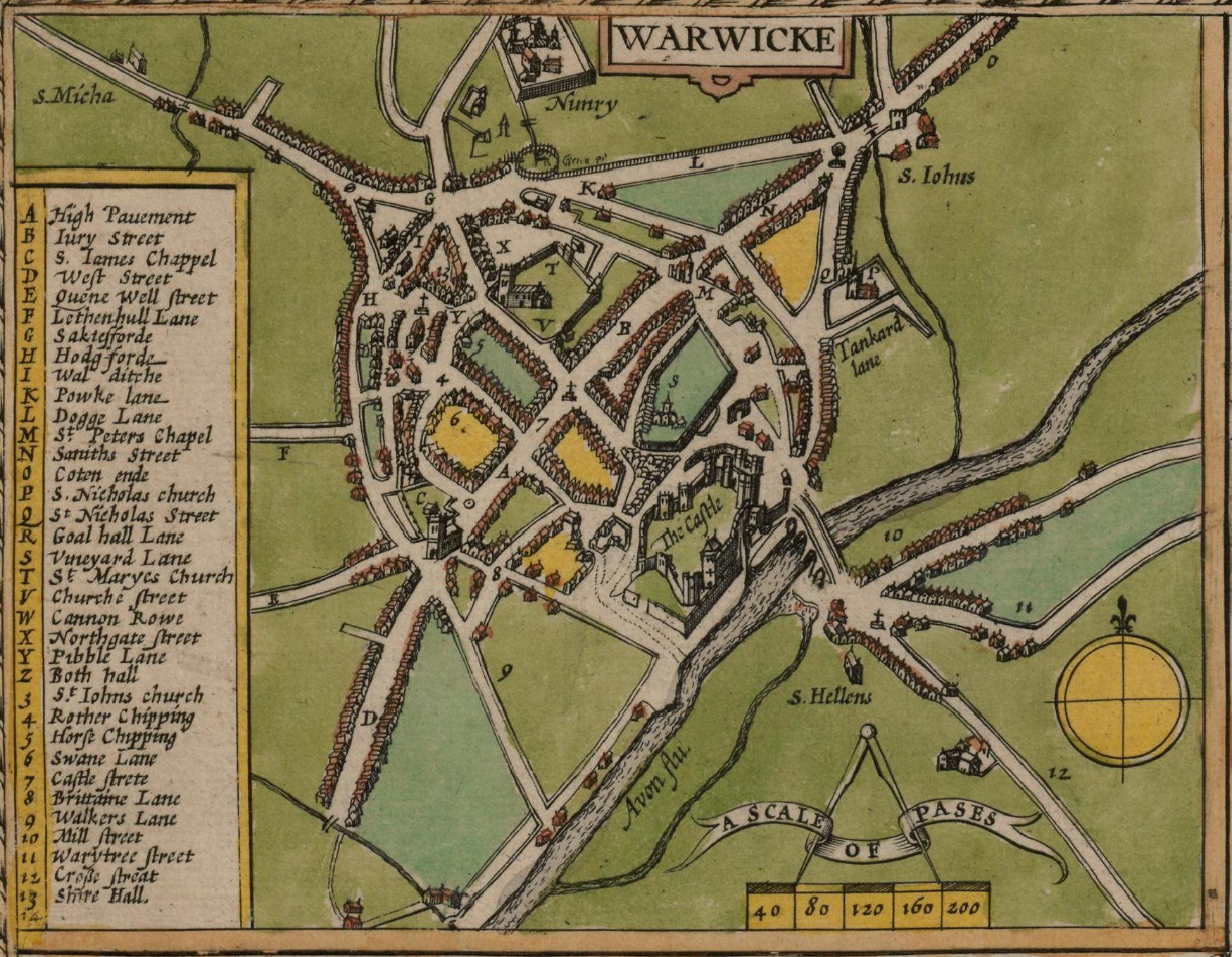
A map published around 1610 by John Speed showing Warwick; the castle is in the south of the town, next to the River Avon.

Warwick Castle is situated in the town of Warwick, on a sandstone bluff at a bend of the River Avon. The river, which runs below the castle on the east side, has eroded the rock the castle stands on, forming a cliff. The river and cliff form natural defences.

When construction began in 1068, four houses belonging to the Abbot of Coventry were demolished to provide space. The castle's position made it strategically important in safeguarding the Midlands against rebellion.

During the 12th century, King Henry I was suspicious of Roger de Beaumont, 2nd Earl of Warwick. To counter the earl's influence, Henry bestowed Geoffrey de Clinton with a position of power rivalling that of the earl.

The lands he was given included Kenilworth – a castle of comparable size, cost, and importance, founded by Clinton – which is about 8 kilometres (5 mi) to the north.

Warwick Castle is about 1.6 kilometres (1 mi) from Warwick railway station and less than 3.2 kilometres (2.0 mi) from junction 15 of the M40 motorway; it is also relatively close to Birmingham Airport.

== History ==
=== Antecedent ===
An Anglo-Saxon burh was established on the site in 914; with fortifications instigated by Æthelflæd, daughter of Alfred the Great. The burh she established was one of ten which defended Mercia against the invading Danes. Its position allowed it to dominate the Fosse Way, as well as the river valley and the crossing over the River Avon. Though the motte to the south-west of the present castle is now called "Ethelfleda's Mound" ('Ethelfleda' being an alternative form of Æthelflæd), it is in fact part of the later Norman fortifications, and not of Anglo-Saxon origin.

It was also at this time, that what is now Warwick School was founded in the castle - making it arguably the oldest boys' school in the country. It still resides just over the River Avon, visible from all of the castle's towers.

=== Middle Ages ===
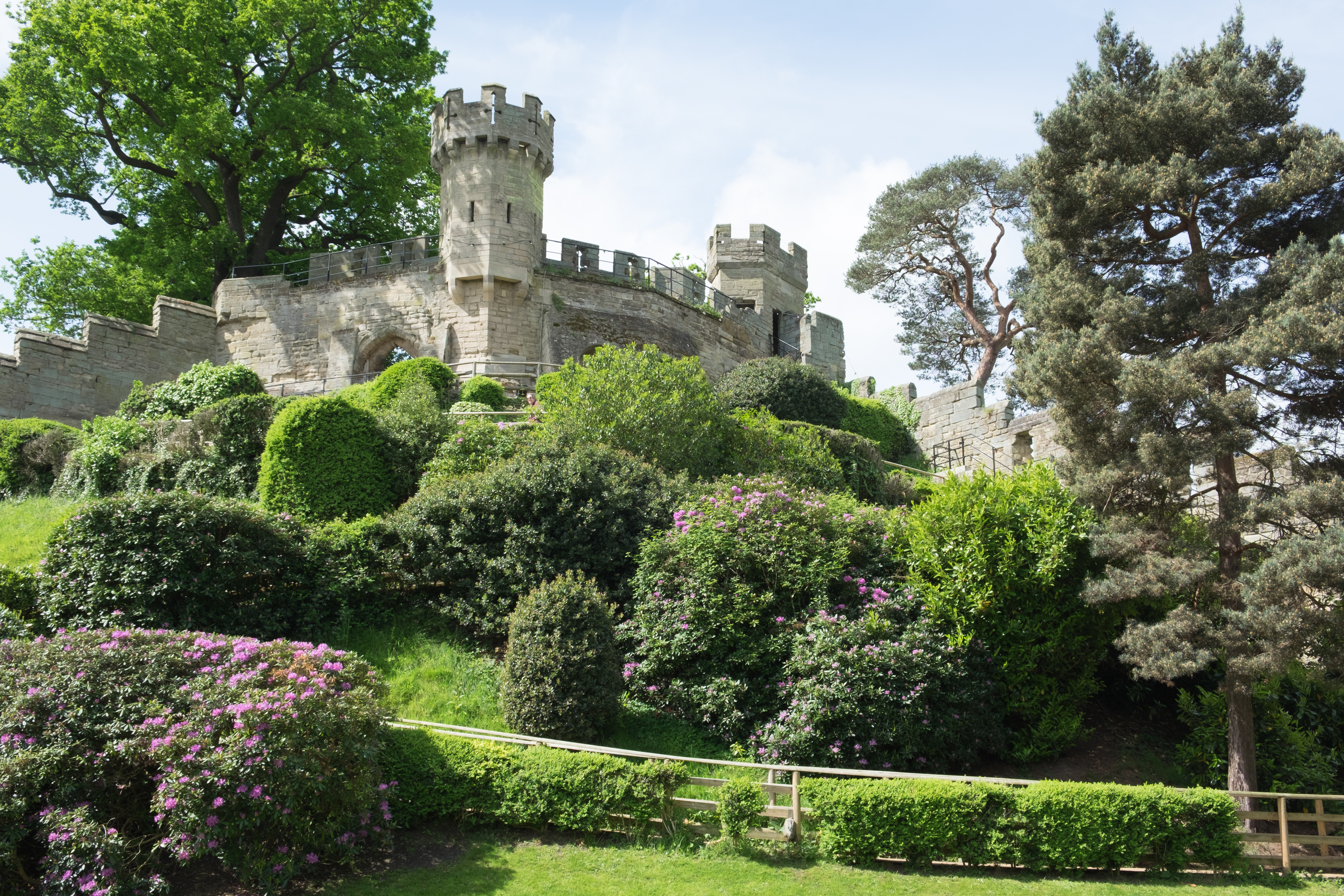
The motte of the Norman motte-and-bailey castle is called Ethelfleda's Mound

After the Norman conquest of England, William the Conqueror established a motte-and-bailey castle at Warwick in 1068 to maintain control of the Midlands as he advanced northwards. Building a castle in a pre-existing settlement could require demolishing properties on the intended site. In the case of Warwick, the least recorded of the 11 urban castles in the 1086 survey, four houses were torn down to make way for the castle. A motte-and-bailey castle consists of a mound – on which usually stands a keep or tower – and a bailey, which is an enclosed courtyard. William II appointed Henry de Beaumont, the son of a powerful Norman family, as constable of the castle. In 1088, Henry de Beaumont was made the first Earl of Warwick. He founded the Church of All Saints within the castle walls by 1119; the Bishop of Worcester, believing that a castle was an inappropriate location for a church, removed it in 1127–28.

In 1153, Gundreda de Warenne was tricked into believing that her husband, Roger de Beaumont, 2nd Earl of Warwick, was dead; she then surrendered control of the castle to the invading army of Henry of Anjou, later King Henry II of England. According to the Gesta Regis Stephani, a 12th-century historical text, Roger de Beaumont died upon hearing the news that his wife had handed over the castle. King Henry II later returned the castle to the Earls of Warwick, as they had been supporters of his mother, Empress Matilda, in The Anarchy of 1135–1154.

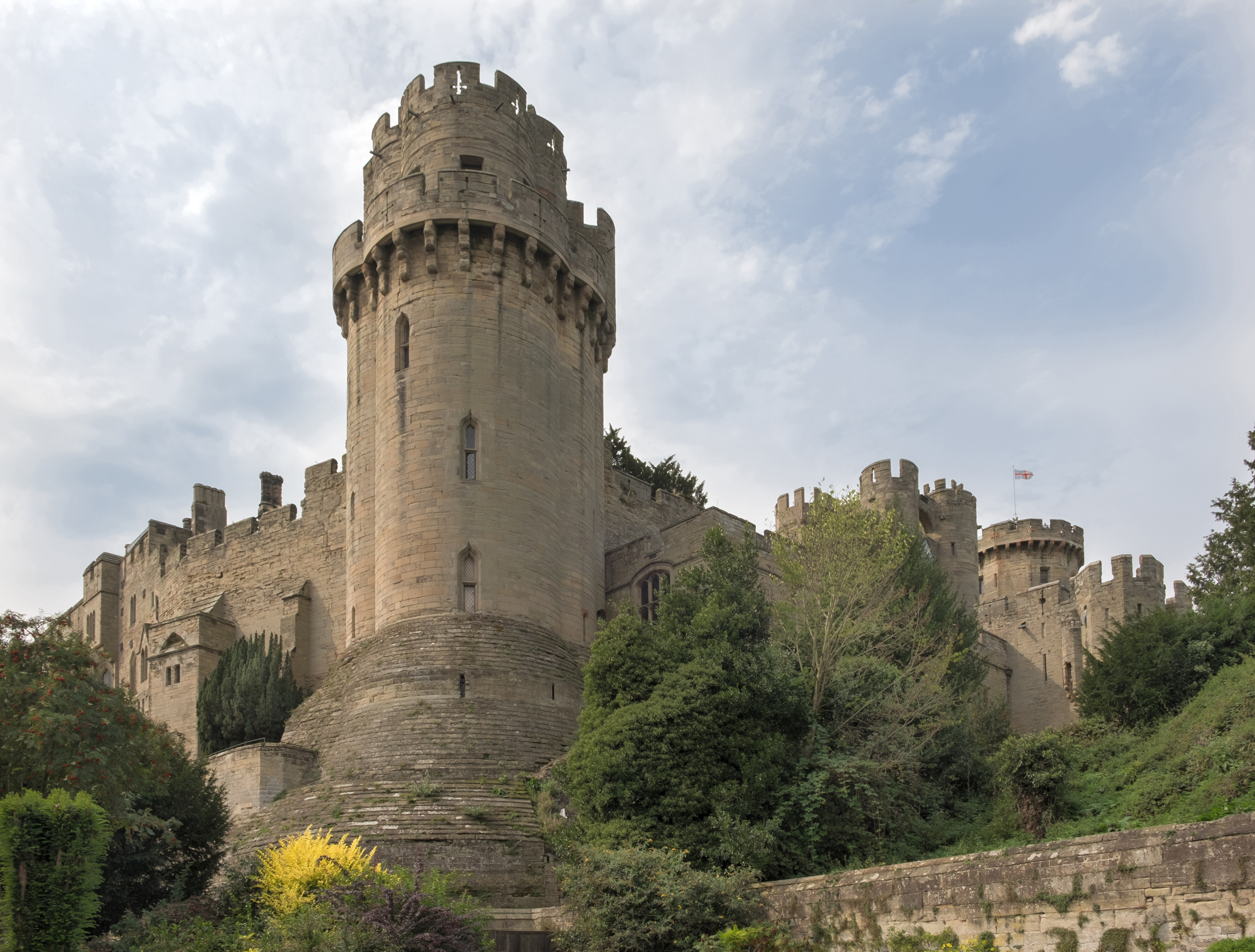
Caesar's Tower was built between 1330 and 1360

During the reign of King Henry II (1154–89), the motte-and-bailey was replaced with a stone keep castle. This new phase took the form of a shell keep with all the buildings constructed against the curtain wall. During the Barons' Rebellion of 1173–74, the Earl of Warwick remained loyal to King Henry II, and the castle was used to store provisions. The castle and the lands associated with the earldom passed down to the Beaumont family until 1242. When Thomas de Beaumont, 6th Earl of Warwick, died, the castle and lands passed to his sister, Margaret de Beaumont, 7th Countess of Warwick in her own right. Her first husband, John Marshal, died soon after, and while she looked for a suitable husband, the castle was in the ownership of King Henry III of England. When she married John du Plessis in December 1242, the castle was returned to her. During the Second Barons' War of 1264–67, William Maudit, 8th Earl of Warwick, was a supporter of King Henry III. The castle was taken in a surprise attack by the forces of Simon de Montfort, 6th Earl of Leicester, from Kenilworth Castle in 1264. According to 15th-century chronicler John Rous, the walls along the northeastern side of Warwick Castle were slighted, so "that it should be no strength to the king". Maudit and his countess were taken to Kenilworth Castle and were held there until a ransom was paid. After the death of William Maudit in 1267, the title and castle passed to his nephew, William de Beauchamp, 9th Earl of Warwick. Following William's death, Warwick Castle passed through seven generations of the Beauchamp family, who, over the next 180 years, were responsible for most of the additions made to the castle. In 1312, Piers Gaveston, 1st Earl of Cornwall, was captured by Guy de Beauchamp, 10th Earl of Warwick, and imprisoned in Warwick Castle, until his execution on 19 June 1312. A group of magnates led by the Earl of Warwick and Thomas, 2nd Earl of Lancaster, accused Gaveston of stealing the royal treasure.

Under Thomas de Beauchamp, 11th Earl, the castle defences were significantly enhanced in 1330–60 on the north eastern side by the addition of a gatehouse, a barbican (a form of fortified gateway), and a tower on either side of the reconstructed wall, named Caesar's Tower and Guy's Tower. The Watergate Tower also dates from this period.

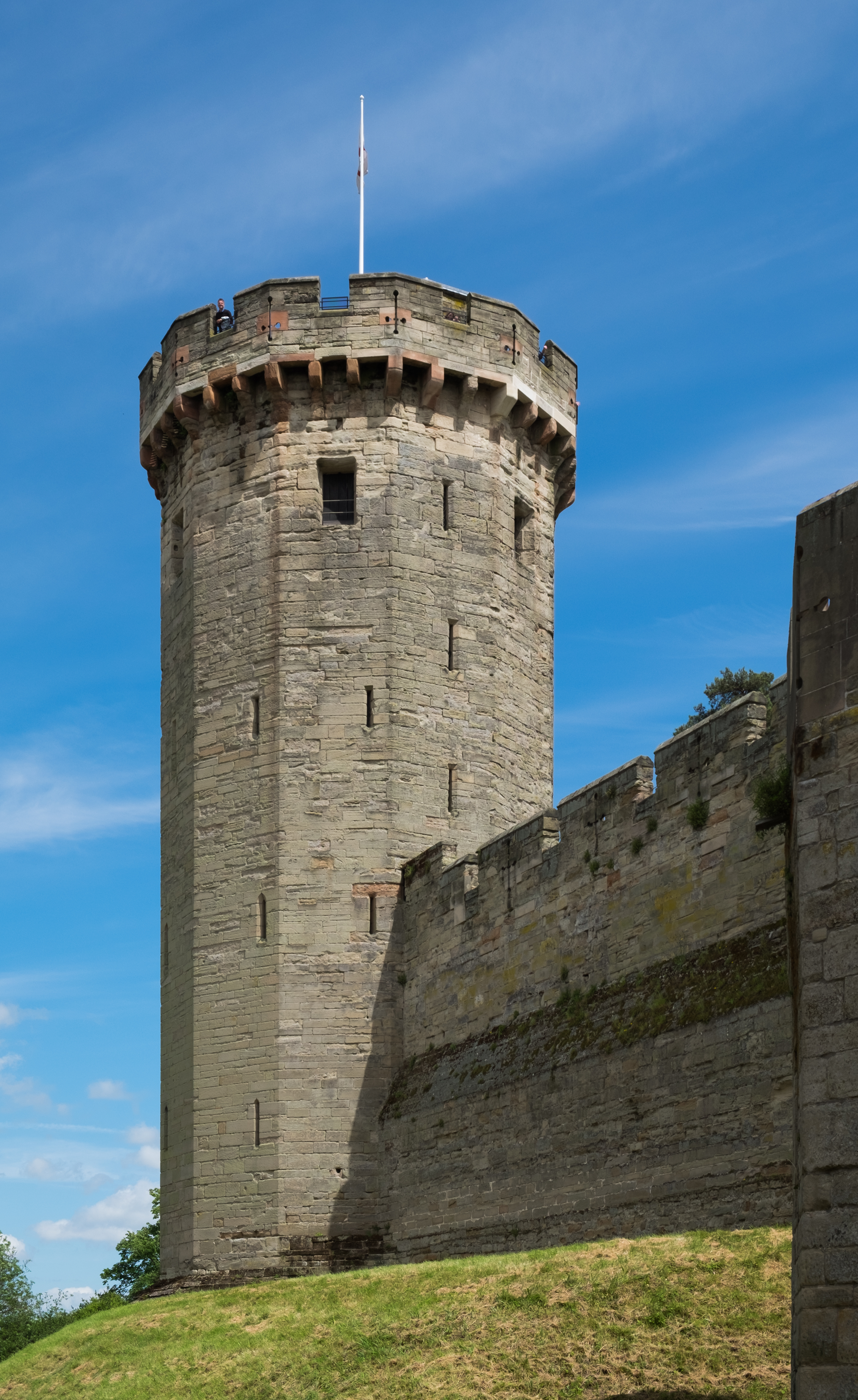
Guy's Tower, constructed 1330–1360, photographed in 2017

Caesar's and Guy's Towers are residential and may have been inspired by French models (for example Bricquebec). Both towers are machicolated and Caesar's Tower features a unique double parapet. The two towers are also vaulted in stone on every storey. Caesar's Tower contained a grim basement dungeon; according to local legend dating back to at least 1644 it is also known as Poitiers Tower, either because prisoners from the Battle of Poitiers in 1356 may have been imprisoned there, or because the ransoms raised from the battle helped to pay for its construction. The gatehouse features murder holes, two drawbridges, a gate, and portcullises – gates made from wood or metal. The towers of the gatehouse were machicolated.

The facade overlooking the river was designed as a symbol of the power and wealth of the Beauchamp earls and would have been "of minimal defensive value"; this followed a trend of 14th-century castles being more statements of power than designed exclusively for military use.

=== 15th and 16th centuries ===
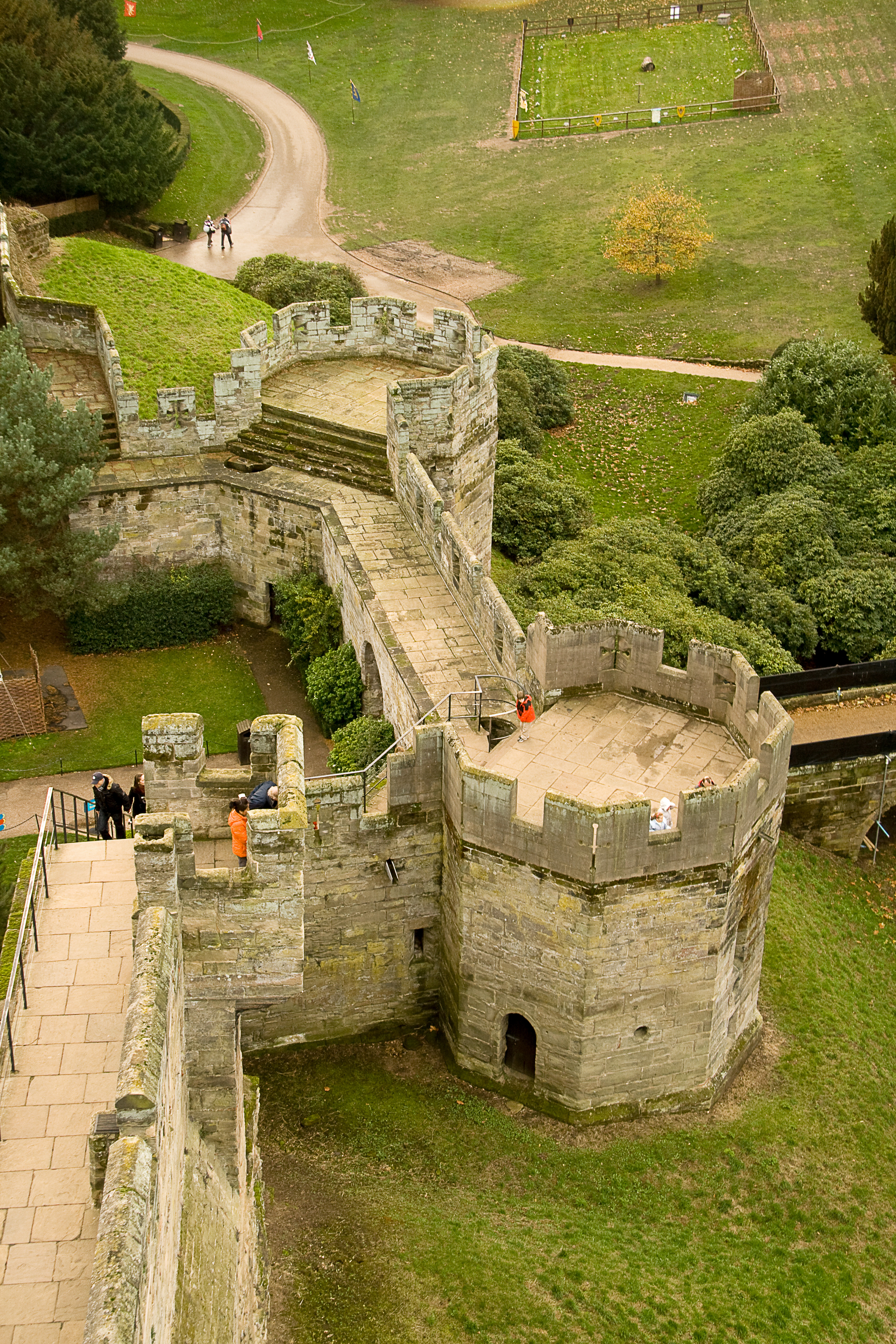
The Bear and Clarence Towers which were built by King Richard III in the 1480s

The line of the Beauchamp Earls ended in 1449 when Anne de Beauchamp, 15th Countess of Warwick, died. Richard Neville, the Kingmaker, became the next Earl of Warwick through his wife's inheritance of the title. During the summer of 1469, Neville rebelled against King Edward IV of England and imprisoned him in Warwick Castle. Neville attempted to rule in the King's name; however, constant protests by the King's supporters forced the Earl to release the King. Neville was subsequently killed in the Battle of Barnet, fighting against the King in 1471 during the Wars of the Roses.

Warwick Castle then passed from Neville to his son-in-law, George Plantagenet, 1st Duke of Clarence (brother of King Edward IV). George Plantagenet was executed in 1478, and his lands passed onto his son, Edward Plantagenet, 17th Earl of Warwick; however, Edward Plantagenet was only two when his father died, so his lands were taken in the custody of The Crown. He was placed under attainder, and so could not inherit the throne, by King Henry VII of England, being held by the King for fourteen years in the Tower of London until he was executed for high treason in 1499, supposedly for conspiring to escape with the 'pretender' Perkin Warbeck. Edward was the last Earl of Warwick of the title's first creation.

In the early 1480s, King Richard III of England (the other son-in-law of Neville) instigated the construction of two gun towers, Bear and Clarence Towers, which were left unfinished on his death in 1485; with their own well and ovens, the towers were an independent stronghold from the rest of the castle, possibly in case of mutiny by the garrison. With the advent of gunpowder, the position of Keeper of the Artillery was created in 1486.

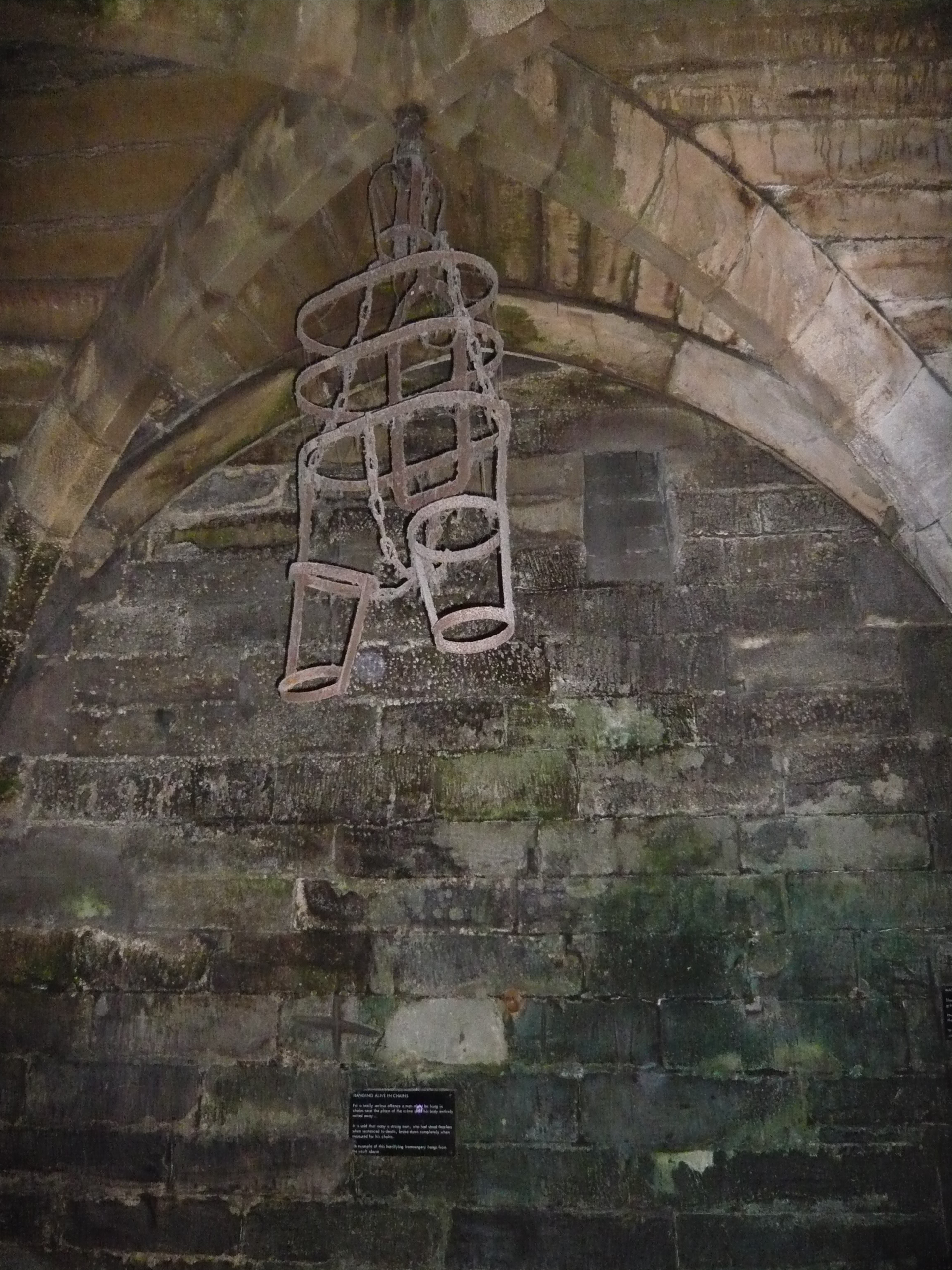
A gibbet, previously on display in the dungeon in the basement of Caesar's Tower

When antiquary John Leland visited the castle some time between 1535 and 1543, he noted that:

... the dungeon now in ruin standeth in the west-north-west part of the castle. There is also a tower west-north-west, and through it a postern-gate of iron. All the principal lodgings of the castle with the hall and chapel lie on the south side of the castle, and here the king doth much cost in making foundations in the rocks to sustain that side of the castle, for great pieces fell out of the rocks that sustain it.

While in the care of The Crown, Warwick Castle underwent repairs and renovations using about 500 loads of stone. The castle, as well as lands associated with the earldom, was in Crown care from 1478 until 1547, when they were granted to John Dudley with the second creation of the title the Earl of Warwick.

When making his appeal for ownership of the castle Dudley said of the castle's condition: "... the castle of its self is not able to lodge a good baron with his train, for all the one side of the said castle with also the dungeon tower is clearly ruinated and down to the ground".

Warwick Castle had fallen into decay due to its age and neglect, and despite his remarks Dudley did not initiate any repairs to the castle. Queen Elizabeth I visited the castle in 1566 during a tour of the country, and again in 1572 for four nights. A timber building was erected in the castle for her to stay in, and Ambrose Dudley, 3rd Earl of Warwick, left the castle to the Queen during her visits.

When Ambrose Dudley died in 1590 the title of Earl of Warwick became extinct for the second time. A survey from 1590 recorded that the castle was still in a state of disrepair, noting that lead had been stolen from the roofs of some of the castle's buildings, including the chapel.

=== 17th-century country house ===
In October 1601 Sir Fulke Greville wrote that "the little stone building there was, mightily in decay, the timber lodgings built thirty years ago for herself (Elizabeth I) all ruinous; ... so as in very short time there will be nothing left but a name of Warwick".

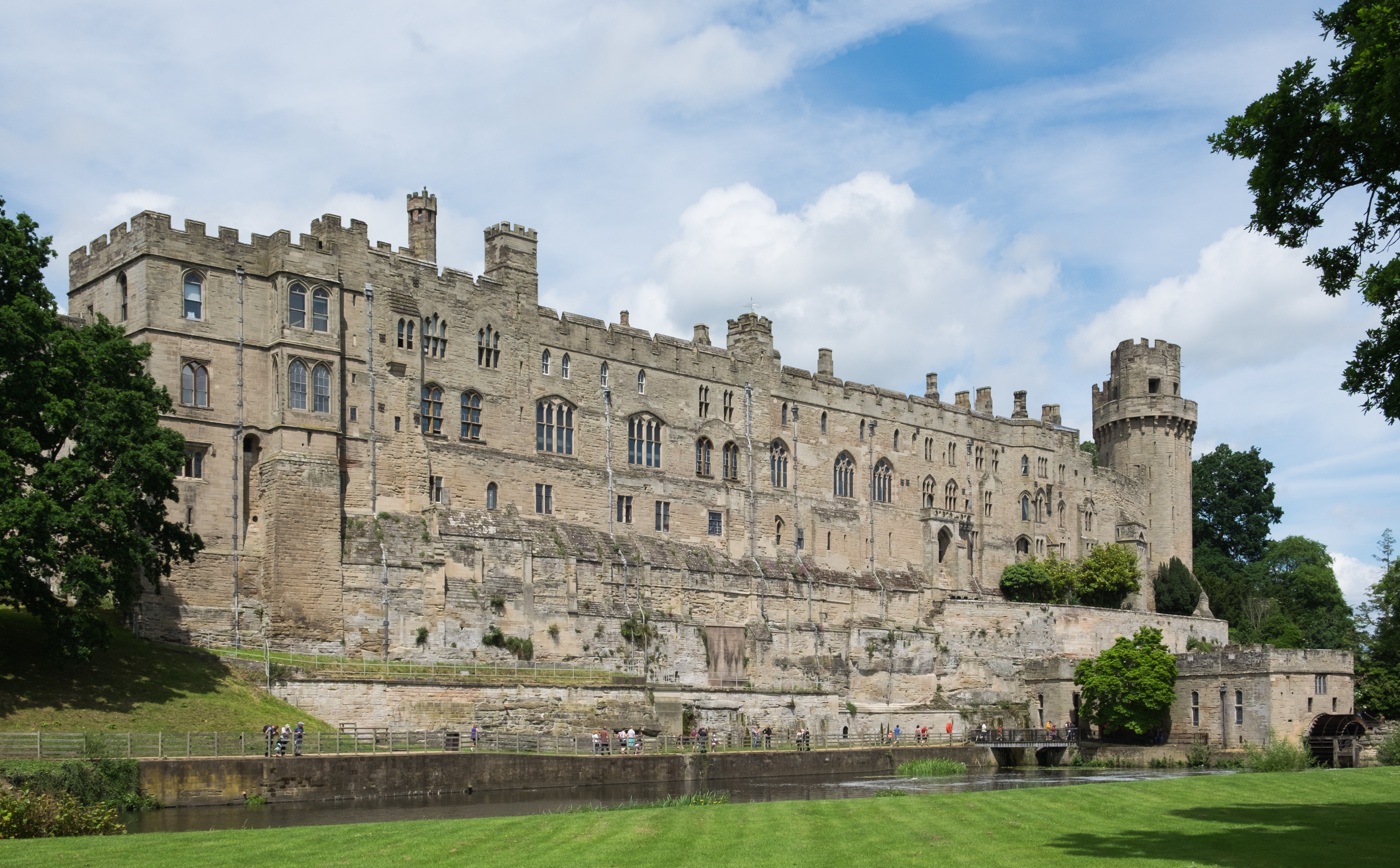
The castle's south facade as seen across the River Avon

Greville was granted the ruinous Warwick Castle by King James I in 1604 and it was converted to a country house. The conversion of the castle coincided with a period of decline in the use of castles during the 15th and 16th centuries; many were either being abandoned or converted into comfortable residences for the gentry. In the early 17th century, Robert Smythson was commissioned to draw a plan of the castle before any changes were made. Whilst the castle was undergoing repairs, it was peripherally involved in the Gunpowder Plot of 1605. The conspirators involved awaited news of their plot in Dunchurch in Warwickshire. When they discovered the plot had failed they stole cavalry horses from the stables at Warwick Castle to help in their escape.

When the title of Earl of Warwick was created for the third time in 1618, the Greville family were still in possession of Warwick Castle. Fulke Greville, who was himself ennobled as Baron Brooke in 1621, spent over £20,000 (£4 million as of 2025) renovating the castle, while occupying a suite of rooms in the Watergate Tower; according to William Dugdale, a 17th-century antiquary, this made it "a place not only of great strength but extraordinary delight, with most pleasant gardens, walks and thickets, such as this part of England can hardly parallel".

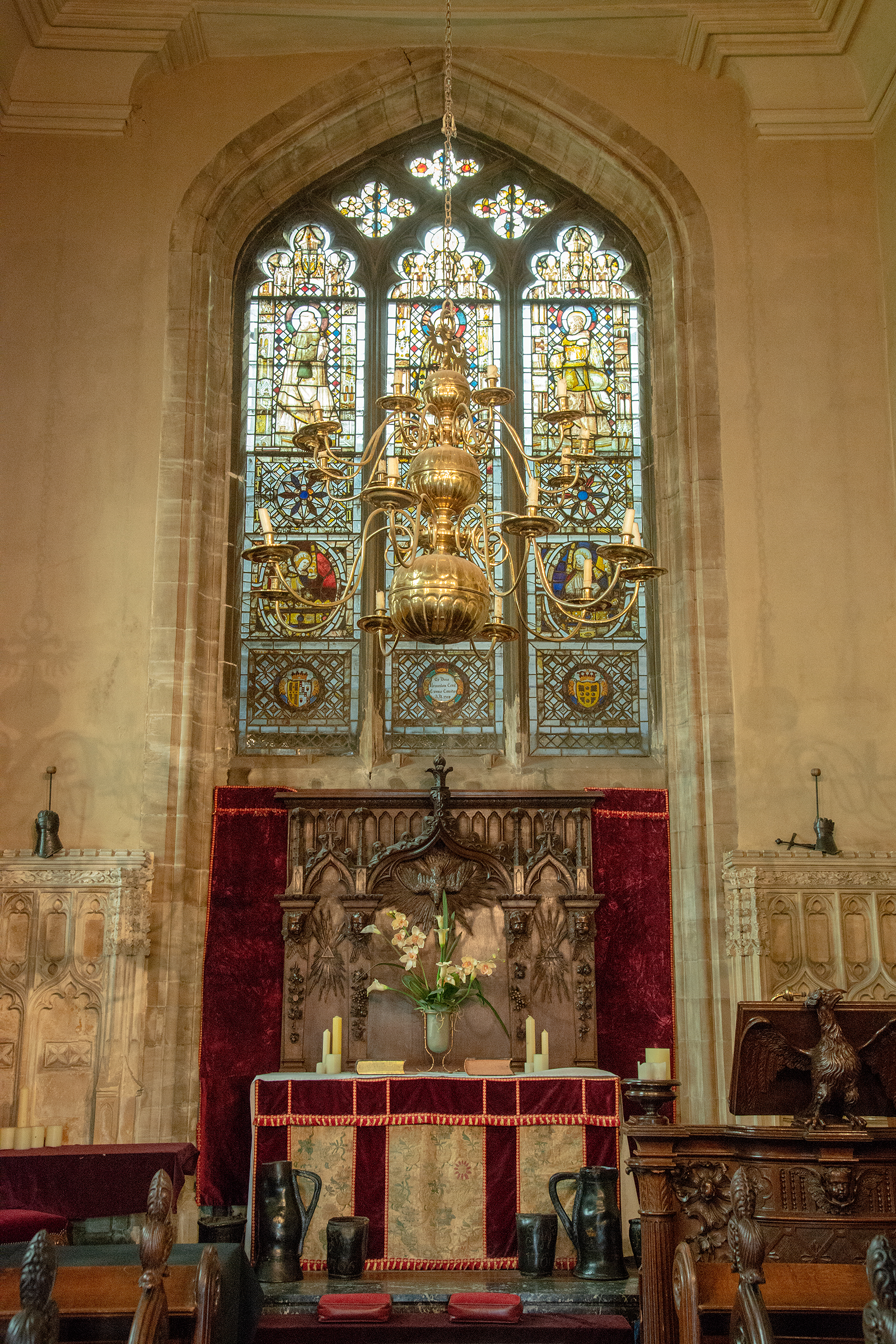
The chapel was built by Fulke Greville in the early 1600s

On 1 September 1628 Fulke Greville was murdered in Holborn by his manservant: Ralph Haywood – a "gentleman" – who stabbed the baron twice after discovering he had been omitted from mention in Greville's will. Greville died from his wounds four weeks later. The Watergate Tower, which is said to be haunted by his ghost, became known as the Ghost Tower.

Under Robert Greville, 2nd Baron Brooke, Warwick Castle's defences were enhanced from January to May 1642 in preparation for attack during the First English Civil War. The garden walls were raised, bulwarks – barricades of beams and soil to mount artillery – were constructed and gunpowder and wheels for two cannons were obtained.

Robert Greville was a Parliamentarian, and on 7 August 1642 a Royalist force laid siege to the castle. Greville was not in the castle at the time and the garrison was under the command of Sir Edward Peyto. Spencer Compton, 2nd Earl of Northampton, Lord Lieutenant of Warwickshire commanded the Royalist force. William Dugdale, acting as a herald, called for the garrison commander to surrender the castle, but he was refused. The besieging army opened fire on the castle, to little effect. According to Richard Bulstrode:

... our endeavours for taking it were to little purpose, for we had only two small pieces of cannon which were brought from Compton House, belonging to the Earl of Northampton, and those were drawn up to the top of the church steeple, and were discharged at the castle, to which they could do no hurt, but only frightened them within the castle, who shot into the street, and killed several of our men.

The siege was lifted on 23 August 1642 when the garrison was relieved by the forces of the Earl of Essex, and the Royalists were forced to retreat to Worcester. After the Battle of Edgehill in 1642 – the first pitched battle of the English Civil War – prisoners were held in Caesar's and Guy's Towers.

During the Second English Civil War prisoners were again held at the castle, including those from the Battle of Worcester in 1651. A garrison was maintained in the castle complete with artillery and supplies from 1643 to 1660, at its strongest it numbered 302 soldiers. In 1660 the English Council of State ordered the castle governor to disband the garrison and hand over the castle to Robert Greville, 4th Baron Brooke. The state apartments were found to be outmoded and in poor repair.

Under Roger and William Hurlbutt, master carpenters of Warwick, extensive modernisation of the interiors was undertaken, 1669–78. To ensure that they would be in the latest taste, William was sent to Dorset to make careful notes of the interiors recently finished at Kingston Lacy for Sir Ralph Bankes to designs by Sir Roger Pratt.

On 4 November 1695 the castle was in sufficient state to host a visit by King William III.

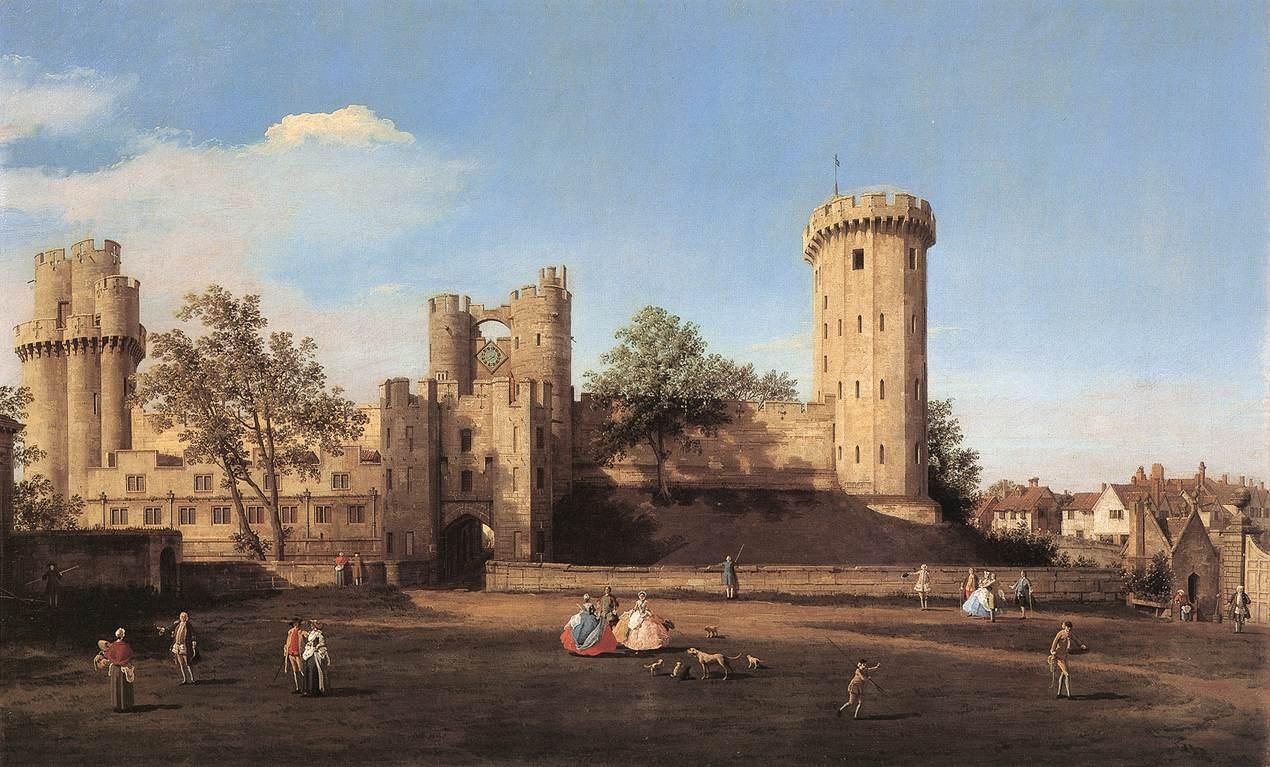
The east front of Warwick Castle from the outer court, painted by Canaletto in 1752.

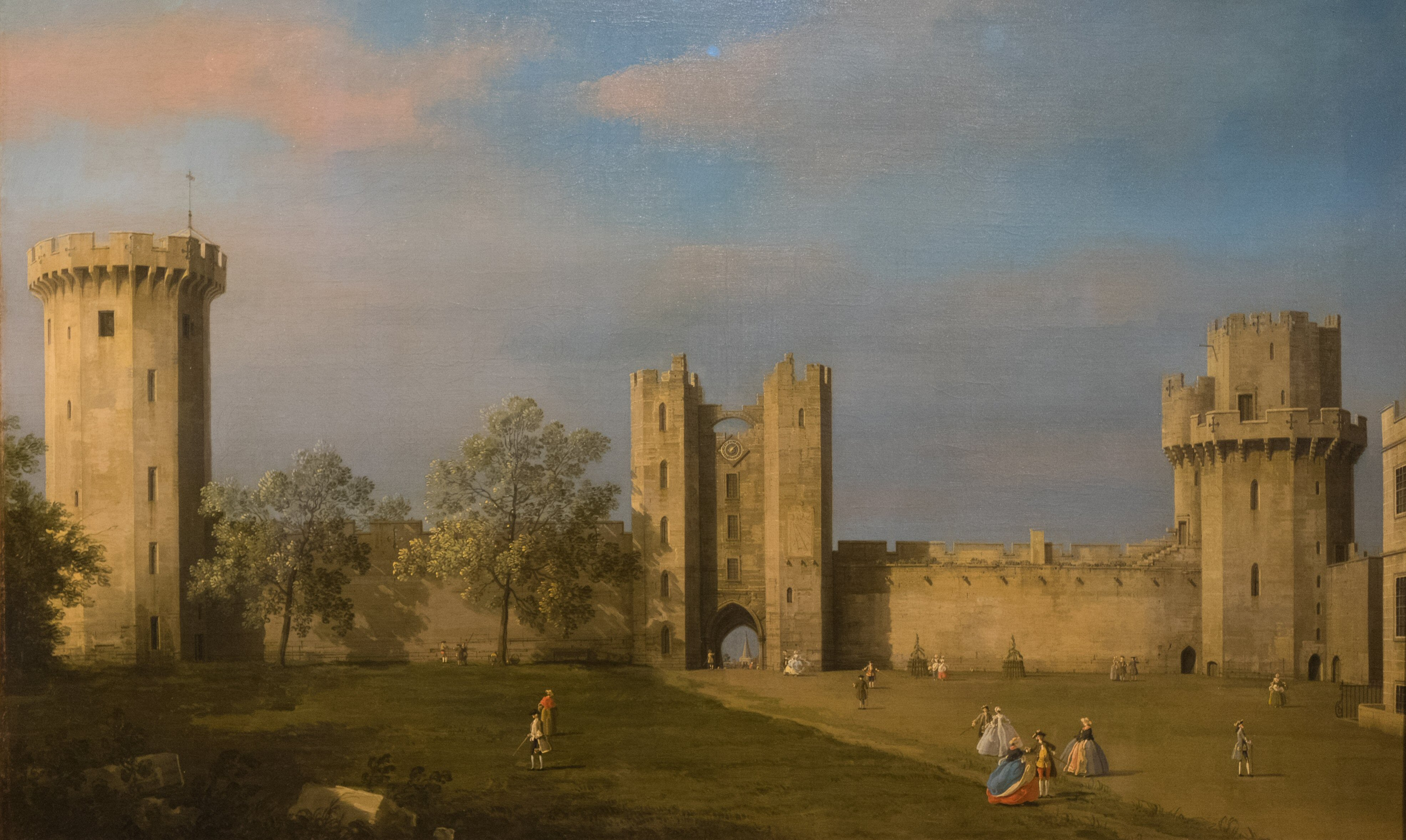
The east front of Warwick Castle from inside the courtyard, painted by Canaletto in 1752.

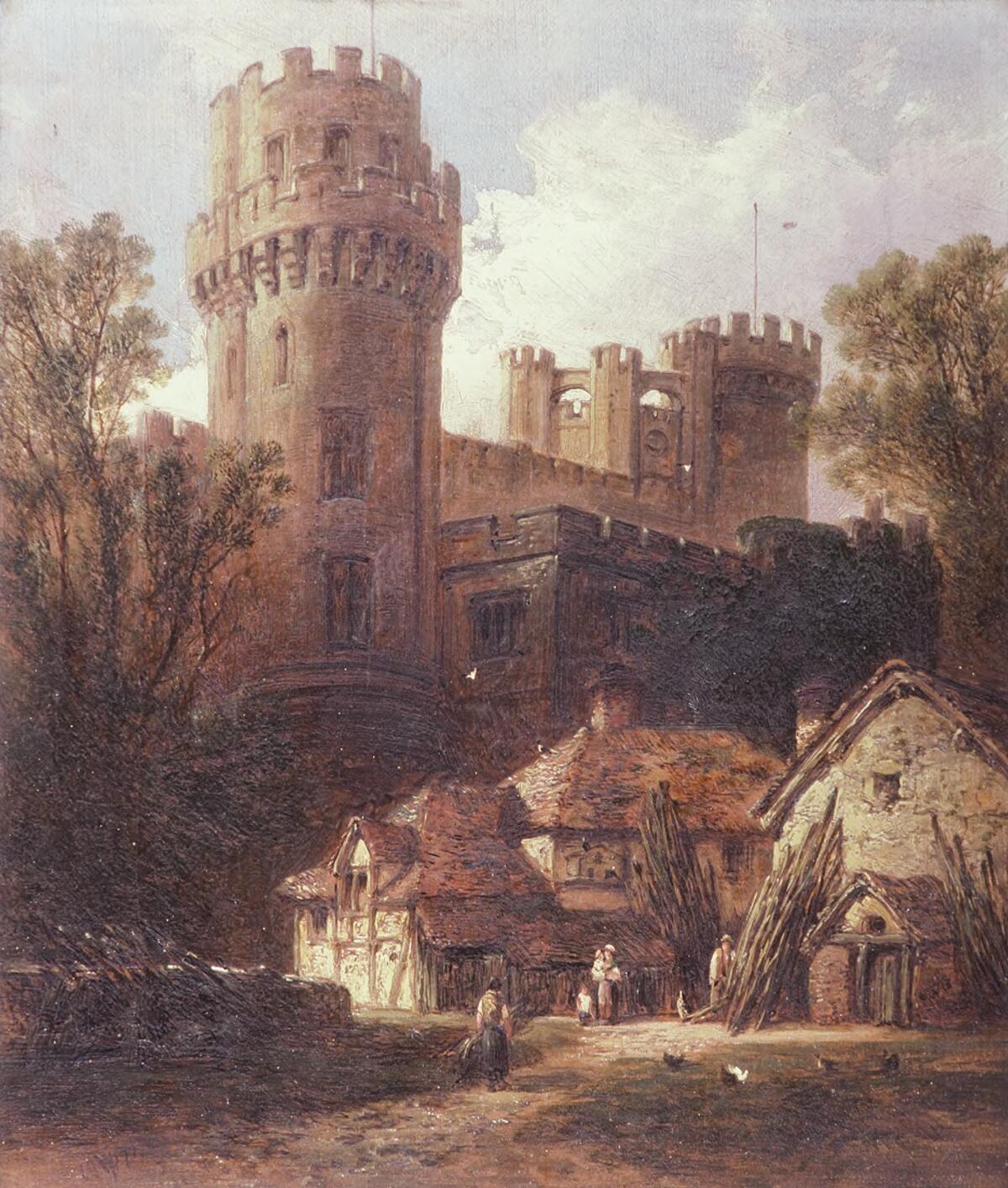
Warwick Castle, painted by William Pitt about 1870

Francis Greville, 8th Baron Brooke, undertook a renewed programme of improvements to Warwick Castle and its grounds. The 8th Baron Brooke was also bestowed with the title Earl of Warwick in 1759, the fourth creation of the title. With the recreation of the title, the castle was back in the ownership of the earls of Warwick. Daniel Garrett's work at Warwick is documented in 1748; Howard Colvin attributed to him the Gothic interior of the chapel. Lancelot "Capability" Brown had been on hand since 1749. Brown, who was still head gardener at Stowe at the time and had yet to make his reputation as the main exponent of the English landscape garden, was called in by Lord Brooke to give Warwick Castle a more "natural" connection to its river. Brown simplified the long narrow stretch by sweeping it into a lawn that dropped right to the riverbank, stopped at each end by bold clumps of native trees. A serpentine drive gave an impression of greater distance between the front gates and the castle entrance.

Horace Walpole saw Brown's maturing scheme in 1751 and remarked in a letter: "The castle is enchanting. The view pleased me more than I can express; the river Avon tumbled down a cascade at the foot of it. It is well laid out by one Brown who has set up on a few ideas of Kent and Mr Southcote."

In 1754 the poet Thomas Gray, a member of Walpole's Gothicising circle, commented disdainfully on the activity at the castle:

... he [Francis Greville] has sash'd the great apartment ... and being since told, that square sash windows were not Gothic, he has put certain whimwams withinside the glass, which appearing through are to look like fretwork. Then he has scooped out a little burrough in the massy walls of the place for his little self and his children, which is hung with paper and printed linnen, and carved chimney-pieces, in the exact manner of Berkley-square or Argyle Buildings.

Gray's mention of Argyle Buildings, Westminster, London, elicited a connotation of an inappropriately modern Georgian urban development, for the buildings in Argyll Street were a speculation to designs of James Gibbs, 1736–40.

Greville commissioned Italian painter Antonio Canaletto to paint Warwick Castle in 1747, while the castle grounds and gardens were undergoing landscaping by Brown. Five paintings and three drawings of the castle by Canaletto are known, making it the artist's most often represented building in Britain. Canaletto's work on Warwick Castle has been described as "unique in the history of art as a series of views of an English house by a major continental master". As well as the gardens, Greville commissioned Brown to rebuild the exterior entrance porch and stairway to the Great Hall. Brown also contributed Gothick designs for a wooden bridge over the Avon (1758). He was still at work on Warwick Castle in 1760. Timothy Lightoler was responsible for the porch being extended and extra rooms added adjacent to it in 1763–69. and during the same years William Lindley provided a new Dining Room and other interior alterations. In 1786–88 the local builder William Eboral was commissioned to build the new greenhouse conservatory, with as its principal ornament the Warwick Vase, recently purchased in Rome.

In 1802 George Greville, 2nd Earl of Warwick of the new creation, had debts amounting to £115,000 (£10 million as of 2025). The earl's estates, including Warwick Castle, were given to the Earl of Galloway and John FitzPatrick, 2nd Earl of Upper Ossory, in 1806, but the castle was returned to the earls of Warwick in 1813. The Great Hall was reroofed and repaired in Gothic taste in 1830–31 by Ambrose Poynter. Anthony Salvin was responsible for restoring the Watergate Tower in 1861–63.

=== The fire of 1871 ===
The castle was extensively damaged by a fire that started in the early hours of Sunday, 3 December 1871, in Lady Warwick's apartments above the library, to the east of the Great Hall. Lord and Lady Warwick were away. The flames spread rapidly, the recently restored roof fell in and the Hall and private apartments were completely destroyed. A few of the most valuable books and pictures were all that could be saved. Art treasures and valuables, including paintings by Rembrandt, Rubens and Van Dyke, were rescued from other rooms in the castle.

The alarm was raised at 2am. Two children, Eva and Sydney Greville, were snatched from their beds in a room above the dining hall by their nurse and carried to safety through smoke and flames, minutes before the main staircase collapsed. Fire brigades came from Warwick and Leamington, but efforts to fight the spread of the fire were hampered by an inadequate water supply and by the height to which it needed to be pumped. It appeared for a time that the entire castle might be lost.

Some weeks later, according to Lady Warwick (quoted in the memoirs of Mary Elizabeth Lucy of Charlecote), it was found that the fire had been started deliberately by the family's recently employed under-butler. On the Saturday, when the Warwicks were absent, he had asked the housekeeper's permission to bring a friend to show him the castle. Between them the two had stolen all items of value from the private apartments and the under-butler had started a fire to conceal the robbery.

Although the Great Hall and private apartments were gutted, the overall structure was unharmed. Restoration and reparations carried out by Salvin during 1872–75 were subsidised by donations from the public, which raised a total of £9,651 (£960,000 as of 2025).

== Advent of tourism ==
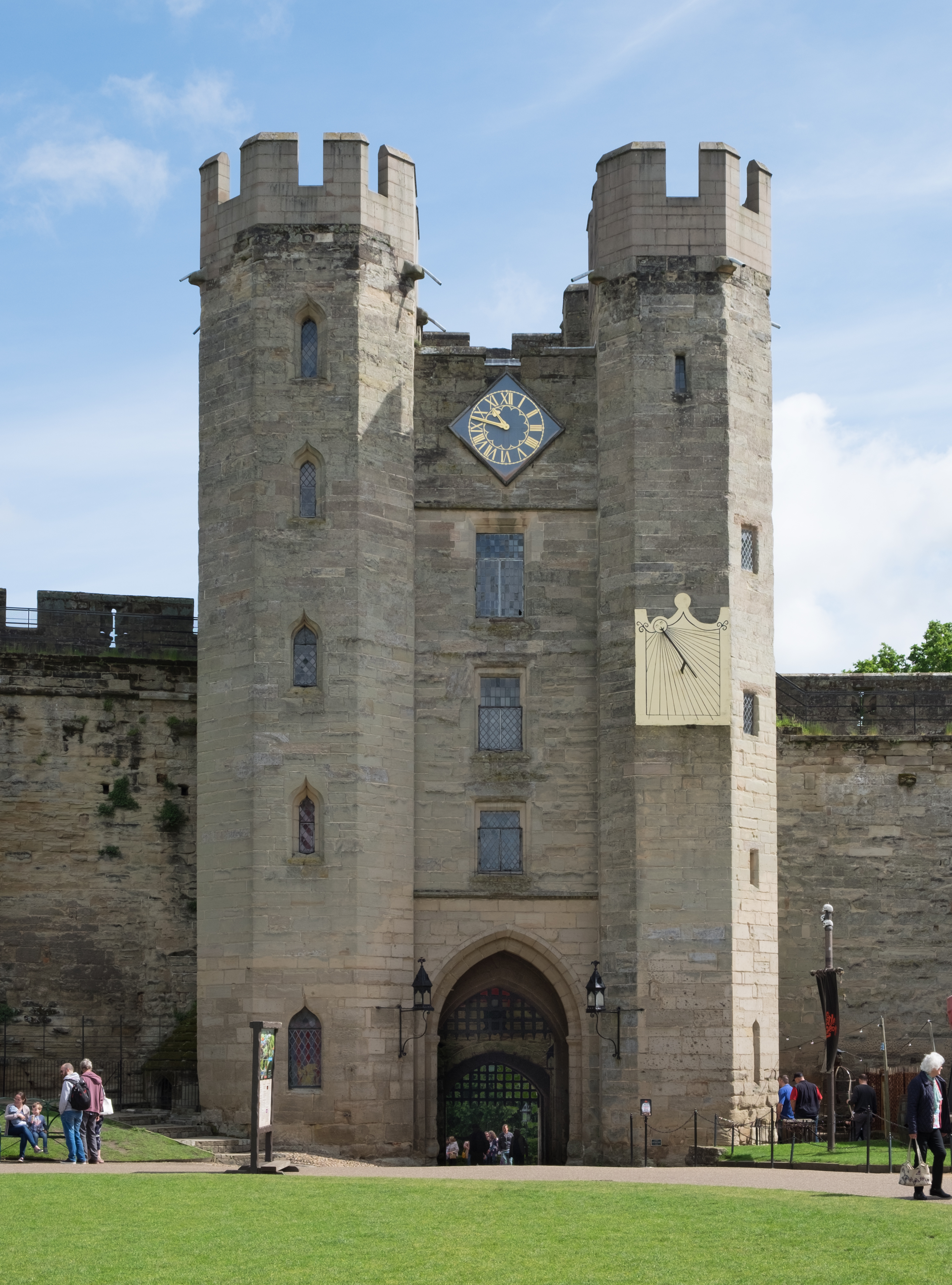
The gatehouse

Individuals had been visiting the castle since the end of the 17th century, and this grew in importance through the 19th century. In 1858, Queen Victoria visited the 4th earl, with great local celebrations. However, by 1885 it would appear the visitors were becoming a nuisance, as the earl closed the castle to visitors, causing consternation in the town. A local report stated, "One day last week eight American visitors who were staying at one of the principal hotels left somewhat hurriedly in consequence of their being unable to gain admission to the castle". It soon re-opened, again and by 1900 had a ticket office and was employing a permanent guide.

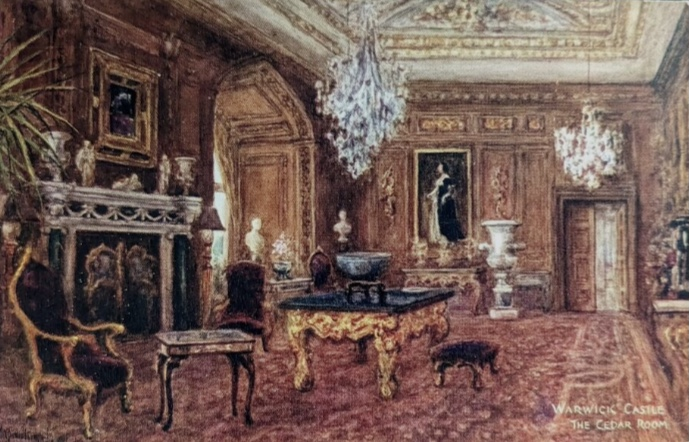
The Cedar Room by W. W. Quatremain, c. 1910

By 1936, Arthur Mee was enthusing not just that "these walls have seen something of the splendour of every generation of our [English] story", with rooms "rich in treasure beyond the dreams of avarice" but also that "their rooms are open to all who will".

In the Second World War, when nearby Coventry suffered tremendous aerial bombing, the 7th earl opened the Castle to evacuees from the city, as well as to the Ministry of Supply. It was rumoured that Nazi war criminal Rudolf Hess was held at Warwick Castle for one night while being transported from Scotland to London.

Through the 20th century, successive earls expanded the castle's tourism potential.

== Corporate ownership ==
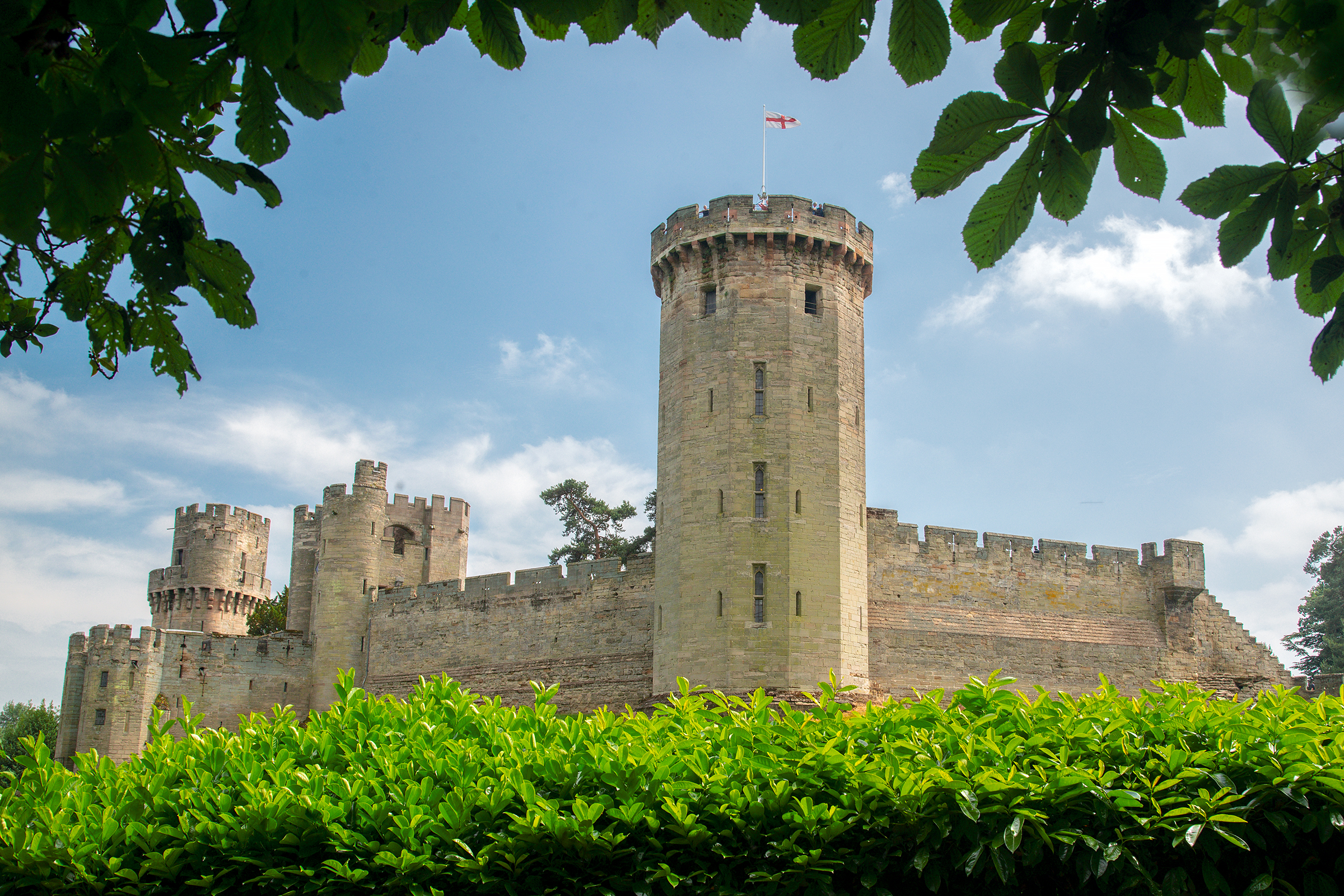
One of the first views of the castle for visitors upon entering the grounds

In 1967, Charles Greville, 7th Earl of Warwick, transferred the castle and other estates to his son and heir, Lord Brooke, who in 1978 sold the Castle to the Tussauds Group for £1,300,000. The castle had been in the Greville family for 374 years, and its sale caused a public confrontation between father and son. Guy Greville, 9th Earl of Warwick and his maternal cousin, socialite Annabelle Neilson, had spent a large period of their childhood enjoying play dates at the Castle.

Tussauds kept the castle in use mainly as a tourist attraction, while making extensive restorations to the castle and grounds. In twelve of the apartments open to tourists after the sale, wax figures of historic people are presented. Those depicted here were guests at a weekend party in 1898 hosted by Frances, Countess of Warwick; the principal guest was the Prince of Wales, later Edward VII.

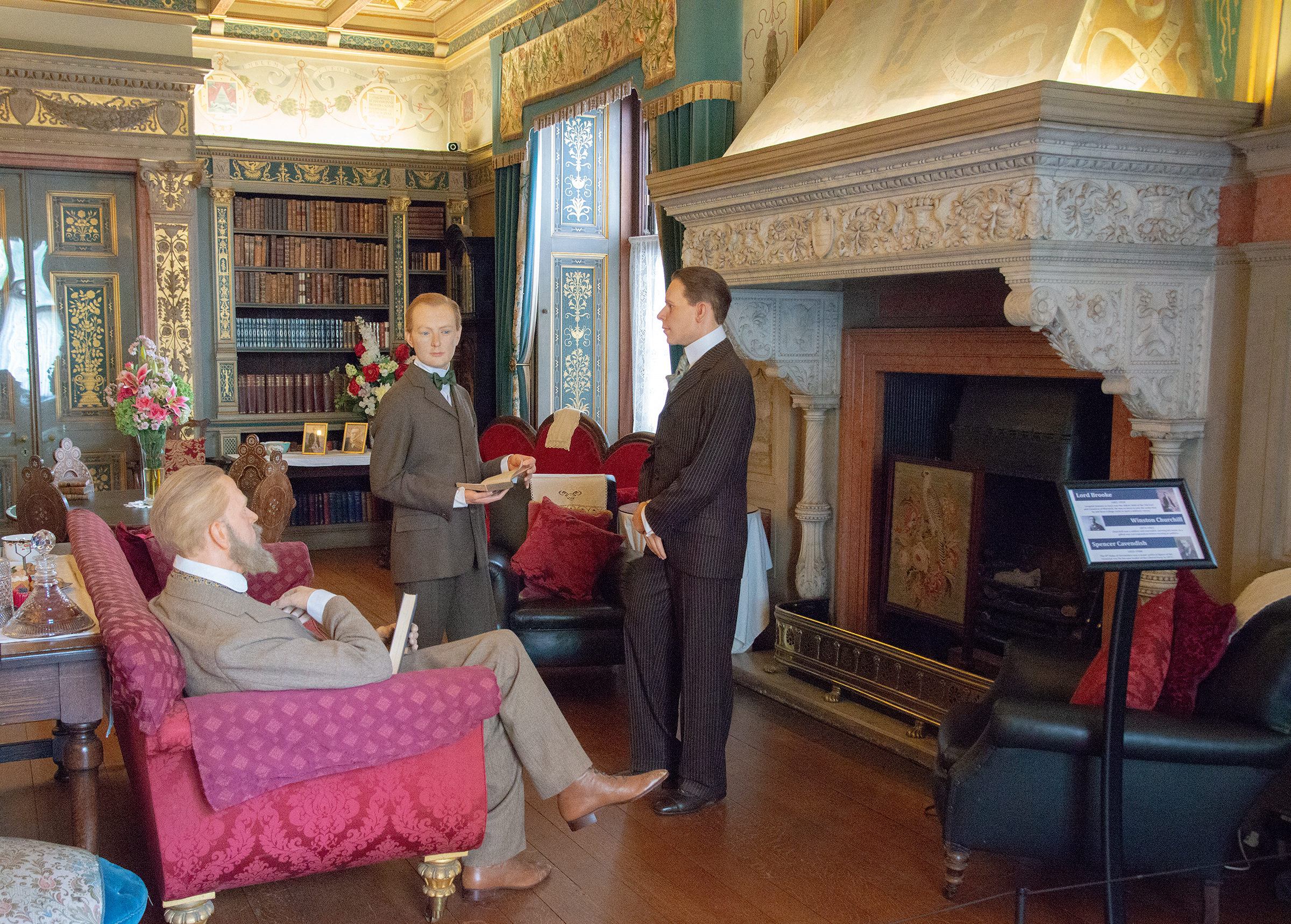
One of the groups of wax figures in the castle; Lord Brooke, a young Winston Churchill, and Spencer Cavendish

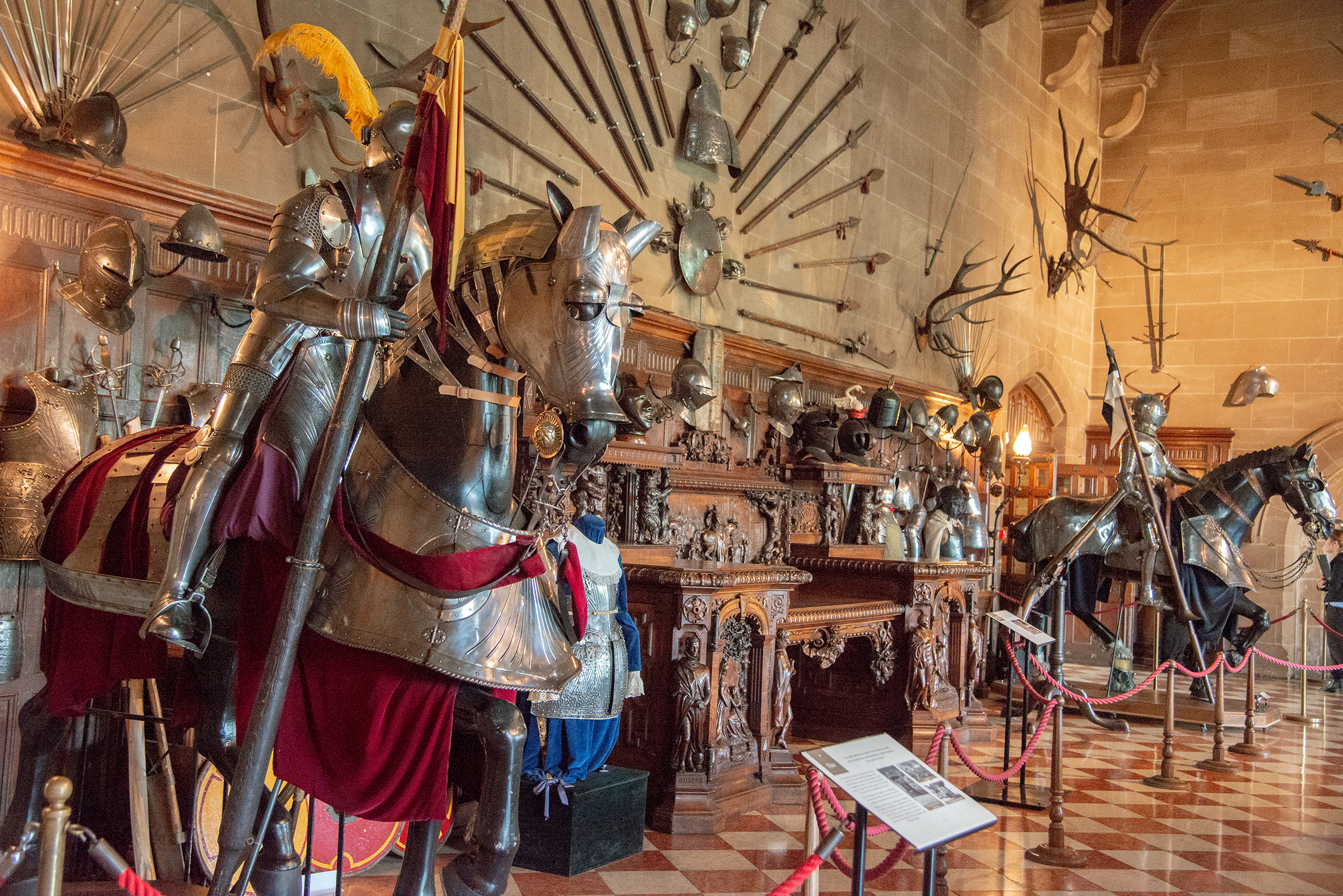
Display of armour and weaponry

The collection of armoury on display at Warwick Castle is regarded as second only to that of the Tower of London. In 2001, Warwick Castle was named one of Britain's "Top 10 historic houses and monuments" by the British Tourist Authority; the list included Tower of London, Stonehenge, and Edinburgh Castle. Warwick Castle was recognised as Britain's best castle by the Good Britain Guide 2003. Around this time it was getting more than half a million visitors a year.

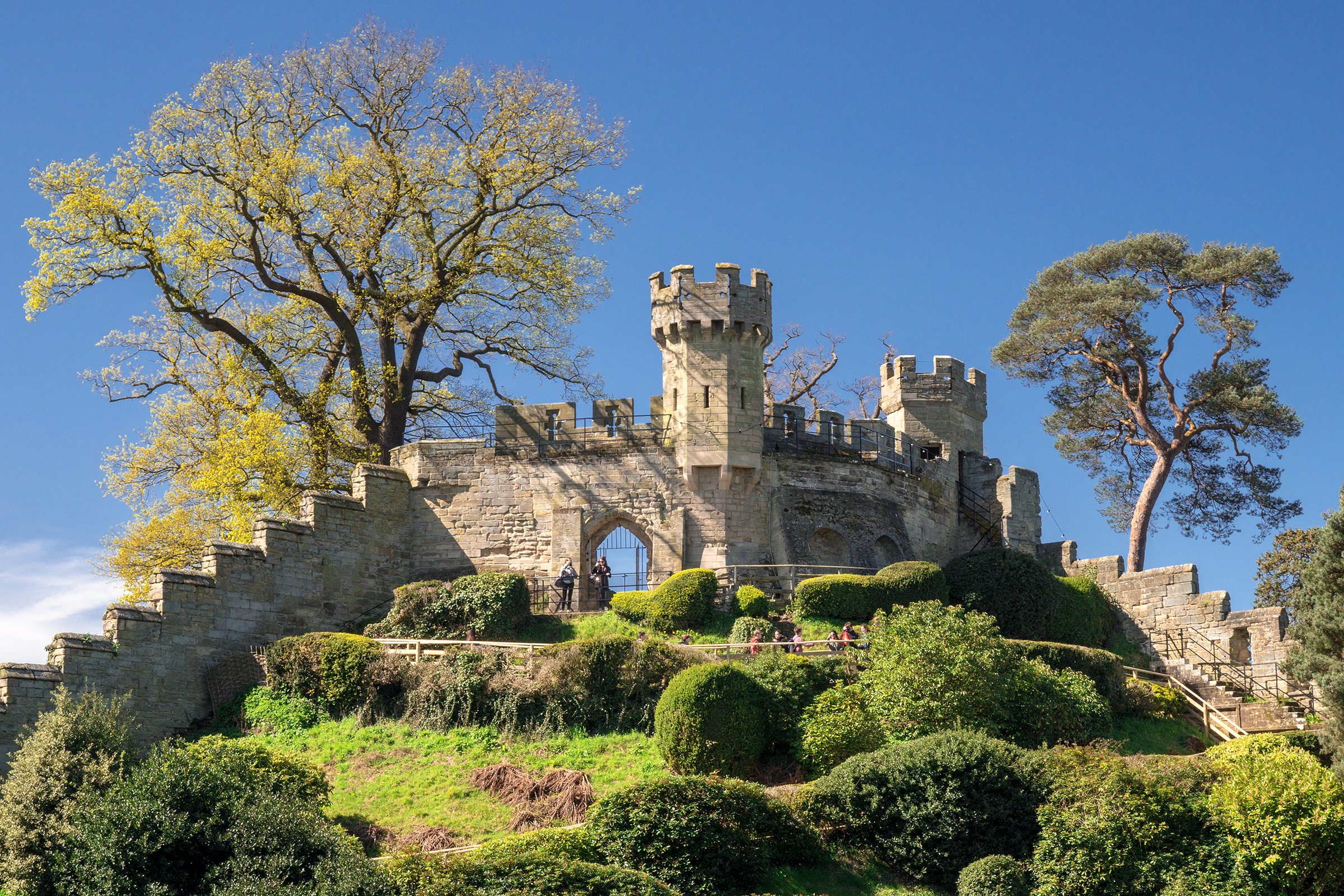
Ethelfleda's Mound

In March 2007, the Tussauds Group sold the castle to the Blackstone Inc. investment firm, and the site was then operated by Merlin Entertainments, a division of that Blackstone. In July of that year, Warwick Castle was sold again to the Prestbury Group but it continued to be operated by Merlin under a renewable 35-year lease. In December 2007, a tourist sustained fatal injuries at the castle, after falling from the Bear and Clarence Bridge into a dry moat beneath. The bridge had previously been identified as a risk and Merlin Attractions were later found guilty of breaches of health and safety regulations and were ordered to pay £350,000 in fines and costs.

=== Seasonal exhibits ===
Other tourist attractions include "Falconer's Quest'" (a bird show, featuring bald eagles, vultures, and sea eagles), archery displays, jousting, "The Trebuchet Show", and "The Sword in the Stone Show". The Castle is also home to "The Castle Dungeon", a live actor experience similar to that of "London Dungeons". Warwick Castle is the subject of many ghost stories, including that of Fulke Greville who is said to haunt the Watergate Tower despite having been murdered in Holborn. The castle's reputation for being haunted is used as a tourist attraction with events such as "Warwick Ghosts Alive", a live-action show telling the story of Fulke Greville's murder. Musical events at the castle have included carolling, with performances by bands such as the Royal Spa Brass.

At times during Summer 2018, the castle offered its War of the Roses event with jousting and other activities. On certain dates in August, Dragon Slayer evenings were scheduled, with dining, a projection light show, pyrotechnics, fire jousting, and live action stunts.

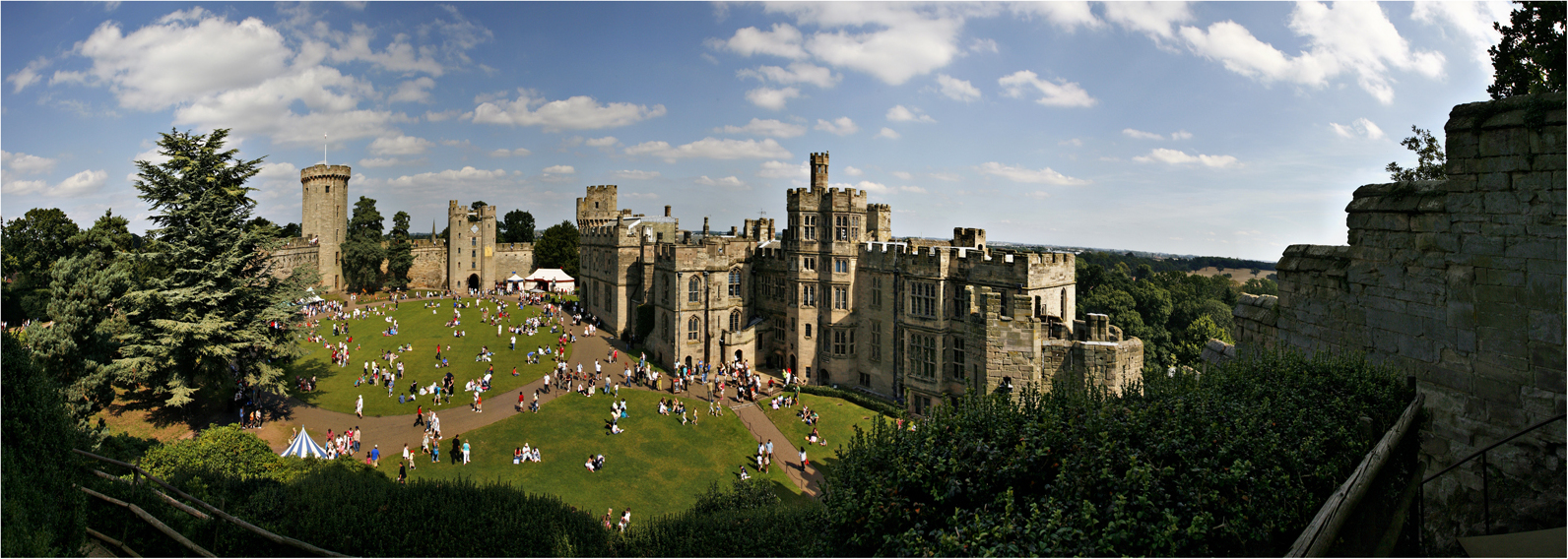
Warwick Castle as viewed from Ethelfleda's Mound in 2007.

=== Heritage protection ===
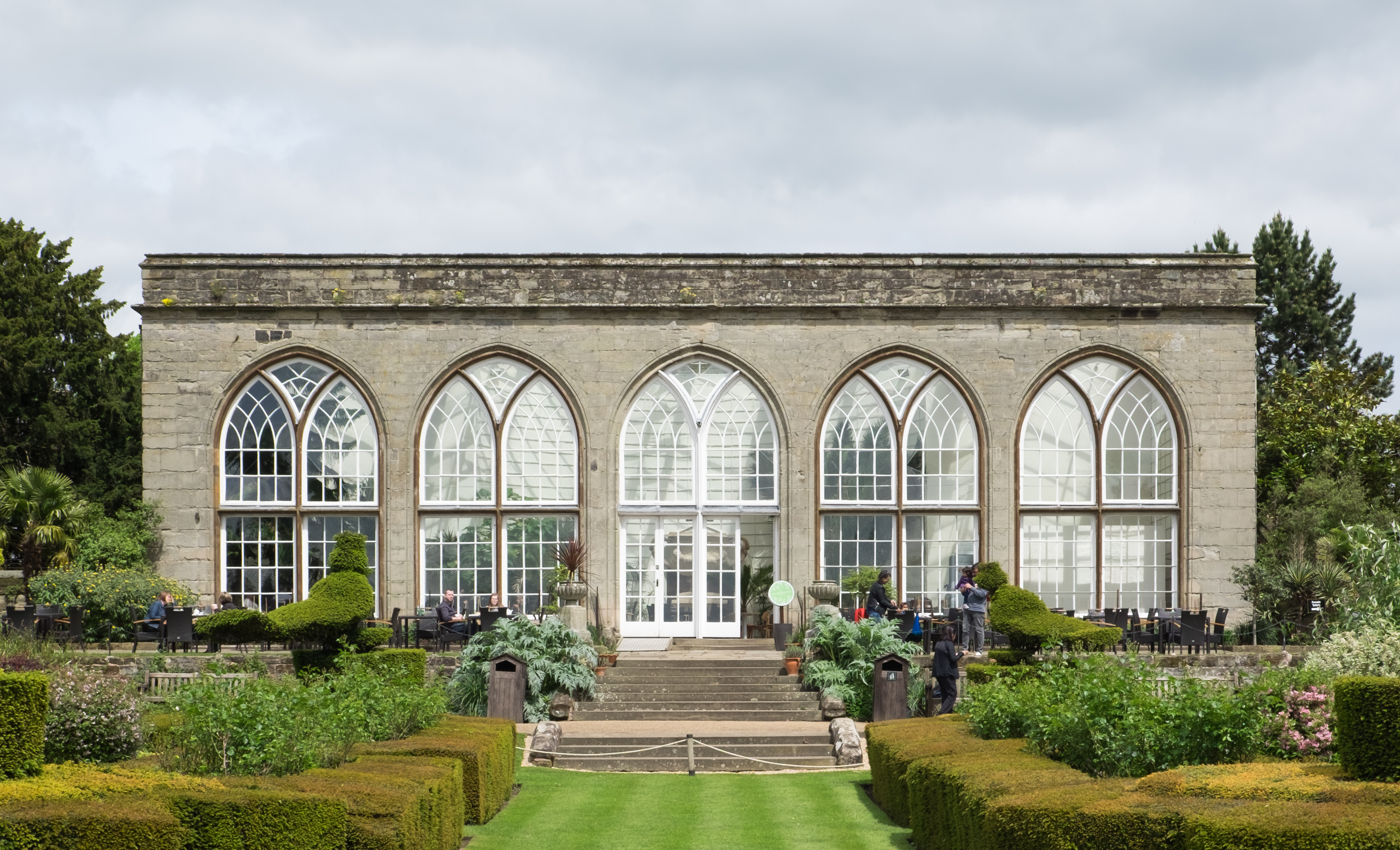
The conservatory in 2017

The castle is protected against unauthorised change as a scheduled monument in recognition of its status as a "nationally important" archaeological site or historic building, and is a Grade I listed building together with its boundary walls, stables, conservatory, mill and lodge.

On 23 June 2006, a £20,000 stained glass window was damaged by teenage vandals and a ceremonial sword stolen, recovered soon after.

=== Warwick Castle trebuchet ===
In June 2005, Warwick Castle became home to one of the world's largest working siege engines. The trebuchet is 18 metres (59 ft) tall, made from over 300 pieces of oak and weighs 22 tonnes (21.7 long tons; 24.3 short tons). It sits on the riverbank below the castle.

The machine was built with drawings from the Danish living history museum Middelaldercentret, who, in 1989, were the first to recreate a fully functioning trebuchet. It was built in Wiltshire with expertise from the Danish museum.

The trebuchet takes eight men half an hour to load and release. The process involves four men running in 4 metres (13 ft) tall treadwheels to lift the counterweight, weighing 6 tonnes (5.9 long tons; 6.6 short tons), into the air. It is designed to be capable of hurling projectiles of up to 150 kilograms (330 lb) distances of up to 300 metres (980 ft) and as high as 25 metres (82 ft).

On 21 August 2006, the trebuchet claimed the record as the most powerful siege engine of its type when it sent a projectile weighing 13 kilograms (29 lb) a distance of 249 metres (817 ft) at a speed of 195 kilometres per hour (121 mph), beating the previous record held by the trebuchet at Middelaldercentret in Denmark.

On 10 April 2015 a thatched boathouse caught fire shortly after a burning cannonball was fired by the trebuchet. It was reported that a spark from the cannonball had started the blaze although a castle spokeswoman said the cause had not yet been established. Hundreds of tourists were evacuated from the castle, but the spokeswoman said they were not at any risk. The Daily Telegraph described the boathouse as "historic", "medieval" and dating to 1896, when the 5th Earl had it built to house an electric boat.

The trebuchet was decommissioned in 2020 due to safety concerns, and was deconstructed and replaced with a comparable trebuchet in 2023.

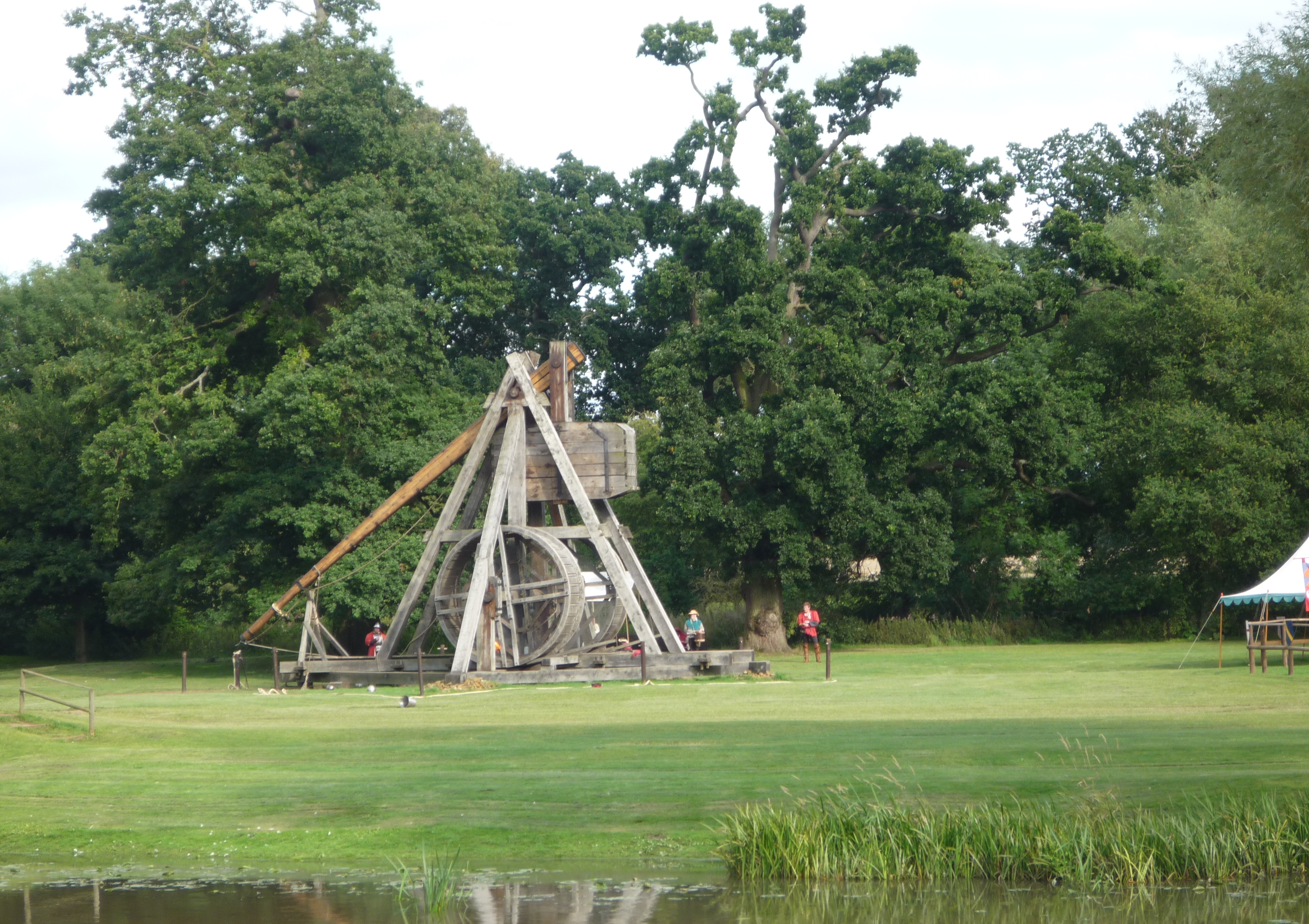
The Warwick Castle trebuchet is currently the largest one in the world (2009)

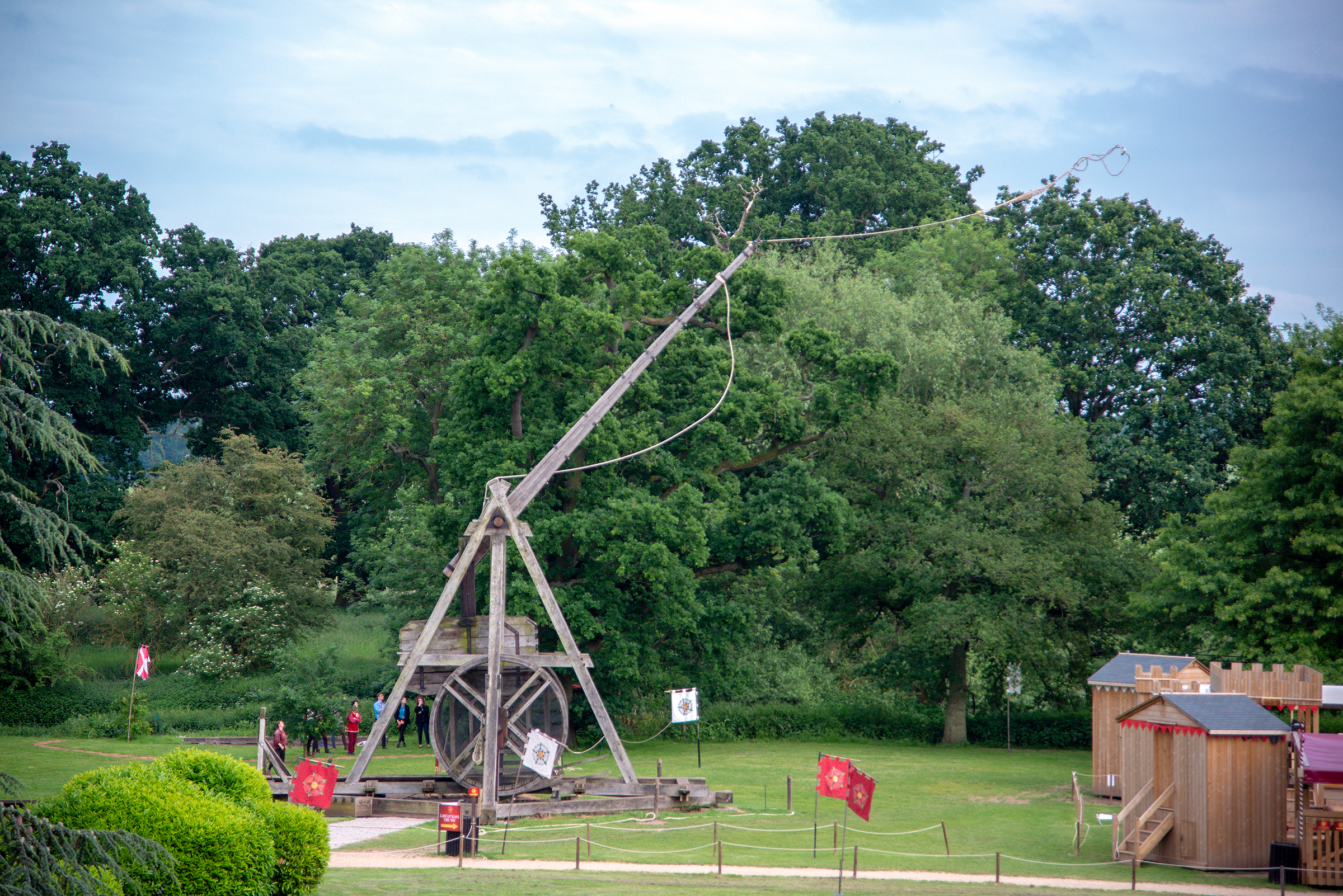
It was reconstructed based on 13th-century drawings, and functions properly (2018)

2012 demonstration of the Warwick Castle trebuchet (launch at 10:30)

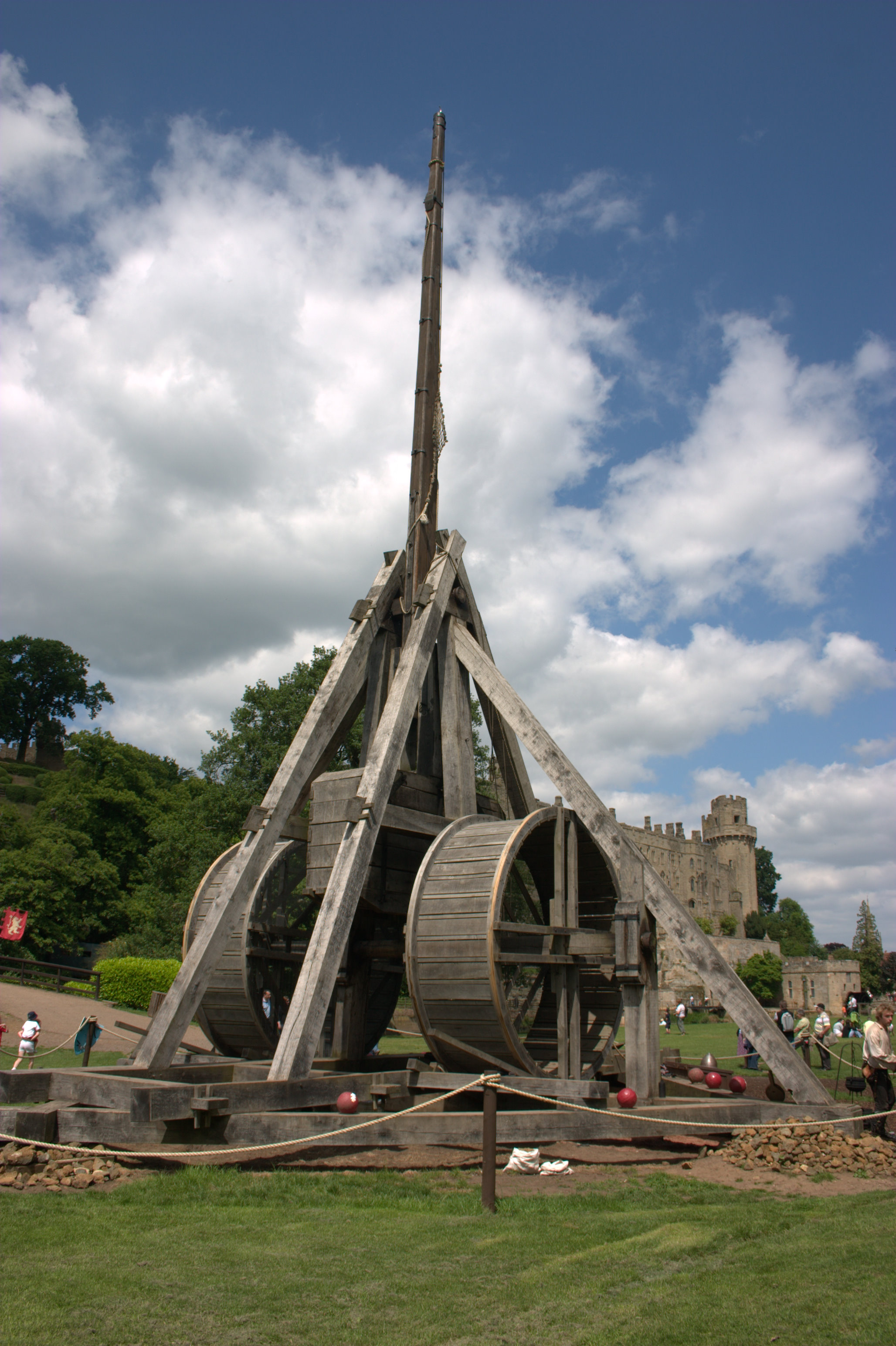
Warwick Castle trebuchet from the rear (2010)

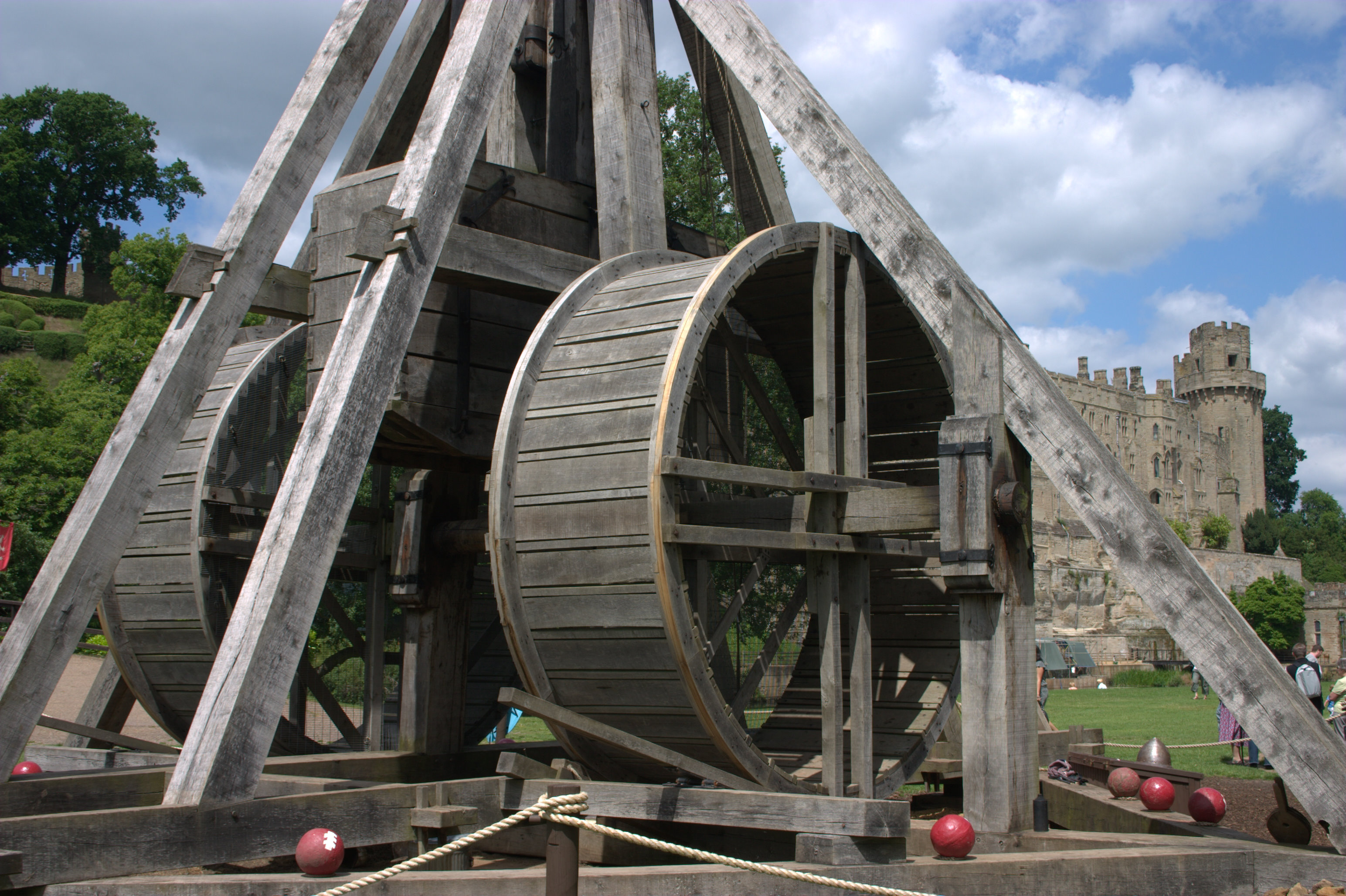
Close up of the walking cage on the trebuchet (2010)

== Layout ==
Plan of Warwick Castle

The current castle, built in stone during the reign of King Henry II, is on the same site as the earlier Norman motte-and-bailey castle. A keep used to stand on the motte which is on the south west of the site, although most of the structure now dates from the post-medieval period. In the 17th century the motte was landscaped with the addition of a path. The bailey was incorporated into the new castle and is surrounded by stone curtain walls.

When Warwick Castle was rebuilt in the reign of King Henry II it had a new layout with the buildings against the curtain walls. The castle is surrounded by a dry moat on the northern side where there is no protection from the river or the old motte; the perimeter of the walls is 130 metres (140 yd) long by 82 metres (90 yd) wide. The two entrances to castle are in the north and west walls. There was originally a drawbridge over the moat in the north east. In the centre of the north west wall is a gateway with Clarence and Bears towers on either side; this is a 15th-century addition to the fortifications of the castle. The residential buildings line the eastern side of the castle, facing the River Avon. These buildings include the great hall, the library, bedrooms, and the chapel.

== Owners ==
Over its 950 years of history Warwick Castle has been owned by 36 different individuals, plus four periods as crown property under seven different monarchs. It was the family seat of three separate creations of the Earls of Warwick, and has been a family home for members of the Beaumont, Beauchamp, Neville, Plantagenet, Dudley and Greville families. The first creation of the Earldom specifically included the right of inheritance through the female line, so the castle three times had a woman (or girl) as the owner. Eleven of the owners were under 20 when they inherited, including a girl aged two and a boy aged three. At least three owners died in battle, two were executed and one murdered. Every century except the 21st has seen major building work or adaptations at the castle.

== Grounds, park, accommodations ==
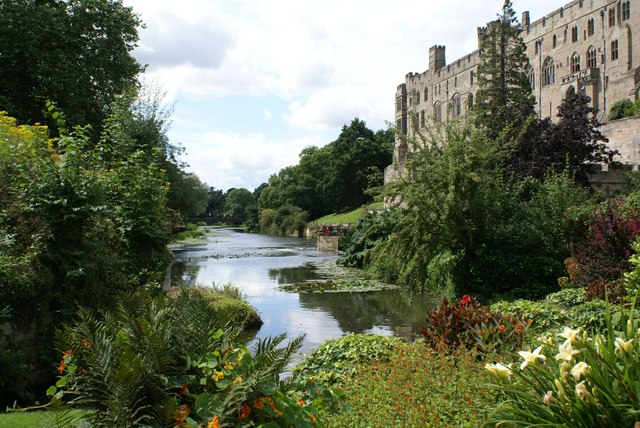
View of Warwick Castle from The Mill Garden, which is privately owned, but open to the public

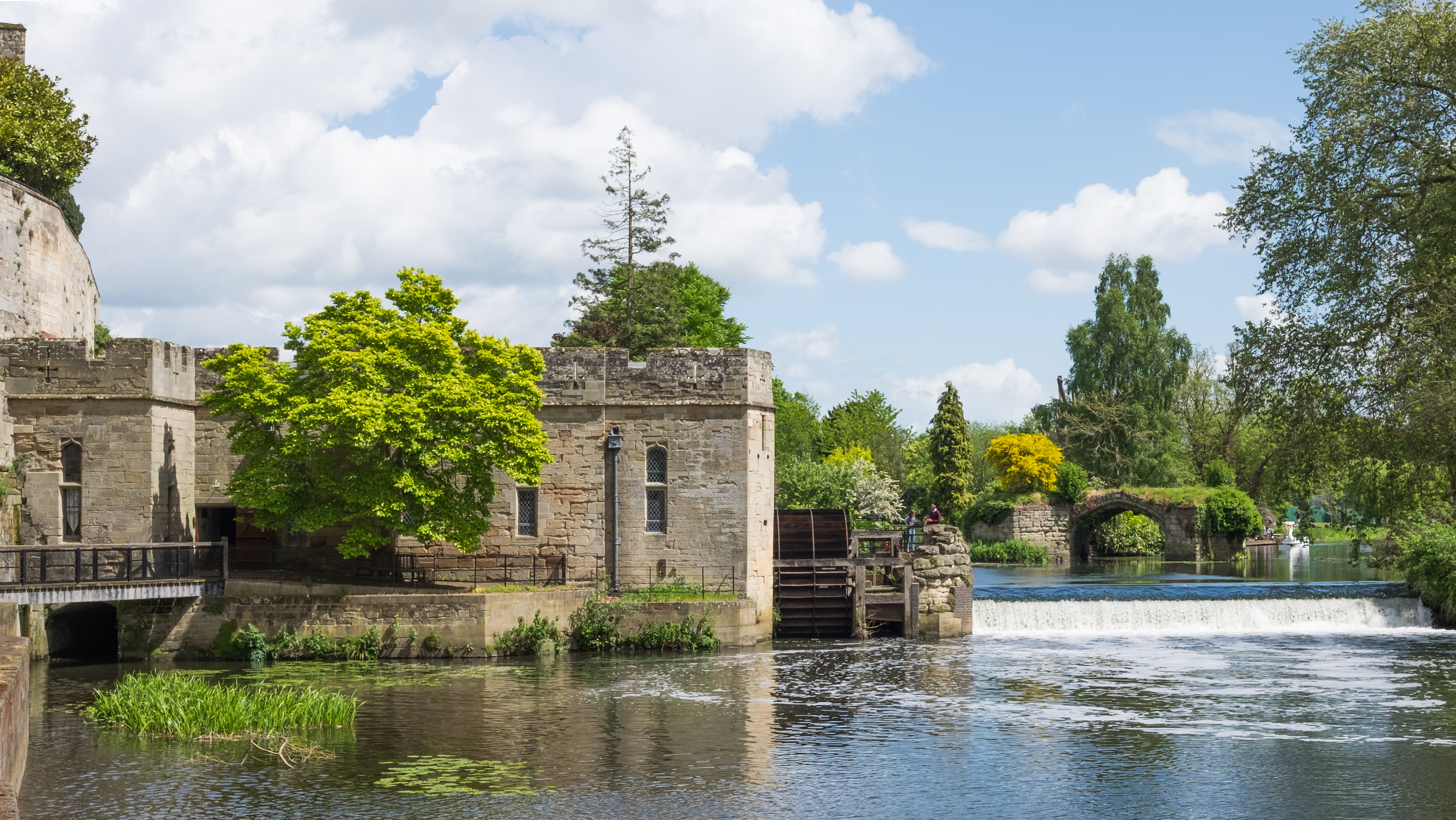
The water-powered engine room used for the generation of electricity from 1894 until 1940, built on the site of the former flour mill

Formal gardens belonging to Warwick Castle were first recorded in 1534. Landscaping in the 17th century added spiral paths to the castle motte during Fulke Greville's programme of restoration. Francis Greville commissioned Capability Brown to re-landscape the castle grounds; he began working on the grounds and park in 1749 and had completed his work by 1757, having spent about £2,293 (£360,000 as of 2025). on the project. The gardens cover 2.8 square kilometres (690 acres). Robert Marnock created formal gardens in the castle's grounds in 1868–69.

Started in 1743 and originally known as Temple Park, Castle Park is located to the south of the castle. Its original name derived from the Knights Templar, who used to own a manor in Warwick. Houses around the perimeter of the park were demolished and the land they stood on incorporated into the park. Attempts to make profits from the park in the late 18th century included leasing it for grazing, growing wheat, and keeping sheep.

A water-powered mill in the castle grounds was probably built under Henry de Beaumont, 1st Earl of Warwick. By 1398 the mill had been relocated to just outside the eastern castle walls, on the west bank of the River Avon. Both mills were subject to flooding. By 1644, an engine house had been added to the mill. The mill was reused as an electricity generating plant after it had stopped being used to grind, but once Warwick Castle was fitted with mains electricity in 1940, the mill was no longer required and was dismantled in 1954.

The latest option at the castle is glamping, overnight stays in nicely decorated tents in an area labelled Knight's Village. The units include no cooking facilities, so the fee for the stay includes a buffet dinner and a breakfast. The previously introduced accommodations in timber lodges also remain available in the Woodland Hideaway area.

== See also ==
- Castles in Great Britain and Ireland
- Kenilworth Castle
- List of castles in England
- List of owners of Warwick Castle
- Old Castle Bridge - ruined medieval bridge adjacent to the castle
