= Royal Spa Brass =

England brass band

Royal Spa Brass is a brass band in the town of Royal Leamington Spa, Warwickshire, England.

== Early history ==
The original Royal Spa Brass (newspapers give the name as Royal Spa Band) was founded by Alfred Titcomb on 15 January 1901 and, by the end of the year, had 26 players. In January 1912 it became the band of the Warwickshire Yeomanry but continued to appear as Royal Spa Band for another two years. It was dissolved during the First World War and reformed in 1920 and continued until 1939 when it ceased again.

Fifteen years later it re-formed by an amalgamation of Kenilworth Town and Bishops Itchington brass bands using the name "The Royal Leamington Spa Silver Band". The band was wound up again in 1970 but soon restarted in 1973. According to the band's official history, it reverted to its original name of Royal Spa Brass in 1992, and has since concentrated on Concert rather than Contest performance.

The band had considerable success during its Contest days, winning the Third section and then Second section of the Midland Area Championships, and reaching the National Finals.

== New millennium ==
The Band's headquarters is called The Band Factory. It has played in conjunction with annual caroling events at Warwick Castle. In December 2011, for example, the band played at Warwick Castle alongside the choirs of the Collegiate Church of St Mary.

In 2006, two musicians marked fifty years in the band. Conductor Paul Russell and baritone player Ken Owen both joined the group in 1956, and were still playing a half century later.

According to its official history, Royal Spa Band continues to be a non-auditioning band that welcomes players of all abilities. In 2008, Buddin' Brass was officially set up for young and adult beginners. Since the inception of Buddin' Brass, many of its members have made the move into the main band.

In early 2011, Hugh Rashleigh took over as musical director, supervising both Buddin' Brass and the rest of the Band.

The band accepts musicians of any age, and practice once a week.
