= 1789 in literature =

This article contains information about the literary events and publications of 1789.

== Events ==
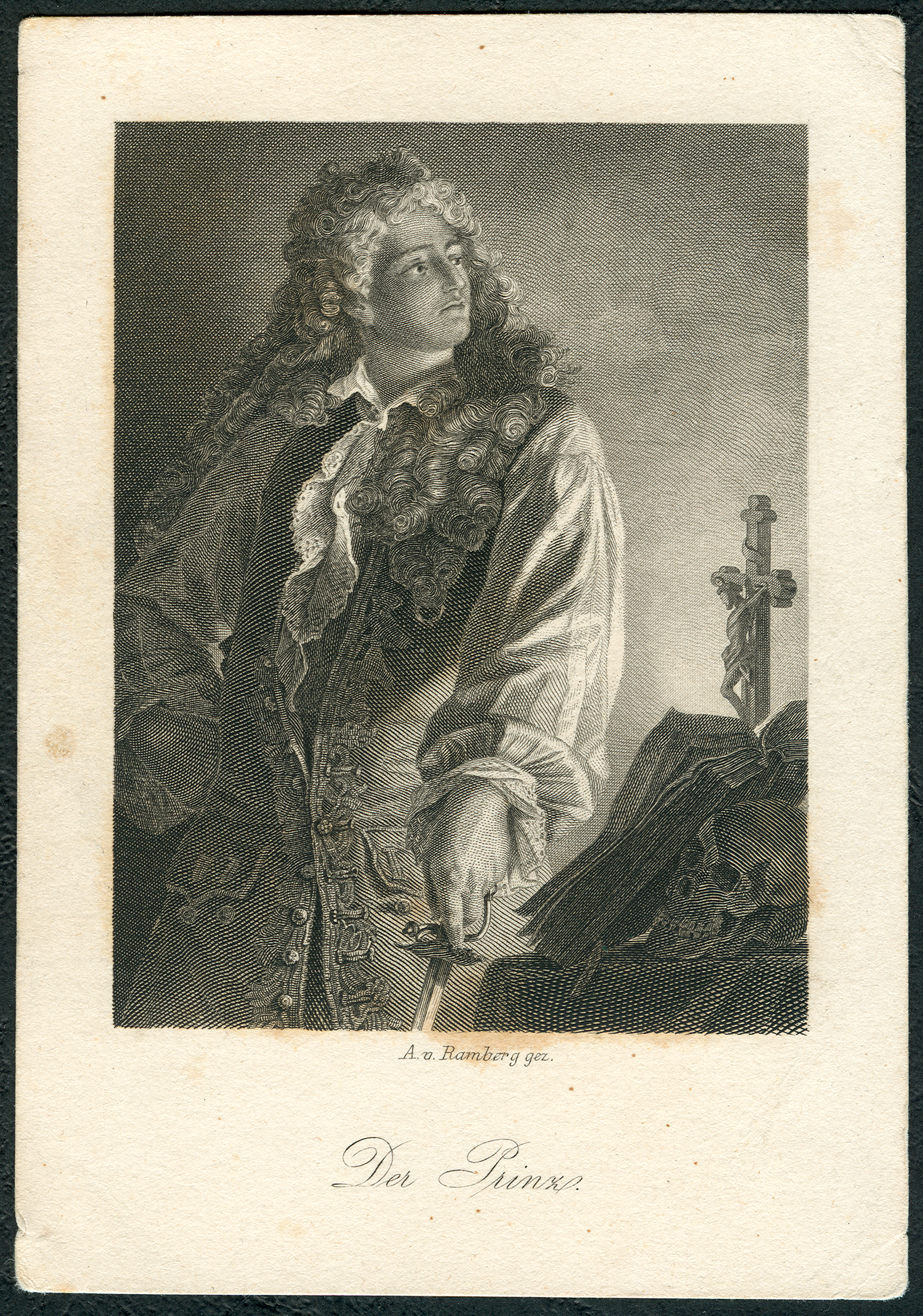
An 1859 engraving of the protagonist of The Ghost-Seer

- January 22 – William Hill Brown's anonymous sentimental epistolary novel The Power of Sympathy: or, The Triumph of Nature, usually considered the first American novel, is published in Boston.
- February 7 – Première of John Philip Kemble's production of Shakespeare's Coriolanus with himself in the title rôle and his sister Sarah Siddons as Volumnia, at the Theatre Royal, Drury Lane in London.
- May 21 – Tomás António Gonzaga is arrested for complicity in the Inconfidência Mineira in Brazil.
- May 26 – Friedrich Schiller gives his first lecture as professor of history and philosophy at Jena.
- November 1 – Robert Burns informs friends that he has been appointed an exciseman in Scotland.
- December – Première of Olympe de Gouges's abolitionist play Zamore et Mirza (written 1784; published 1788) as L'Esclavage des nègres ("Slavery of the negroes"); shut down after three performances.
- December 24 – The literary Thomas de Mahy, marquis de Favras (born 1744) is arrested by radicals of the French Revolution, charged with plotting to help Louis XVI and Marie Antoinette escape from the country. When convicted of treason and handed his official death sentence by the court clerk, he reads it, shakes his head and says: "I see you have made three spelling mistakes."
- December 28 – Première of Anton Tomaž Linhart's comedy Županova Micka ("Micka, the Mayor's Daughter", an adaptation of Joseph Richter's Die Feldmühle), the first theatrical work in Slovene.
- unknown dates
  - Publication in Calcutta of Sir William Jones's Śacontalā, or the fatal ring: an Indian drama, a translation of Kālidāsa's 4th/5th century play Abhijñānaśākuntalam, the first translation of a classical Indian drama into a Western language.
  - The Children's Magazine, the first American periodical for children, is published in Hartford, Connecticut. It lasts only three months.

== New books ==
=== Fiction ===
- Elizabeth Bonhôte – Darnley Vale, or, Emelia Fitzroy
- William Hill Brown – The Power of Sympathy.
- Richard Cumberland – Arundel
- Ann Radcliffe – The Castles of Athlin and Dunbayne
- Friedrich Schiller – The Ghost-Seer (Der Geisterseher), publication concluded
- James White – Earl Strongbow

=== Children ===
- François Guillaume Ducray-Duminil – Petit Jacques et Georgette, ou les Petits montagnards auvergnats (Little Jacques and Georgette, or the Little Mountain Dwellers of Auvergne)

=== Drama ===
- George Colman
  - The Battle of Hexham
  - The Family Party
- Henry Seymour Conway – False Appearances
- Richard Cumberland – The School for Widows
- William Hayley – Marcella
- Elizabeth Inchbald – The Married Man
- John O'Keeffe –The Toy
- Frederick Reynolds – The Dramatist
- John St John – Mary, Queen of Scots
- Ann Yearsley – Earl Goodwin

=== Poetry ===
- William Blake – Songs of Innocence
- William Lisle Bowles – Sonnets
- Erasmus Darwin – The Loves of the Plants

=== Non-fiction ===
- Jeremy Bentham – An Introduction to the Principles of Morals and Legislation (publication year, printed in 1780)
- Olaudah Equiano – The Interesting Narrative of the Life of Olaudah Equiano
- Emmanuel Joseph Sieyès – What Is the Third Estate? (Qu'est-ce que le tiers-état?)

== Births ==
- January 11 – John Payne Collier, English Shakespearean critic and forger (died 1883)
- May 28 – Bernhard Severin Ingemann, Danish historical novelist, playwright and poet (died 1862)
- September 1 – Marguerite Gardiner, Countess of Blessington, Irish novelist and literary hostess (died 1849)
- November 15 – James Scholefield, English classical scholar (died 1853)
- September 15 – James Fenimore Cooper, American novelist (died 1851)
- December 28 – Catharine Sedgwick, American novelist (died 1867)

== Deaths ==
- January 21 – Baron d'Holbach, German-born French author, philosopher and encyclopedist (born 1723)
- January 23 – John Cleland, English novelist, biographer and translator (born 1709)
- May 21 – Sir John Hawkins, English writer and biographer (born 1719)
- June 28 – John Walters, Welsh poet (born 1760)
- October 19 – Lucretia Wilhelmina van Merken, Dutch poet and playwright (born 1721)
