= 1789 =

1789 in various calendars
- Gregorian calendar: 1789; MDCCLXXXIX
- Ab urbe condita: 2542
- Armenian calendar: 1238; ԹՎ ՌՄԼԸ
- Assyrian calendar: 6539
- Balinese saka calendar: 1710–1711
- Bengali calendar: 1195–1196
- Berber calendar: 2739
- British Regnal year: 29 Geo. 3 – 30 Geo. 3
- Buddhist calendar: 2333
- Burmese calendar: 1151
- Byzantine calendar: 7297–7298
- Chinese calendar: 戊申年 (Earth Monkey); 4486 or 4279 — to — 己酉年 (Earth Rooster); 4487 or 4280
- Coptic calendar: 1505–1506
- Discordian calendar: 2955
- Ethiopian calendar: 1781–1782
- Hebrew calendar: 5549–5550
- Hindu calendars
- Vikram Samvat: 1845–1846
- Shaka Samvat: 1710–1711
- Kali Yuga: 4889–4890
- Holocene calendar: 11789
- Igbo calendar: 789–790
- Iranian calendar: 1167–1168
- Islamic calendar: 1203–1204
- Japanese calendar: Tenmei 9 / Kansei 1 (寛政元年)
- Javanese calendar: 1715–1716
- Julian calendar: Gregorian minus 11 days
- Korean calendar: 4122
- Minguo calendar: 123 before ROC 民前123年
- Nanakshahi calendar: 321
- Thai solar calendar: 2331–2332
- Tibetan calendar: ས་ཕོ་སྤྲེ་ལོ་ (male Earth-Monkey); 1915 or 1534 or 762 — to — ས་མོ་བྱ་ལོ་ (female Earth-Bird); 1916 or 1535 or 763

July 14: Storming of the Bastille takes place in the French Revolution.

1789 (MDCCLXXXIX) was a common year starting on Thursday of the Gregorian calendar and a common year starting on Monday of the Julian calendar, the 1789th year of the Common Era (CE) and Anno Domini (AD) designations, the 789th year of the 2nd millennium, the 89th year of the 18th century, and the 10th and last year of the 1780s decade. As of the start of 1789, the Gregorian calendar was 11 days ahead of the Julian calendar, which remained in localized use until 1923.

== Events ==
French Revolution: June 20: Tennis Court Oath, drawing by David.

=== January–March ===
- January – Emmanuel Joseph Sieyès publishes the pamphlet What Is the Third Estate? (Qu'est-ce que le tiers-état?), influential on the French Revolution.
- January 7 – The 1788-89 United States presidential election and House of Representatives elections are held.
- January 9 – Treaty of Fort Harmar: The terms of the Treaty of Fort Stanwix (1784) and the Treaty of Fort McIntosh, between the United States Government and certain native American tribes, are reaffirmed, with some minor changes.
- January 21 – The first American novel, The Power of Sympathy or the Triumph of Nature Founded in Truth, is printed in Boston, Massachusetts. The anonymous author is William Hill Brown.
- January 23 – Georgetown University is founded in Georgetown, Maryland (part of modern-day Washington, D.C.), as the first Roman Catholic college in the United States.
- January 29 – In Vietnam, Emperor Quang Trung crushes the Chinese Qing forces in Ngọc Hồi-Đống Đa. It is considered one of the greatest victories in Vietnamese military history.
- February 4 – George Washington is unanimously elected the first president of the United States, by the United States Electoral College.
- February 21 – King Gustav III enforces the Union and Security Act, delivering the coup de grace to Sweden's 70-year-old parliamentarian system, in favor of absolute monarchy.
- March
  - The first version of a graphic description of a slave ship (the Brookes) is issued on behalf of the English Society for Effecting the Abolition of the Slave Trade.
  - In Southern Africa, the Second Xhosa War between the Xhosa people and European settlers begins.
- March 4 – At Federal Hall in New York City, the 1st United States Congress meets, and declares the new United States Constitution to be in effect. The bicameral United States Congress replaces the unicameral Congress of the Confederation, as the legislature of the federal government of the United States.
- March 10 – In Japan, the Menashi–Kunashir rebellion begins between the Ainu people and Japanese.
- March 11 – The Venetian arsenal on the island of Corfu, containing 72,000 pounds (33,000 kg) of gunpowder and 600 bombshells, explodes during a fire, killing 180 bystanders and knocking down a seawall.

=== April–June ===
- April 1 – At Federal Hall, the United States House of Representatives attains its first quorum, and elects congressman Frederick Muhlenberg as the first Speaker of the House.
- April 6 – At Federal Hall, the United States Senate attains its first quorum, and elects John Langdon of Pennsylvania as its first president pro tempore. Later that day, the Senate and the House of Representatives meet in joint session for the first time, and the electoral votes of the first U.S. presidential election are counted. General George Washington is certified as president-elect, and John Adams is certified as vice-president elect.
- April 7 – Selim III (1789–1807) succeeds Abdul Hamid I (1773–1789) as Ottoman Sultan.
- April 21 – John Adams takes office as the first vice president of the United States, and begins presiding over the United States Senate.

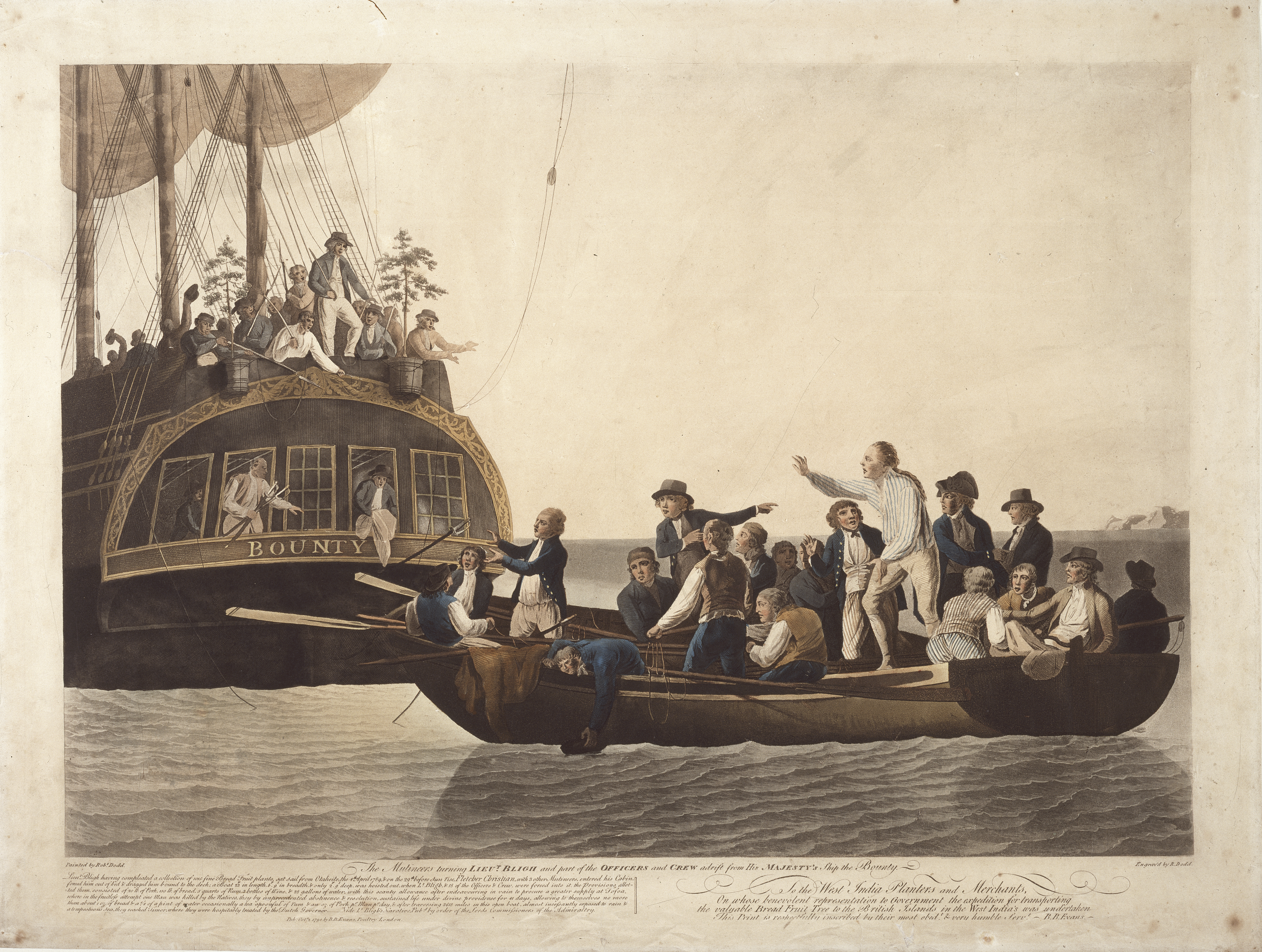
April 28: Mutiny on the Bounty.

- April 28 – Mutiny on the Bounty: Fletcher Christian leads the mutiny on the British Royal Navy ship HMS Bounty against Captain William Bligh, in the Pacific Ocean.

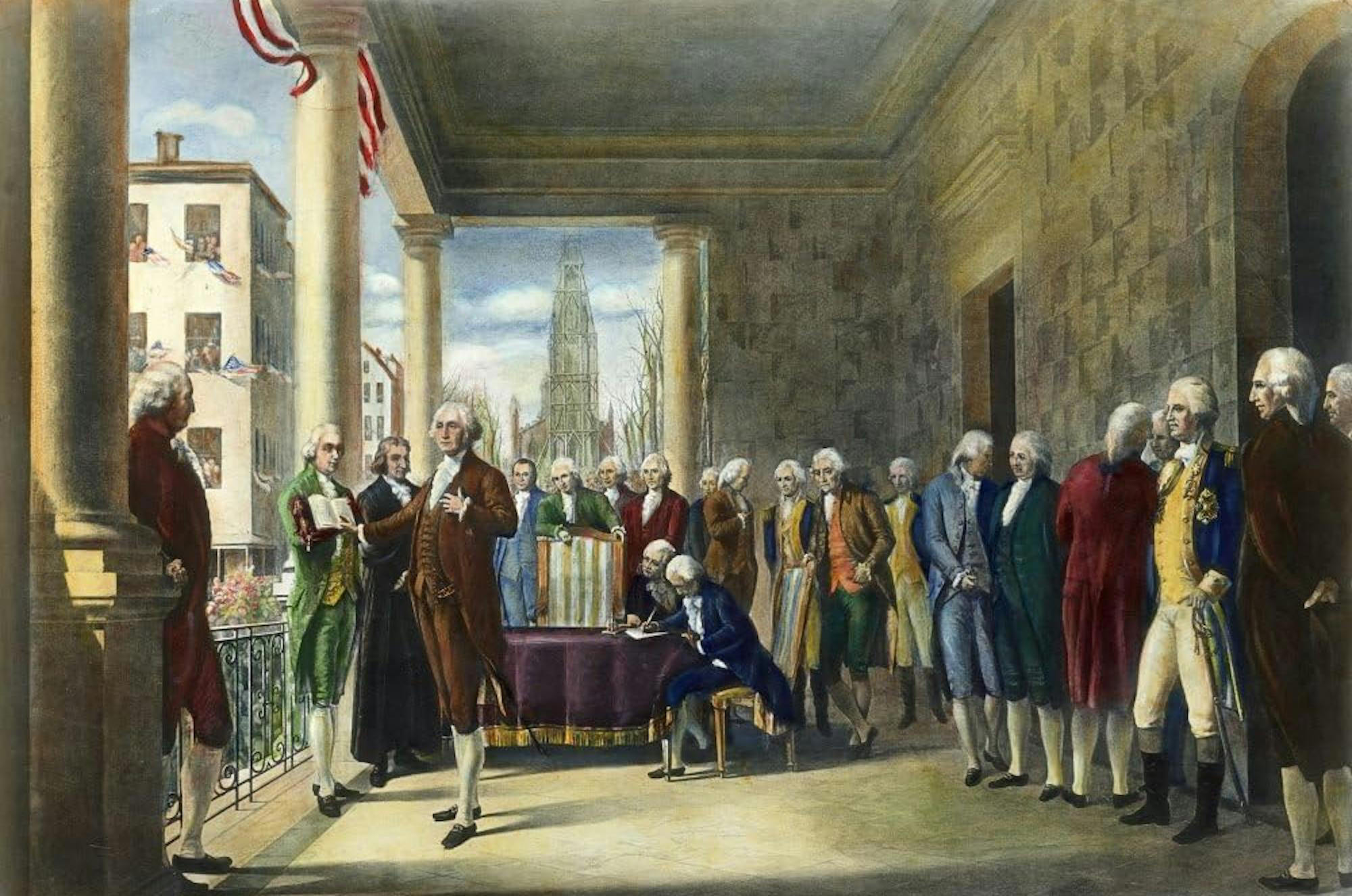
April 30: George Washington, inaugurated as the first president of the United States.

- April 30 – George Washington is inaugurated at Federal Hall in New York City, beginning his term as the first president of the United States.
- May 5 – In France, the Estates-General convenes for the first time in 175 years, taken as the start of the French Revolution (1789–1799).
- June – The Inconfidência Mineira is the first attempt at Brazilian independence from Portugal.
- June 17 – In France, representatives of the Third Estate at the Estates-General declare themselves the National Assembly.
- June 20 – The Tennis Court Oath is taken in Versailles.
- June 23 – Louis XVI of France makes a conciliatory speech urging reforms to a joint session, and orders the three estates to meet together.

=== July–September ===
- July
  - An estimated 150,000 of Paris's 600,000 people are without work.
  - Storofsen flood in Norway.
- July 1 – The comic ballet La fille mal gardée, choreographed by Jean Dauberval, is first presented under the title Le ballet de la paille, at the Grand Théâtre de Bordeaux, at Bordeaux, France.
- July 4 – The U.S. Congress passes its first bill, the Tariff of 1789, setting out tariffs.
- July 9
  - At Versailles, the National Assembly reconstitutes itself as the National Constituent Assembly, and begins preparations for what will become the French Constitution of 1791.
  - The Theatre War officially ends in Scandinavia.
- July 10 – Alexander Mackenzie reaches the Mackenzie River Delta.
- July 11 – Louis XVI of France dismisses popular Chief Minister Jacques Necker.
- July 12 – An angry Parisian crowd, inflamed by a speech from journalist Camille Desmoulins, demonstrates against the King's decision to dismiss Minister Necker.
- July 13 – The people begin to seize arms for the defense of Paris.
- July 14
  - French Revolution: Storming of the Bastille – Citizens of Paris storm the fortress of the Bastille, and free the only seven prisoners held. In rural areas, peasants attack the manors of the nobility.
  - Survivors of the mutiny on the Bounty, including Captain William Bligh and 18 others, reach Timor after a nearly 4,000-mile (6,400 km) journey in an open boat.
- July 27 – The first agency of the Federal government of the United States under the new Constitution, the Department of Foreign Affairs (on September 15 renamed the Department of State), is established.
- August 4 – In France, members of the Constituent Assembly take an oath to end feudalism and abandon their privileges.
- August 7 – The United States Department of War is established.
- August 18 – The Liège Revolution breaks out in the Prince-Bishopric of Liège.
- August 21 – A proposal for a Bill of Rights is adopted by the United States House of Representatives.
- August 24 – The first naval battle of the Svensksund begins in the Gulf of Finland.
- August 26 – The Declaration of the Rights of Man and of the Citizen is proclaimed in France by the Constituent Assembly.
- August 28 – William Herschel discovers Enceladus, one of Saturn's moons.
- September 2 – The United States Department of the Treasury is founded.
- September 11 – Alexander Hamilton is appointed as the first United States Secretary of the Treasury.
- September 22
  - Russo-Turkish War (1787–92) – Battle of Rymnik: Alexander Suvorov roundly defeats 100,000 Turks.
  - The United States Department of the Post Office is established.
- September 24 – The Judiciary Act of 1789 establishes the federal judiciary, and the United States Marshals Service.
- September 25 – The United States Congress proposes a set of 12 amendments to the U.S. Constitution, for ratification by the states. Ratification for 10 of these proposals is completed on December 5, 1791, creating the United States Bill of Rights.
- September 26 – Thomas Jefferson, U.S. Minister to France, is appointed as the first U.S. Secretary of State.
- September 29 – The U.S. Department of War establishes the nation's first regular army, with a strength of several hundred men.

=== October–December ===
- October 5 – Women's March on Versailles: Some 7,000 women march 12 miles (19 km) from Paris to the royal Palace of Versailles to demand action over high bread prices.
- October 10 – Physician Joseph-Ignace Guillotin proposes to the French National Assembly the adoption of more humane and egalitarian forms of capital punishment, including use of the guillotine.
- October 24 – Brabant Revolution: Brabant revolutionaries cross the border from the Dutch Republic into the Austrian Netherlands; the first public reading of the Manifesto of the People of Brabant declares the independence of the Austrian Netherlands.
- October 27 – Battle of Turnhout: The Austrian army is beaten by Brabant revolutionaries.
- November 2 – Decree on the goods of the clergy placed at the disposal of the Nation passed by the National Constituent Assembly.
- November 6 – Pope Pius VI creates the first diocese in the United States at Baltimore, and appoints John Carroll the first Roman Catholic bishop in the United States.
- November 20 – New Jersey ratifies the United States Bill of Rights, the first state to do so.
- November 21 – North Carolina ratifies the United States Constitution, and becomes the 12th U.S. state.
- November 26 – A national Thanksgiving Day is observed in the United States, as recommended by President George Washington and approved by Congress.
- December 11 – The University of North Carolina, the oldest public university in the United States, is founded.
- December 23 – A leaflet circulated in France accuses the Marquis de Favras of plotting to rescue the royal family.

=== Date unknown ===
- Joseph II, Holy Roman Emperor, decrees that all peasant labor obligations be converted into cash payments.
- The Qajar dynasty establish themselves as rulers in Iran.
- The Traité Élémentaire de Chimie (Elementary Treatise of Chemistry), an influential chemistry textbook by Antoine Lavoisier, is published; translated into English in 1790, it comes to be considered the first modern chemical textbook.
- German chemist Martin Heinrich Klaproth discovers the element uranium, while studying the mineral pitchblende.
- The Bengal Presidency first establishes a penal colony, in the Andaman Islands.
- Famine in Ethiopia.
- Thomas Jefferson returns from Europe, bringing the first macaroni machine to the United States.
- Influenced by Benjamin Rush's argument against the excessive use of alcohol, about 200 farmers in a Connecticut community form a temperance movement in the United States.
- Fort Washington (Cincinnati, Ohio) is built to protect early U.S. settlements in the Northwest Territory.
- Former slave Olaudah Equiano's autobiography The Interesting Narrative of the Life of Olaudah Equiano, one of the earliest published works by a black writer, is published in London.
- Peggy of Castletown, Isle of Man, the world's oldest surviving private yacht, is built.
- The pedal-powered tricycle is invented by two Frenchmen, Blanchard and Maguier.

== Births ==
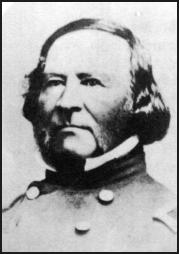
René Edward De Russy

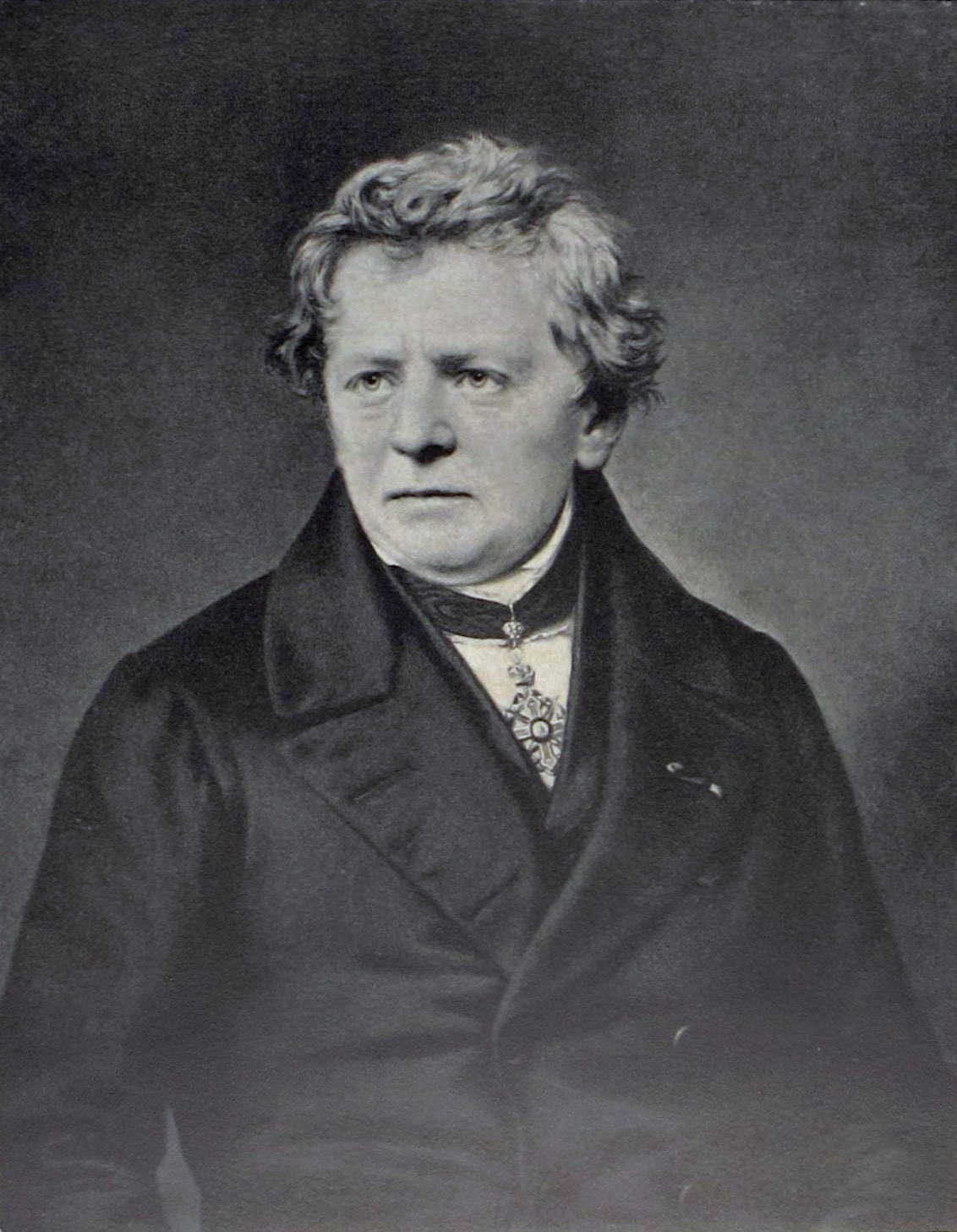
Georg Ohm

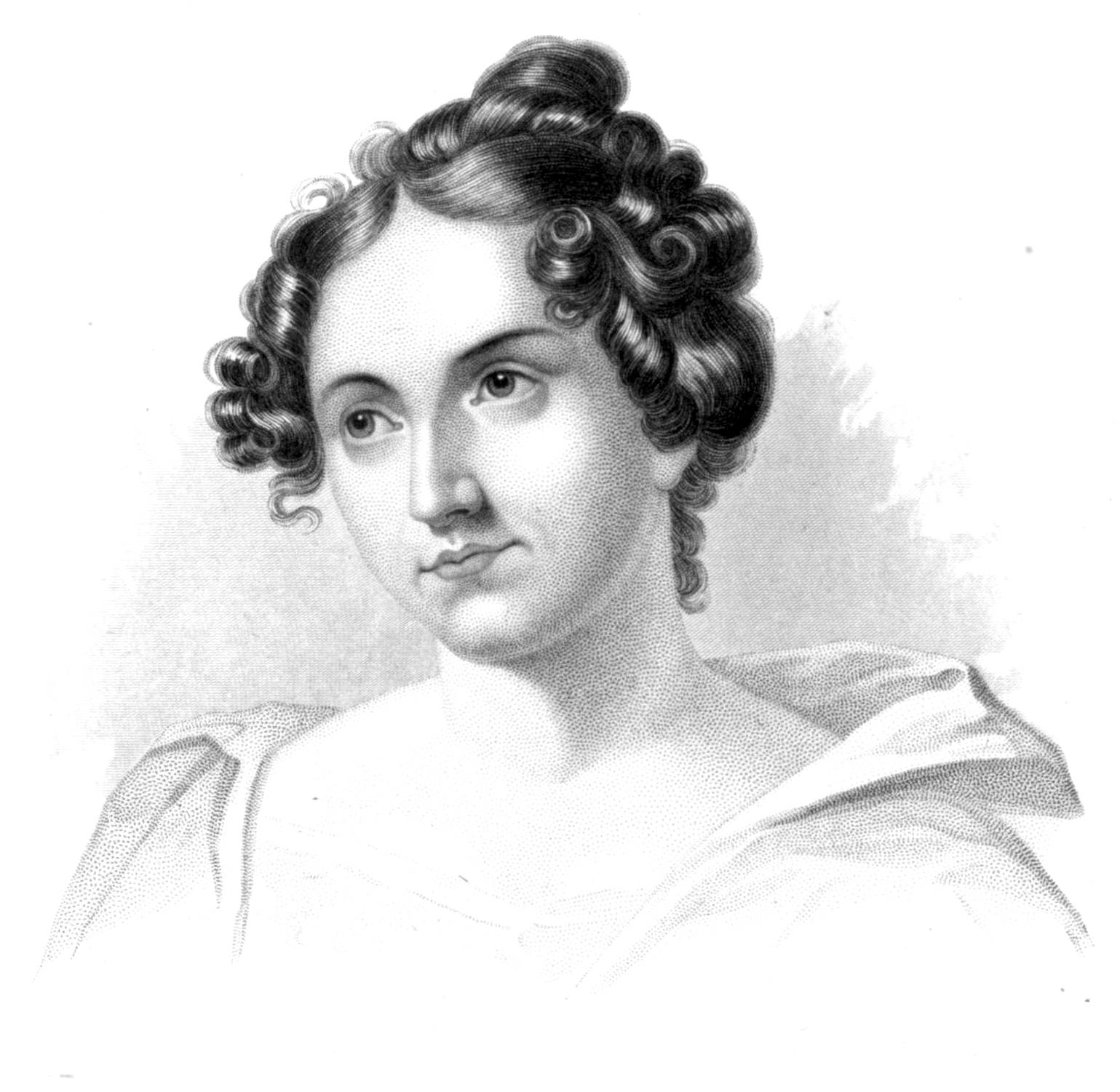
Catharine Sedgwick

- January 3 – Carl Gustav Carus, German physiologist (d. 1869)
- January 4 – Benjamin Lundy, American abolitionist (d. 1839)
- January 12 – Ettore Perrone di San Martino, prime minister of Sardinia (d. 1849)
- January 21 – William Machin Stairs, Canadian businessman and statesman (d. 1865)
- February 15 – Martin Chester Deming, American businessman and politician (d. 1851)
- February 22 – René Edward De Russy, Brigadier General of the United States Army, Superintendent of the United States Military Academy and military engineer (d. 1865)
- March 16 – Georg Ohm, German physicist (d. 1854)
- April 15 – Diego Noboa, 4th president of Ecuador (d. 1870)
- April 22
  - Manuel Gómez Pedraza, 6th president of Mexico (d. 1851)
  - Richard Roberts, Welsh-born mechanical engineer and inventor (d. 1864)
- May 1 – George Fife Angas, English coachbuilder, businessman and politician; founder of South Australia (d. 1879)
- May 24 – Cathinka Buchwieser, German operatic soprano and actress (d. 1828)
- June 8 – Queen Sunwon, Korean regent (d. 1857)
- June 18 – William Rowan, British field marshal (d. 1879)
- June 30 – Horace Vernet, French painter (d. 1863)
- July 19 – John Martin, English painter (d. 1854)
- July 21 – Vasil Aprilov, Bulgarian educator, merchant and writer (d. 1847)
- August 6 – Friedrich List, German journalist (d. 1846)
- August 21 – Augustin-Louis Cauchy, French mathematician (d. 1857)
- August 28 – Stéphanie de Beauharnais, Grand Duchess of Baden (d. 1860)
- September 3 – Hannah Flagg Gould, American poet (d. 1865)
- September 4 – Charles Gaudichaud-Beaupré, French botanist (d. 1854)
- September 15 – James Fenimore Cooper, American writer (d. 1851)
- September 28 – Richard Bright, English physician, "Father of Nephrology" (d. 1858)
- October 8 – William Swainson, English naturalist, artist (d. 1855)
- October 23 – Jean Chrétien Baud, Governor-General of the Dutch East Indies (d. 1859)
- November 5 – William Bland, Australian politician (d. 1868)
- December 14 – Maria Szymanowska, Polish composer (d. 1831)
- December 15
  - Edward B. Dudley, North Carolina governor (d. 1855)
  - Carlos Soublette, two-time president of Venezuela (d. 1870)
- December 22 – Levi Woodbury, American politician, Associate Justice of the Supreme Court of the United States (d. 1851)
- December 25 – Elizabeth Jesser Reid, English social reformer, founder of Bedford College (d. 1866)
- December 28 – Catharine Sedgwick, American novelist (d. 1867)

== Deaths ==
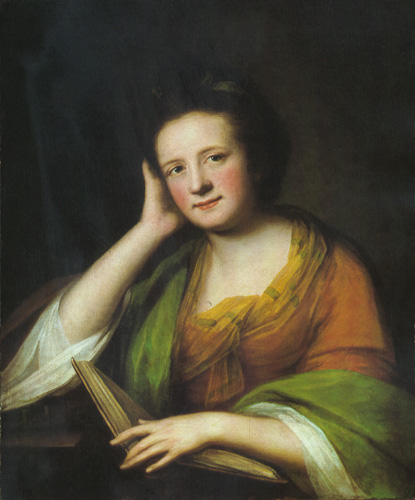
Frances Brooke

- January 1 – Fletcher Norton, 1st Baron Grantley, English politician (b. 1716)
- January 4
  - Johan Jacob Bruun, Danish artist (b. 1715)
  - Thomas Nelson Jr., American signer of the Declaration of Independence and Governor of Virginia (1781) (b. 1738)
- January 8 – Jack Broughton, English boxer (b. 1703)
- January 10 – James Mitchell Varnum, American brigadier general of the Revolutionary War, Continental Congressman for Rhode Island (b. 1748)
- January 13 – Joseph Spencer, American major general of the Revolutionary War, Continental Congressman for Connecticut (b. 1714)
- January 23 – Frances Brooke, English writer (b. 1724)
- January 25 – James Randolph Reid, American Continental Congressman for Connecticut (b. 1750)
- February 2 – Armand-Louis Couperin, French composer and keyboard player (b. 1727)
- February 12 – Ethan Allen, American major general of the Revolutionary War, Vermont statesman (b. 1738)
- February 19 – Nicholas Van Dyke, American lawyer and President of Delaware (b. 1738)
- March 23 – Thomas Osborne, 4th Duke of Leeds, British politician (b. 1713)
- April 5 – William Vane, 2nd Viscount Vane of Ireland (b. 1714)

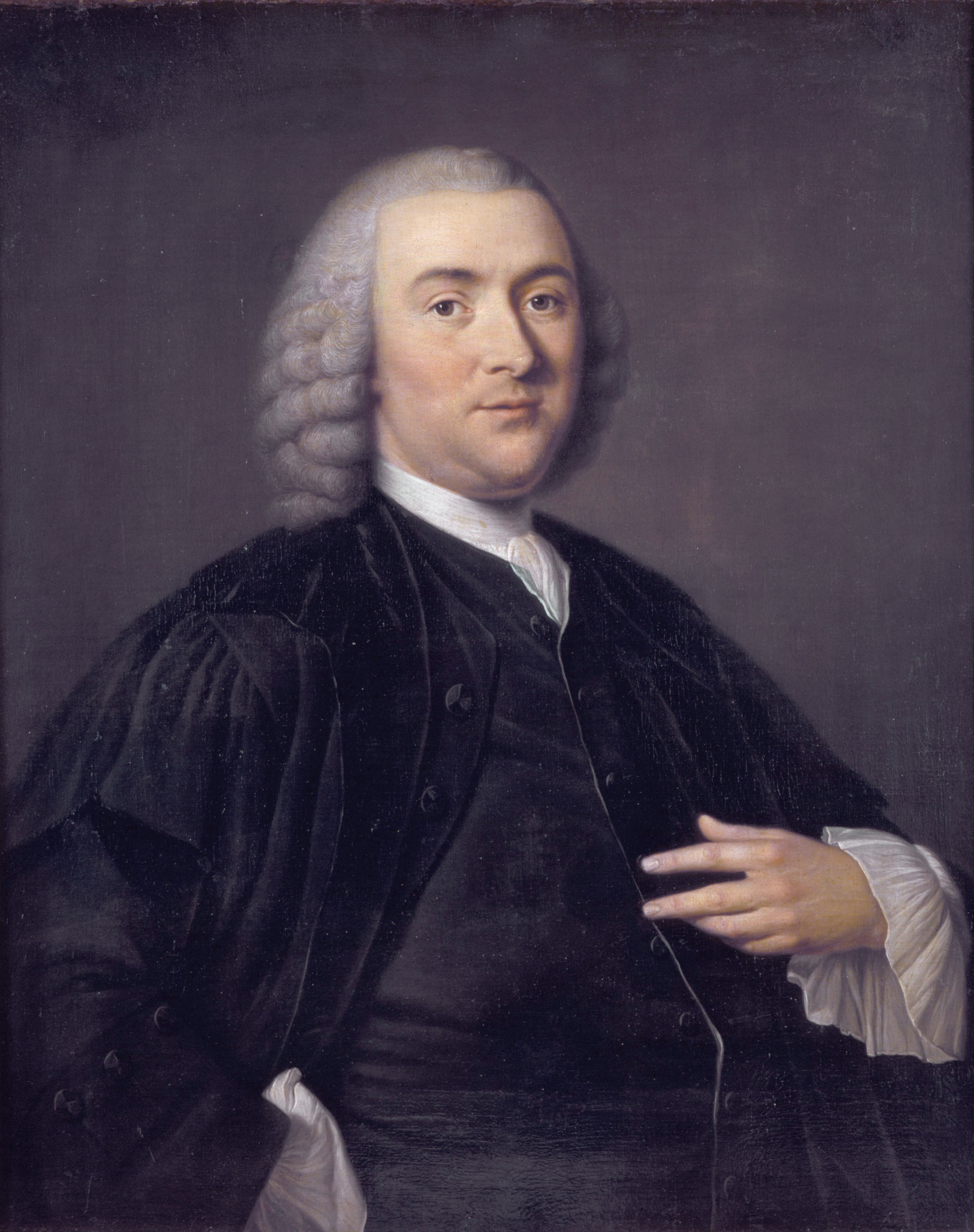
Petrus Camper

- April 7
  - Abdul Hamid I, Ottoman Sultan (b. 1725)
  - Petrus Camper, Dutch anatomist (b. 1722)
- April 13 – Joseph Spencer, American colonel of the Revolutionary War, Continental Congressman for New Hampshire (b. 1739)
- April 26 – Count Petr Ivanovich Panin, Russian soldier (b. 1721)
- May 5 – Giuseppe Marc'Antonio Baretti, Italian literary critic (b. 1719)
- May 9
  - Jean-Baptiste Vaquette de Gribeauval, French artillery specialist (b. 1715)
  - Anders Johan von Höpken, Swedish politician (b. 1712)
- May 15 – Jean-Baptiste Marie Pierre, French painter (b. 1714)
- May 25 – Anders Dahl, Swedish botanist (b. 1751)
- June 4 – Louis Joseph, Dauphin of France, son of Louis XVI (tuberculosis) (b. 1781)
- June 6 – Charles Thomas, Prince of Löwenstein-Wertheim-Rochefort, German nobleman, head of the House of Löwenstein-Wertheim-Rochefort (b. 1714)
- June 15 – Marcus Fredrik Bang, Norwegian bishop (b. 1711)
- July 13 – Victor de Riqueti, marquis de Mirabeau, French economist (b. 1715)
- July 14 – Jacques de Flesselles, French provost (assassinated) (b. 1721)
- July 15 – Jacques Duphly, French composer and harpsichordist (b. 1715)
- July 16 – Domenico Caracciolo, Italian politician (b. 1715)
- July 22 – Joseph Foullon de Doué, French politician (executed) (b. 1715)
- July 30 – Giovanna Bonanno, Italian poisoner, alleged witch (b. c. 1713)
- August 22 – Johann Heinrich Tischbein, German artist (b. 1722)
- September 4 – Paul Spooner, American lieutenant governor of Vermont (1782–1787) (b. 1746)

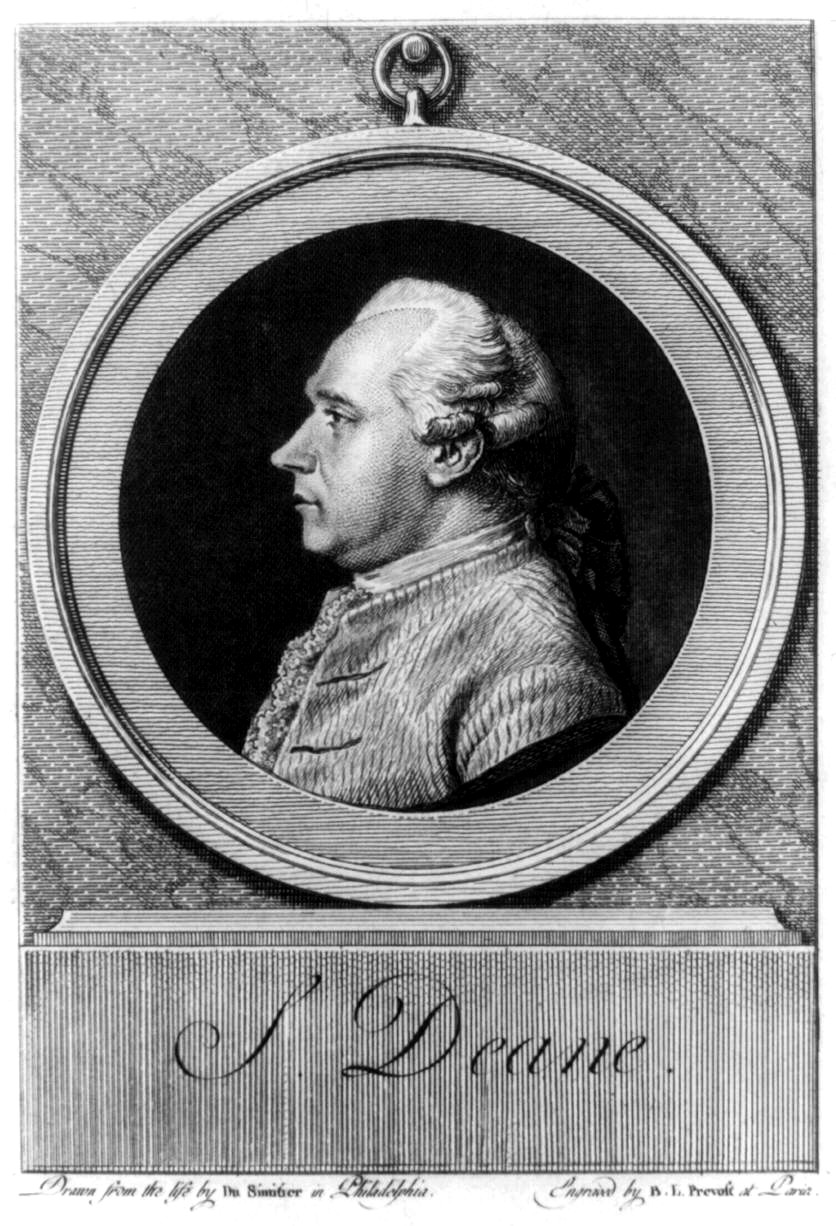
Silas Deane

- September 23
  - John Rogers, American Continental Congressman for Maryland (b. 1723)
  - Silas Deane, American Continental Congressman for Connecticut (b. 1737)
- October 9 – James Hamilton, 8th Earl of Abercorn (b. 1712)
- October 27 – John Cook, American farmer, President of Delaware (b. 1730)
- October 28 (bur.) – Mary Evans, Welsh sect leader (b. 1735)
- November 10 – Richard Caswell, American major general of the Revolutionary War, Continental Congressman and Governor of North Carolina (1776–80, 1785–87) (b. 1729)
- November 17 – Samuel Holden Parsons, American major general of the Revolutionary War, member of the Connecticut House of Representatives (b. 1737)
- November 26 – John Elwes, English miser and politician (b. 1714)
- December 3 – Claude Joseph Vernet, French painter (b. 1714)
- December 10 – William Pierce, American member of the Georgia House of Representatives, Continental Congressman for Georgia (c. 1753)
- December 12 – John Ponsonby, Irish politician (b. 1713)
- December 23 – Charles-Michel de l'Épée, French philanthropist, developer of signed French (b. 1712)
