= Robert Benson (actor) =

English stage actor

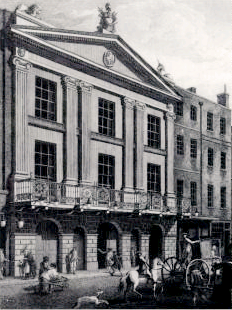
Drury Lane Theatre.

Robert Benson (1765–1796) was an English stage actor of the eighteenth century. The son of two actors, he made his first London appearance at the Theatre Royal, Haymarket in 1778 as a child actor playing the Duke of York in Richard III and acted occasionally at the Theatre Royal, Drury Lane over the following years. After an absence of some time, he returned to Drury Lane in November 1786 having now graduated to adult roles. He became a reliable member of the company known for his character roles as comic eccentrics and smooth young gentleman. For the summer of 1791, he took over the management of Richmond Theatre with James Thompson and William Macready. He also acted at Haymarket during the summers and authored an operatic farce Britain's Glory which premiered there in 1795. In 1783 he married the actress Susanna Satchell (1758–1814), the sister of Elizabeth Satchell.

In 1796, reportedly delirious from fever he fell or jumped from the window of his lodgings in Bridges Street and died aged thirty one. He was buried in St Paul's Church in Covent Garden, which is closely associated with actors.

== Selected roles ==
- Pedro in The Regent by Bertie Greatheed (1788)
- Earl of Shrewsbury in Mary, Queen of Scots by John St John (1789)
- Lopez in Marcella by William Hayley (1789)
- Joe in The Box-Lobby Challenge by Richard Cumberland (1794)
- Orgar in Edwy and Elgiva by Fanny Burney (1795)
- Hengist in Vortigern and Rowena by William Henry Ireland (1796)

== Bibliography ==
- Burnim, Kalman A. & Highfill, Philip H. John Bell, Patron of British Theatrical Portraiture: A Catalog of the Theatrical Portraits in His Editions of Bell's Shakespeare and Bell's British Theatre. SIU Press, 1998.
- Highfill, Philip H, Burnim, Kalman A. & Langhans, Edward A. A Biographical Dictionary of Actors, Actresses, Musicians, Dancers, Managers and Other Stage Personnel in London, 1660–1800, Volumes 1–2. SIU Press, 1973.
