= Robert Merry =

English poet and dilettante (1755–1798)

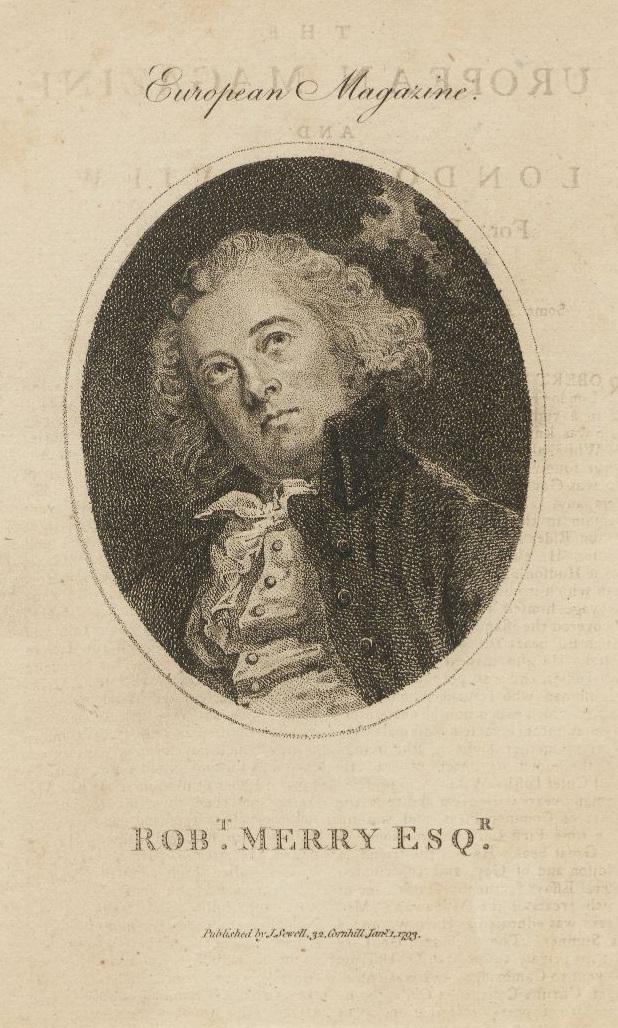
- Robert Merry by Joshua Reynolds, from an unidentified book or magazine
- Born: 1755; London, England
- Died: 1798 (aged 42–43)
- Occupation: Poet
- Notable work: "Adieu and Recall to Love", "The Air Balloon"
- Spouse: Ann Brunton

Robert Merry (1755–1798) was an English poet and dilettante. He was born in London. Both his father and grandfather were involved in the governance of the Hudson's Bay Company. His mother was the eldest daughter of Sir John Willes, Lord Chief Justice.

== Education and early career ==
Merry's education was entrusted to his father's sister, who sent him to Harrow, where his tutor was Dr.Parr, and then to Christ's College, Cambridge. He lived irregularly (according to Monthly Magazine), did not graduate, and on his return to London was entered of Lincoln's Inn, in accordance with his father's wishes. On the latter's death he immediately purchased a commission in the Royal Horse Guards. After squandering a large part of his fortune on high living and heavy gambling, he sold his commission, went abroad, and apparently spent some three or four years travelling in France, the Low Countries, Germany, Switzerland, and Italy. He finally joined the English colony settled in Florence.

== Sojourn in Italy ==
He was there in 1784, studying Italian and lounging with the artistic crowd in the Tribuna, when he embarked upon a literary career by contributing to the Arno Miscellany and, in 1785, to the Florence Miscellany. These were collections of verse by Mrs. Piozzi, Greatheed, Parsons, and Merry, who rapidly became a recognised figure in Florentine society, and a member of the Accademia della Crusca. But his social success, his open liaison with the Countess Cowper, and the rivalry of the Grand-duke Leopold, made him an easy target for slander. He stood his ground for a time, then after lampooning his fellow-rhymers, abruptly quit Florence in the spring of 1787.

== Return to England ==
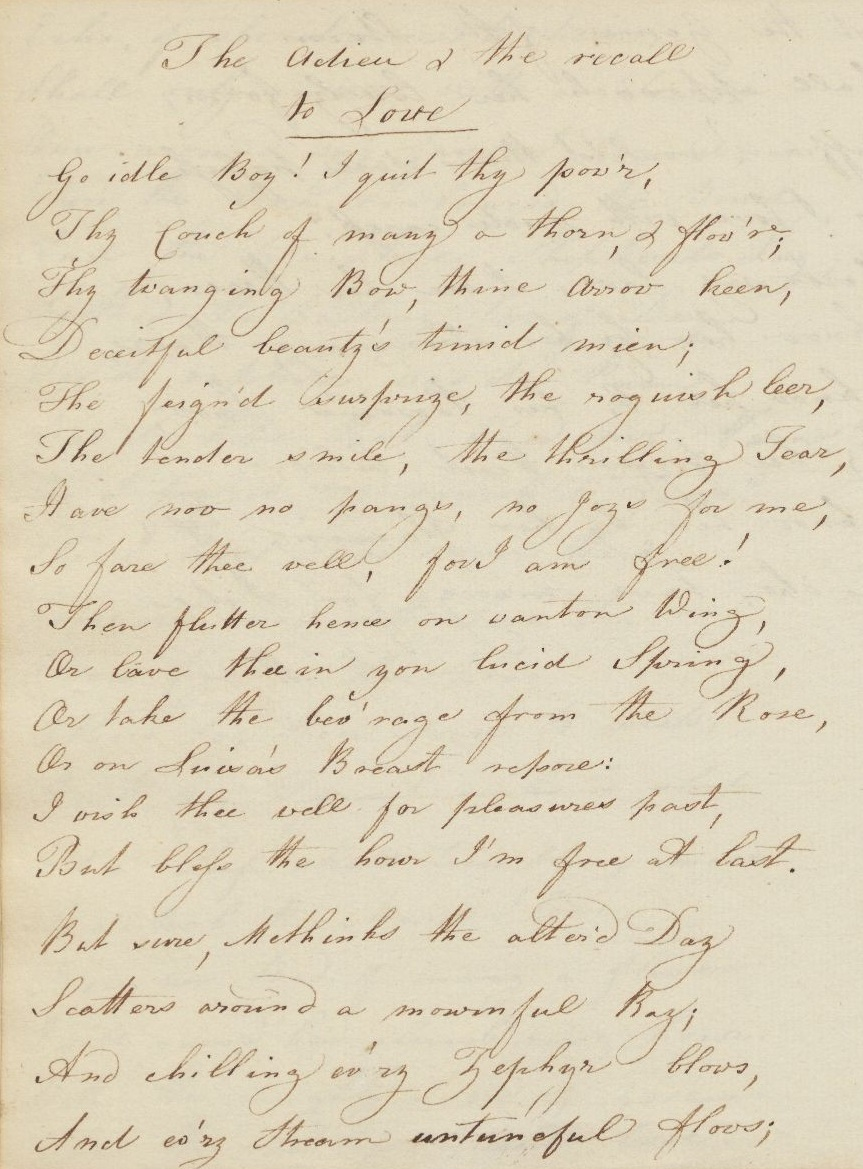
Manuscript for "Adieu and Recall to Love"

The "Miscellanies" had kindled curiosity in London, and literary coteries welcomed the poet. On 29 June his Adieu and Recall to Love, signed "Della Crusca", appeared in the World, then chiefly conducted by Edward Topham, a fellow-commoner of Merry's at Cambridge, and fellow-officer in the Royal Horse Guards. "I read the beautiful lines", Mrs. Hannah Cowley declared, "and without rising from the table at which I was sitting answered them". Her reply, The Pen, signed "Anna Matilda", was published in the World of 12 July, and the correspondence thus started rapidly attracted a crowd of imitators, whose performances, welcomed by the World and afterwards by the Oracle, first amused and then revolted public taste. Merry's pseudonym gave its name to the Della Cruscan school, which faithfully exaggerated the worst features of his style: affectation, misuse of epithet, metaphor, and alliteration, efforts at sublimity, obscurity and tasteless ornament. As for "Anna Matilda" and "Della Crusca", they wrote, according to Mrs. Cowley's statement, without any knowledge of each other's identity until 1789. Then the ardent enthusiasts upon paper met, but the lady was forty-six, the lover thirty-four, and the only fruit of the meeting was one more poem, The Interview, by Merry, and some regrets in cloudy verse by Cowley. When he published the Laurel of Liberty next year, it was under his own name.

== Other literary efforts and the Revolution ==
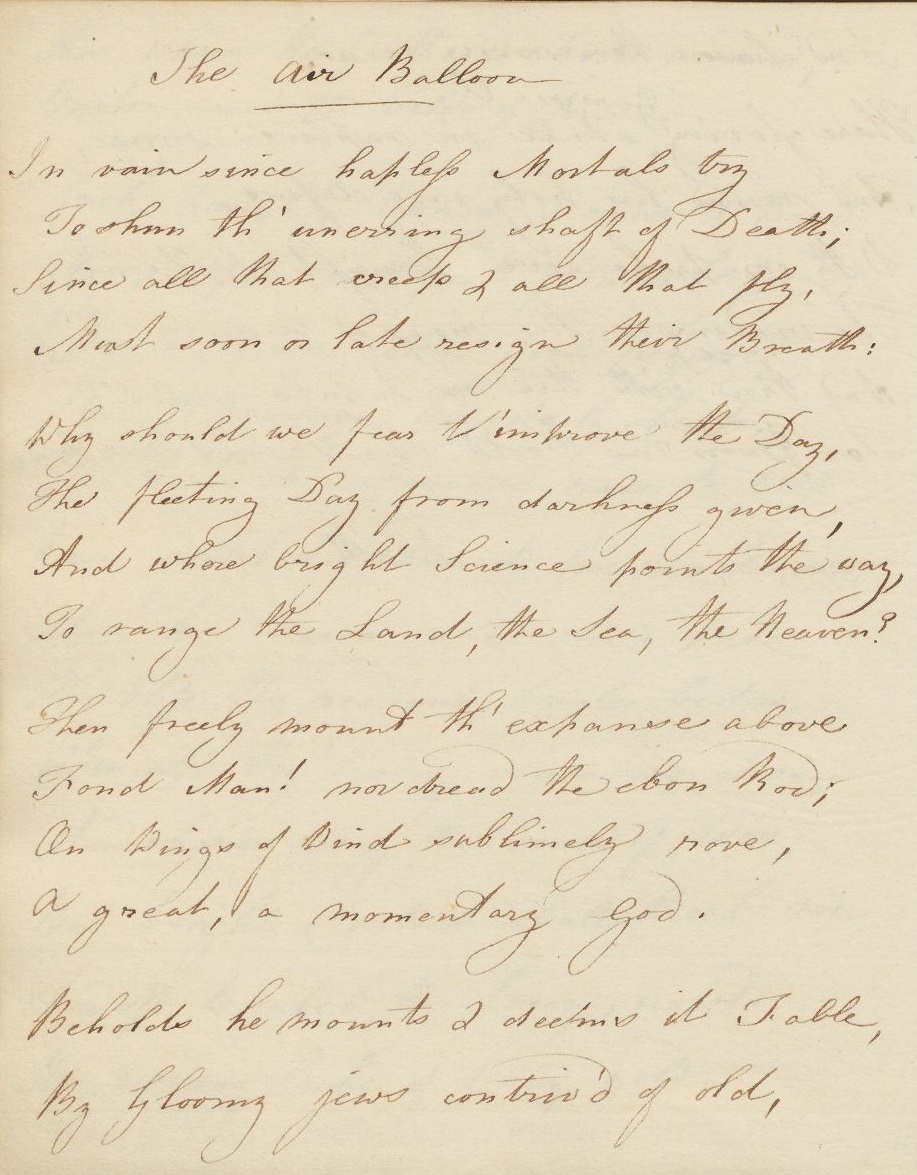
Undated manuscript of poem "The Air Balloon"

Merry had meanwhile been engaged in other literary ventures. Paulina, a tale in verse, had appeared towards the close of 1787. Diversity, an elaborate ode, in the following year and, in 1789, the Ambitious Vengeance, a drama, which in plot, character, and situation is a travesty of Macbeth. It was never acted. In the beginning of the same year he wrote the ode for the recovery of the king recited by Mrs. Siddons on 21 April. But the events of the 14th July in Paris gave a new direction to his energies, and coloured the rest of his life. Merry did not judge the French Revolution, but judged everything by it; his friends, himself, literature, art, all civil and social relations. He went immediately to Paris, visited the Assembly, where he saw "some disorder, but all from zeal", and on his return published the Laurel of Liberty. The poem was ridiculed by Walpole, who fastens with glee upon his "gossamery tears" and "silky oceans". In 1790, Merry presented himself as a candidate for the laureateship, but his principles, already the talk of the town, made his candidature hopeless; and though the World moved mountains on his behalf, the court was all for Pye. In the summer of 1791 he was again in Paris, presented to the Assembly a treatise on the "Nature of a Free Government", and resumed an acquaintance with the artist David. On 14 July his ode on the Fall of the Bastille was declaimed at a meeting in the Strand of "1,500 English gentlemen", sympathisers with the French Revolution. Three months previously his Lorenzo, a tragedy, had a brief success at Covent Garden, and in August 1791 he married the well-known actress Ann Brunton.

== Marriage and debt ==
After her marriage, during the winter of 1791–2, she continued to act under her new name; but the outcry of his family (his mother was still alive) forced Merry to withdraw her from the London stage in the spring. The complete failure of his production, The Magician no Conjuror, produced at Covent Garden in February 1792, may have made the decision easier. They went together to France, and Merry was in Paris on 10 Aug. and on 2 Sept., but refused an invitation to be present at the trial of King Louis. Walpole tells a story of Merry's being mistaken by the mob for Abbé Maury, and of his being pursued with the cry "A la lanterne". In 1793 he and his wife returned to London, and lived in an unsettled way for the next three years, Merry haunting the clubs, declaiming on freedom and the French Revolution, writing epigrams against Pitt and his supporters in the Argus and Telegraph, and, notwithstanding his friend Topham's good-nature, sinking daily deeper into debt. Fénelon, an adaptation of Marie-Joseph Chénier's play, was published in 1795, and the Pains of Memory, a versified reproduction of talks with Rogers, in the following year. He also wrote the epilogue spoken by Mrs. Jordan at the notable performance of the pseudo-Shakespearean Vortigern on 2 April 1796.

== Life and death in the United States ==
Regard for his family still kept his wife reluctantly from the stage; but when Wignell, of the New Theatre, Philadelphia, offered her an engagement in 1796, Merry, to whom life in London was becoming embarrassing, gave his consent, and in October they landed at New York. On 5 Dec. Mrs. Merry appeared in Philadelphia as Juliet, "perhaps the best Juliet", Dunlap thought, "that was ever seen or heard". She acted in New York next year, and afterwards in the chief cities of the union, everywhere leaving her American rivals behind. Merry himself, in 1797, brought out his drama, The Abbey of St. Augustine, at Philadelphia, but for the most part contented himself with the unofficial laureateship which the younger writers granted to his London reputation. In 1798 he was living in Baltimore and still clinging to his faith in the French Revolution. On 14 Dec., in the morning, while walking in his garden, he fell in an apoplectic fit, and three hours later was dead.

Only The Laurel of Liberty has ever been reissued (British Library, 2011, ISBN 1-2411-7937-9). The Magician no Conjuror (with music by Joseph Mazzinghi) was performed at the Theatre Royal, Covent Garden in 1972.
