= Della Cruscans =

European late-18th-century poets

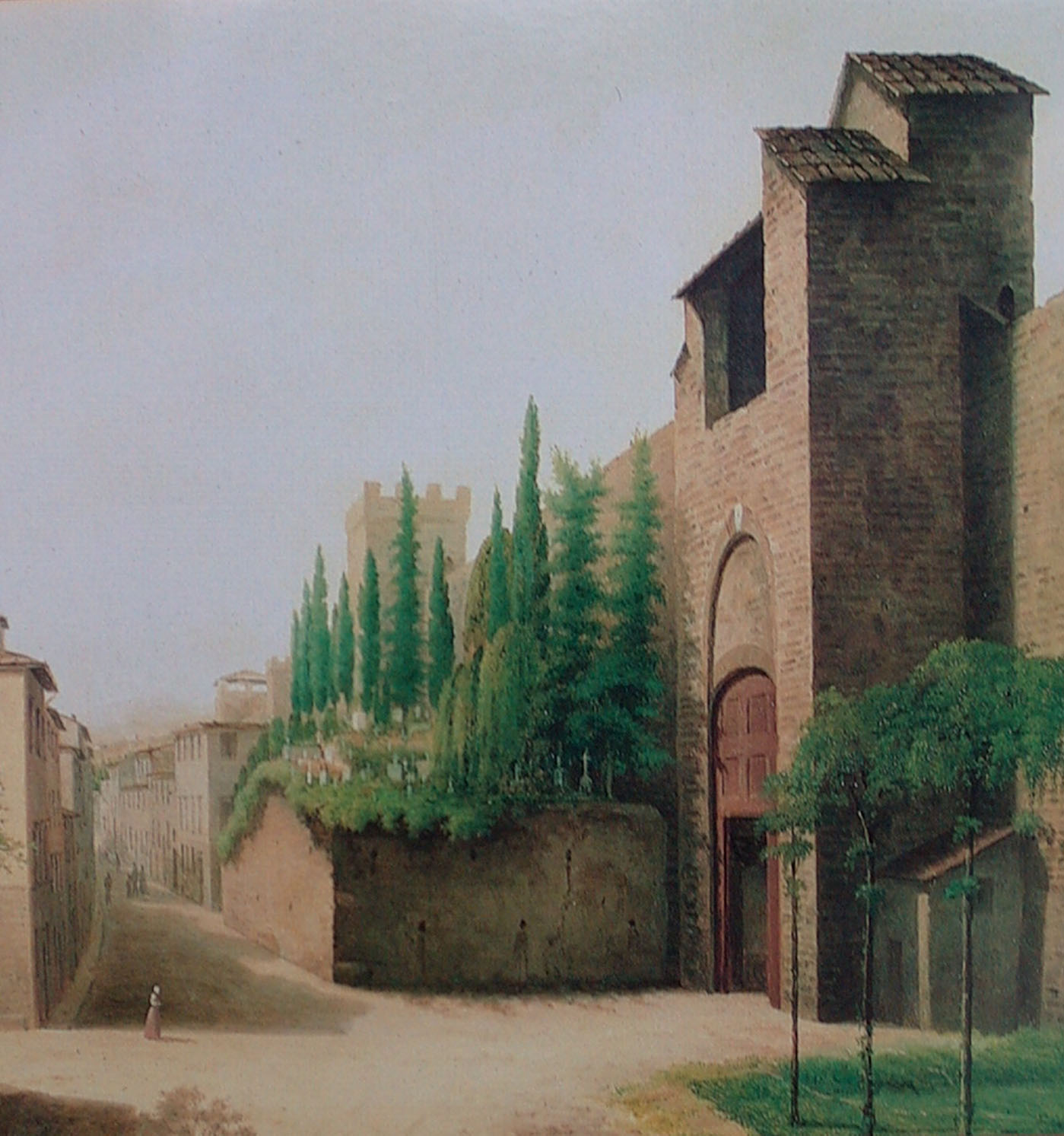
Porta a' Pinti English Cemetery, Florence, before 1827

The Della Cruscans were a circle of European late-18th-century sentimental poets founded by Robert Merry (1755–98).

== History and influence ==
Robert Merry travelled to Florence where he edited two volumes, The Arno Miscellany (1784) and The Florence Miscellany (1785), the latter of which could be said to have started the Della Cruscan phenomena. It was a collaboration between English and Italian poets and contained poems in English, Italian, and French. The name is taken from the Florentine Accademia della Crusca, an organization founded in 1583 to "purify" the Italian language. Bertie Greatheed's "The Dream" opens the collection with an indictment of the current deplorable state of poetry and calls for a return to a Miltonic style. The call to the past was made even more clear by the inclusion of translations of poems by Dante and Petrarch. Hester Thrale Piozzi's preface is more modest: "we wrote [these poems] to divert ourselves, and to say kind things of each other; we collected them that our reciprocal expressions of kindness might not be lost, and we printed them because we had no reason to be ashamed of our mutual partiality." William Parsons, a travelling Briton, was also of the circle. Merry returned to the UK in 1787 and published "Adieu and Recall to Love" in The World under the name of "Della Crusca". He was answered by Hannah Cowley's "The Pen," published two weeks later under the name of "Anna Matilda," their literary flirtation played out in the pages of the journal, and the Della Cruscan phenomenon spread to England. The highly successful The Poetry of the World (1788), a collection of the poetic dialogue between "Anna Matilda" and "Della Crusca," followed shortly and went through several editions. Other members of the English Della Cruscan circle were "Laura Maria" (Mary Robinson), "Benedict" (Edward Jerningham), "Reuben" (Greatheed), Frederick Pilon, and others.

Subject to criticism in their own time, notably William Gifford's savage verse satires The Baviad (1791) and The Maeviad (1795), subsequent literary historians seem incapable of writing about the group without using terms like "excess," "nonsense," "affected," or "copious." The previous generation was even more unforgiving: "[T]his epidemic" of Della Cruscanism "spread for a term from fool to fool." The school was indeed short-lived, and survived until recently as an emblem of exaggerated sensibility. Some contemporary critics, however, have reevaluated these poets and present a more forgiving view. According to David Hill Radcliffe, "While the Della Cruscan school enjoyed but brief reign, it had the effect of popularizing the highly literary romantic modes previously associated largely with university poets." Further, "While the Della Cruscans did not invent the newspaper conversation in verse, they exerted a potent influence over contributors to British and American periodicals that extended for decades." Silvia Bordoni writes, of charges that the poetry was artificial and overly-elaborate, "[t]he mannerism of the Della Cruscan poetry, especially in its initial phase, however, is linked to seventeenth- and early eighteenth-century Italian poetry, which was promoted by the Accademia della Crusca as exemplary of the purity and variety of the Italian language, against the spreading of foreign terminologies and dialects." Finally, the school may not have been as inconsequential as was formerly thought: "while the Della Cruscan influence on British Romanticism is still largely unacknowledged, their poetry contributed to the forging of the Mediterranean poetics, the improvisatory style, the satirical-erotic vein and the politically liberal intent that were to prevail in British poetry during the first decades of the nineteenth century."

== Texts ==
- The Arno Miscellany (privately printed, 1784). Contributors: Robert Merry, Bertie Greatheed, Hester Thrale Piozzi
- The Florence Miscellany (Florence, G. Cam, 1785). Contributors: William Parsons (editor), Robert Merry, Hester Thrale Piozzi, Bertie Greatheed, Ippolito Pindemonte, Lorenzo Pignotti, Angelo d'Elci, Giuseppe Parini, Marco Lastri, Gabriel Mario Piozzi.
- The Poetry of the World (John Bell, ed., 1788). The fourth edition was retitled The British Album (2 Vols., 1790) Contributors: Robert Merry, Hannah Cowley

== Etexts ==
- "Anna Matilda"[Hannah Cowley], "To Della Crusca"; "To Della Crusca. The Pen"; "Invocation to Horror"; "To Indifference"
- "Della Crusca" [Robert Merry], seventeen poems
- Bertie Greatheed, "A Dream"; "Ode to Apathy"; "Ode to Duel"
- "Laura Maria" [Mary Robinson], "Ainsi va le Monde, A Poem inscribed to Robert Merry"; "Ode to Della Crusca"; twenty-two poems
- William Parsons, seven poems

== Resources ==
- Bordoni, Silvia. "Lord Byron and the Della Cruscans: The Della Cruscans' Anglo-Italian Poetics." The Centre for Study of Byron and Romanticism, 2006 [accessed April 13, 2007].
- Drabble, Margaret, ed. "Della Cruscans"; "Gifford, William.The Oxford Companion to English Literature. OUP, 1985. 265-266; 390-391.
- Hargreaves-Mawdsley, W.N. The English Della Cruscans and Their Time, 1783-1828. International Archives of the History of Ideas #22. The Hague: Martinus Nijhoff, 1967.
- Labbe, Jacqueline M. "Anthologised Romance of Della Crusca and Anna Matilda." Romanticism On the Net 18 (May 2000) [accessed April 13, 2007].
- Longaker, John Mark. The Della Cruscans and William Gifford: The History of a Minor Movement in an Age of Literary Transition. University of Pennsylvania, 1924.
- Ousby, Ian. "Della Cruscans." The Cambridge Guide to Literature in English. Cambridge UP, 2000. 249 [accessed April 12, 2007].
- Radcliffe, David Hill, compiler. English Poetry 1579-1830: Spenser and the Tradition
