= Sarah Wentworth Apthorp Morton =

American poet (1759–1846)

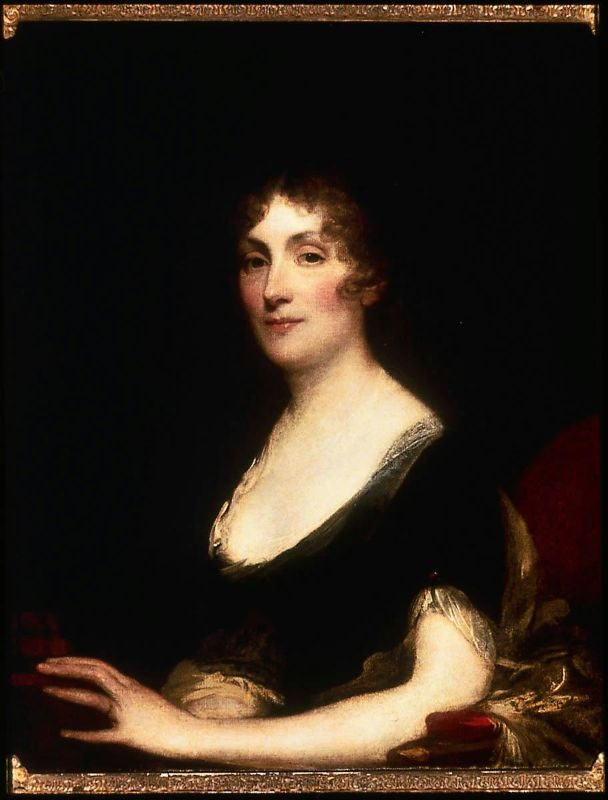
- Portrait of Sarah Wentworth Apthorp Morton, c. 1802, by Gilbert Stuart (Museum of Fine Arts, Boston)
- Born: Sarah Wentworth Apthorp; August 1759; Boston, Massachusetts, British America
- Died: May 15, 1846 (aged 86); Braintree, Massachusetts, U.S.
- Resting place: King's Chapel Burying Ground
- Occupation: Poet
- Spouse: Perez Morton (m. 1781; died 1837)
- Children: 5
- Relatives: Charles Apthorp (grandfather)

Sarah Wentworth Apthorp Morton (August 1759 – May 14, 1846) was an American poet.

== Early life ==
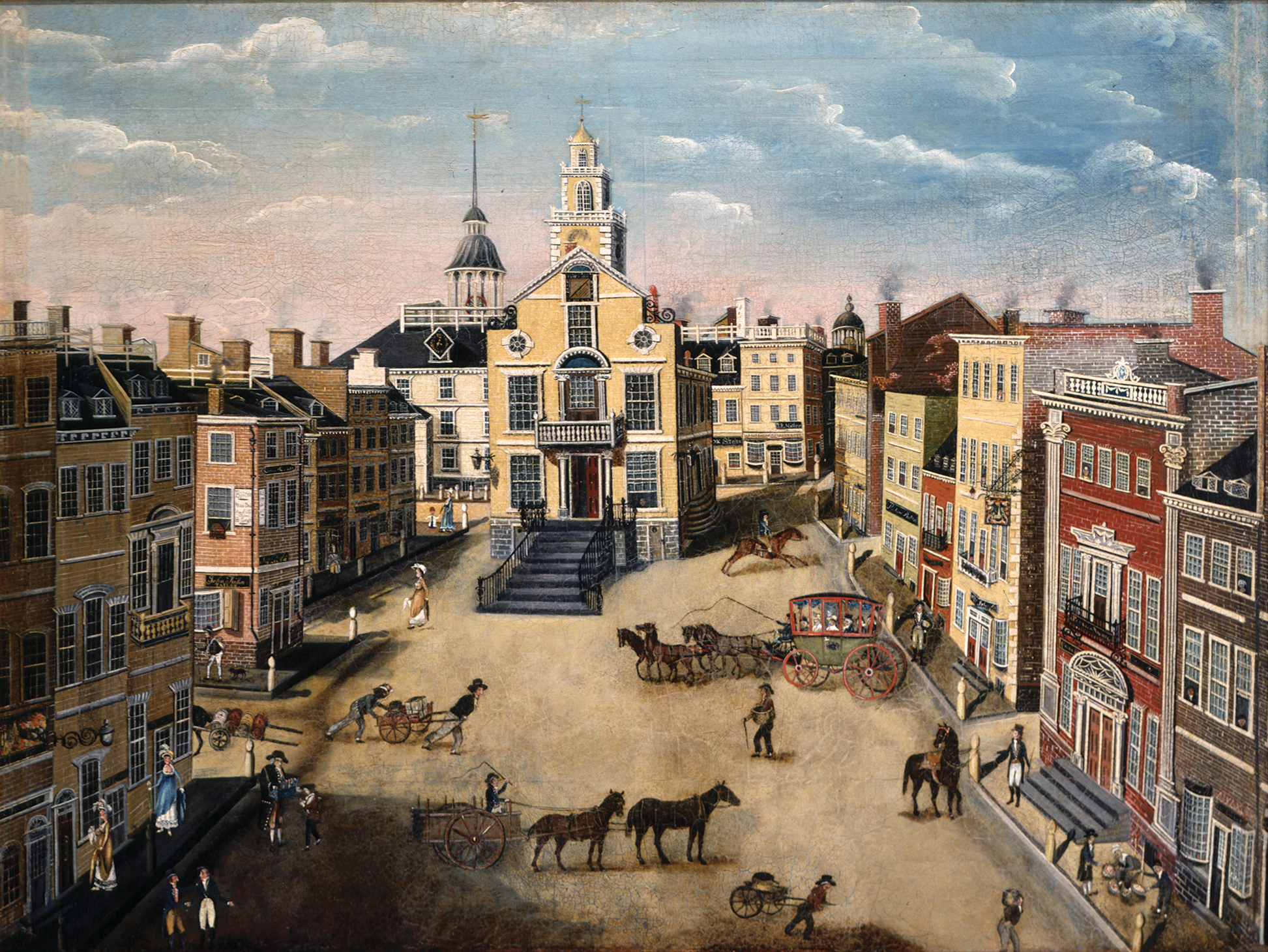
The Apthorp mansion, where Sarah grew up, is the second on the right.

Sarah was born in Boston, Massachusetts, in August 1759. She was the third of ten children born to James Apthorp (1731–1799), a merchant and slave-trader, and Sarah Wentworth (1735–1820), whose family owned Wentworth Manor in Yorkshire.

Her father was one of eighteen children born to her paternal grandparents, Charles Apthorp (1698–1758), a British-born merchant in 18th-century Boston, and Grizzelle (née Eastwicke) Apthorp (1709–1796). Her maternal grandfather was Samuel Wentworth (1708–1766), also a Boston merchant, and his father was John Wentworth (1671–1730), the colonial lieutenant governor of New Hampshire who lived in Portsmouth, New Hampshire.

== Writing ==
In 1792, she wrote an anti-slavery poem entitled The African Chief, which was, in fact, an elegy on a slain African at St. Domingo in 1791.

In 1796, Sarah and her husband, Perez, moved to Dorchester. From an early age, Sarah had written poetry, but until 1788 her works only circulated among her friends. She began publishing under the pen name Philenia, and her first book was printed in 1790. Her work was widely acclaimed, with Robert Treat Paine, Jr., in the Massachusetts Magazine dubbing her the "American Sappho".

She was mistakenly assumed to be the author of The Power of Sympathy (1789), which is widely considered the first American novel, before it was proven to have been written by her neighbor, William Hill Brown.

== Personal life ==
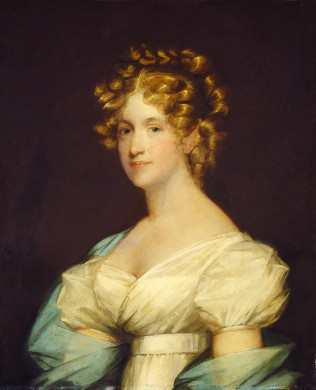
Portrait of Sarah's daughter, Charlotte Morton Dexter, by Gilbert Stuart (1808)

In 1781, she married Boston lawyer Perez Morton (1751–1837) at Trinity Church, Boston. Morton served as the speaker of the Massachusetts House of Representatives, from 1806 to 1808 and again from 1810 to 1811, and was the Massachusetts attorney general from 1810 to 1832. The couple lived on a family mansion on State Street. From around 1796 to around 1803, the Mortons owned a house on Dudley Street in Dorchester; the house may have been designed by Charles Bulfinch. Together, they were the parents of five children who lived to maturity, including:

- Sarah Apthorp Morton (1782–1844), who married Richard Cunningham, son of John Cunningham, in Nova Scotia.
- Anna Louisa Morton (1783–1843).
- Frances Wentworth Morton (1785–1831).
- Charles Ward Apthorp Morton (1786–1809),
- Charlotte Morton (1787–1819), who married Andrew Dexter, Jr. (1779–1837), a lawyer, financier, and speculator.

Sarah died on May 14, 1846, in Braintree, Massachusetts. She was buried at King's Chapel Burying Ground in Boston.

=== Husband's affair and sister's suicide ===
In the mid-1780s, Sarah's younger sister Frances Apthorp (1766–1788), or Fanny as she was known, came to live with her and her family. Reportedly, Fanny was seduced by, or fell in love with, Sarah's husband Perez. Fanny gave birth to his child in 1787 or 1788, after which their father threatened to confront Perez. Hoping to avoid a scandal and public disgrace, Fanny persuaded her father to desist. Once the affair became public anyway, Fanny committed suicide by taking an overdose of laudanum. Fanny left a suicide note proclaiming her "guilty innocence" that was published in newspapers shortly after her death.

In January 1789 Sarah's brother Charles Apthorp challenged Perez Morton to a duel. The two men met to duel, but the sheriff prevented the illegal encounter. The Mortons' marriage deteriorated, but the couple later reconciled. In spite of this reconciliation, fifteen years later Sarah had an affair with founding father Gouverneur Morris.

=== Legacy and descendants ===
Her Dorchester home is a site on the Boston Women's Heritage Trail.

Through her daughter Sarah, she is the great-great grandmother of Frederick Bradlee (1892–1970), an American football player who was a first-team All-American while attending Harvard University in 1914. Frederick was the father of American journalist Ben Bradlee (1921–2014) and the grandfather of journalist Ben Bradlee Jr. (b. 1948) and filmmaker Quinn Bradlee (b. 1982).

== Selected works ==
- Ouabi; Or the Virtues of Nature: An Indian Tale in Four Cantos 1790
- The African Chief, 1792.
- Beacon Hill. A Local Poem, 1797.
- The Virtues of Society. A Tale Founded on Fact, 1799.
- My Mind and Its Thoughts, in Sketches, Fragments, and Essays, 1823.
