= William Parsons (poet) =

English poet

William Parsons (died 1828) was an English poet, one of the Della Cruscans.

== Life ==
Parsons was one of the coterie who published verse in The World in 1784–5, and later called the "Della Cruscans". At that period he was living in Florence, and was on good terms with Hester Piozzi. He was piqued at his exclusion from The Baviad (1791), William Gifford's satire on the group, leading to an episode of name-calling. He lived mainly at Bath, Somerset.

In November 1787 Parsons was elected a Fellow of the Royal Society. Other details of his life are scanty.

== Works ==
In the Florence Miscellany of 1785, written with Piozzi, Robert Merry the original Della Cruscan, and Bertie Greatheed, Parsons had the largest share. A Poetical Tour in the years 1784, 1785, and 1786. By a member of the Arcadian Society at Rome, London, at the Logographic Press, 1787, is eked out by imitations, translations, and complimentary verses to Piozzi and Elizabeth Montagu. His subsequent publications were:

- An Ode to a Boy at Eton, London, 1796, intended to "counteract" the Elegy Written in a Country Churchyard.
- Fidelity; or, Love at First Sight: a Tale, with other Poems, London, 1798.
- Travelling Recreations, 2 vols. London, 1807.
