= The Regent (play) =

1788 play

- Original language: English
- Written by: Bertie Greatheed
- Genre: Tragedy
- Setting: Spain

Premiere
- Date: 29 March 1788
- Place: Theatre Royal, Drury Lane, London

The Regent is a 1788 tragedy by the British author Bertie Greatheed. It premiered at the Theatre Royal, Drury Lane in London on 29 March 1788. The original cast included Sarah Siddons as Dianora, John Philip Kemble as Manuel, Richard Wroughton as Gomez, James Aickin as Solerno, John Hayman Packer as Gerbin, Robert Benson as Pedro, William Bates as Diego, Richard Wilson as Servant, John Phillimore as Banditti and Sarah Ward as Paula. The Irish premiere took place at the Crow Street Theatre in Dublin on 5 July 1788. Although it was not a great success, it was nonetheless published and a German translation was issued in 1790.

== Bibliography ==
- Greene, John C. Theatre in Dublin, 1745-1820: A Calendar of Performances, Volume 6. Lexington Books, 2011.
- Lessenich, Rolf P. Neoclassical Satire and the Romantic School 1780-1830. V&R unipress GmbH, 2012.
- Nicoll, Allardyce. A History of English Drama 1660–1900: Volume III. Cambridge University Press, 2009.
- Hogan, C.B (ed.) The London Stage, 1660–1800: Volume V. Southern Illinois University Press, 1968.
