= Ouâbi =

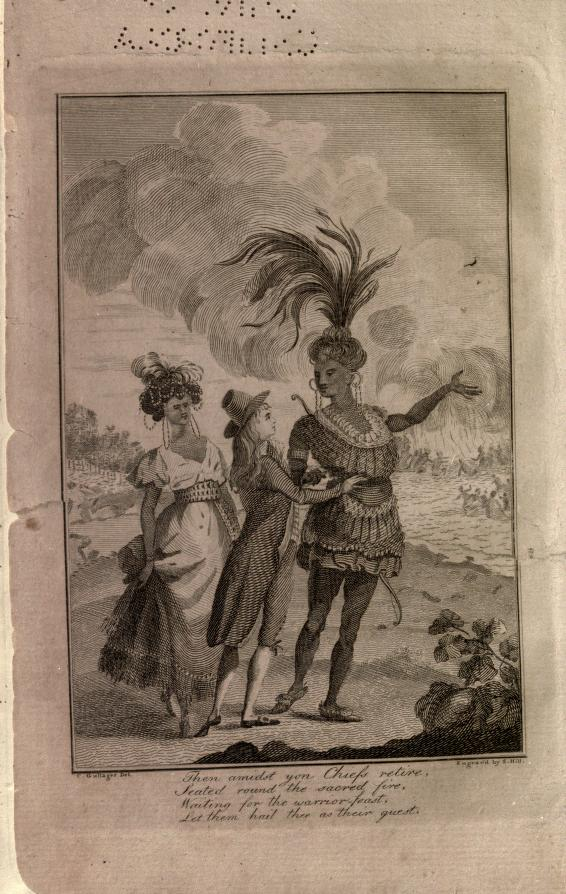
Frontispiece of the 1790 edition, illustrating the characters Azâkia, Celario, and Ouâbi.

Ouâbi; or, The Virtues of Nature: An Indian Tale in Four Cantos is a 1790 narrative poem by Sarah Wentworth Morton that tells the tale of a love triangle between two American Indians and one white man. The narrative is one of the first works to use Native American or "Indian" themes in American verse. Morton included many notes about contemporary understandings of Indian councils, war feasts, the Mississippi River, marriage ceremonies, and beliefs about revenge.

== Background ==
Ouâbi is written in the form of a narrative poem in four parts. Sarah Wentworth Morton had it published in 1790 under the pen name Philenia. The work is the first of its kind with an American Indian hero.

== Plot summary ==
The narrative poem tells the story of a woman, Azâkia, belonging to the Illinois Indian Tribe. Azâkia is first introduced to the reader while a man from the rival Huron Tribe is attempting to rape her. Azâkia is then rescued by a white man, Celario, which spurs a love triangle between Celario, Azâkia, and her husband, Ouâbi. This triangle is not only of love, but also of friendship, as Ouâbi and Celario actually generate a very good friendship.

Celario lusts after Azâkia, and she has feelings for him, but she knows she must stay loyal to her husband, Ouâbi. The Illinois sachem allows Celario to go to war with him, to prove himself worthy of his wife, Azâkia. Celario is injured in battle and sent back to the settlement with Azâkia. Ultimately, Ouâbi realizes that the love Celario has for Azâkia is unmatched by the love he has for her. Ouâbi relinquishes his "marriage" to Azâkia so she and Celario can be together as was truly meant to be.
