= Giovanna Bonanno =

Italian poisoner

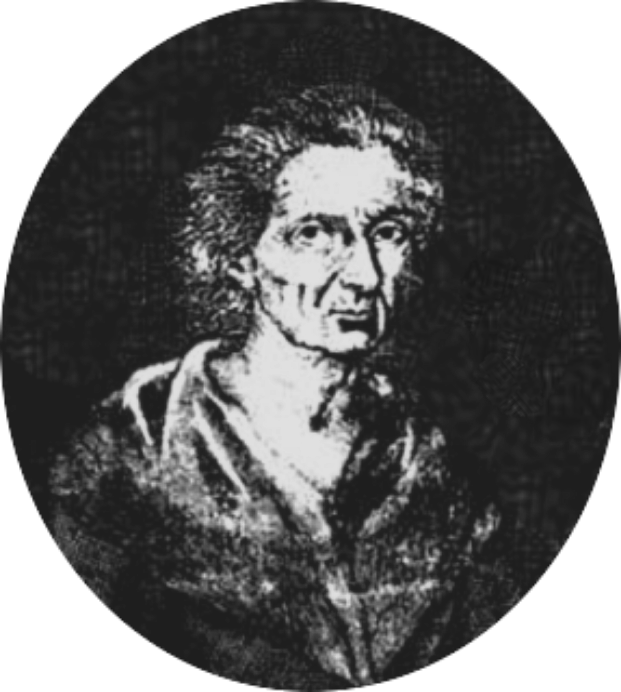
Engraving of Giovanna Bonanno, by Bartolomeo Pollini.

Giovanna Bonanno (c. 1713 – 30 July 1789) was an alleged Italian witch and professional poisoner known as la vecchia dell'aceto, "The Old Vinegar Lady."

== Life and career ==
Little is known of Bonanno's early life, though she is believed to have been the same woman as Anna Panto, mentioned in 1744 as the wife of one Vincenzo Bonanno. She was a beggar in Palermo, Sicily in the reign of Domenico Caracciolo, Viceroy of Sicily (term 1781–1786).

During her trial, Bonanno confessed to being a poisoner and that she sold poison to women who wanted to murder their husbands. The typical client was a woman with a lover; she bought the first dose to give her husband stomach pains, the second to get him to hospital, and the third to kill him. The doctor was, in these cases, unable to ascertain the cause of the deaths. In the Zisa quarter in Palermo, several suspicious cases had occurred. The wife of a baker, a nobleman who had wasted his family's fortune, and another baker's wife (who was thought to have had an affair with a gardener) had all become ill.

=== Trial and execution ===
One day, a friend of Bonanno's, Maria Pitarra, was delivering a poison when she realized that the victim was to be the son of a friend, and decided to warn the mother. The mother made an order for the poison herself, and when Bonanno arrived, she was arrested. The trial opened in October 1788. Bonanno was accused of sorcery. Some of the apothecaries who were selling her potions were called to testify.

The Italian term aceto, that is, "vinegar," was the code-word for Bonnano's poison, a mixture of white wine, arsenic, and vinegar for lice. She referred to it as "arcane vinegar liquor," and an order would be placed for "vinegar." At the time, it was an untraceable poison.

She was executed by hanging on 30 July 1789.
