= Mary, Queen of Scots (play) =

1789 play

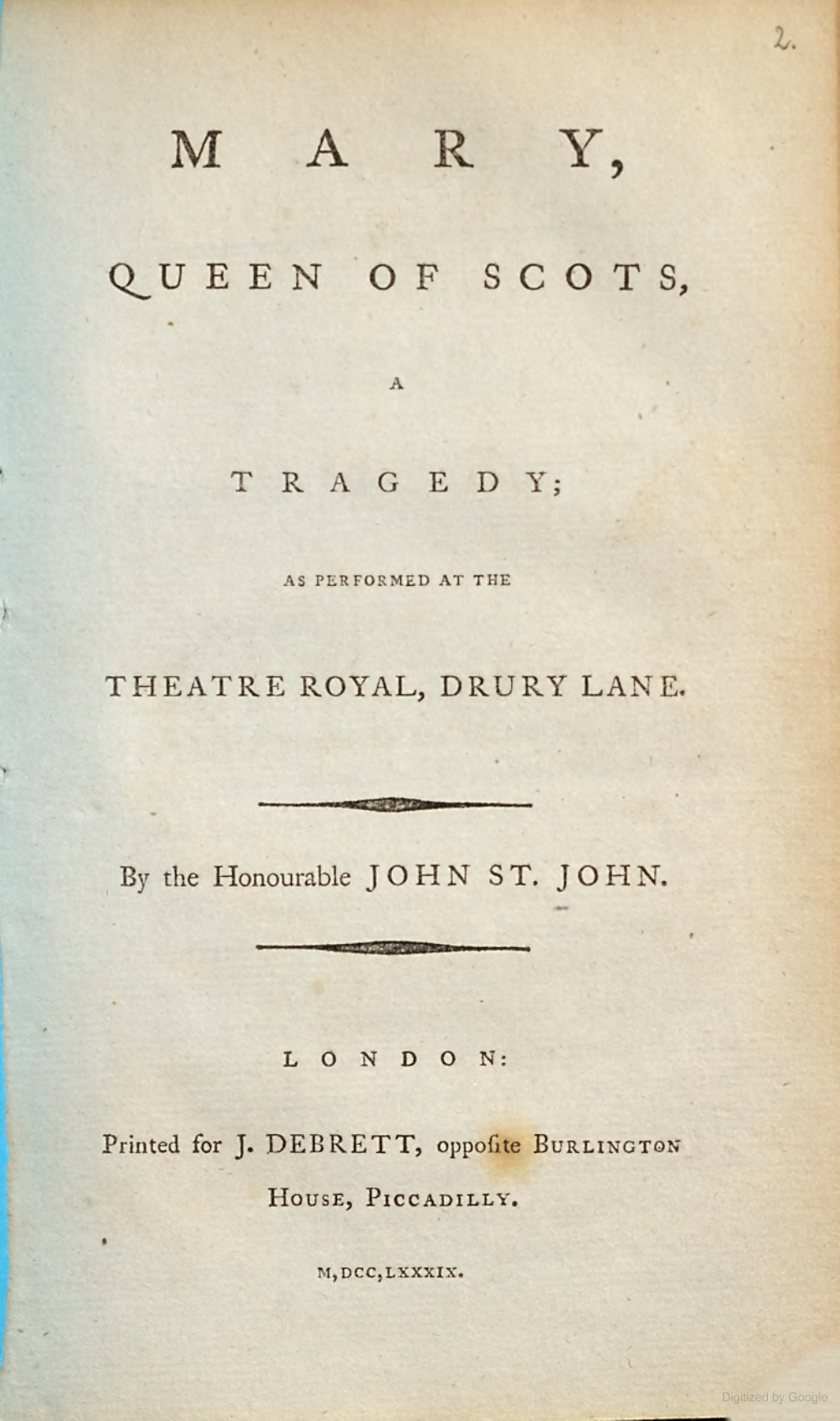
- Written by: John St John
- Original language: English
- Genre: Tragedy
- Setting: England, 16th century

Premiere
- Date premiered: 21 March 1789
- Place premiered: Theatre Royal, Drury Lane, London

Mary, Queen of Scots is a 1789 historical tragedy by the British writer John St John. It premiered at the Theatre Royal, Drury Lane in London on 21 March 1789. Its Irish premiere took place at the Crow Street Theatre in Dublin on 22 December 1802. The original Drury Lane cast included Sarah Siddons as Queen Mary, John Philip Kemble as the Duke of Norfolk, James Aickin as Sir William Cecil, William Barrymore as Lord Herries, John Hayman Packer as Davison, Robert Benson as Earl of Shrewsbury, John Phillimore as Earl of Huntingdon, John Fawcett as Sir Amias Paulet, Matthew Williames as Beton, Sarah Ward as Queen Elizabeth, Jane Farmer as Lady Douglas and Charlotte Tidswell as Lady Scrope.

== Bibliography ==
- Greene, John C. Theatre in Dublin, 1745-1820: A Calendar of Performances, Volume 6. Lexington Books, 2011.
- Nicoll, Allardyce. A History of English Drama 1660–1900: Volume III. Cambridge University Press, 2009.
- Hogan, C.B (ed.) The London Stage, 1660–1800: Volume V. Southern Illinois University Press, 1968.
