= Marcella (play) =

- Written by: William Hayley
- Original language: English
- Genre: Tragedy

Premiere
- Date premiered: 7 November 1789
- Place premiered: Theatre Royal, Drury Lane

Marcella is a 1789 tragedy by the British writer William Hayley.

The original Drury Lane cast included John Philip Kemble as Hernandez, William Barrymore as Alonzo, John Whitfield as Lupercio, Robert Benson as Lopez, Richard Wroughton as Governor of Barcelona and Jane Powell as Marcella.

== Bibliography ==
- Nicoll, Allardyce. A History of English Drama 1660–1900: Volume III. Cambridge University Press, 2009.
- Hogan, C.B (ed.) The London Stage, 1660–1800: Volume V. Southern Illinois University Press, 1968.
