= Porta a Pinti, Florence =

Coordinates: 43.778082°N 11.267444°E

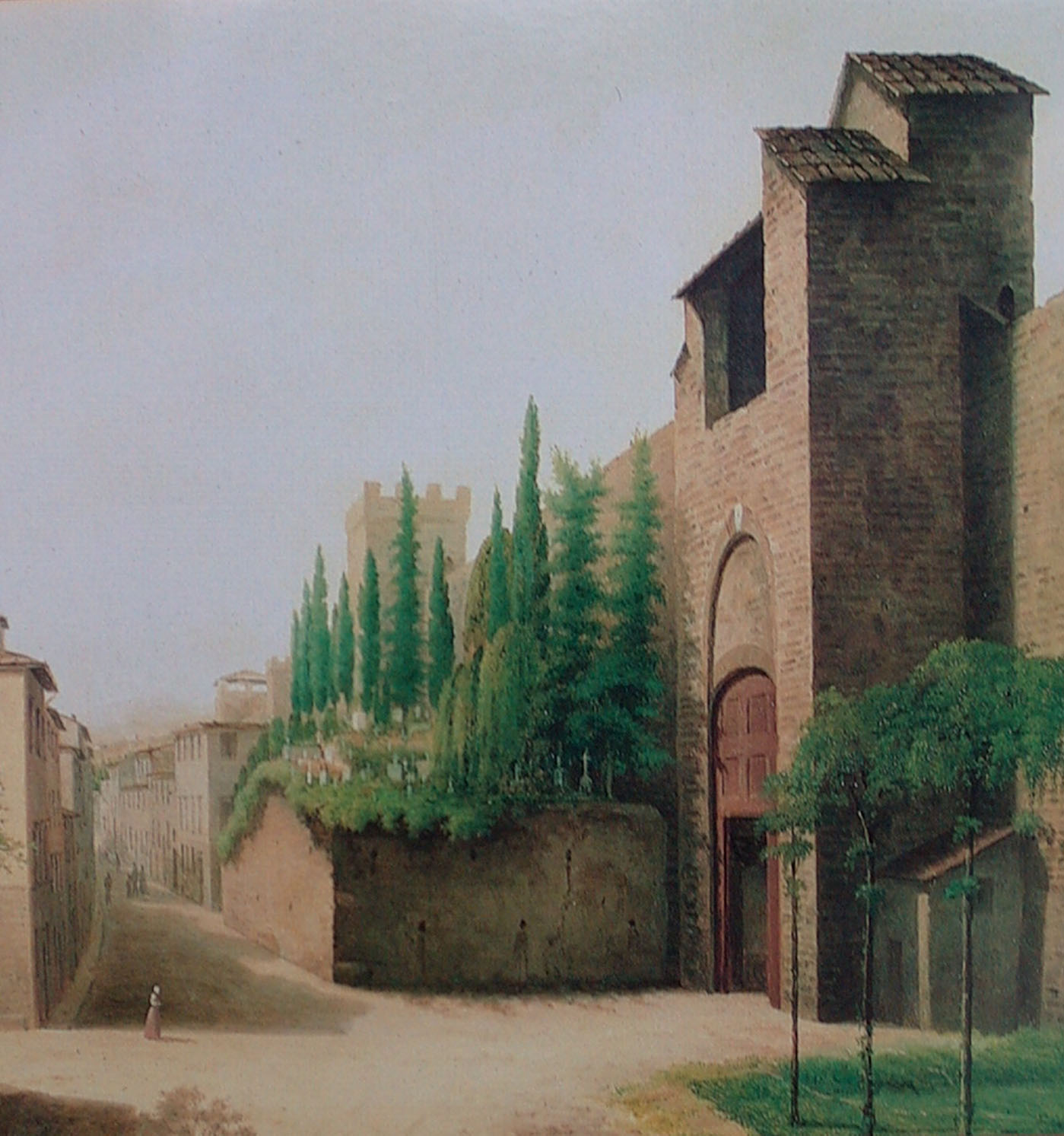
Print of Former Porta a Pinti and wall

Porta a Pinti was a former gate in the walls of Florence, region of Tuscany, Italy. The gate was also called Porta Fiesolana because the road led out to Fiesole, and of di Penitenti, which was shortened and corrupted to give name to the gate and the neighborhood, Borgo Pinti. Individuals returning to church, called convertiti or penitenti, lived in this neighborhood. It was destroyed in 1865 during the creation of the Viale di Circonvallazione, which removed most of the walls of Florence.
