= The Power of Sympathy =

1789 American novel by William Hill Brown

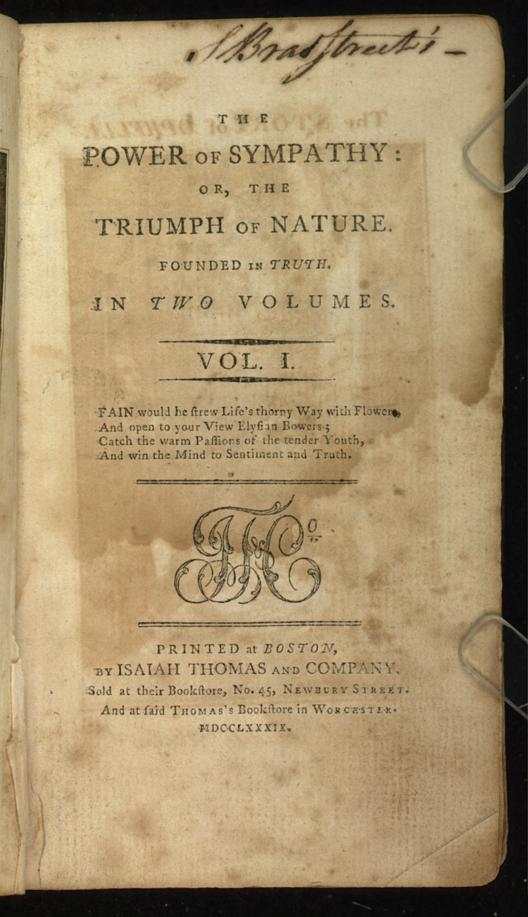
- Title page of the first edition
- Author: William Hill Brown
- Language: English
- Genre: Sentimental novel, Epistolary novel
- Publisher: Isaiah Thomas
- Publication date: January 21, 1789
- Publication place: United States

The Power of Sympathy: or, The Triumph of Nature is a 1789 American sentimental novel written in epistolary form by William Hill Brown and is widely considered to be the first American novel. The Power of Sympathy was Brown's first novel. The characters' struggles illustrate the dangers of seduction and the pitfalls of giving in to one's passions, while advocating the moral education of women and the use of rational thinking as ways to prevent the consequences of such actions.

== Characters ==
- Thomas Harrington
- Myra Harrington, sister to Thomas
- Harriot Fawcet, illegitimate sister to Thomas and Myra
- Jack Worthy
- Mrs. Eliza Holmes, common friend of the Harringtons and Harriot
- Mr. Harrington, Thomas and Myra's father
- Maria, Mr. Harrington's mistress and Harriot's mother
- Martin and Ophelia

== Plot summary ==
The opening letters between Thomas Harrington and Jack Worthy reveal that Thomas has fallen for Harriot Fawcet, despite the reservations of his father. Harriot resists Thomas's initial advances, as he intends to make her his mistress; readers also find that Jack encourages Thomas to abandon his licentious motives in favor of properly courting Harriot. However, when Thomas and Harriot become engaged, Eliza Holmes becomes alarmed and exposes a deep family secret to Thomas's sister Myra: Harriot is in fact Thomas and Myra’s illegitimate half-sister. Mr. Harrington's one time affair with Maria Fawcet resulted in Harriot's birth, which had to be kept a secret to maintain the family’s honor. Thus, Eliza’s mother-in-law, the late Mrs. Holmes, took Maria, Thomas and Harriot into her home. After Maria’s death, Harriot was raised by a family friend, Mrs. Francis.

Upon receiving the news of this family secret, Harriot and Thomas are devastated, as their relationship is incestuous and thus forbidden. Harriot falls into a grief-stricken consumption (a condition now referred to as tuberculosis), from which she is unable to recover. Thomas spirals into a deep depression and commits suicide after learning of Harriot's death.

== Subplot in historical context ==
A subplot in the novel mirrors a local New England scandal involving Brown's neighbor Perez Morton's seduction of Fanny Apthorp; Apthorp was Morton's sister-in-law. Apthorp became pregnant and committed suicide, but Morton was not legally punished. The scandal was widely known, so most readers were able to quickly identify the "real" story behind the fiction: "in every essential, Brown's story is an indictment of Morton and an exoneration of Fanny Apthorp", with "Martin" and "Ophelia" representing Morton and Apthorp, respectively.

== Publication history ==
The Power of Sympathy was first published by Isaiah Thomas in Boston on January 21, 1789, and sold at the price of nine shillings. The novel did not sell well.

The novel was first published anonymously but was popularly attributed to Boston poet Sarah Wentworth Apthorp Morton because of the resemblance between the plot and a scandal in her family; Brown was not correctly identified as the author until 1894.

== Critical discussions ==
The novel has ties to American politics and nationhood, just as many early American sentimental novels can be read as allegorical accounts of the nation's development. These critics have argued that these novels' use of moral education as a means to avoid seduction functions as a way to show readers the virtues and education most needed by the new American nation. Elizabeth Maddock Dillon complicates this standard reading by locating the novel within a global context marked by "forces of colonialism, mercantile capitalism, and imperialism". In this reading, the workings of the novel (incest and miscegenation specifically, Dillon argues) are read not necessarily as indicative of the formation of the American nation but as representative of the effects of colonialism in the New World.

As the novel's title indicates, sympathy is the driving force behind several characters' actions. The excesses of sympathetic thought lead to tragedy; it is implied that Harrington's suicide, for example, is spurred on by an over-identification with The Sorrows of Young Werther, a copy of which is found alongside his body. These excesses are contrasted with the rational thinking of characters like Worthy, who strives to uphold normative social and moral ideals. While the overly sympathetic characters do not survive the course of the novel, the rational characters do survive, suggesting that at the very least, a balance of sympathy and rational thinking (or the use of reason to overcome passion) are necessary for a productive, successful member of society.

Another scholarly discussion surrounding the text is the question of its ability to serve as a didactic text for 18th-century readers, with earlier critics unquestioningly discussing the novel's didactic intent; more recent scholars, however, have questioned the novel's ability to teach morality yet frankly discuss seduction and incest. The novel's preface claims that it is:

Intended to represent the specious causes, and to Expose the fatal CONSEQUENCES, of SEDUCTION; To inspire the Female Mind With a Principle of Self Complacency, and to Promote the Economy of Human Life.

Brown claimed that the purpose of his text was to teach young women how to avoid scandalous errors. Although discussions of seduction and incest are included to illustrate their potential dangers, some scholars have asserted that these issues overshadow the morality lesson and argue that 18th-century readers read such novels for the thrill of taboo discussions, not moral guidance.
