= John St John (died 1793) =

English politician and playwright

The Honorable John St John (c.1746–1793) was an English MP and surveyor general of Crown lands.

He was born the son of John St John, 2nd Viscount St John and brother of Henry St John, 1st Viscount Bolingbroke. He was educated at Eton College and Trinity College, Cambridge. He studied law at Lincoln's Inn in 1765 and the Middle Temple in 1767, being called to the bar in 1770.

He was elected Member of Parliament for Newport, IoW in 1773 and for Eye in 1774. In 1775 he was appointed to the well paid post of Surveyor General of the Land Revenues of the Crown. In 1780 he was elected both for Newport and for Midhurst but chose to sit a second time for Newport.

He wrote a play, Mary, Queen of Scots which was produced in the Theatre Royal, Drury Lane in 1789 with the lead roles performed by John Philip Kemble and Sarah Siddons. He also wrote a two-act opera, The Island of St. Marguerite which was produced at the Theatre Royal the same year.

He was the supporter and lover of the famous courtesan Kitty Kennedy. He died unmarried at his home in London in 1793. His brother Henry erected a monument to him in the church of Lydiard Tregoze, Wiltshire.
