= Bertie Greatheed =

British dramatist (1759–1826)

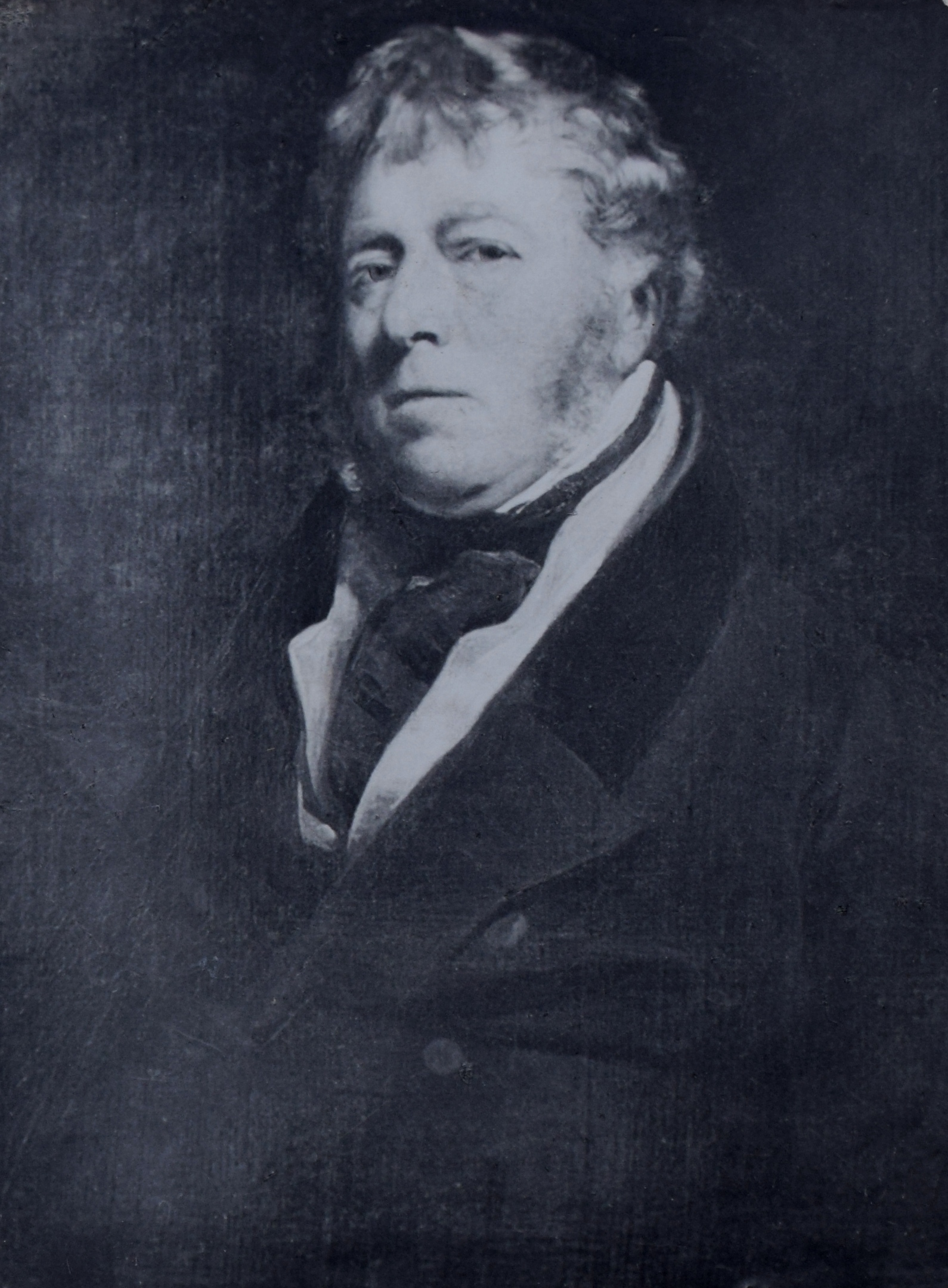
Bertie Greatheed by John Jackson in 1821

Bertie Greatheed (1759–1826) was an English dramatist, slave owner and landowner.

== Life ==
Greatheed was born on 19 October 1759, the son of the MP Samuel Greatheed of Guy's Cliffe, near Warwick, and his wife Lady Mary Bertie, daughter of Peregrine Bertie, 2nd Duke of Ancaster.

After the deaths of his parents, he inherited Guy's Cliffe Estate in Warwick, which had been bought by his father, and the Caribbean plantation on St Kitts near the capital, Basseterre, which had been established by his grandfather, John Greatheed. He also inherited land in Lincolnshire through his mother's family.

The majority of his income in his earlier life came from the St Kitts plantation, although he also had some income from his land holdings in Warwick. He invested his wealth in the development of the Georgian spa town at Leamington Priors, which later became known as Leamington Spa. He owned building plots on either side of what is now the Parade in Leamington, and was a partner in the Royal Pump Rooms, which was located on five acres of his land.

The Canaries plantation was managed on Greatheed's behalf by his uncle Craister until 1772, and then by Richard Greatheed, another family member. In the early 1780s, the estate paid tax on over 230 enslaved people, and in 1788 made profits of £380, which was considered a bad year. Correspondence between Greatheed and his St Kitts plantation managers is now archived at Warwickshire County Record Office, and includes information about the trade of enslaved people, production of sugar and rum and the profits of the estate. Bertie Greatheed supported the abolition of slavery, and described the plantation as his "odious property", however he continued to own enslaved people. In 1835, his descendants, including Lord Charles Greatheed Bertie Percy, the husband of his granddaughter, received £1,223 6s 7d in compensation after the Slavery Abolition Act 1833.

== Family ==
In 1780, Greatheed married his first cousin, Ann Greatheed, who was born in St Kitts. They had one son, also called Bertie, born in 1781.

Greatheed travelled extensively throughout Europe with his family, and resided in Germany, France and Italy. In 1803, they were detained in Paris as prisoners of war, alongside many other British families. The younger Bertie Greatheed was becoming recognised as an artist, and his painting of Napoleon Bonaparte impressed the Emperor's family and probably gave the Greatheed's favourable treatment. Whilst staying in Vicenza in Italy, his son died suddenly of influenza on 8 October 1804, aged 23. Shortly after his son's death, it was revealed he had an illegitimate daughter, Ann Caroline, with a woman in Dresden. Ann Caroline was brought to England by her grandparents and raised at Guys Cliffe. She married Lord Charles Greatheed Bertie Percy, son of Algernon Percy, 1st Earl of Beverley on 20 March 1823.

== Works ==
When residing in Florence he became a member of the society called Gli Oziosi. Greatheed was a contributor to the privately printed collection of fugitive pieces of the Gli Oziosi, the Arno Miscellany (Florence, 1784). The following year he contributed to the Florence Miscellany (Florence, 1785), a collection of poems by the Della-Cruscans. Greatheed was termed by William Gifford the Reuben of the Della-Cruscans, in his satirical Baviad and Mæviad.

A blank verse tragedy by Greatheed, The Regent was brought out at Drury Lane Theatre on 1 April 1788, supported by John Kemble and Sarah Siddons; it ran for nine nights. The epilogue was furnished by Hester Piozzi. A reviewer included "The plot is altogether interesting; but the scene in which the child is introduced is too horrid an outrage upon the feelings, and such as the state the English stage will not sanction. Here the audience Strongly expressed their disapprobation." The author later published it with a dedication to Mrs. Siddons, who had once been an attendant upon his mother, and was his frequent guest at Guy's Cliffe.
