= William Hill Brown =

American novelist (1765–1793)

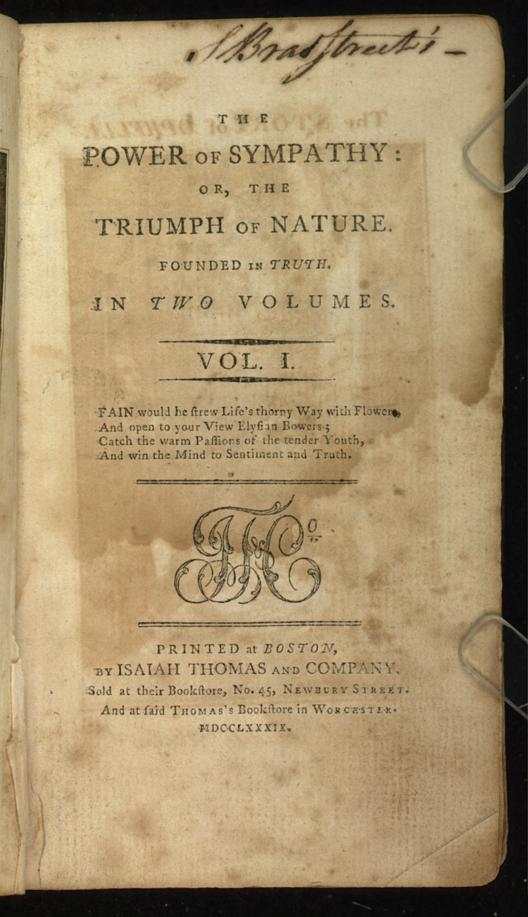
The Power of Sympathy by William Hill Brown (1789), title page

William Hill Brown (November 12, 1765 – September 2, 1793) was an American novelist, the author of what is usually considered the first American novel, The Power of Sympathy (1789), and "Harriot, or the Domestic Reconciliation", as well as the serial essay "The Reformer", published in Isaiah Thomas' Massachusetts Magazine.

== Life ==
Brown was born in Boston, Massachusetts, the son of Gawen Brown and his third wife, Elizabeth Hill Adams. Gawen Brown was from Northumberland, England and was a clockmaker. William was christened at the Hollis Street Church on December 1, 1765.

In 1789, William Brown published the novel The Power of Sympathy. Brown had an extensive knowledge of European literature, for example of Clarissa by Samuel Richardson, but tries to lift the American literature from the British corpus by choice of an American setting. The book drew close comparison to a local scandal and was subsequently withdrawn from sale. He contributed a number of essays to the Columbian Centinel.

Around October 1792, Brown himself withdrew to join his sister, Eliza Brown Hinchborne, at the Hinchborne plantation near Murfreesboro, North Carolina, and began to read law with William Richardson Davie at Halifax. Eliza died in January 1793. Not yet acclimated to the Eastern North Carolina climate, William Brown died of fever, probably malaria, the following August, at the age of twenty-seven.

== Works ==
Brown held the conviction that novels should aim at some high moral purpose.

- Harriot, or the Domestic Reconciliation (1789)
- The Power of Sympathy (1789)
- Selected Poems and Verse Fables 1784–1793 by William Hill Brown (posthumous)
- Ira and Isabella (1807)
