= List of crossings of the River Avon, Warwickshire =

This is a list of crossings of the River Avon in England (including bridges, tunnels, ferries and fords), in order from its source in Northamptonshire, through or adjoining the counties of Leicestershire, Northamptonshire, Warwickshire, and Worcestershire, to its confluence with the River Severn at Tewkesbury in Gloucestershire.

== Crossings ==
Key to heritage status
Status	Criteria
SM	Scheduled monument. Nationally important archaeological bridge.
I	Grade I listed. Bridge of exceptional interest, sometimes considered to be internationally important
II*	Grade II* listed. Particularly important bridge of more than special interest
II	Grade II listed. Bridge of national importance and special interest

In order, moving downstream:

Crossing	Date	Coordinates	Heritage status	Locality	Notes	Image
Source of the River Avon	n/a	52.3975°N 0.9887°W	n/a	Naseby, Northamptonshire	Included for completeness	
M1 motorway	1965-1968	52.395144°N 1.172958°W	n/a	Lilbourne/Catthorpe (river forms county boundary between Northamptonshire & Leicestershire here)	Elevated motorway over floodplain of infant river and disused railway	
Dow Bridge	1838	52.396599°N 1.202795°W	II	Newton	Disused. Incorporates parts of a circa 1776 bridge which it replaced. Marks the tri-point of Northamptonshire, Leicestershire and Warwickshire.	
Dow bridge (new)	1930s	52.39655°N 1.20297°W		Newton	Replaced the earlier Dow Bridge. Carries the A5.	
Midland Counties Railway Viaduct	1840	52.384531°N 1.263976°W	II	Rugby	Disused railway viaduct; now pedestrians only.	
Bretford Bridge	18th century	52.389186°N 1.370108°W	II	Bretford, Brandon and Bretford	Stone road bridge of 13th century origin, largely rebuilt to the original design in the 18th century. Carries the A428 road over one semi-circular and 4 pointed arches.	
Brandon Viaduct (or Avon Viaduct)	1838	52.38126°N 1.39964°W	II	Brandon and Bretford	Carries the Birmingham Loop of the West Coast Main Line; built as part of part of the London and Birmingham Railway.	
Stare Bridge	Late 15th century	52.34000°N 1.51777°W	II*	Stoneleigh	9 arches.	
Chesford Bridge (A452)		52.325969°N 1.556909°W		Blackdown	Vehicle and pedestrian. Stone, five arches.	Chesford_Bridge_-_geograph.org.uk_-_5301890
Hill Wootton Road		52.319289°N 1.546806°W		Blackdown	Vehicle and pedestrian.	Double_arch_-_geograph.org.uk_-_1703524
Old Milverton rail viaduct		52.308954°N 1.561267°W		Old Milverton	Multiple arch brick rail viaduct	
Saxon Mill		52.301024°N 1.573214°W	II	Leek Wootton and Guy's Cliffe	Weir and foot bridge	
Sir Anthony Eden Way	2007	52.291122°N 1.559741°W		Leamington Spa and Warwick	Road bridge, named for Anthony Eden.	
Portobello Bridge	1831	52.289216°N 1.560064°W	II	Leamington Spa and Warwick	Three span stone bridge.	
Grand Union Canal	1800	52.286378°N 1.560452°W		Leamington Spa	Aqueduct	
Chiltern Main Line	1852 (original)	52.284757°N 1.563156°W		Warwick	Metal railway viaduct	
Charter Bridge	1996	52.282894°N 1.571323°W		Warwick	Metal pedestrian and cycle bridge	
Castle Bridge	1793	52.279629°N 1.579537°W	II*	Warwick	Replaced Old Castle Bridge.	
Old Castle Bridge	1208 or before	52.279214°N 1.583308°W	II*	Warwick	Destroyed 1795. Impassible ruins only remain.	
[Unnamed bridge]		52.279214°N 1.583308°W		Warwick	Footbridge only, wooden, on private land. Part of the Warwick Castle estate	
Leafield Bridge	1772	52.26484°N 1.59195°W	II	Warwick	A stone bridge designed by Robert Mylne.	
M40 motorway		52.2569°N 1.5980°W			A pair of adjacent bridges, one for each carriageway.	
Barford	18th century	52.2463°N 1.6092°W	II	Barford	Five sandstone arches.	Barford_Bridge_-_geograph.org.uk_-_5749270
Barford Bypass		52.2462°N 1.6105°W		Barford		Old_and_new_bridges_at_Barford,_Warks_-_geograph.org.uk_-_1197660
Hampton Lucy Bridge	1829	52.2121°N 1.62442°W	II	Hampton Lucy	Cast iron.	
[Unnamed]		52.20294°N 1.68349°W		Avon Caravan Park, Tiddington		
Clopton Bridge	1484 (circa)	52.19155°N 1.700311°W	SM	Stratford-upon-Avon	Replaced a timber bridge first mentioned in 1235.	
Tramway Bridge	1823	52.191049°N 1.701417°W	II	Stratford-upon-Avon	Eight brick arches which carried a horse tramway, now pedestrian only.	
Stratford-upon-Avon chain ferry	1937	52.189035°N 1.705475°W		Stratford-upon-Avon	Manually operated chain ferry.	
Lucy's Mill bridge		52.18380°N 1.70811°W		Stratford-upon-Avon	footbridge	
Seven Meadows Road bridge		52.18368°N 1.70826°W		Stratford-upon-Avon	A4390	
Stratford Greenway		52.17767°N 1.72654°W		Stratford-upon-Avon	Former railway	
Binton Bridge	1783 (circa)	52.17561°N 1.78955°W	II	Welford-on-Avon	Passes over an island in the river on seven arches of Blue Lias.	
Bidford Bridge	early 15th century	52.16402°N 1.85666°W	SM	Bidford-on-Avon, Warwickshire	Eight arch bridge of limestone.	
George Billington Lock footbridge		52.12280°N 1.90570°W			Only crosses navigation arm	River_Avon_-_geograph.org.uk_-_6574715
Simon de Montford Bridge		52.1059°N 1.9293°W		near Greenhill, Worcestershire	Carries A46.	
Even Railway Bridge		52.0972°N 1.9357°W		Evesham	Cotswold Line (railway)	
Workman Bridge	1856	52.091492°N 1.943074°W	II	Evesham	A stone bridge of three arches.	
Abbey Bridge		52.08636°N 1.95190°W		Evesham		
Cotswold Line (2)		52.10081°N 1.95451°W		Evesham	Railway	
Evesham Golf Course Railway Bridge		52.11833°N 2.00606°W		Fladbury	Cotswold Line (railway)	River_Avon_-_geograph.org.uk_-_6571797
Jubilee Bridge	1935	52.108647°N 2.000848°W		Fladbury	Replaced an earlier bridge, named for the Golden Jubilee of Queen Victoria	
[Unnamed pipeline]		52.10635°N 2.03073°W		Fladbury	No pedestrian access	
Pershore Old Bridge	probably late C15	52.104551°N 2.070998°W	SM	Pershore	Now pedestrian/ cycle only. Five span bridge of sandstone with a red brick parapet.	
Pershore Bridge		52.104200°N 2.071316°W		Pershore	Replaced Pershore Old Bridge	
Nafford Lock		52.0751°N 2.0885°W			Chain of three bridges, via island; pedestrians only	
Eckington Bridge	1720 (circa)	52.0793°N 2.1149°W	II*	Eckington, Worcestershire	Carries the B4080 road. First bridge at the site was built in 1440, replacing an earlier ferry.	
Defford Railway Bridge		52.0805°N 2.1220°W			Birmingham and Gloucester Railway	
Strensham Lock		52.06034°N 2.12369°W		Eckington, Worcestershire	Chain of small bridges and islands	
M5 motorway		52.03063°N 2.12547°W			A pair of parallel bridges, one for each carriageway.	
Tewkesbury Quay		51.99887°N 2.15476°W		Tewkesbury, Gloucestershire		West_bank_of_the_Avon,_Tewkesbury_-_geograph.org.uk_-_3777818
Tewkesbury and Malvern Railway bridge		51.99888°N 2.15474°W			Demolished and replaced with a footbridge	
King John's Bridge	1190 (circa); restructured 1824	51.9978°N 2.1567°W	II*	Tewkesbury	Crosses the bifurcated Avon, twice, via an island, on five sandstone arches. Carries the A38, Mythe Road.	
Confluence with River Severn	n/a	51.9964°N 2.1634°W	n/a	Tewkesbury	Included for completeness	
