= Leek Wootton =

Village in Warwickshire, England

Coordinates: 52°19′5″N 1°34′35″W

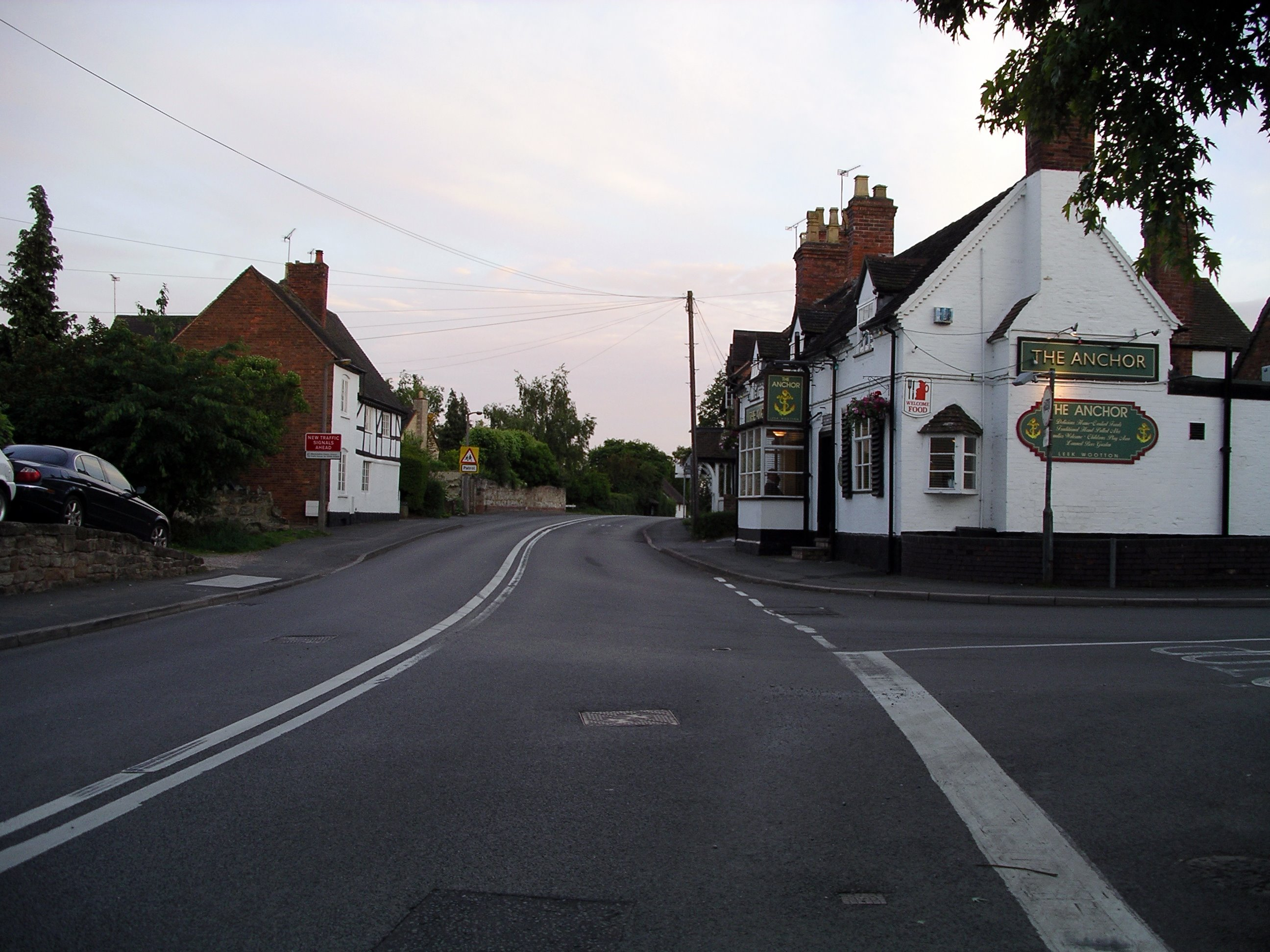
- Leek Wootton from the main road

- Location within Warwickshire
- Civil parish: Leek Wootton and Guy's Cliffe
- District: Warwick
- Shire county: Warwickshire
- Region: West Midlands
- Country: England
- Sovereign state: United Kingdom
- Post town: WARWICK
- Postcode district: CV35
- Dialling code: 01926
- Police: Warwickshire
- Fire: Warwickshire
- Ambulance: West Midlands

Leek Wootton is a village and former civil parish, now in the parish of Leek Wootton and Guy's Cliffe, in the Warwick district, in the county of Warwickshire, England, approximately 2 miles (3.2 km) south of Kenilworth and 2.5 miles (4.0 km) north of Warwick. It lies in the triangle created by Kenilworth, Warwick and Leamington Spa. In 1961 the parish had a population of 671.

== Geography ==
The civil parish of Leek Wootton and Guy's Cliffe, including the hamlets of Hill Wootton, Chesford, Goodrest, North and Middle Woodloes, has a population of approximately 1,100. The village is adjacent to the A46 dual-carriageway trunk road. The nearest railway station is Warwick town with Warwick Parkway further away. The nearest airport is Birmingham Airport (11.7 miles).

There are numerous public footpaths and walks in the parish, including the Tink-a-Tank, (believed to have been named because people used to use the path to walk to church and think about God and thank him for his blessings), several across the golf courses, a woodland walk between the Coventry Road (B4115), which crosses the A46 road and comes out at the north end of the village on the Warwick Road, and a small area of woodland to the north west of the village (accessed from Waller Close and the Recreation Ground). To the north of Leek Wootton is the Cattle Brook and just north of Hill Wootton this meets the much larger River Avon, which forms the south-eastern boundary of the Parish.

== History ==
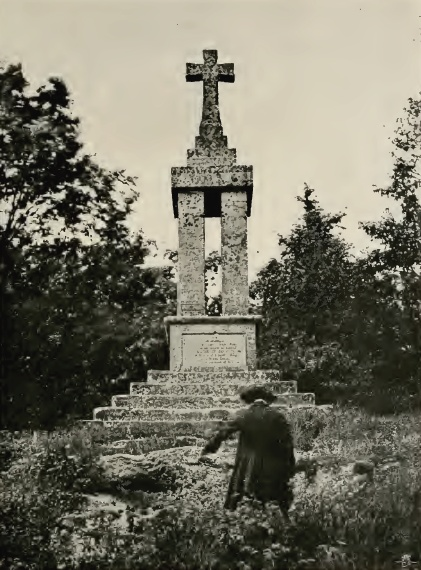
The 1823 Gaveston monument at Blacklow Hill.

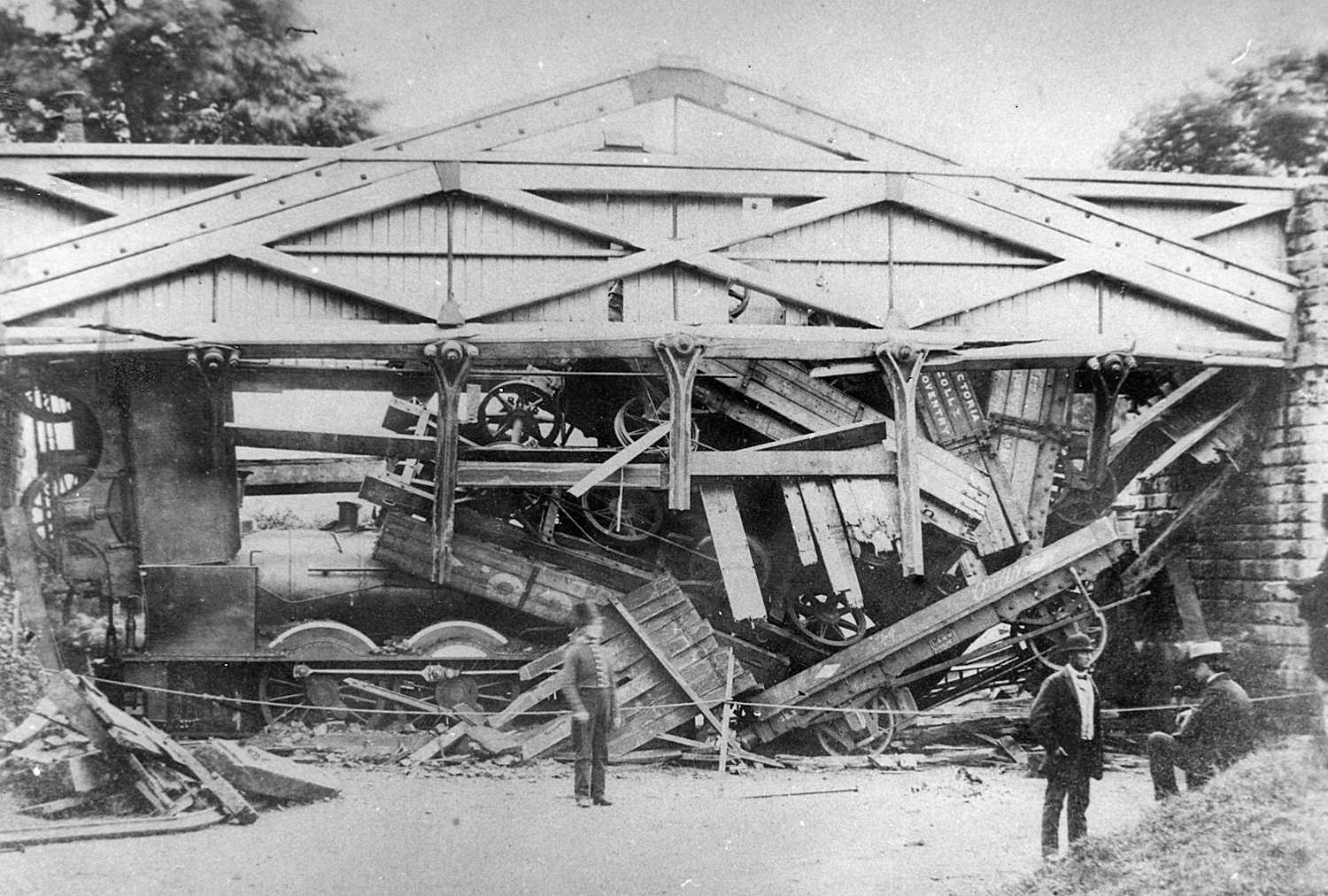
Wootton bridge collapse 11 June 1861

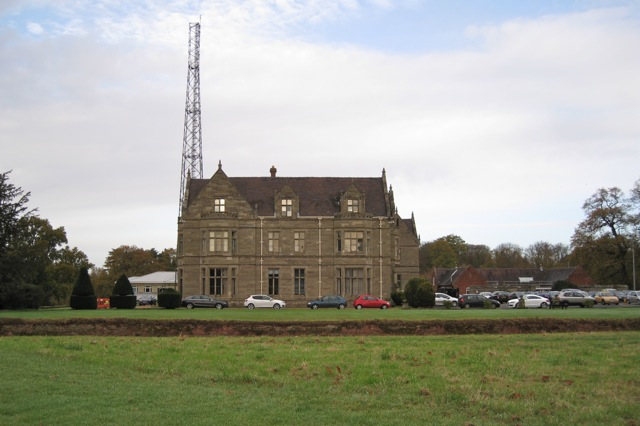
Woodcote, once the home of the Wise family, former HQ of Warwickshire Police

Blacklow Hill is located south of the village, close to the A46 road. Its name comes from the fact the trees that partly cover it are very dark (black) and the Anglo-Saxon hlaew (burial mound). In 1971 an archaeological team found flints and hunting tools from the early Mesolithic period, around 9,000 B.C., and three graves of Anglo-Saxon origin.

The monument Gaveston's Cross is in the wood on the hill. It marks the point where Piers Gaveston was murdered. In 1308 Edward II travelled to Boulogne to marry Isabella, leaving Piers Gaveston, a Gascon knight to act as regent. Resentment against the king's rule and Gaveston's position of power grew, some barons began to demand the banishment of Gaveston. Edward could do little to prevent Gaveston being captured in 1312, under the orders of the Earl of Lancaster and his allies. He was captured first by the Earl of Warwick, whom he was seen to have offended, and handed over to two Welshmen. They took him to Blacklow Hill and murdered him; one ran him through the heart with his sword and the other beheaded him.

The railway bridge over the road, between Leek Wootton and Hill Wootton, on the Coventry to Leamington Line, collapsed in a railway accident on 11 June 1861, with the driver and fireman being killed.

On 1 April 1986 the parish was abolished and merged with Guy's Cliffe to form "Leek Wootton and Guy's Cliffe".

== Local economy and services ==
=== All Saints' Church, Leek Wootton ===
The parish church is All Saints', an Anglican church centred in the middle of the village. The current vicar of the church is The Reverend Jim Perryman.

=== All Saints' CofE Academy, Leek Wootton ===
When Leek Wootton First School was threatened with closure in the early 1990s, the community campaigned to save it and a new school was built at the southern end of the village and All Saints' Church of England (Voluntary Aided) Primary School was opened in 1996 by The Right Reverend Simon Barrington-Ward, Bishop of Coventry. Since 1 September 2014 All Saints’ and Burton Green Primary Schools have been working together as a federation of schools. On 1 March 2018 All Saints' and Burton Green schools became academies and members of the Coventry Diocesan Multi-Academy Trust. On 24 April 2018 The Right Reverend Christopher Cocksworth, Bishop of Coventry, attended both schools to formally welcome them into the trust.

=== Leek Wootton War Memorial Recreation Ground ===
The War Memorial Recreation Ground is to the north-west of the village. "The Rec" as it is known locally is home to a children's playground, Leek Wootton Village Hall and Leek Wootton Sports Club, which includes a cricket club that competes in the Cotswold Hills League, and a junior football club.

=== The Warwickshire Golf and Country Club ===
Leek Wootton is home to The Warwickshire Golf and Country Club, and has the Anchor Inn public house at its centre. The Chesford Grange Hotel also falls within the boundaries of the civil parish, as does the Saxon Mill at Guy's Cliffe. The Warwickshire Golf and Country Club is an exclusive members only club and comprises two 18-hole golf courses, a par-3 course and a comprehensive leisure centre with gym, indoor pools, and spa.

=== Woodcote House and Estate ===
Woodcote is a 19th-century manor house and estate on the western boundary of the village. During the Second World War it was repurposed as a convalescent home for military personnel and was home to the headquarters of Warwickshire Police from 1949. A new purpose-built headquarters for the Police at Woodcote was proposed, but the planning application was refused by Warwick District Council on 31 October 2007. A revised application was subsequently approved, but the site was not redeveloped. In 2011 it was announced that Woodcote was to be sold, and the headquarters relocated to Leamington Spa. Following the construction of a new control room in Warwick and the inclusion of some of the estate in a local housing planning allocation, the site was put up for sale in 2018. On 1 April 2019 Warwickshire Police announced that, due to the collapse of its alliance with West Mercia Police, Warwickshire Police would be returning to Woodcote and it would become the Service's headquarters again. This resulted in the sale of the estate being halted.

=== Community Events ===
In 2016, for HM The Queen's 90th Birthday celebrations, the annual Church Garden Fete was amalgamated into a Parish Fete held on "The Rec". This has remained a regular event, with a break in 2020 and 2021 due to COVID-19. In 2022 a Big Jubilee Lunch was held instead for HM The Queen's Platinum Jubilee.

Leek Wootton & District Horticultural Society holds an Annual Flower Show at the Village hall on the Saturday of the weekend before the August Bank Holiday. There are various gardening, cooking and household classes and children's competitions, ranging from miniature gardens to digital art. Unclaimed entries are entered into an arction of produce at the end of the event.
