= Clopton Bridge =

Bridge in Stratford-upon-Avon, England

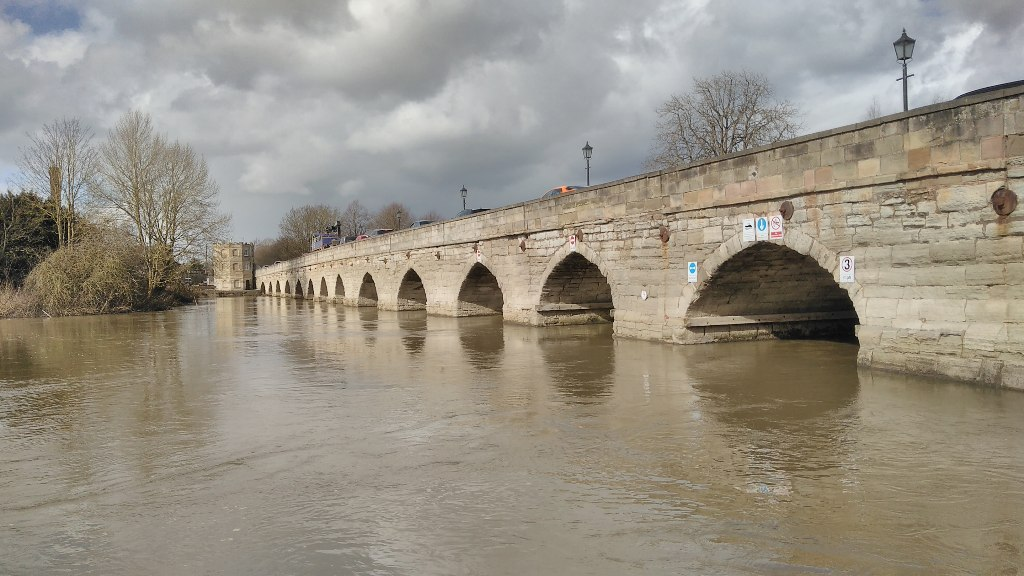
- South-west facing side of the bridge. The former toll house is seen at the far end of the bridge, on the same side of the River Avon as Stratford-upon-Avon town centre.
- Coordinates: 52.19155°N 1.70031°W
- Carries: A3400 road, pedestrians
- Crosses: River Avon
- Locale: Stratford-upon-Avon, Warwickshire, England
- Next downstream: Tramway Bridge

Characteristics
- Design: Masonry arch bridge with toll house
- Material: Stone (with 19th-century cast-iron footway)
- Total length: Approx. 152 m (500 ft)
- No. of spans: 14

History
- Opened: c. 1484
- Rebuilt: 1524, 1588, 1642, 1696, 1811 (widened), 1827 (footway added)

Statistics
- Toll: Former toll bridge (toll house added in 1814)

Listed Building – Grade I
- Official name: Clopton Bride and attached former Toll House, Bridge Foot
- Designated: 25 October 1951
- Reference no.: 1204167

Scheduled monument
- Official name: Clopton Bridge
- Reference no.: 1003739

Location
- Interactive map of Clopton Bridge

The Clopton Bridge is a Late Medieval masonry arch bridge with 14 pointed arches, located in Stratford-upon-Avon, Warwickshire, England, which spans the River Avon, crossing at the place where the river was forded in Saxon times, and which gave the town its name. The bridge is still in use carrying the A3400 road over the river, and is grade I listed.

The bridge was built in around 1484, financed by Hugh Clopton of Clopton House, who later became Lord Mayor of London. It replaced a timber bridge which was first mentioned in 1235, and which had been described by John Leland as; "but a poore Bridge of Timber, and no causey [causeway] to come to it", "very smaulle and ille, and at hygh waters very harde to passe by".

Two arches were rebuilt in 1524. The bridge was again repaired in 1588 following flooding, and in 1642 after an arch had been destroyed to block the army of Oliver Cromwell. In 1696, money was raised to heighten the parapets, which were as low as four inches in places. The bridge was widened on the north side (upstream) in 1811, and a ten-sided toll house tower added in 1814. A cast-iron footbridge was added to the north side in 1827.

John Leland described the bridge as; "a great and sumptuous Bridge upon Avon at the East Ende of the Towne, which hath 14 great Arches of Stone and long Causey made of Stone, low walled on each side, at the West Ende of the Bridge."

The bridge is now a Grade I listed building and a scheduled monument.

== See also ==
- List of crossings of the River Avon, Warwickshire
