= Guy's Cliffe =

Hamlet in Warwickshire, England

Coordinates: 52.2988°N 1.5723°W

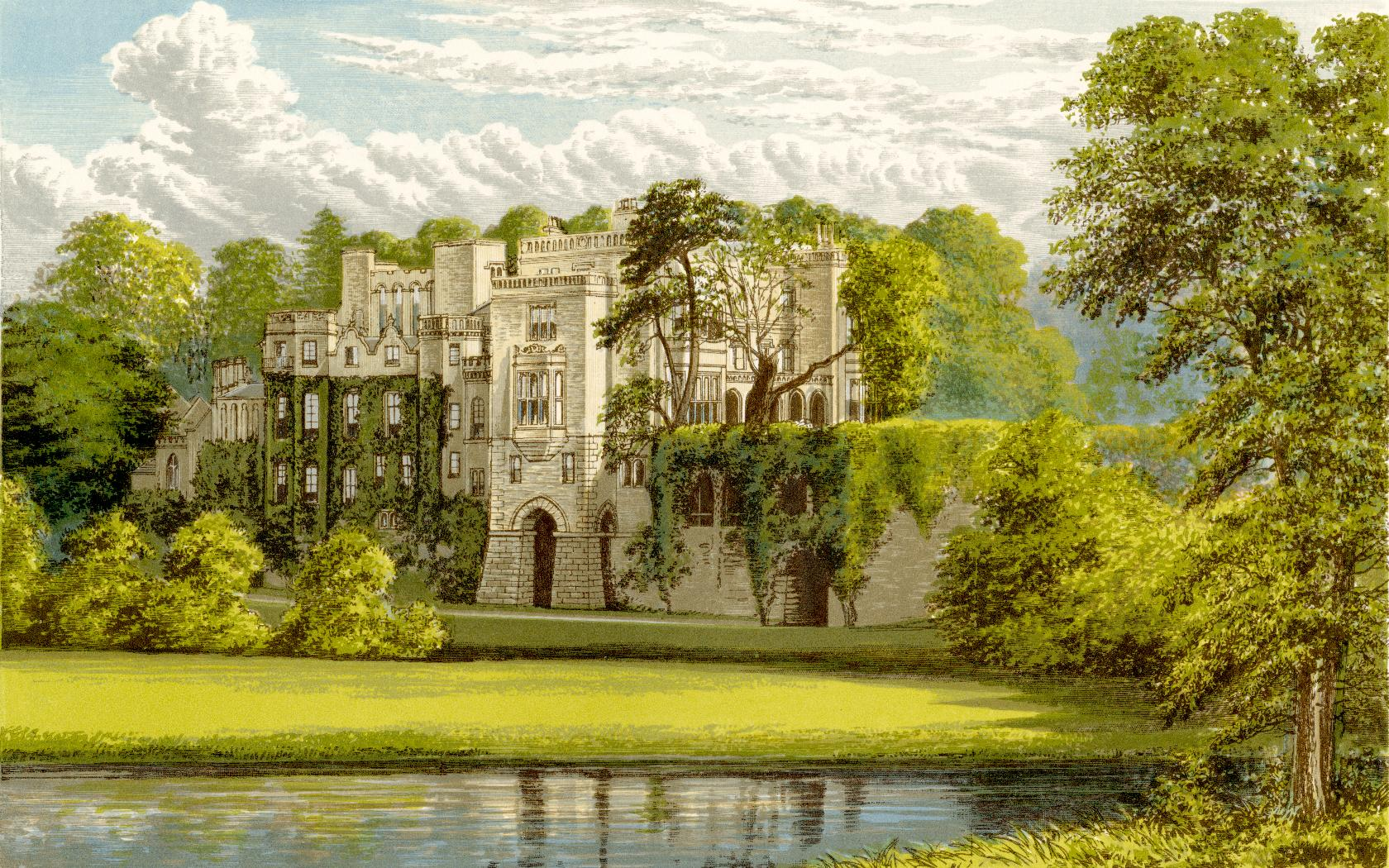
- The manor house at Guy's Cliffe, c. 1880

- Location within Warwickshire
- Civil parish: Leek Wootton and Guy's Cliffe
- District: Warwick
- Shire county: Warwickshire
- Region: West Midlands
- Country: England
- Sovereign state: United Kingdom

Guy's Cliffe (variously spelled with and without an apostrophe and a final "e") is a hamlet and former civil parish on the River Avon and the Coventry Road between Warwick and Leek Wootton, in the parish of Leek Wootton and Guy's Cliffe, in the Warwick district, in Warwickshire, England, near Old Milverton. In 1961 the parish had a population of 2.

== Civil parish ==
It is in the civil parish of Leek Wootton and Guy's Cliffe; the latter was ecclesiastically on the same boundaries a minor chapelry. The secular version of the unit (i.e. civil parish) was, for a time, the least populous third-tier local authority in England; from 1 April 1986 it was merged with Leek Wootton to become "Leek Wootton and Guy's Cliffe" civil parish. Guy's Cliffe became a parish in 1858.

The name Guy's Cliffe originates from the name of the country house and estate that the land belonged to, which in turn was named after the cliff which the house itself was built on. The house has been in a ruined state since the late 20th century and is on the Heritage at Risk Register due to significant problems.

== History ==
=== Before 1900 ===
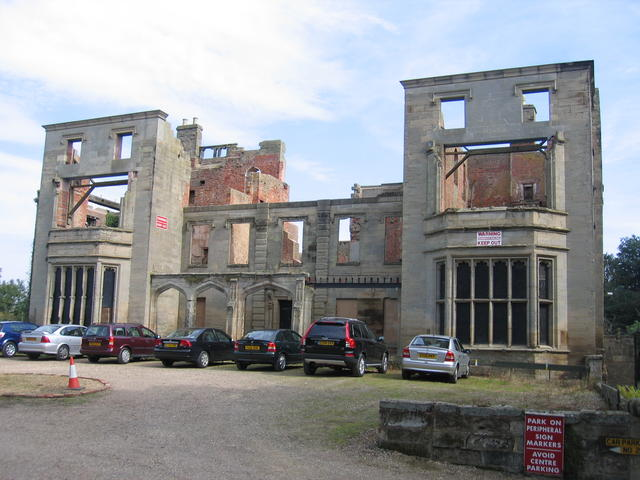
Guy's Cliffe, 2006

Guy's Cliffe has been around since Saxon times and derives its name from the legendary Guy of Warwick. Guy is supposed to have retired to a hermitage on this site, which legend led to the founding of a chantry. The chantry was established in 1423 as the Chapel of St Mary Magdelene and the rock-carved stables and storehouses still remain. After the Dissolution of the Monasteries by Henry VIII the site passed into private hands.

The current, ruined house dates from 1751 and was started by Samuel Greatheed, a West India slave-owner, merchant and Member of Parliament for Coventry 1747-1761. His son Bertie Greatheed inherited the estate after the death of his mother in 1774 and further improved the house and grounds in 1810 to heighten the picturesque qualities of the site.

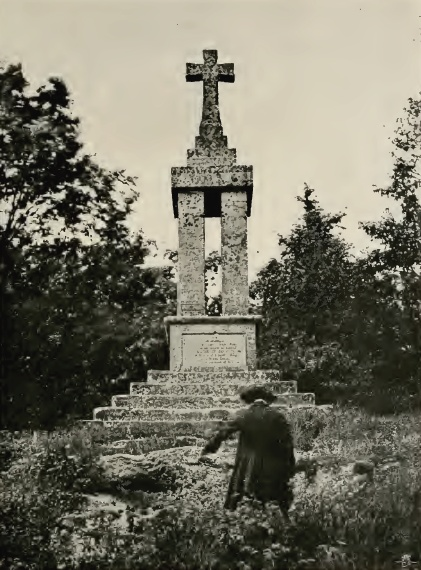
The 1821 Gaveston monument at Blacklow Hill.

The estate also included a mill, stables, kitchen garden and land as far as Blacklow Hill to the north-west of the house. It is the site of an ancient settlement and the location of Piers Gaveston, 1st Earl of Cornwall's murder. In 1821 Bertie Greatheed erected a stone cross to mark the execution, ‘Gaveston's Cross’, and later commented in his diary that he could read the inscription on the cross with his telescope from the house.

=== 1900 onwards ===
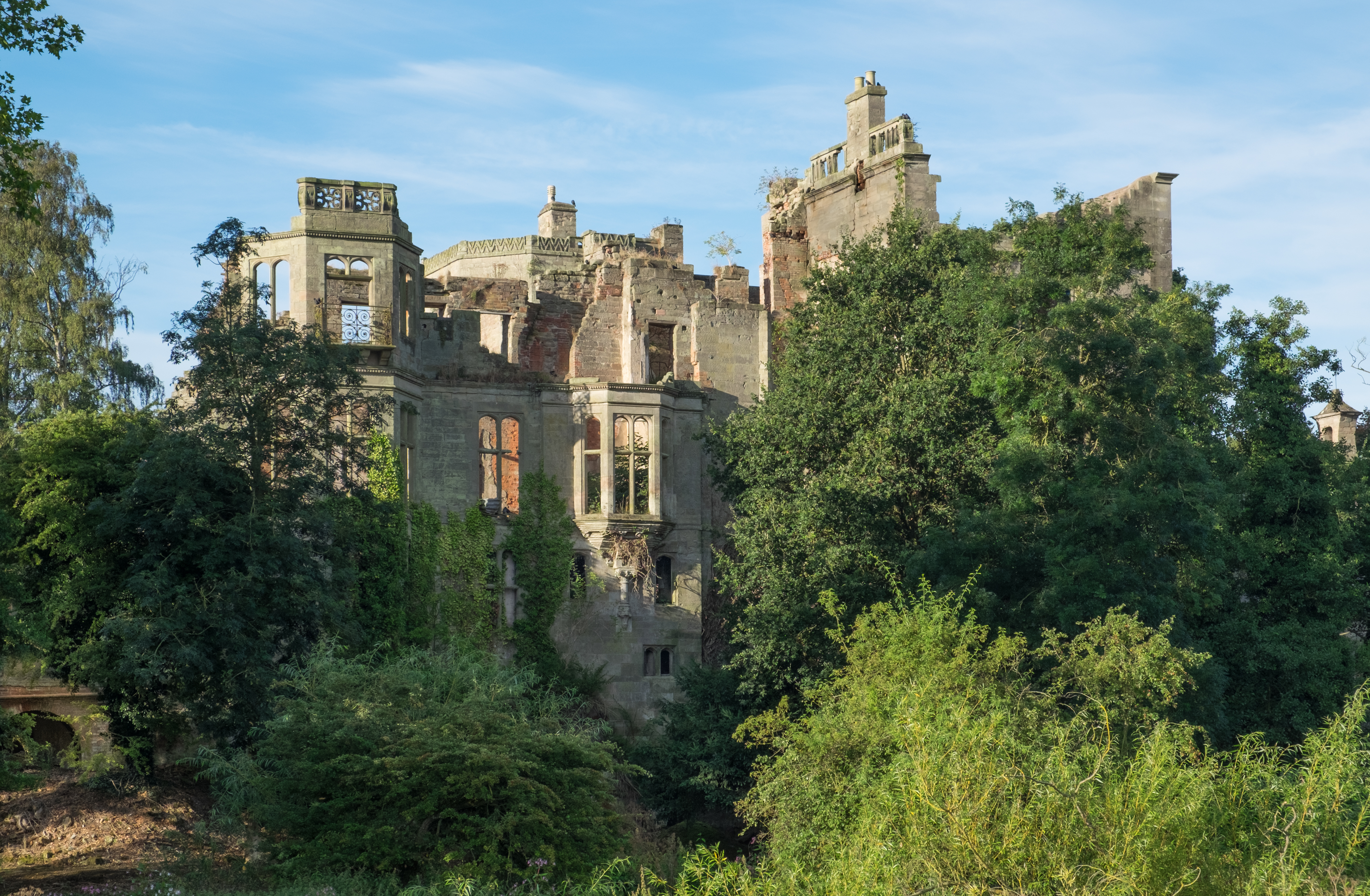
The ruin from across the river in 2016

The house was used as a hospital during World War I and in World War II became a school for evacuated children.

Guy's Cliffe estate was broken up and sold in 1947. In 1952 the mill became a pub and restaurant and was named The Saxon Mill, the stables became a riding school and the kitchen garden became a nursery, all of which still exist today. A toll house also stood by the road to the north of the Saxon Mill but was demolished in the mid 20th century.

The new owner of the house intended to convert it into a hotel but the plans came to nothing and the house fell into disrepair. In 1955 the house was purchased by Aldwyn Porter and the chapel leased to the Freemasons, establishing a connection with the Masons that remains today. The roof had fallen in by 1966. In 1992, during the filming of The Adventures of Sherlock Holmes (The Last Vampyre), a fire scene got out of control and seriously damaged the building, leading to an insurance claim. English Heritage has given the building grade II listed status.

One new house was built within the grounds, Guy's Cliffe House (note: the ruined house), and by the 1980s, when the parishes merged, the population of the Parish of Guy's Cliffe was no more than four people. The new boundary split the original estate: the stables and nursery are not within the current Parish of Leek Wootton & Guy's Cliffe, but the house, mill and modern homes are.

== Geology ==
The cliff is protected as Guy's Cliffe Site of Special Scientific Interest (SSSI) owing to its geological interest. Its citation states that this is due to it being a good exposure of Middle Triassic sandstone, which is of particular interest for fossils of Mastodonsaurus.

== Points of interest ==
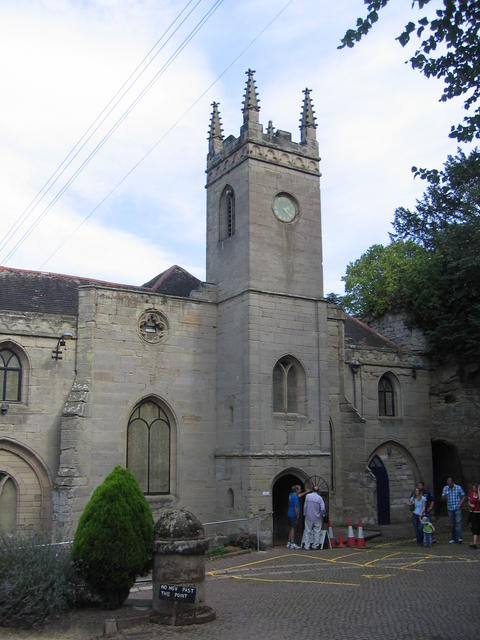
St Mary's Chapel, Guy's Cliffe in 2006

- The chapel, used for Masonic ceremonies, has a large statue depicting Guy of Warwick.
- Piers Gaveston, the favourite of Edward II, sought refuge and was (allegedly) apprehended here before his execution on nearby Blacklow Hill at Leek Wootton.
- Saxon Mill on the River Avon, a former water-powered mill, now a pub and restaurant.

== See also ==
- Old Milverton
