= Portobello Bridge =

Bridge in Warwick District, England

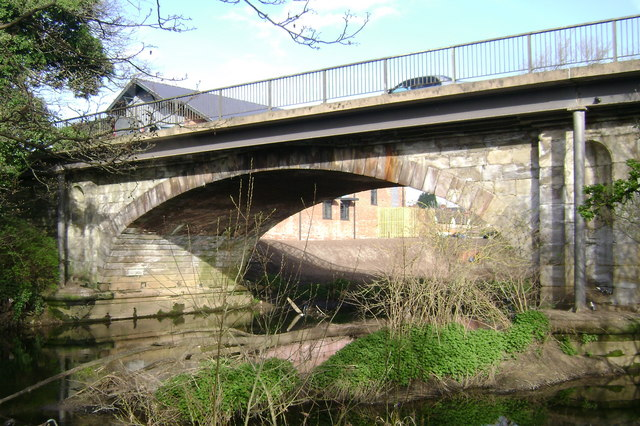
- A view of the south side of the bridge.
- Coordinates: 52.289216°N 1.560064°W
- Locale: Warwick, Warwick District, Warwickshire, England
- Heritage status: Grade II listed
- Historic England list entry number: 1271475

Characteristics
- No. of spans: 3
- No. of lanes: 2

History
- Designer: John Nichol
- Constructed by: Thomas Townshend
- Opened: 1831

Portobello Bridge is a grade II listed road bridge across the River Avon between the towns of Warwick and Leamington Spa, in Warwickshire, England. It carries the A445 Emscote Road, historically the main route between Warwick and Rugby.

== History ==
The bridge was originally built in 1831. The building contractor was Thomas Townshend, and the design has been attributed to John Nichol, County Surveyor. Its construction was paid for by local landowner Bertie Greatheed and the Earl of Warwick to replace an older bridge nearby which had failed. The earlier structure, Emscote Bridge, was in existence by 1625 but became so unsafe that it was demolished in 1830 and replaced by the present bridge 20 yards (18 m) downstream. It cost £9,000.

The bridge, which was restored in 1892, formed part of the route for the Leamington & Warwick Tramways & Omnibus Company from 1881 until its closure in 1930. Close to the bridge, in 1857, water began to be drawn for the river to supply Warwick, and a pumping station was built shortly afterwards.

== Description ==
Portobello Bridge is a masonry bridge with 3 spans in the form of wide elliptical arches, made of brick with ashlar facing. Each arch has rusticated detail in its voussoir, and large niches are set into each pier. There are pedestrian walkways on both sides: that on the north side dates from the late 19th century and is of wrought iron with a latticework parapet, while the southern walkway was added in the mid-20th century and has steel railings. The arches are supported by moulded plinths.

Warwick District Council describes the bridge and the adjacent undeveloped riverbanks as "form[ing] part of the critical green gap" between Warwick and Leamington Spa.

== See also ==
- List of crossings of the River Avon, Warwickshire
- Media related to Portobello Bridge, Warwickshire at Wikimedia Commons
