= Stratford-upon-Avon chain ferry =

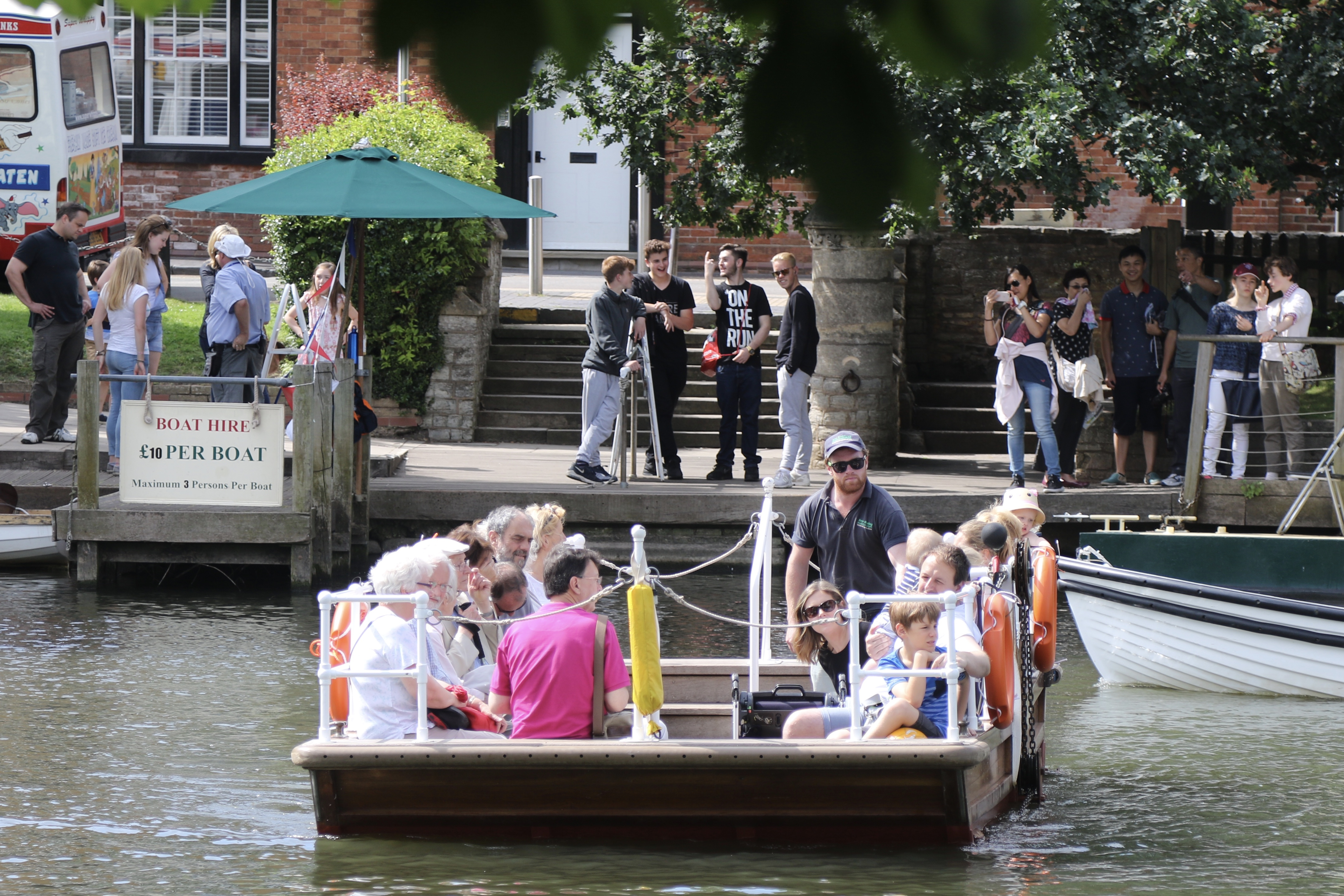
- The ferry crossing the River Avon in Stratford-upon-Avon
- Coordinates: 52.1909°N 1.7051°W
- Carries: Pedestrians
- Crosses: River Avon
- Locale: Stratford-upon-Avon, Warwickshire, England
- Named for: The boat is named Malvolio, a character in Twelfth Night
- Owner: Stratford-on-Avon District Council
- Maintained by: Avon Boating Ltd
- Heritage status: Last chain ferry built in Britain
- Next upstream: Tramway Bridge

Characteristics
- Design: Chain ferry
- Material: Steel ferryboat and submerged chain

History
- Opened: 1937

Statistics
- Daily traffic: Seasonal (March–October)
- Toll: £1 (adults, each-way)

Location
- Interactive map of Stratford-upon-Avon chain ferry

The Stratford-upon-Avon chain ferry is a manually operated pedestrian chain ferry across the River Avon in the town of Stratford-upon-Avon in the English county of Warwickshire.

== Overview ==
The ferry is owned by Stratford-upon-Avon District Council. It links Waterside, roughly halfway between the Royal Shakespeare Theatre and Holy Trinity Church, with the water meadows on the opposite side of the river. The vessel used on the service is named Malvolio, after the character of the same name in William Shakespeare's comedy Twelfth Night.

== History ==
The chain ferry opened in 1937, and it was the last of its kind to be built in Britain. By 2006, the ferry was carrying 100,000 people a year, and it was proposed that it be moved to make way for a new bridge. However, in 2010, the ferry vessel resumed service at its original location after an overhaul and restoration work, undertaken by the local boating firm, Avon Boating Ltd.

The chain ferry is currently run by Avon Boating Ltd under licence from the district council, and is in operation daily from mid March to the end of October.

== Fees ==
It currently costs £1 for an adult to cross one way.

== See also ==
- List of crossings of the River Avon, Warwickshire
