= Warwick Greyhound Stadium =

Sports venue in the UK

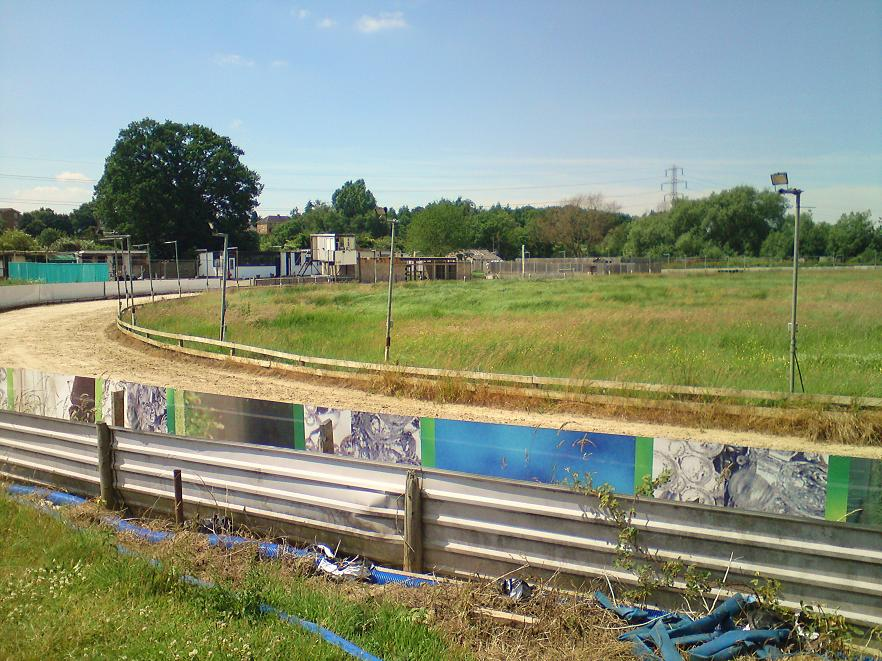
- Location: Emscote Road, Warwick, Warwickshire
- Coordinates: 52°17′44″N 1°33′43″W
- Opened: 1927
- Closed: 2007

Warwick Greyhound Stadium was a greyhound racing stadium on Emscote Road in Warwick, Warwickshire.

== Origins ==
The track was constructed on a floodplain on the west bank of the River Avon on the south-east side of Millbank Park. It was north of Emscote Road and could be accessed from Portobello Way. There were large drains on the south side of the stadium near Rock Mill Weir to help combat flooding.

== History ==
The greyhound racing was independent (not affiliated to the sports governing body the National Greyhound Racing Club) and was known as a flapping track which was the nickname given to independent tracks. Built in 1927 Warwick is believed to be one of the first flapping tracks to be constructed but did not trade continuously until 2007.

The track had a 360-metre circumference with sharp second and third bends with race distances of 90, 275, 450, 610 and 810 metres. Principal events were the Warwick St Leger and Warwick and an 'Outside Sumner' hare system was used. There was a public house located on the other side of the Emscote Road called The Greyhound. This closed shortly after the track and is now an Indian restaurant.

== Closure ==
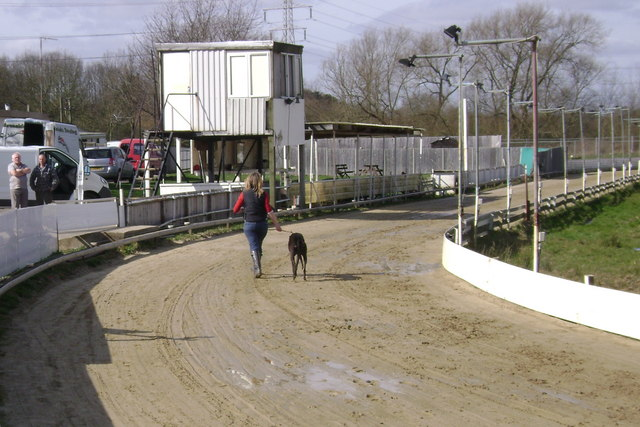
the track in 2009

The racing ended in 2007 but is believed to have resumed for a short time at a later date before closing permanently. The track remains In situ but new housing on Portobello Way has crept closer to the track from the south and the track is very overgrown.
