= Leamington and Warwick Tramways and Omnibus Company =

Tramway operator in England

Warwick and Leamington Spa Tramway
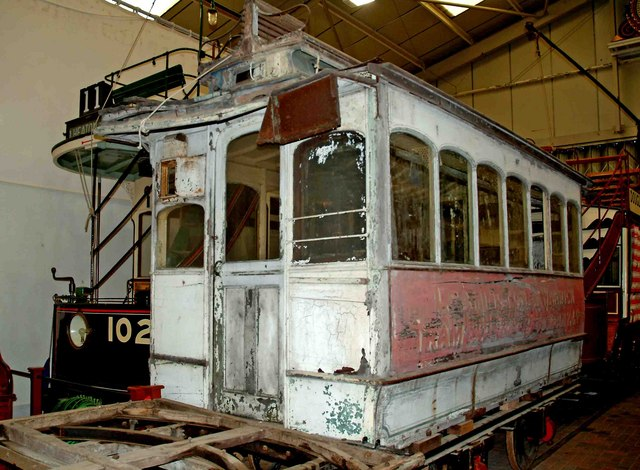
- Unrestored Leamington and Warwick tram at the National Tramway Museum

Operation
- Locale: Warwick, Leamington Spa
- Open: 21 November 1881
- Close: 16 August 1930
- Status: Closed

Statistics
- Route length: 3.04 miles (4.89 km)
Leamington & Warwick Tramways & Omnibus Company era: 1881–1905
- Track gauge: 4 ft 8 1/2 in (1,435 mm)
- Propulsion system: Horse
Leamington and Warwick Electrical Company Limited era: 1905–1930
- Track gauge: 3 ft 6 in (1,067 mm)
- Propulsion system: Electric

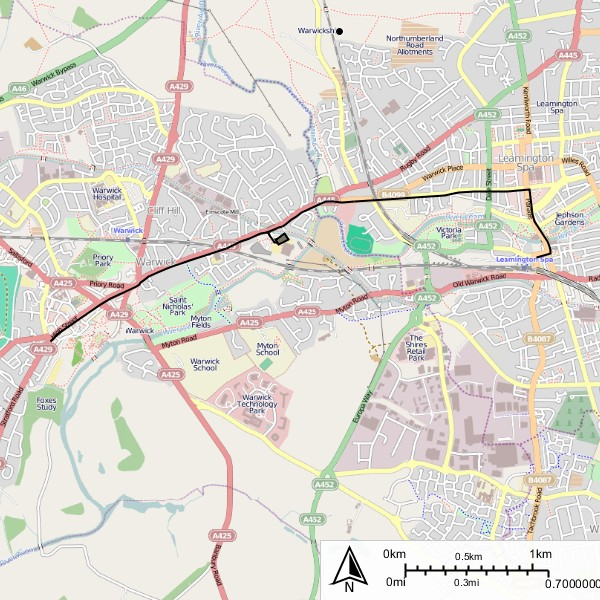
Map of the route of the Leamington and Warwick Tramway

The Leamington and Warwick Tramways and Omnibus Company operated a tramway service between Warwick and Leamington Spa between 1881 and 1930.

== Horse operation ==
From 1872 various tramway projects were considered until the Leamington and Warwick Tramways Order 1879 was granted. The Leamington and Warwick Tramways and Omnibus Company Ltd was registered on 18 February 1880. On 14 May 1881 they signed a contract with John Fell of Leamington for the construction of the line. On 17 November 1880, the work was completed. The cost of construction had been £14,800 (equivalent to £1,560,000 in 2025).

The line ran from outside the Lord Leycester Hospital, through Jury Street, Smith Street, and Emscote Road, across Portobello Bridge over the River Avon, and into Leamington, along Warwick Street, down The Parade and through to Leamington Spa railway station.

It opened for passengers on 21 November 1881. It was a single track standard gauge line, with two tracks on Smith Street in Warwick, and additional passing loops and a line into stables at Coten End. There were seven trams operating a 13-minute headway service. Four were Metropolitan cars, two were Brown Marshall and one was ex-Birmingham Tramways Company.

== Electric operation ==
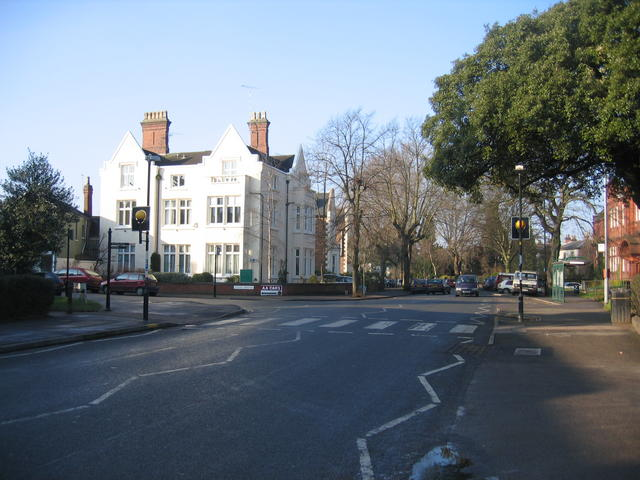
Site of Avenue Road Tram terminus, Leamington Spa

The company was obtained by Brush Electric Traction in 1900 and the Warwick Tramways Order 1900 and Leamington Tramways Order 1901 allowed for electrification. The company re-built the tramway in 1905 and replaced the horse cars with electric powered vehicles. The company took the opportunity to double track most of the line, at the same time converting the track gauge to 3 ft 6 in (1,067 mm). The power station was built specially for the tramway conversion. The electric service started on 12 July 1905. In 1912 the tramway and lighting company was purchased by Balfour Beatty and Company.

The system was closed on 16 August 1930.

=== Fleet ===
The company livery was green and cream.

- 1-6 Brush cars 1905
- 7-12 Brush cars 1905 (purchased from the Taunton Tramways)
- 14 Balfour Beatty and Company 1921

No 7 was damaged beyond repair in an accident on 3 January 1916 when it ran away and crashed into the Warwick Arms.

On closure in 1930, No 11 was sold to the Llandudno and Colwyn Bay Electric Railway.

The remains of No. 11 were last seen in 1956 by John Price on the closure of the L&CBET.

== Surviving trams ==
After electrification, horse car 1 was sold and converted into a bungalow at nearby Claverdon. It was rescued by the Birmingham Railway Museum in 1984 and is now at the National Tramway Museum in Crich, Derbyshire. The car is displayed in the museum's main exhibition hall in unrestored state as a way of illustrating the state that many of the museum's tramcars were in at the time they were taken into preservation.

== Bibliography ==
- Jennings, Allan; Coulls, Peter (2019). The Leamington and Warwick Tramway. Sydni Books. ISBN 978-1-9161364-0-3.
- "The Leamington and Warwick Tramway". Tramway Review. Vol. 4, no. 31. 1961.
