= Tramway Bridge =

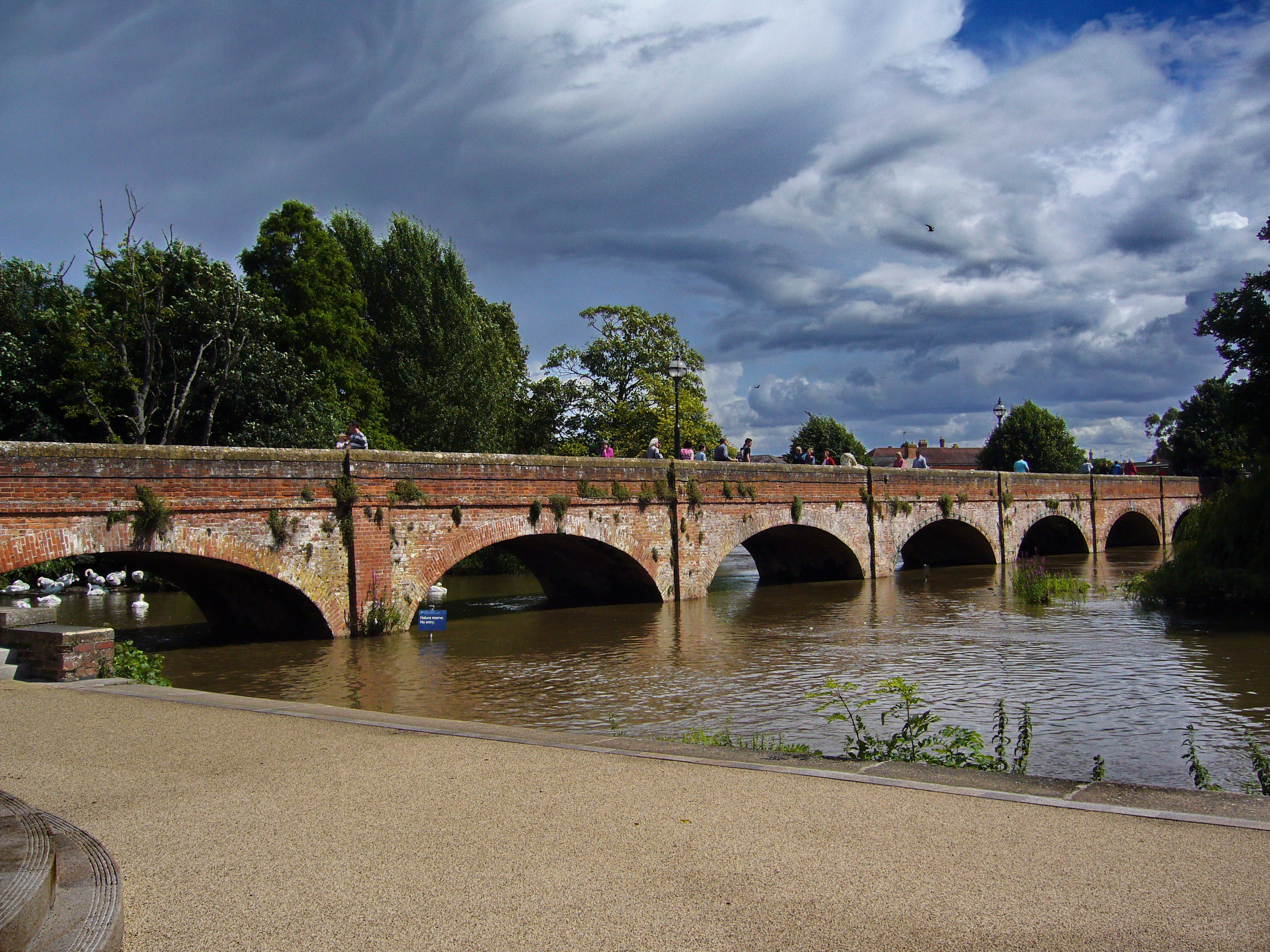
- The bridge crossing the River Avon in Stratford-upon-Avon
- Coordinates: 52.191075°N 1.701431°W
- Carries: Pedestrians from 1918 (originally horse-drawn tramway)
- Crosses: River Avon
- Locale: Stratford-upon-Avon, Warwickshire, England
- Next upstream: Clopton Bridge
- Next downstream: Stratford-upon-Avon chain ferry

Characteristics
- Design: Arch bridge
- Material: Brick with ashlar-coped parapets
- No. of spans: 8

History
- Designer: John Urpeth Rastrick
- Opened: 1823

Statistics

Listed Building – Grade II
- Official name: Old Tramway Bridge
- Designated: 25 October 1951
- Reference no.: 1187828

Listed Building – Grade II
- Official name: Tramway House
- Designated: 4 April 1994
- Reference no.: 1187829

Location
- Interactive map of Tramway Bridge

The Tramway Bridge is a grade II listed pedestrian bridge crossing the River Avon at Stratford-upon-Avon, Warwickshire, England.

The bridge was built in 1823, originally to carry a tramway track of the horse-drawn Stratford and Moreton Tramway. It was designed by John Urpeth Rastrick. It consists of eight elliptical arches, and is made from brick, with ashlar-coped parapets.

The tramway had fallen into disuse by 1904, and the track was lifted in 1918. It has since then been used a public footbridge, and is an important element in the landscape around the Royal Shakespeare Theatre. The bridge gained grade II listing in 1951. In 2010 the local council fitted strip lights down on the footway to simulate the historic tracks, however these were abandoned in 2020 after they repeatedly broke down.

The bridge is around 100 metres (330 ft) to the west of, and downstream from the much older Clopton Bridge which dates from the 15th century.

Two further relics of the old tramway are located immediately to the north of the bridge: An old toll house known as Tramway House at the northern end of the bridge which is also grade II listed. And a restored wagon of the tramway, which is located and displayed about 60 metres (200 ft) to the north of the bridge, with an information board about the history of the tramway.

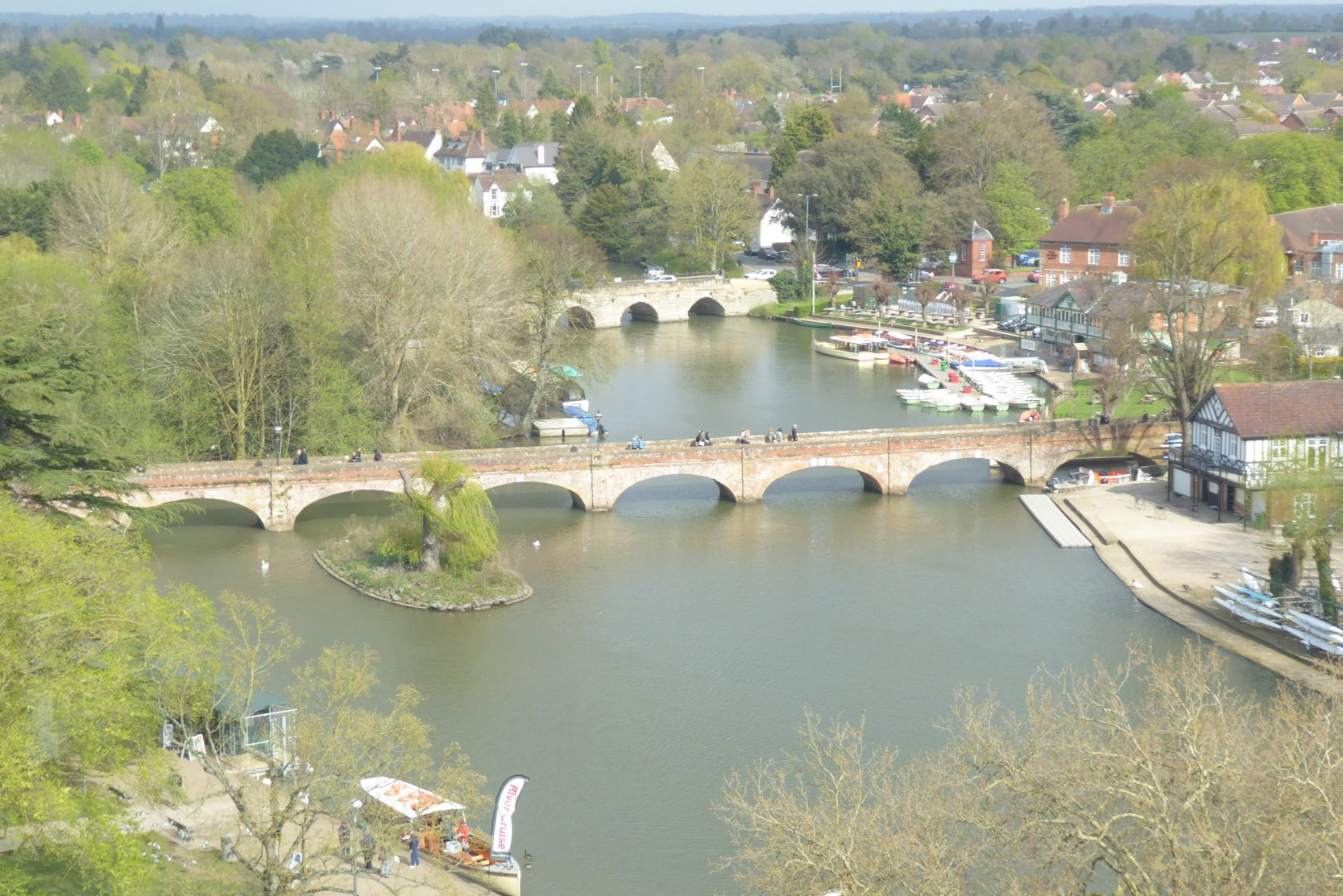
Tramway Bridge, with Clopton Bridge in the background

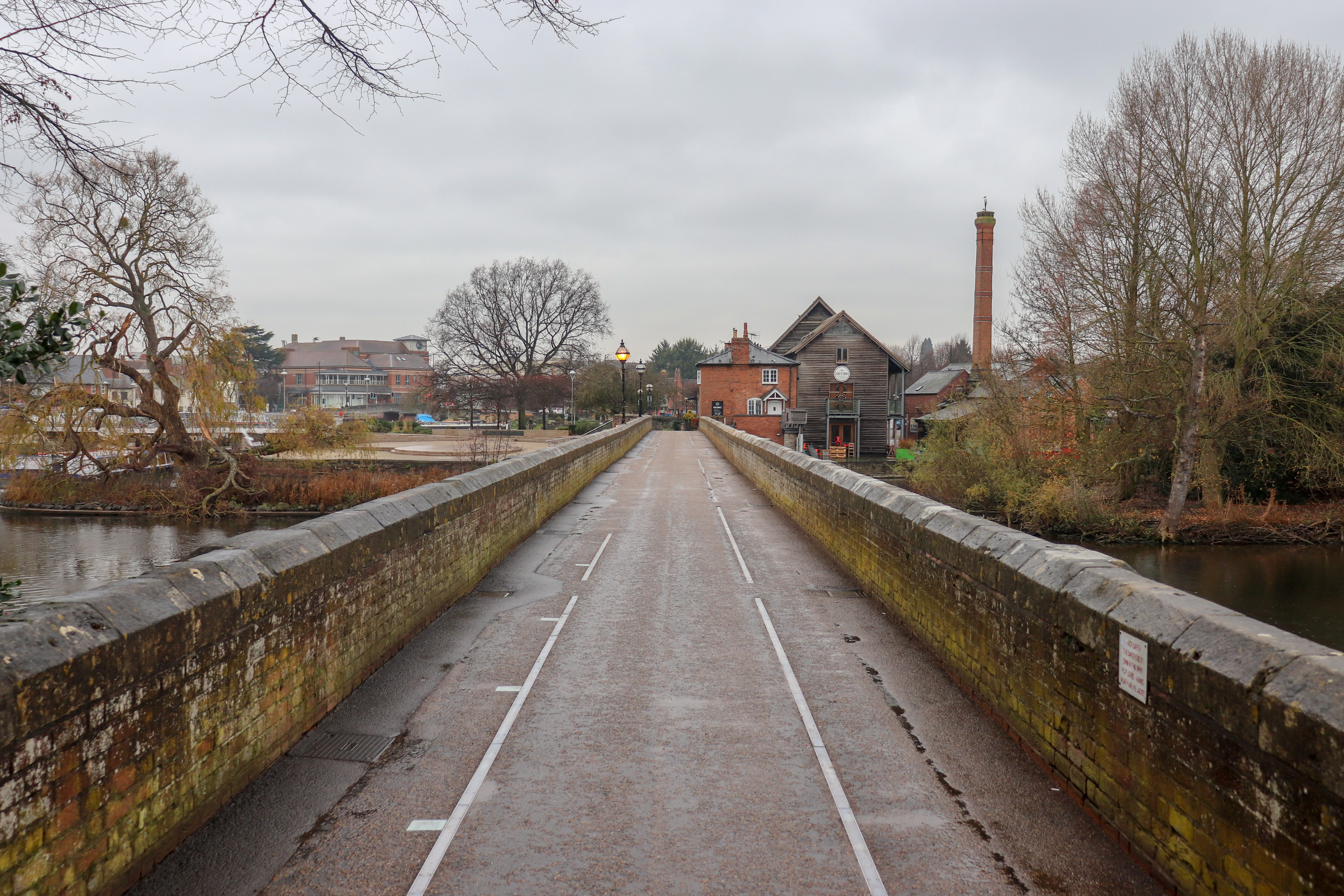
View from the bridge deck, looking west

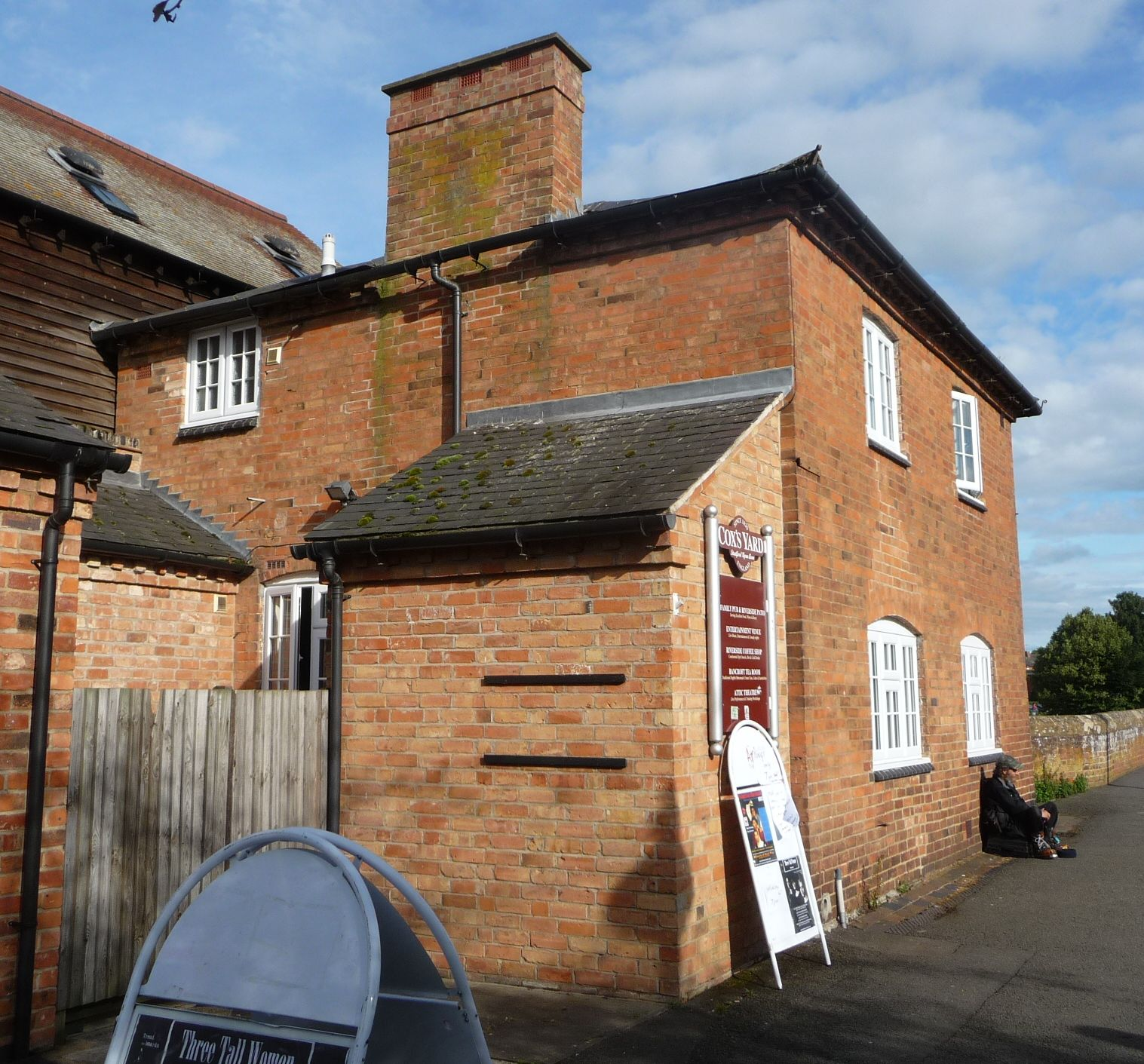
Tramway House, former toll house adjacent to the bridge.

== See also ==
- List of crossings of the River Avon, Warwickshire
