= Old Milverton =

Village in Warwickshire, England

Coordinates: 52°18′15″N 1°33′57″W

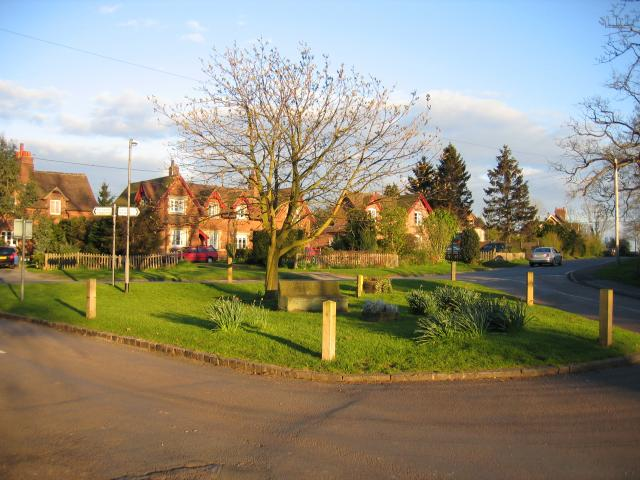
The village green

Old Milverton is a village east of Warwick and north west of Leamington Spa in Warwickshire, England, and situated in a bend of the River Avon. The population as taken at the 2011 census was 319.

== Village ==
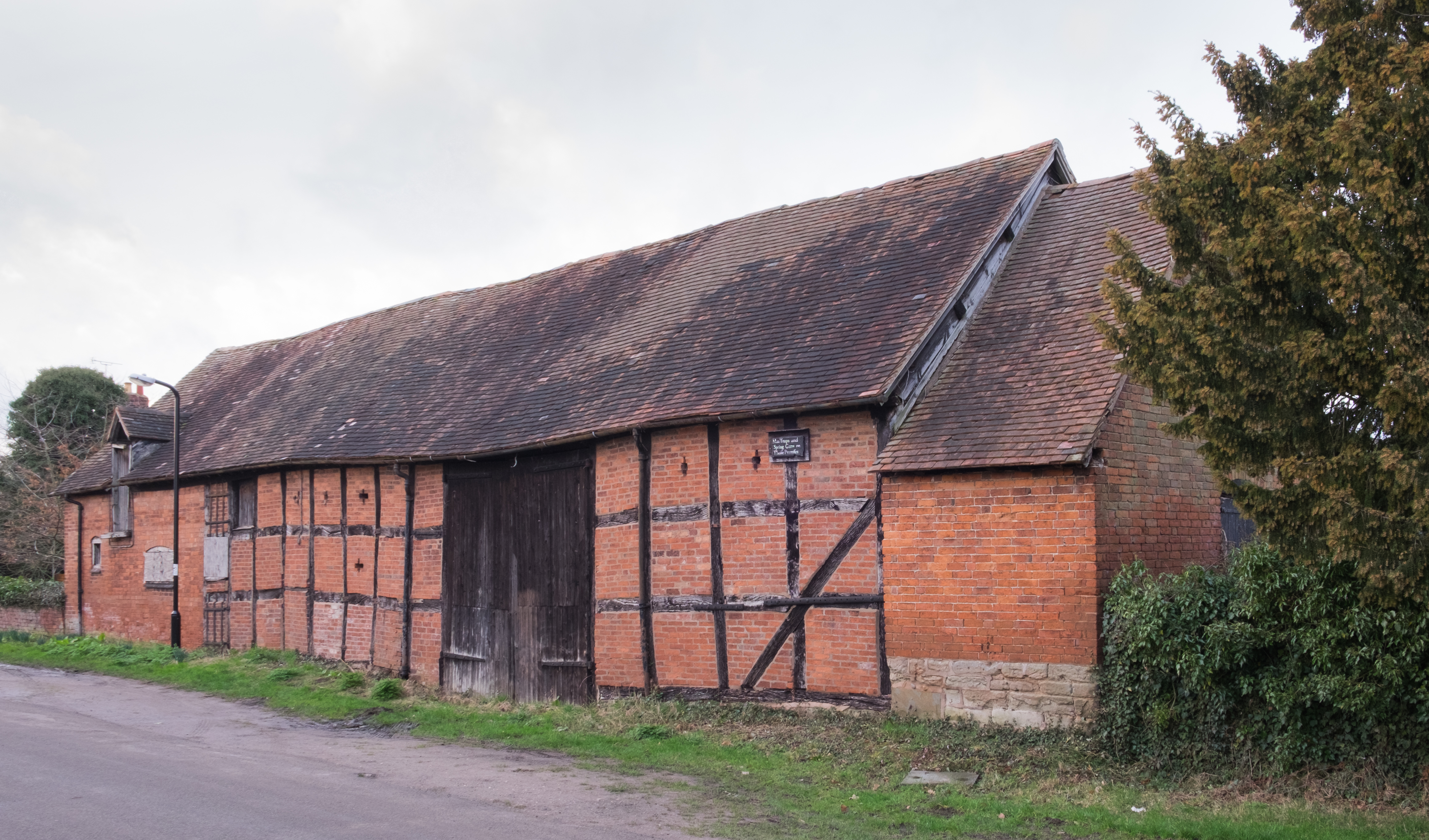
17th-century barn

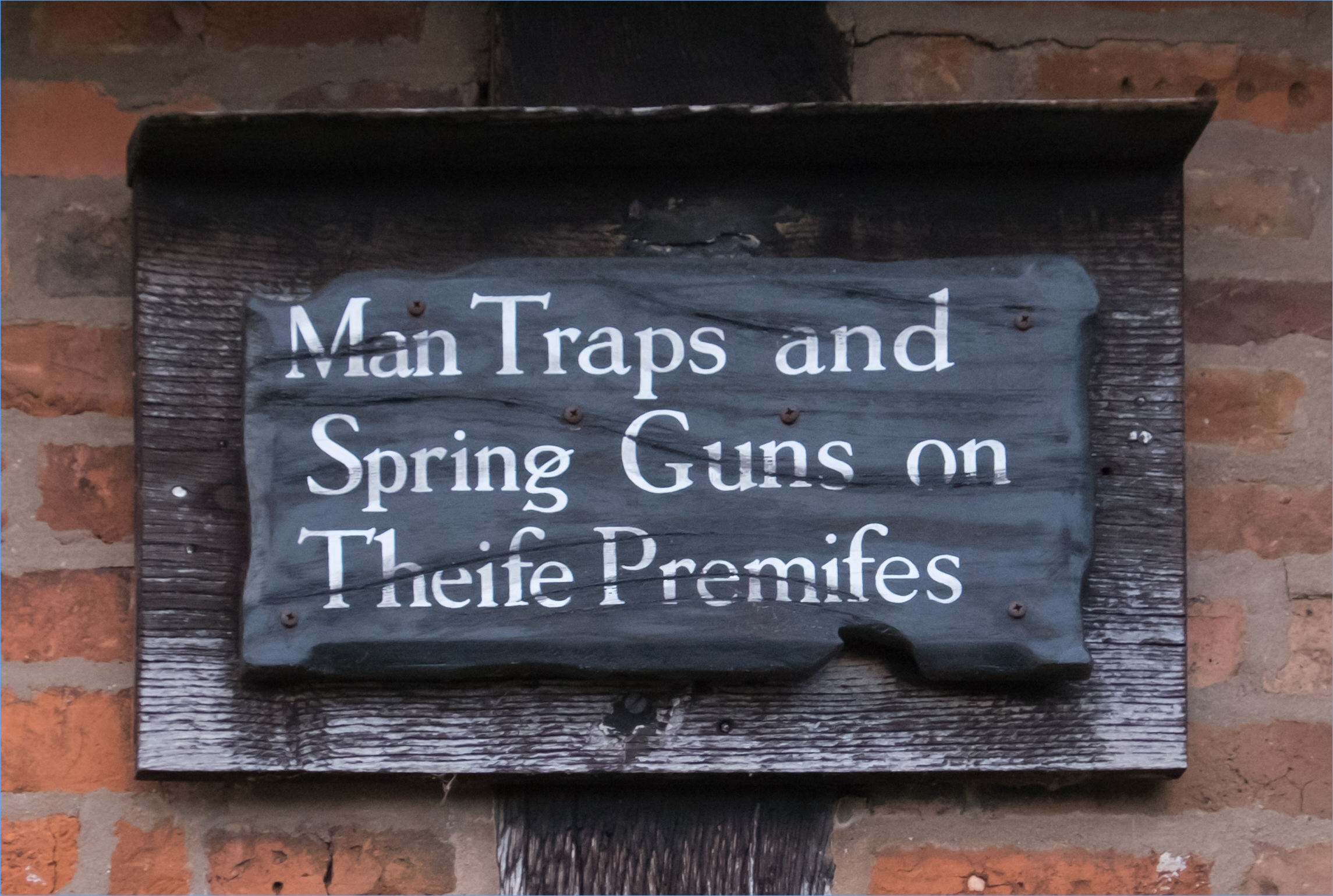
A warning fixed to a barn wall

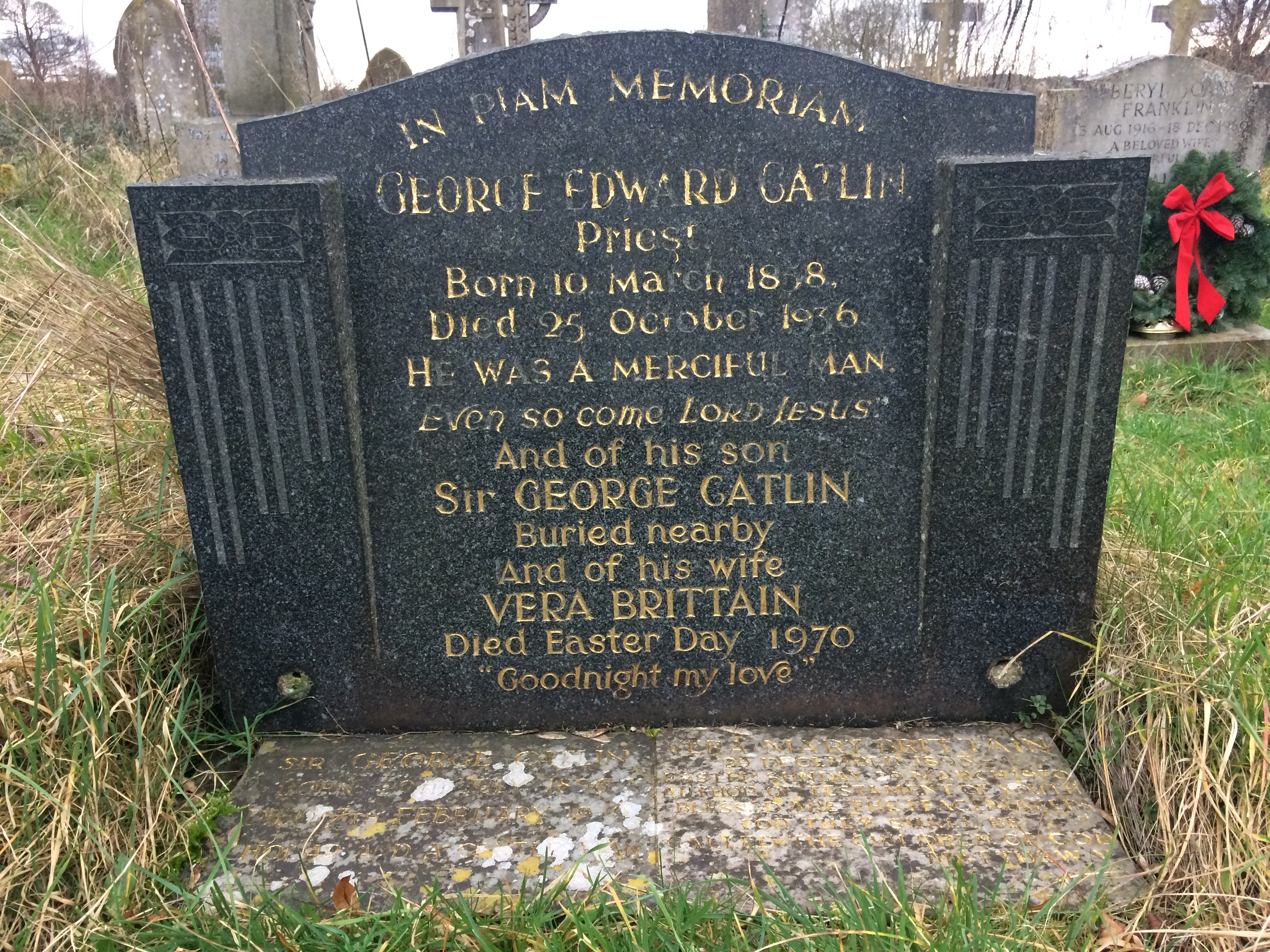
Memorial to Sir George Catlin and his wife Vera Brittain

It lies at an altitude of 60–65 metres above sea level. The Church of England parish church of St James was built in 1879–80, on the site of an older church, from designs by John Gibson. It was funded by Lord Charles Percy and Lady Ann Bertie Percy (son and daughter-in-law of Algernon Percy). The church includes a stained-glass window honouring Henry Jephson, who promoted the therapeutic benefits of Leamington Spa water and was instrumental in that town's success. In the churchyard is buried the political scientist Sir George Catlin (1896–1979). Catlin, whose father served as an Anglican priest in Leamington from 1904 to 1912, was the husband of Vera Brittain (1893–1970), pacifist, feminist and author of Testament of Youth. Brittain's ashes were divided between the grave of her husband and the grave of her brother Edward Brittain who died on active service in Italy.

Access to the village can be difficult in extreme weather as there are only two roads leading to it. There are very few amenities in Old Milverton. However, in the village hall a pre-school playgroup takes place on a regular basis and there is a bus which runs to the nearby towns of Warwick and Leamington Spa and back once a day. The annual flower show and village fête took place for the 116th time in September 2013 featuring attractions such as vegetable growing, flower arranging and a barn dance.

== Nearby ==
Situated close by are the historic ruins of Guy's Cliffe house and the Saxon Mill – a water mill mentioned in the Domesday Book which is now a pub and restaurant. Just outside the village is Quarry Park Disc Golf Club which is one of only 17 courses in the United Kingdom, and was the venue for the 2008 and 2009 UK Championships. The electoral ward of Milverton in Leamington Spa lies to the south.
