= Hampton Lucy Bridge =

Cast iron bridge in Warwickshire, England

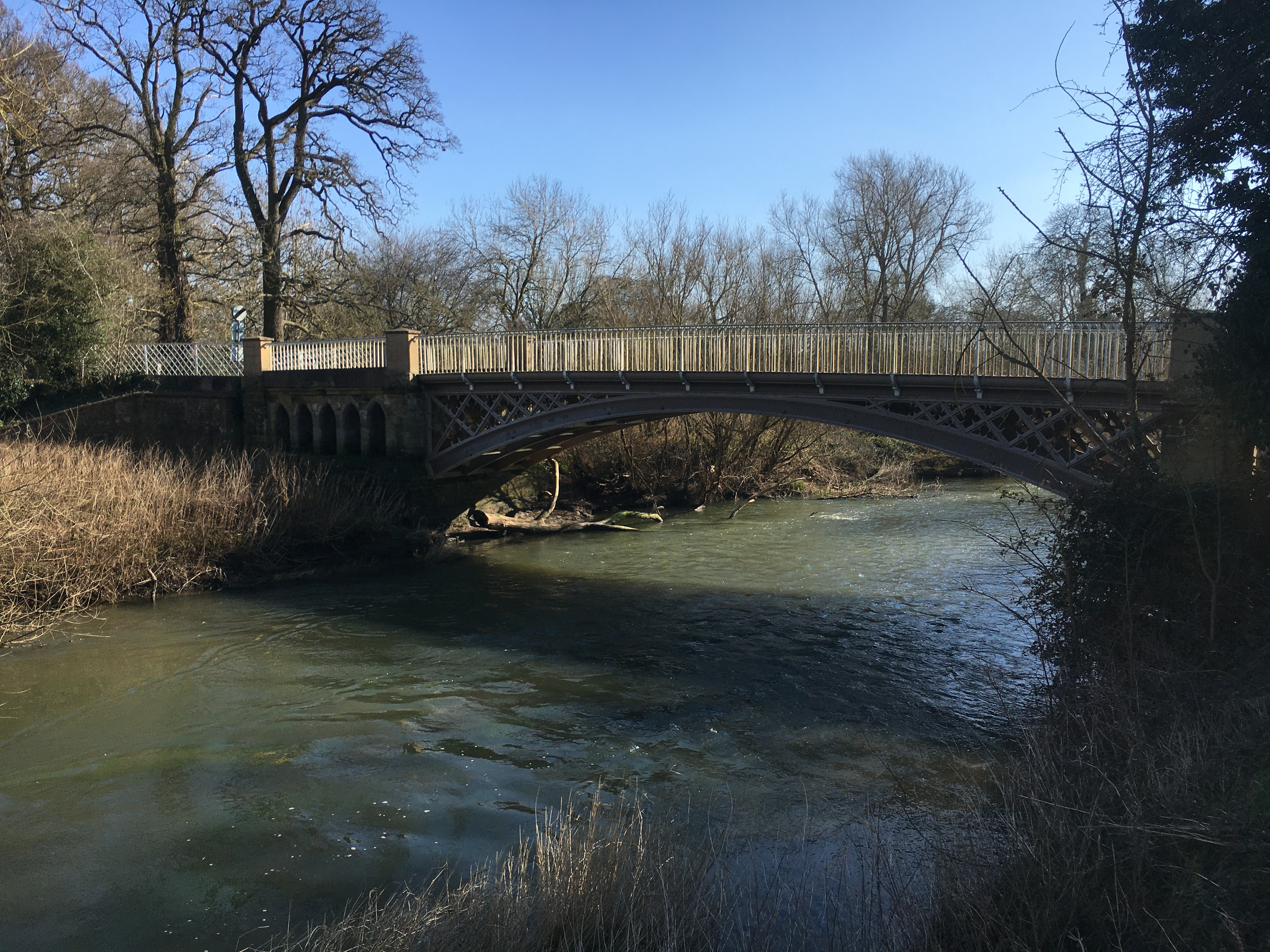
- A view of Hampton Lucy Bridge in February 2021
- Coordinates: 52.2121°N 1.62442°W
- OS grid reference: SP 25755 57159
- Owner: Warwickshire County Council
- Heritage status: Grade II listed
- Historic England list entry number: 1382105

Characteristics
- Material: Cast-iron
- Pier construction: Ashlared stone
- Total length: 20m
- Load limit: 7.5t maximum
- No. of lanes: 1

History
- Engineering design by: Horseley Ironworks
- Constructed by: Thomas Townshend
- Construction end: 1829

Location
- Interactive map of Hampton Lucy Bridge

Hampton Lucy Bridge is a cast-iron bridge over the River Avon at the east end of the village of Hampton Lucy in Warwickshire, England. It was originally constructed in 1829, and was Grade II listed on 6 February 1952.

== History ==
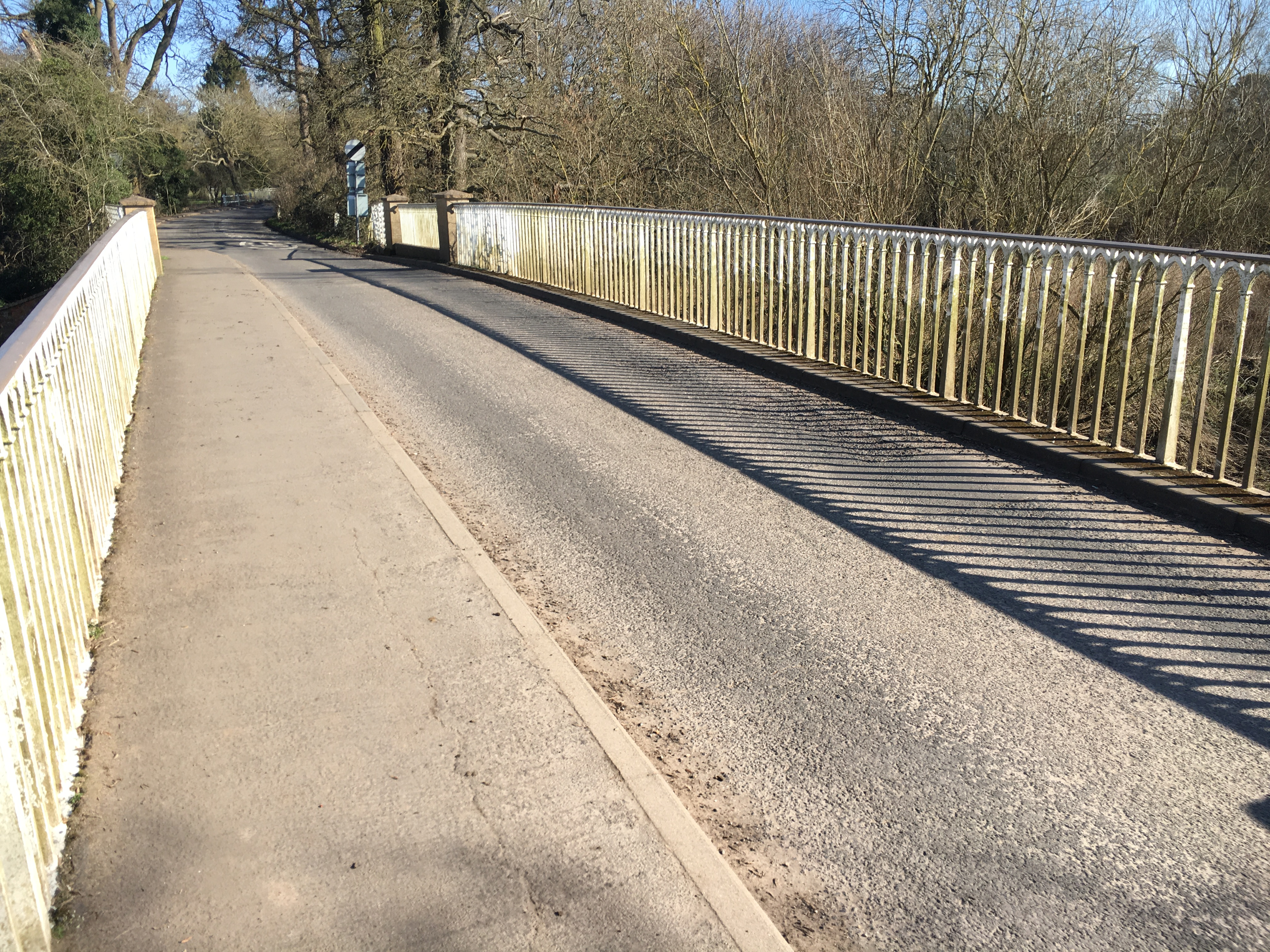
A view of the bridge deck

In 1829 the Rvd John Lucy, a member of the affluent Lucy family, paid for the design and construction of the bridge at the east end of Bridge Street. It was designed and cast by Horseley Ironworks and installed by Thomas Townshend, who worked on a number of projects to improve the nearby Birmingham Canal. The bridge consists of four identical cast-iron ribs set on ashlared stone piers containing five flood-relief passages apiece in the form of pointed arches. It has cast-iron handrails flanking a single lane deck with a raised footpath on the northern side.

The second rib from the south side bears the inscription "This bridge was built at the expense of the Revd. John Lucy Rector of this Parish A.D. 1829".

An inspector in 1921 reported that the bridge was "in excellent condition", but the piers were reinforced with concrete at some point in the 20th century. The bridge was closed from Thursday 10 January 1991 so that steel tie bars could be installed between the ribs to strengthen the bridge, but it retained its 7.5t weight limit once the work was completed.

== See also ==
- The Iron Bridge – another early cast-iron bridge
- St Peter ad Vincula Church, Hampton Lucy – the parish church, also paid for by the Lucy family at a similar time
- Charlecote Park – ancestral home of the Lucy family
