= Leek Wootton and Guy's Cliffe =

Civil parish in Warwickshire, United Kingdom

Coordinates: 52.313°N 1.589°W

Leek Wootton & Guy's Cliffe is a civil parish in the Warwick District of Warwickshire, England. It was created when the smallest parish in England, Guy's Cliffe, was merged with Leek Wootton on 1 April 1986, and includes the hamlets of Hill Wootton, Chesford, Goodrest and North and Middle Woodloes, located between the towns of Kenilworth and Warwick. It is part of the constituency of Kenilworth and Southam. The parish covers 1,391 hectares and has a population of approximately 1,100., being measured as 1,017 at the 2011 census.

Warwick District Council "made" (adopted) Leek Wootton & Guy's Cliffe Parish Council's Neighbourhood Development Plan on 4 May 2018, following the plan being endorsed by more than the required threshold in a referendum held on 3 May 2018.
