= Saxon Mill =

Restaurant in Warwickshire, England

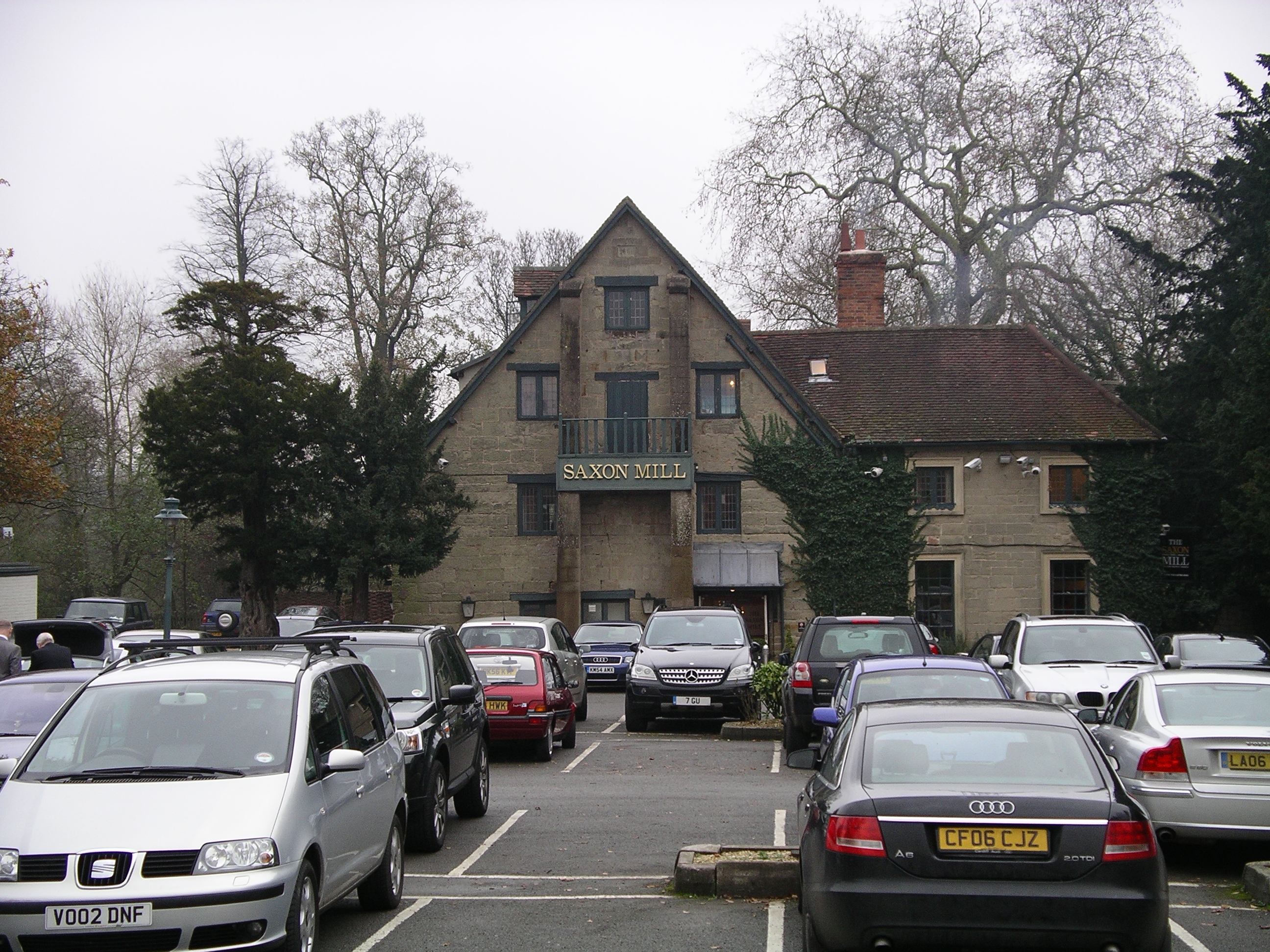
- View across the car park from Coventry Road (A429), November 2007
- Interactive map of Saxon Mill
- Location: Guy's Cliffe, Warwickshire, England
- Coordinates: 52.3009°N 1.5744°W
- OS grid reference: SP 29127 67065
- Built: 12th century
- Original use: Water-mill, miller's house, and warehouse.
- Restored: 1822 (rebuilt); 1952 (restaurant conversion)
- Current use: Restaurant and bar
- Website: www.saxonmill.co.uk

Listed Building – Grade II
- Official name: The Saxon Mill (Part of the Saxon Mill Restaurant)
- Designated: 20 August 1951
- Reference no.: 1035176

Listed Building – Grade II
- Official name: The Saxon Mill Restaurant
- Designated: 11 April 1967
- Reference no.: 1035177

Listed Building – Grade II
- Official name: Punishment Stocks 3 Yards to South of the Saxon Mill
- Designated: 23 January 1987
- Reference no.: 1364952

The Saxon Mill is a former watermill, miller's house, and warehouse at Guy's Cliffe, in Warwickshire, England. It is situiated on the Coventry Road (A429) about one mile northeast of the town of Warwick. It is now a restaurant and bar. It is on the River Avon and it has a water wheel, although a larger waterwheel has gone. At the rear of the mill, there is a pedestrian footbridge and weir crossing the River Avon towards Old Milverton. The building has been designated as a Grade II listed building on the National Heritage List for England since 20 August 1951.

== History ==
The mill was originally called Gibbeclive Mill in the 12th century. It was the property of St Mary's Abbey, Kenilworth and the Augustinian canons until the Dissolution of the Monasteries. It was rebuilt in 1822. It was a working mill until 1938, and it was converted into a restaurant and bar in 1952. As of 2008, the restaurant has a glass window cut-away in the floor where the water can be seen flowing under the building.

== Gallery ==
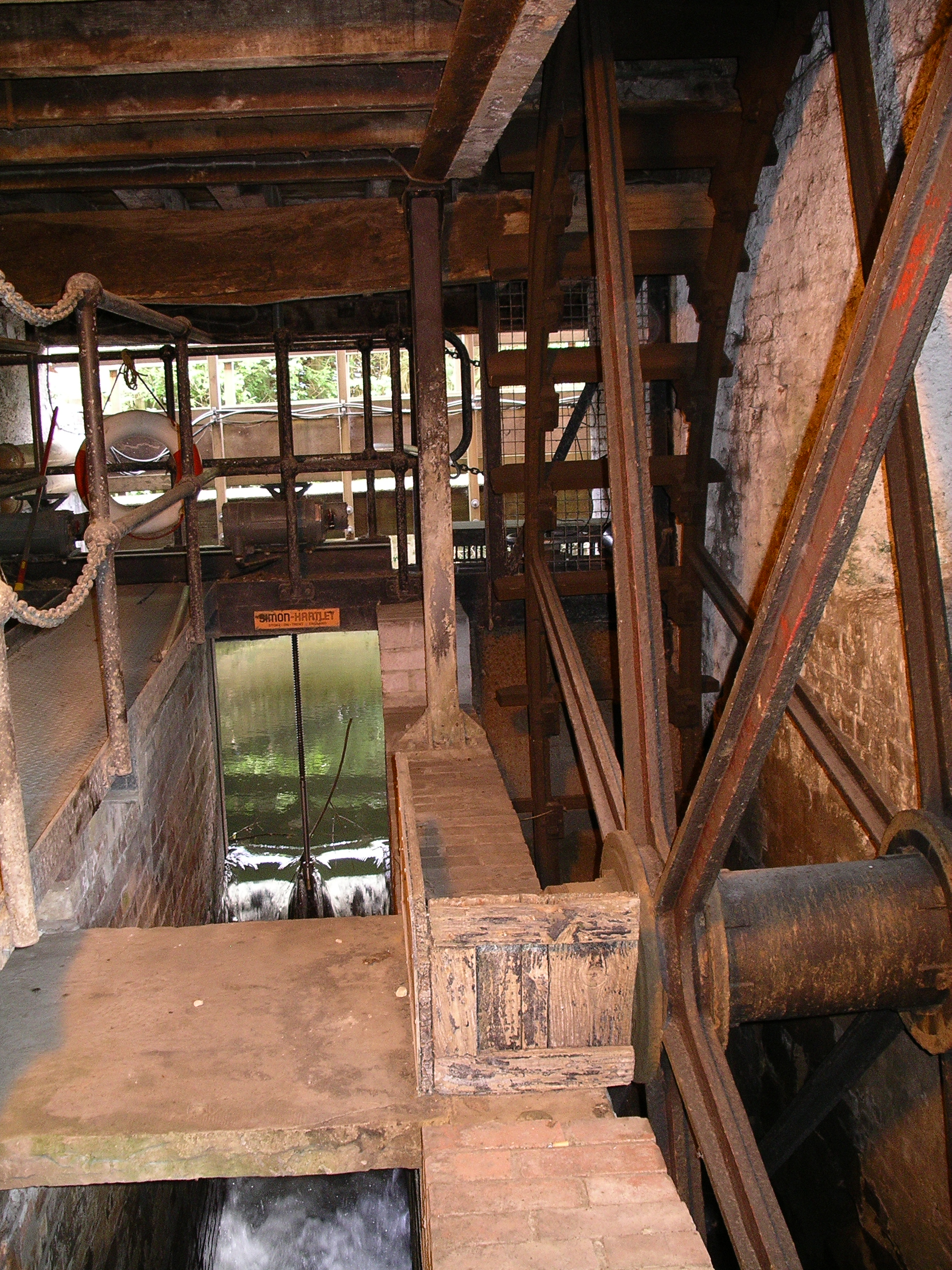
The water wheel

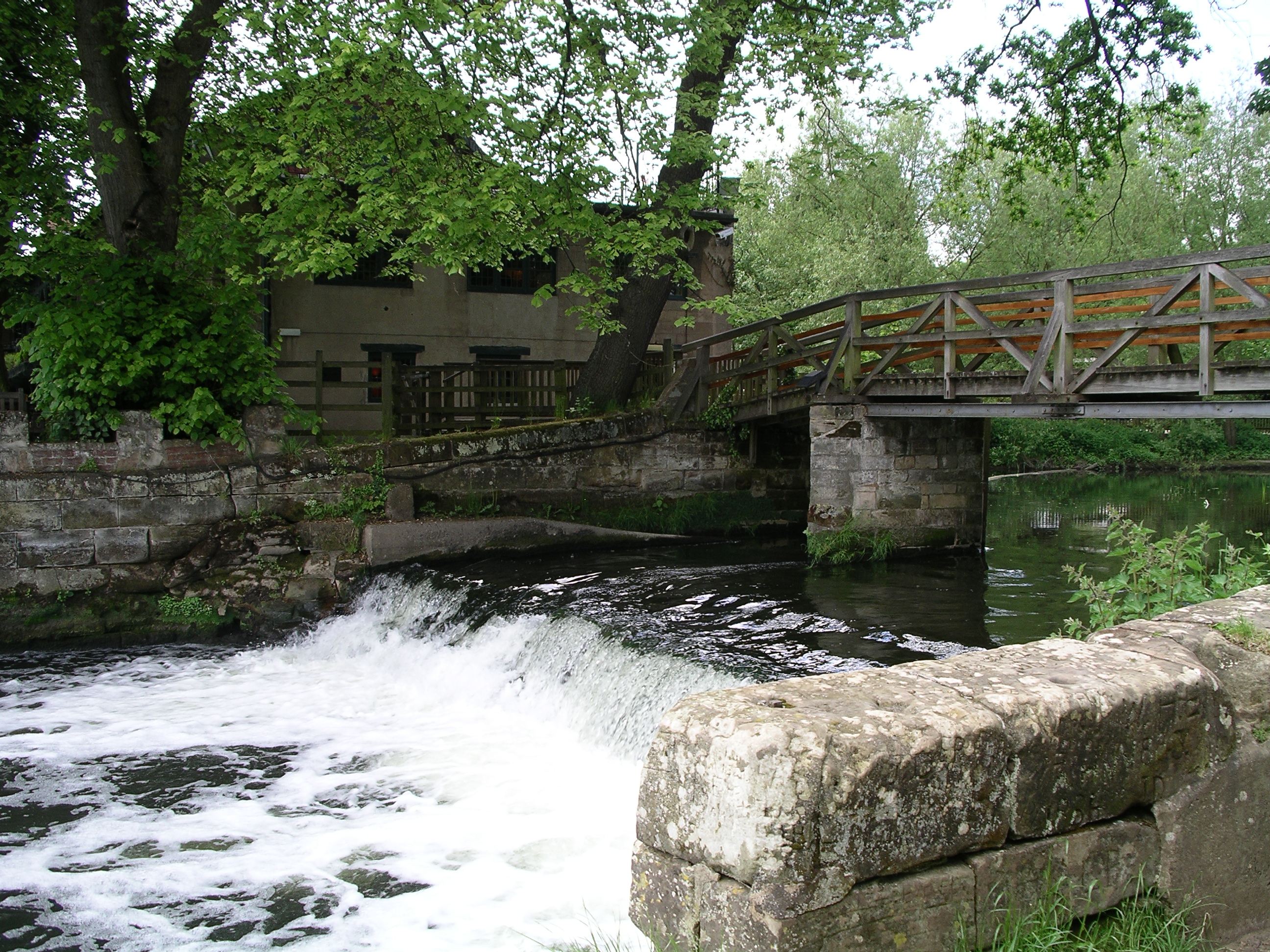
River Avon weir and footbridge
